= Diocese of Monmouth =

Diocese of the Church in Wales

Coordinates: 51°40′N 3°00′W

Diocese of Monmouth Esgobaeth Mynwy

Location
- Ecclesiastical province: Wales
- Archdeaconries: Monmouth, Newport, Gwent Valleys

Statistics
- Parishes: 125
- Churches: 184

Information
- Cathedral: Newport Cathedral

Current leadership
- Bishop: Cherry Vann

Map
- Map of the diocese in the Church in Wales

Website
- monmouth.churchinwales.org.uk

The Diocese of Monmouth is a diocese of the Church in Wales. Despite the name, its cathedral is located not in Monmouth but in Newport — Newport Cathedral (Welsh: Cadeirlan Casnewydd), commonly known as St Woolos Cathedral. Reasons for not choosing the title of Newport included the existence of a Catholic Bishop of Newport until 1916. This apparent anomaly arose in 1921 when the diocese was created (from the eastern part of the Diocese of Llandaff) with no location for the cathedral yet chosen. Various options were being considered, such as restoring Tintern Abbey, building from scratch on Ridgeway Hill in Newport, and (the eventual choice) upgrading St Woolos, then a parish church; in the meantime the new diocese, as it covers more or less the territory of the county of Monmouth, was named the "Diocese of Monmouth". Prior to 1921 the area had been the archdeaconry of Monmouth.

It is headed by Cherry Vann, Bishop of Monmouth. She was elected the eleventh bishop in September 2019 and enthroned in Newport Cathedral on 1 February 2020.

In its own words, the diocese "covers the south east corner of Wales, from Monmouth south to Chepstow, westwards along the 'M4 corridor' to Newport and the outskirts of Cardiff, northwards into the south eastern valleys and east into the rural areas around Usk, Raglan, Abergavenny and the Herefordshire border". It covers the entire historic county of Monmouthshire, plus the ancient parish of Llanedeyrn (which was in the historic county of Glamorgan), minus a few areas on the Wales-England border (Dixton, Llangua and Welsh Bicknor).

In local government terms, the territory of the diocese covers the unitary authority areas of:

- Monmouthshire
- Newport
- Torfaen
- Blaenau Gwent (part)
- Caerphilly (part)
- Cardiff (part)
- Herefordshire (part)

== Archdeaconries and deaneries ==
Diocese	Archdeaconry	Deanery	Paid clergy	Churches	Population	People/clergy	People/church	Churches/clergy
Diocese of Monmouth	Archdeaconry of Monmouth	Deanery of Abergavenny	7	24	21,329	3,047	889	3.43
Diocese of Monmouth	Archdeaconry of Monmouth	Deanery of Monmouth	4	19	17,289	4,322	910	4.75
Diocese of Monmouth	Archdeaconry of Monmouth	Deanery of Netherwent	10	31	45,271	4,527	1,460	3.1
Diocese of Monmouth	Archdeaconry of Monmouth	Deanery of Raglan/Usk	4	18	10,512	2,628	584	4.5
Diocese of Monmouth	Archdeaconry of Newport	Deanery of Bassaleg	6	20	101,407	16,901	5,070	3.33
Diocese of Monmouth	Archdeaconry of Newport	Deanery of Newport	11	21	117,654	10,696	5,603	1.91
Diocese of Monmouth	Archdeaconry of the Gwent Valleys	Deanery of Bedwellty	6	18	97,461	16,244	5,415	3
Diocese of Monmouth	Archdeaconry of the Gwent Valleys	Deanery of Pontypool	6	23	138,774	23,129	6,034	3.83
Total/average			54	174	549,697	10,180	3,159	3.22

At the Diocesan Conference, October 2017, the creation of a third archdeaconry — Gwent Valleys — from the two deaneries of Bedwellty and of Pontypool, was approved.

== List of archdeacons ==
=== Archdeacons of Monmouth ===
The archdeaconry of Monmouth was erected, from the Llandaff archdeaconry, in the Diocese of Llandaff on 6 February 1844.

- 26 February 1844 – 1885 (ret.): William Crawley
- 1885–1914 (res.): Conybeare Bruce
- 1914–1921 (res.): Charles Green

From its creation in 1921, the archdeaconry has been in Monmouth diocese.

- 1922–1926 (d.): David Griffiths
- 1926–1930 (res.): David Roberts
- 1930–1940 (res.): Alfred Monahan
- 1940–1954: Samuel Davies
- 1955–1963: Joseph Ralph Jones
- 1963–1973: Ernest Evans
- 1973–1976: Cecil Percival Willis
- 1976–1977 (res.): Clifford Wright
- 1977–1986 (res.): Barrie Evans
- 1986–1993 (res.): Keith Tyte
- 1993–2001: Peter Woodman
- 2001–2008: Glyndwr Hackett
- 2008–2013 (res.): Richard Pain
- 24 November 2013 – 12 March 2021: Ambrose Mason
- 20 June 2021 – present: Ian Rees

Ian Kendall Rees (born 1966) was collated Archdeacon of Monmouth on 20 June 2021. He trained for the ministry at St Michael's College, Llandaff and served his title (curacy) at Barry; he was made deacon at Petertide 2000 (24 June) and ordained priest the following Petertide (30 June 2001) — both times by Barry Morgan, Bishop of Llandaff, at Llandaff Cathedral. He served as an associate priest in Cardiff until 2005, then priest-in-charge near Bridgend, before moving to the Diocese of Swansea and Brecon in 2010. Rees served in several incumbencies there along with diocesan roles and both honorary and residentiary canonries of the cathedral before his move to Monmouth as archdeacon and Director of Ministry and Discipleship.

=== Archdeacons of Newport ===
The archdeaconry of Newport was created from the Monmouth archdeaconry in 1930.

- 1931–1935: the Dean of Monmouth provisionally
- 1935–1948 (ret.): Vaughan Rees
- 1948–1953 (d.): Thomas Parry Pryce
- 1953–1964 (ret.): Charles Lewis (afterwards archdeacon emeritus)
- 1964–1973: Ivor Philips
- 1973–1976: Ernest Evans
- 1976–1977: (d) Cecil Percival Willis
- 1977–1986 (res.): Clifford Wright
- 1986–1993 (ret.): Barrie Evans
- 1993–1997 (ret.): Keith Tyte
- 1997–2008: Kenneth Sharpe
- 2008–2012: Glyndwr Hackett
- 9 September 2012–present: Jonathan Williams

Newport archdeaconry was split in 2018 to create Gwent Valleys archdeaconry

=== Archdeacons of the Gwent Valleys ===
The archdeaconry was erected from Newport archdeaconry in 2018.

- 7 July 2018 – 24 July 2021 (d.): Sue Pinnington
- 19 June 2022 – present: Stella Bailey

Stella Bailey (born 1976) was collated Archdeacon of the Gwent Valleys on 19 June 2022. She first studied theology at Westhill College, Birmingham, then worked in factories before joining West Midlands Police. Bailey trained for the ministry at Ripon College Cuddesdon and received orders in the Church of England: she was made deacon at Petertide 2009 (5 July) — by Christopher Cocksworth, Bishop of Coventry, at Coventry Cathedral — and ordained priest the following Petertide (3 July 2010) by John Stroyan, Bishop of Warwick, at Coventry Cathedral. Her title post (curacy) was at Walsgrave on Sowe, after which she served as Vicar of St Mary Magdalen, Coventry. Her last post before becoming archdeacon was at Kenilworth, where she also became Area Dean. In Monmouth diocese, Bailey serves as both Archdeacon and Director of Mission.

== List of churches ==
APC = ancient parish church; MC = medieval chapel.

=== Newport Cathedral ===
This was formed from the parish of Newport St Woolos. Under the revised Cathedrals Scheme of the Constitution of the Church in Wales, it stands separate from the Ministry Area/parish structure and is managed by a charitable trust. As of November 2024 it was served by one Dean and two Residentiary Canons.

Church	Founded (building)
Cathedral of St Woolos, Newport	circa AD 500

=== Archdeaconry of Monmouth ===
==== Abergavenny Town and Villages Ministry Area ====
This was formed from the parishes of Abergavenny Holy Trinity, Abergavenny St Mary, Govilon, Llanelen, Llanfoist and Llanwenarth Citra. It has an estimated population of 14,479. As of November 2024 it was served by one Ministry Area Leader.

Church	Founded (building)	
Holy Trinity, Abergavenny	1840	
Christ Church, Abergavenny	1879	
St Mary, Abergavenny	c. 1537^{1}	
St Peter, Llanwenarth	APC (C19th)	
St Helen, Llanellen	APC	
St Ffwyst, Llanfoist	APC	
Christ Church, Govilon	1860	
Former churches	Founded (building)	Closed
St John, Abergavenny	APC	c. 1543

^{1}previously Abergavenny Priory; became the parish church at the Dissolution

==== Heart of Monmouthshire Ministry Area ====
This was formed from the parishes of Llanddewi Fach and Llanhennock. It has an estimated population of 11,801. As of November 2024 it was served by one Ministry Area Leader and one Vicar.

Church	Founded (building)	
All Saints, Kemeys Commander	APC	
St Aeddan, Bettws Newydd	APC	
Christ Church, Coed-y-paen, Llangybi	1848	
St Andrew, Tredunnock	APC	
St Bartholomew, Llanover	APC	
St Cadoc, Raglan	APC	
St Cybi, Llangybi	APC	
St David, Trostrey	APC	
St Illtud, Mamhilad	APC	
St John the Apostle, Llandenny	APC	
St John the Baptist, Llanhennock	APC	
St Madoc, Llanbadoc	APC	
St Mary, Usk	APC	
St Matthew, Monkswood	MC (1883)	
St Michael, Glascoed	1849	
St Peter, Bryngwyn	APC	
St Peter, Nantyderry, Goytre	APC (1846)	
SS Peter, Paul & John, Llantrisant	APC	
St Tegfeth, Llandegfeth	APC	
St Thomas à Becket, Wolvesnewton	APC	
Former churches	Founded (building)	Closed
St Michael, Llanvihangel Gobion	APC	c. 2019
St John, Llangwm Isaf	MC (1851)	2017
St Michael & All Angels, Gwernesney	APC	pre-2017
St Jerome, Llangwm	APC	
St Mary the Virgin, Llanfair Kilgeddin	APC (1876)	1982
St David, Llangeview	APC	1999
St Llywel, Llanllowell	APC	
St David, Llanddewi Fach, Llandegfeth	APC (1857)	1990s

==== Monmouth or Monmouth Marches Ministry Area ====
This was formed from the parishes of Cwmcarvan, Dingestow, Llandogo, Llanfihangel Tor-Y-Mynydd, Llanfihangel-Ystern-Llewern, Llangattock-Vibon-Avel, Llangovan, Llangunnog, Llanishen, Llansoy, Michel Troy, Monmouth, Overmonnow, Penallt, Penyclawdd, Rockfield, St Maughan's, Tintern Parva, Tregaer, Trellech, Trellech Grange, Whitebrook Chapel and Wonastow. It has an estimated population of 15,483. As of November 2024 it was served by one Ministry Area Leader and one Vicar.

Church	Founded (building)	
St Oudoceus, Llandogo	APC (1861)	
St Michael, Tintern Parva	APC (1846)	
St Denis, Llanishen	APC (1854)	
St Tysoi, Llansoy	APC	
St Michael, Llanfihangel-Tor-y-Mynydd	APC	
Trellech Grange Parish Church	MC (1861)	
St Michael, Mitchel Troy	APC (1876)	
St Mary the Virgin, Monmouth	APC	
St Thomas the Martyr, Overmonnow	MC	
St Wonnow, Wonastow	APC	
St Cenedlon, Rockfield	APC	
St Meugan, St Maughans	APC	
St Dingat, Dingestow	APC	
St Martin, Penyclawdd	APC	
St Michael, Llanfihangel-ystern-Llewern	APC	
St Mary, Tregare	APC	
St Cadoc, Cwmcarvan	APC	
St Nicholas, Trellech	APC	
Old St Mary's Church, Penallt	APC	
Former churches	Founded (building)	Closed
St Cadoc, Llangattock-Vibon-Avel	APC	2019
St Govan, Llangovan	APC	late C20th
St Beuno, Llanfaenor	MC	
St Mary, Tintern	MC (1868)	c. 1977
Holy Trinity, Whitebrook	1840	2004
St John the Baptist, Catbrook	c. 1910	

==== Netherwent Ministry Area ====
This was formed from the parishes of Caerwent, Caldicot Rectorial Benefice, Dinham, Llandevaud, Llanvaches, Llanvair Discoed, Magor Rectorial Benefice, Penhow and St Brides Netherwent. It has an estimated population of 31,844. As of November 2024 it was served by one Ministry Area Leader, one Vicar and two Associate Priests.

Church	Founded (building)	
St Mary the Virgin, Caldicot	APC	
St Mary, Rogiet^{2}	APC	
St Mary, Portskewett	APC	
St Peter, Llandevaud	MC (1843)	
St Dyfrig, Llanvaches	APC	
St Bridget, St Brides Netherwent	APC	
St John the Baptist, Penhow	APC	
SS Stephen & Tathan, Caerwent	APC	
St Mary, Llanfair Discoed	APC	
St Mary Magdalene, Goldcliff	APC	
St Thomas the Apostle, Redwick^{3}	MC	
St Mary, Magor	APC	
St Mary, Nash	APC	
St Mary, Undy	APC	
St Mary, Llanwern	APC	
St Mary, Wilcrick	APC	
St Martin, Llanmartin	APC (1858)	
Former churches	Founded (building)	Closed
Langstone Parish Church^{1}	APC	2023
St Cadwaladr, Bishton^{1}	APC	2023
St Bartholomew, Highmoor, Caerwent	?	
St Michael & All Angels, Llanfihangel Rogiet	APC	1973
St James, Ifton	APC	c. 1755

^{1}monthly services continue in the village hall ^{2}original dedication to St Hilary ^{3}original dedication to St Michael

==== North Monmouthshire Ministry Area ====
This was formed from the parishes of Bettws Chapel, Cwmyoy, Grosmont, Llanarth, Llanddewi Rhyderch, Llanddewi Skirrid, Llanfair Chapel, Llanfihangel Crucorney, Llangattock-Juxta-Usk, Llangattock Lingoed, Llansantffraed, Llanthony, Llantilio Crossenny, Llantilio Pertholey, Llanvapley, Llanvetherine, Oldcastle, Penrhos and Skenfrith. It has an estimated population of 8,429. As of November 2024 it was served by one Ministry Area Leader and one Vicar.

Church	Founded (building)	
St Nicholas, Grosmont	APC	
St Cadoc, Llangattock Lingoed	APC	
St Mary, Llanfair Green	1843	
St Bridget, Skenfrith	APC	
St David, Llanddewi Rhydderch	APC	
St Cadoc, Llangattock-juxta-Usk	APC	
St Bridget, Llansantffraed	APC	
St Michael, Llanfihangel Crucorney	APC	
St David, Llanthony	MC	
St Martin, Cwmyoy	APC	
St Teilo, Llantilio Crossenny	APC	
St Mable, Llanvapley	APC	
St James the Elder, Llanvetherine	APC	
St Cadoc, Penrhos	APC	
St David, Llanddewi Skirrid	APC	
St Teilo, Llantilio Pertholey	APC	
Bettws Chapel, Llantilio Pertholey	MC	
Former churches	Founded (building)	Closed
St John the Baptist, Oldcastle	APC (C19th)	
St Teilo, Llanarth Fawr	APC	2013

==== Severn Wye Ministry Area ====
This was formed from the parishes of Chepstow, Devauden, Itton, Kilgwrrwg, Mathern, Mounton, Newchurch, Penterry, St Arvans, St Pierre and Shirenewton. It has an estimated population of 16,326. As of November 2024 it was served by two Vicars.

Church	Founded (building)	
St Christopher, Bulwark	1950s	
St Mary, Chepstow	APC	
St Arvan, St Arvans	APC	
St Deiniol, Itton	APC	
St Mary, Penterry	APC (C19th)	
Holy Cross, Kilgwrrwg^{1}	APC	
St James, Devauden Green	1829	
St Thomas a Becket, Shirenewton	APC	
St Tewdric, Mathern	APC	
St Andoenus, Mounton	APC (1880s)	
St Peter, St Pierre	APC	
St Peter, Newchurch	APC (c. 1865)	
Former churches	Founded (building)	Closed
Holy Trinity, Sudbrook	APC	C18th
St Mary, Whitson	APC	c. 2018
All Saints, Kemeys Inferior	APC	pre-1960
St Curig, Cat's Ash	MC	post-C16th

^{1}no dedication before 1980s

=== Archdeaconry of the Gwent Valleys ===
==== Cwmbran Ministry Area ====
This was formed from the parishes of Cwmbran and Llanfrechfa. It has an estimated population of 50,472. As of November 2024 it was served by one Ministry Area Leader, two Vicars and one Associate Priest.

Church	Founded (building)	
All Saints, Llanfrechfa	APC	
St Michael, Llanfihangel Llantarnam	APC	
St Gabriel, Cwmbran	1907	
St Mary, Croesyceiliog	1903	
St Peter, Henllys	APC	
Holy Trinity, Pontnewydd	1860	
Former churches	Founded (building)	Closed
St Andrew, Pontrhydyrun		

==== Islwyn Ministry Area ====
This was formed from the parishes of Lower Islwyn and Upper Islwyn. It has an estimated population of 69,489. As of November 2024 it was served by one Ministry Area Leader, three Vicars and one Associate Priest.

Church	Founded (building)	
St Paul, Newbridge	1878 (1928)	
St Peter, Newbridge	late C20th	
St Margaret, Risca	1911	
St Mary, Risca	APC (1853)	
Abercarn Welsh Church	1980s (1853)	
St David, Fleur-de-Lis	1894	
St Augustine, Pontllanfraith	1877	
St Margaret, Blackwood	1876	
St David, Penmaen, Oakdale	1855	
St Thomas, Cefn Fforest	late C20th	
St Theodore, Ynysddu	1925	
St Tudur, Mynyddislwyn	APC	
Former churches	Founded (building)	Closed
St David, Risca	late C20th	
Holy Trinity, Pentwyn-mawr, Newbridge		
St David, Maesycwmmer	c. 1880	C20th
All Saints, Maesycwmmer		
St Luke, Abercarn	1890 (1926)	c. 1980
St Mary, Crumlin	1870s	
Crosskeys Church		
St John the Evangelist, Cwmcarn	pre-1925 (c. 1925)	

==== Mid Torfaen Ministry Area ====
This was formed from the parish of Mid Torfaen. It has an estimated population of 37,768. As of November 2024 it was served by one Ministry Area Leader and one Vicar.

Church	Founded (building)	
St Cadoc, Trevethin	APC (1845)	
St John the Divine, Waunfelin	1912	
St Matthew, Pontypool	1895	
St Michael & All Angels, Llanvihangel Pontymoel	APC	
St Mary, Panteg	APC	
St Hilda, Griffithstown	1888	
St Oswald, Sebastopol	1915	
Former churches	Founded (building)	Closed
St James, Pontypool	1820	
St Thomas, Talywain, Abersychan	1832	2004
St John, Garndiffaith	1932	2011
All Saints, Pontnewynydd	1906	2014
St Luke, Pontnewynydd	1873	c. 1990s

==== Mynydd Bedwellte Ministry Area ====
This was formed from the parishes of Rhymney, Tredegar and Upper Islwyn. It has an estimated population of 36,071. As of November 2024 it was served by one Ministry Area Leader, one Associate Vicar and one Assistant Curate.

Church	Founded (building)	
St Peter, Aberbargoed	C20th	
St Sannan, Bedwellty	APC	
St Dingat, New Tredegar	1893	
St David, Rhymney	1840	
St Paul, Abertysswg	c. 1910	
St George, Tredegar	1836	
Former churches	Founded (building)	Closed
St Matthew, Rhymney	1842	1970s
St Mark, Rhymney	c. 1890	post-1950
Sirhowy Mission Church, Tredegar	pre-1920	
St David's Mission Church, Troedrhiwgwair		
St James, Georgetown	1890	2016
St Michael, New Tredegar	c. 1890	c. 2013
St Teilo, Troedrhiwfuwch, New Tredegar	1875	1980s
St John, Markham		
SS Philip & James, Gwrhay, Argoed	1853	post-1950

==== St Illtyd Ministry Area ====
This was formed from the parishes of Abertillery, Blaenavon, Capel Newydd, Cwmtillery, Llanhilleth, Six Bells and Upper Ebbw Valleys. It was formerly known as the Upper Eastern Valleys Ministry Area. It has an estimated population of 58,649. As of November 2024 it was served by one Ministry Area Leader.

Church	Founded (building)	
St Michael, Abertillery	1854 (1899)	
St Paul, Cwmtillery	1890	
St John, Six Bells	1905 (1969)	
St Paul, Capel Newydd, Blaenavon	1893	
St Peter, Blaenavon	1805	
Christ Church, Ebbw Vale	1861	
St David, Beaufort	1891	
St Peter, Blaina (Aberystruth)	APC (1960s)	
Holy Trinity & St Anne, Nantyglo^{1}	1882 (C20th)	
Former churches	Founded (building)	Closed
St Mark, Llanhilleth	1898	c. 2023
St Paul, Cwm	1882	c. 2023
St James, Blaenavon	c. 1890 (1911)	
St David, Llanhilleth		
St Illtyd, Llanhilleth	APC (c. 1500)	1957
St John the Baptist, Ebbw Vale	1909	pre-1992
St Mary, Victoria, Ebbw Vale	1897	
Holy Trinity, Nantyglo	1854	mid-1960s
St Andrew, Beaufort Hill, Beaufort	1895	
All Saints, Blaina	pre-1920	
St John, Beaufort	1843	1890
St John's Mission Church, Newtown, Beaufort	1893	
Christ Church, Aberbeeg	1907	2012
St John, Garn-yr-erw		pre-2000

^{1}original dedication to St Anne

=== Archdeaconry of Newport ===
==== Beechwood Ministry Area ====
This was formed from the parishes of Caerleon, Newport Christ Church, Newport Maindee, Newport St Andrew, Newport St Julian and Newport St Teilo. It has an estimated population of 63,831. As of November 2024 it was served by one Ministry Area Leader, two Vicars and one Associate Priest.

Church	Founded (building)	
St Cadoc, Llangattock-juxta-Caerleon	APC	
Holy Trinity, Christchurch	APC	
St John the Evangelist, Maindee	1860	
St Andrew, Newport	1882	
SS Julius & Aaron, Newport	1891 (1926)	
St Teilo, Alway, Newport	1952 (1976).	
Former churches	Founded (building)	Closed
St Philip, Newport	1925	c. 2023
St Mary, Newport		c. 2023
St Matthew, Maindee	1892	2013

==== East Cardiff Ministry Area ====
This was formed from the parishes of Cyncoed, Llanrumney, Rumney and St Mellons. It has an estimated population of 75,380. As of November 2024 it was served by one Ministry Area Leader and three Vicars.

Church	Founded (building)
Pontprennau Community Church	2003
All Saints, Cyncoed	1923
St Edeyrn, Llanedeyrn^{1}	APC
All Saints, Llanedeyrn	1970s
St David, Pentwyn	1970s
St Dyfrig, Llanrumney	C20th
St Augustine, Rumney	APC
St Mellon, St Mellons	APC
Resurrection, St Mellons (LEP)	late C20th

^{1}in the ancient county of Glamorgan, not Monmouthshire

==== Mountain and Marsh Ministry Area ====
This was formed from the parishes of Bedwas, Machen, Marshfield, Michaelston-Y-Fedw, Rudry and St Bride's Wentloog. It has an estimated population of 17,845. As of November 2024 it was served by one Ministry Area Leader.

Church	Founded (building)	
St Barrwg, Bedwas	APC	
St Thomas, Trethomas	C19th (2002)	
St John the Baptist, Upper Machen	1855	
St Michael, Lower Machen	APC	
St Michael, Michaelston-y-Fedw	APC	
St James, Rudry	APC	
St Mary, Marshfield	APC	
St Bridget, St Brides Wentloog	APC	
Former churches	Founded (building)	Closed
All Saints, Coedkernew	APC (1853)	
St Peter, Peterstone Wentlooge	APC	

==== Newport North West Ministry Area ====
This was formed from the parishes of Bettws, Malpas, Newport All Saints, Newport Maesglas and Newport St Mark. It has an estimated population of 36,713. As of November 2024 it was served by one Ministry Area Leader, two Vicars and one Associate Priest.

Church	Founded (building)	
St David, Bettws	APC (C17th)	
St Mary, Malpas	APC (1850)	
All Saints, Newport	1898 (c. 2010)	
St Stephen, Newport	1884	
St Mark, Newport	1874	
Former churches	Founded (building)	Closed
St Paul, Newport	1836	2016
St Mark's Mission Church, Allt-yr-yn		

==== Tredegar Park Ministry Area ====
This was formed from the parishes of Bassaleg, Maesglas St Thomas, Newport St John the Baptist and The Gaer. It has an estimated population of 42,023. As of November 2024 it was served by one Ministry Area Leader, two Vicars and one Assistant Curate.

Church	Founded (building)	
St Basil, Bassaleg	APC	
St John the Baptist, Rogerstone	1887	
St John the Baptist, Newport	1900	
St Martin-in-the-Gaer, Newport	1950s	
St Thomas, Newport		
Former churches	Founded (building)	Closed
St Anne, Rogerstone	1933 (1958)	
Holy Trinity, Pillgwenlly	1851	C20th

== Dedications ==
=== Medieval churches (chapelries in italics) ===
- All Saints: Coedkernew, Kemeys Commander, Kemeys Inferior, Llanfrechfa
- Holy Trinity: Christchurch, Sudbrook
- St Andoenus: Mounton
- St Andrew: Tredunnock
- St Arvan: St Arvans
- St Augustine: Rumney
- St Baruc: Bedwas
- St Basil of Caesarea: Bassaleg
- St Bartholomew: Llanover
- St Beuno: Llanfaenor
- St Bridget: Llansantffraed, St Brides Netherwent, St Brides Wentloog, Skenfrith
- St Cadoc: Cwmcarvan, Llangattock-juxta-Caerleon, Llangattock-juxta-Usk, Llangattock-lingoed, Llangattock-vibon-Avel, Penrhos, Raglan, Trevethin
- St Cadwaladr: Bishton
- St Cenedlon: Rockfield
- St Curig: Cat's Ash
- St Cybi: Llangybi
- St David: Bettws, Llanddewifach, Llanddewirhydderch, Llanddewi-skirrid, Llangeview, Llanthony, Trostrey
- St Deiniol: Itton
- St Denis: Llanishen
- St Dingad: Dingestow
- St Dubricius: Llanvaches
- St Edern: Llanedeyrn
- St Ffwyst: Llanfoist
- St Govan: Llangovan
- St Gwynllyw: Newport
- St Helen: Llanellen
- St Hilary: Rogiet
- St Illtud: Llanhilleth, Mamhilad
- St James: Ifton, Llanvetherine, Rudry
- St Jerome: Llangwm
- St John the Baptist: Abergavenny, Llangwmisaf, Llanhennock, Oldcastle, Penhow
- St John the Evangelist: Llandenny
- St Llywel: Llanllowell
- St Mable: Llanvapley
- St Maedoc or Aeddan: Bettwsnewydd, Llanbadoc
- St Martin: Cwmyoy, Llanmartin, Penyclawdd
- St Mary: Caldicot, Chepstow, Llanfairdiscoed, Llanfairkilgeddin, Llanwern, Magor, Malpas, Marshfield, Monmouth, Nash, Panteg, Penallt, Penterry, Portskewett, Risca, Tintern, Tregare, Undy, Usk, Whitson, Wilcrick
- St Mary Magdalene: Goldcliff
- St Matthew: Monkswood
- St Mawgan: St Maughans
- St Mellonius or Melaine: St Mellons
- St Michael: Gwernesney, Llanfihangelcrucorney, Llanfihangelgobion, Llanfihangelllantarnam, Llanfihangelpontymoel, Llanfihangelrogiet, Llanfihangeltorymynydd, Llanfihangelysternllewern, Machen, Michaelston-y-Fedw, Mitchel Troy, Redwick, Tintern Parva
- St Nicholas: Grosmont, Trellech
- St Oudoceus: Llandogo
- St Peter: Aberystruth, Bryngwyn, Goytre, Henllys, Llandevaud, Llanwenarth, Newchurch, Peterstone Wentlooge, St Pierre
- SS Peter, Paul & John: Llantrisant
- St Sannan: Bedwellte
- SS Stephen & Tathan: Caerwent
- St Tegfeth: Llandegfeth
- St Teilo: Llanarthfawr, Llantilio-crossenny, Llantilio-pertholey
- St Tewdrig: Mathern
- St Thomas Becket: Overmonnow, Shirenewton, Wolvesnewton
- St Tudur: Mynyddislwyn
- St Tysoi: Llansoy
- St Winwaloe: Wonastow
- No dedication/dedication unknown: Bettws, Kilgwrrwg, Langstone, Trellech Grange

=== Post-medieval churches ===
- All Saints: Blaina (C19th/20th), Cyncoed (1923), Llanedeyrn (1970s), Maesycwmmer (?), Newport (1898), Pontnewynydd (1906)
- Christ Church: Aberbeeg (1907), Abergavenny (1879), Coedypaen (1848), Ebbw Vale (1861), Govilon (1860)
- Holy Trinity: Abergavenny (1840), Nantyglo (1854), Newbridge (?), Pillgwenlly (1851), Pontnewydd (1860), Whitebrook (1840)
- Resurrection: St Mellons (C20th)
- St Andrew: Beaufort (1895), Newport (1882), Pontrhydyrun (?)
- St Anne: Nantyglo (1882), Rogerstone (1933)
- St Augustine: Pontllanfraith (1877)
- St Bartholomew: Highmoor (?)
- St Christopher: Bulwark (1950s)
- St David: Beaufort (1891), Fleur-de-Lis (1894), Llanhilleth (?), Maesycwmmer (1880), Penmaen (1855), Pentwyn (1970s), Rhymney (1840), Risca (C20th), Troedrhiwgwair (?)
- St Dingad: New Tredegar (1893)
- St Dubricius: Llanrumney (C20th)
- St Gabriel: Cwmbran (1907)
- St George: Tredegar (1836)
- St Hilda: Griffithstown (1888)
- St James: Blaenavon (1890), Devauden Green (1829), Georgetown (1890), Pontypool (1820)
- St John the Baptist: Catbrook (1910), Ebbw Vale (1909), Machen (1855), Newport (1900), Rogerstone (1887)
- St John the Evangelist: Beaufort (x2) (1843, 1893), Cwmcarn (C19th/20th), Garndiffaith (1932), Garnyrerw (?), Maindee (1860), Markham (?), Six Bells (1905), Waunfelin (1912)
- SS Julius & Aaron: Newport (1891)
- St Luke: Abercarn (1890), Pontnewynydd (1873)
- St Margaret: Blackwood (1876), Risca (1911)
- St Mark: Alltyryn (?), Llanhilleth (1898), Newport (1874), Rhymney (1890)
- St Martin: Newport (1950s)
- St Mary: Abergavenny (1537), Croesyceiliog (1903), Crumlin (1870s), Ebbw Vale (1897), Llanfair Green (1843), Newport (?)
- St Matthew: Maindee (1892), Pontypool (1895), Rhymney (1842)
- St Michael: Abertillery (1854), Glascoed (1849), New Tredegar (1890)
- St Oswald: Sebastopol (1915)
- St Paul: Abertysswg (1910), Blaenavon (1893), Cwm (1882), Cwmtillery (1890), Newbridge (1878), Newport (1836)
- St Peter: Aberbargoed (C20th), Blaenavon (1805), Newbridge (C20th)
- St Philip: Newport (1925)
- SS Philip & James the Less: Gwrhay (1853)
- St Stephen: Newport (1884)
- St Teilo: Newport (1952), Troedrhiwfuwch (1875)
- St Theodore: Ynysddu (1925)
- St Thomas the Apostle: Abersychan (1832), Cefnfforest (C20th), Newport (?), Trethomas (C19th)
- No dedication/dedication unknown: Abercarn (1980s), Crosskeys (?), Pontprennau (2003), Sirhowy (C19th/20th)

== See also ==
- List of Church in Wales churches
