= David Roberts (priest) =

Welsh Anglican priest (died 1935)

David Egryn Roberts was a Welsh Anglican priest, most notably Archdeacon of Monmouth from 1926 until 1930.

The son of Griffith Roberts, Dean of Bangor Roberts was educated at Llandovery College and Jesus College, Oxford. He was ordained deacon in 1899; and priest in 1900. He was an Assistant Master at Llandovery College from Aberavon and Curate of Llandingat from 1899 to 1902; and of Mountain Ash from 1902 to 1910. He was Perpetual curate of Miskin from 1910 to 1916; and Vicar of Trevethin from 1916 until his appointment as an archdeacon. He was also Vicar of St. Woolos Pro-Cathedral, Newport from 1926 to 1930.

He died from pneumonia at St Andrews Hospital Northampton on 25 August 1935.

Church in Wales titles
Preceded by David Griffiths	Archdeacon of Monmouth; 1926–1930	Succeeded by Alfred Monahan
