= Ivor Philips =

Archdeacon of Newport from 1964–1973

- Born: 1904
- Died: 1997 (aged 92–93)

Ivor Lloyd Phillips, MC (1904–1997) was Archdeacon of Newport from 1964 to 1973.

Phillips was educated at Aberystwyth University and St Michael's College, Llandaff. He was ordained deacon in 1931 and priest in 1932. After curacies in Machen and Maindee he was a Military Chaplain from 1939 to 1946. He served with the Pembrokeshire Yeomanry in Italy and was awarded the Military Cross. When peace returned he was Vicar of St Paul, Newport from 1946 to 1965; and Rector of Tredunnock from 1965 to 1973.
