= Griffith Roberts =

British bishop (1845–1943)

- Born: 27 June 1845
- Died: 11 February 1943 (aged 97)
- Education: Trinity College Dublin
- Occupations: Anglican priest, author
- Title: Dean of Bangor
- Predecessor: John Pryce
- Successor: Henry Lewis James
- Children: David Roberts (Archdeacon of Monmouth)

Griffith Roberts (27 June 1845 – 11 February 1943) was an Anglican priest and author. His works include "The Marks of Christ’s Body", 1891; "Salvation Through Atonement", 1910; "Why We Believe that Christ rose from the Dead", 1914; "Holiadur Eglswysig", 1888; and "A Guide to Bangor Cathedral" in the first third of the 20th century, and Howell Harris, a biography. Educated at Trinity College Dublin, he was ordained in 1870. He held incumbencies at Llanegryn, Dowlais and Peterston-super-Ely before being appointed Dean of Bangor in 1903. He retired in 1934 and died at the age of 97.

His son David was Archdeacon of Monmouth from 1930 to 1935.

Church in Wales titles
Preceded by John Pryce	Dean of Bangor; 1903–1934	Succeeded by Henry Lewis James
