= Cadoc (disambiguation) =

Cadoc is the name of a 6th-century saint.

Cadoc may also refer to:

- Cadoc of Cornwall, an 11th-century prince
- Cadoc (electoral ward), an area of the town of Barry, Vale of Glamorgan, Wales

== See also ==
- St Cadoc's Church (disambiguation)
