= St Catwg's Church, Cwmcarvan =

Church of St Catwg
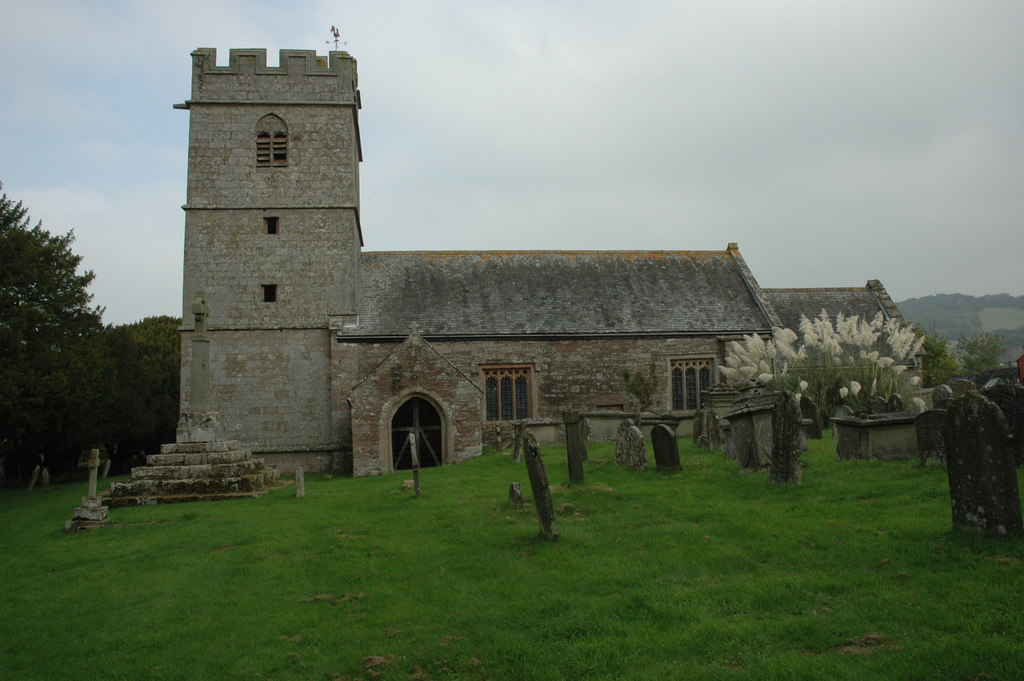
- " a fine early Tudor tower"

- Location in Monmouthshire
- 51.7638°N 2.7585°W
- Location: Cwmcarvan, Monmouthshire
- Country: Wales
- Denomination: Church in Wales

History
- Status: parish church
- Founded: 14th century

Architecture
- Functional status: Active
- Heritage designation: Grade II*
- Designated: 27 November 1953
- Architect: John Prichard,
- Architectural type: Church
- Style: Perpendicular

Administration
- Diocese: Monmouth
- Archdeaconry: Monmouth
- Deanery: Monmouth
- Parish: Cwmcarvan

Clergy
- Priest: The Reverend G J R Williams

The Church of St Catwg in Cwmcarvan, Monmouthshire, Wales, is a parish church dating from the late 13th or early 14th century. It is dedicated to Saint Catwg or Cadoc, a 5th/6th-century Welsh saint. The existing building dates mainly from the 15th century, including its Tudor tower dating from 1525. The church was extensively restored by John Prichard in 1872–1879. It is an active parish church and a Grade II* listed building.

== History ==
The origins of the church may be Norman. There was certainly a structure by the late 13th or early 14th centuries, when the church was a chapel of ease to St Michael's Church in Mitchel Troy. A substantial rebuilding took place in the 16th century; the tower is datable to 1525 by a reference in a will. In the late 19th century the church was extensively restored by John Prichard. It remains an active church in the parish of Cwmcarvan.

== Architecture and description ==
The style of the church is Perpendicular. The architectural historian John Newman describes the tower as "austerely impressive". It is of ashlar, without buttresses. The nave, dual porches and chancel are of Old Red Sandstone. The church is a Grade II* listed building, its listing recording the building's "fine early Tudor tower".
