= Ernest Evans (priest) =

Welsh Anglican priest

Ernest Percival Evans (1916–1984) was a Welsh Anglican priest, most notably Archdeacon of Monmouth from 1963 to 1973 and Archdeacon of Newport from then until 1976.

Evans was educated at Keble College, Oxford and Ely Theological College. He was ordained deacon in 1939; and priest in 1940. He was Curate of Abergavenny then St John the Baptist, Newport. During World War II he was a Chaplain to the Forces. He was Chaplain to the Bishop of Monmouth from 1947 and Vicar of Chepstow until 1964. He then became vicar of Llantilio Cresseny and Llanvihangel-Ystern-Llewern until retirement.

Church in Wales titles
Preceded by Joseph Ralph Jones	Archdeacon of Monmouth; 1963–1973	Succeeded by Royston Clifford Wright
