= Dominic Walker (bishop) =

British Anglican bishop (born 1948)

The Right Reverend Dominic Walker OGS DL
- Bishop of Monmouth
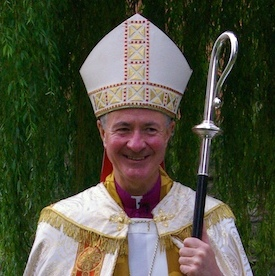
- Walker in 2009
- Diocese: Diocese of Monmouth
- In office: 2003–2013
- Predecessor: Rowan Williams
- Successor: Richard Pain
- Other post: area Bishop of Reading (1997–2002)

Orders
- Ordination: 1972 (priest)
- Consecration: 1 May 1997

Personal details
- Born: Edward William Murray Walker; 28 June 1948 (age 78)
- Denomination: Anglicanism
- Profession: Bishop, theologian
- Education: King's College London; Heythrop College, London

Edward William Murray "Dominic" Walker OGS DL (born 28 June 1948) is a retired Anglican bishop. He was the Bishop of Reading, an area bishop, from 1997 to 2002 and Bishop of Monmouth from 2003 to 2013.

== Early life ==
Walker was the eldest child to a Welsh mother and English father. He was brought up on Dartmoor. He was educated at Plymouth College King's College London (where he trained for the priesthood and gained an Associateship of King's College or AKC), Heythrop College in London (gaining a postgraduate Master of Arts {MA} in 1997) and the University of Wales (becoming a Master of Laws {LLM}).

== Ordained ministry ==
Walker was ordained priest in 1972. He began his ministry with a curacy at St Faith's Southwark after which he was domestic chaplain to Mervyn Stockwood, Bishop of Southwark; rector of Newington St Mary; Team Rector of St Peter, St Nicholas & the Chapel Royal Brighton, Rural Dean of Brighton and a canon and prebendary of Chichester Cathedral.

Walker is a member of the Oratory of the Good Shepherd. He served as Father Superior from 1990 to 1996 and subsequently as Fr Provincial of the European Province.

Walker was appointed Bishop of Reading, an area bishop in the Diocese of Oxford, in 1997. He was consecrated a bishop on 1 May 1997 at Southwark Cathedral, by George Carey, Archbishop of Canterbury. He then became a diocesan bishop as the Bishop of Monmouth in the Church in Wales in 2003, succeeding Rowan Williams who had become the Archbishop of Canterbury in the Church of England.

Walker's last episcopal seat was at Newport Cathedral. At the end of 2012, it was announced that he intended to retire, which he did on 30 June 2013. In retirement he is an honorary assistant bishop in the Diocese of Llandaff.

== Views on animal welfare ==
Walker has strong views on animal welfare. He joined the RSPCA as a teenager and is president of the Anglican Society for the Welfare of Animals. In 2010 he called for church services to "pray for animal casualties" of warfare and consistently opposes the live animal exportation market. His views were expressed in a speech when he said that:

... I would suggest that we need to stop and repent – to look and think again about our role in creation. If you say to most Christians, what was the great moment in the biblical creation narratives, they will say when God made us in his own image. That's wrong. It was the seventh day when God rested and the world was at peace. There is a theme in the Hebrew scriptures that tells us that we only ate meat after the Fall and it looks forward to a return to Paradise where the lion will lie down with the lamb. Our role in creation is to have dominion – not domination – perhaps stewardship is a better word – to have stewardship of creation knowing that we shall be judged for how we have cared for God's world and that includes all sentient beings. Secondly, I think we need to put animals on the church agenda. We could begin by including them in our prayers. At this time of year I attend various harvest celebrations and we pray for the farmers, the food producers and the crops – but rarely do we pray for animals.

When a vicar in Brighton, he gave permission for animals to be present in the church. Also while in Brighton he, alongside Andrew Bowden, participated in a demonstration against live animal exportation.

As of 2020, Walker is still vice-president of the RSPCA.

== Paranormal and exorcisms ==
Walker is an expert on the paranormal and has published many articles on the topic. He is a trained exorcist and has said that during his 35 years of ordained ministry he has performed "countless acts of deliverance along with six exorcisms".

In an August 2015 article, which concentrated on the death of Morgan Freeman's step-granddaughter, Walker rejected the use of violence when performing an exorcism.

== Retirement ==
Upon retirement, Walker became a "humble monk". He has since settled in Monmouth and continues to deliver conference papers and lectures. He lectured in July 2015 at a conference held at the University of Warwick.

Church of England titles
Preceded by John Bone	Bishop of Reading; 1997–2003	Succeeded by Stephen Cottrell
Church in Wales titles
Preceded by Rowan Williams	Bishop of Monmouth; 2003–2013	Succeeded by Richard Pain
