= St Mark's Church, Newport =

Anglican Church in Newport, Wales

St Mark's Church
- St Mark the Evangelist, Gold Tops, Newport
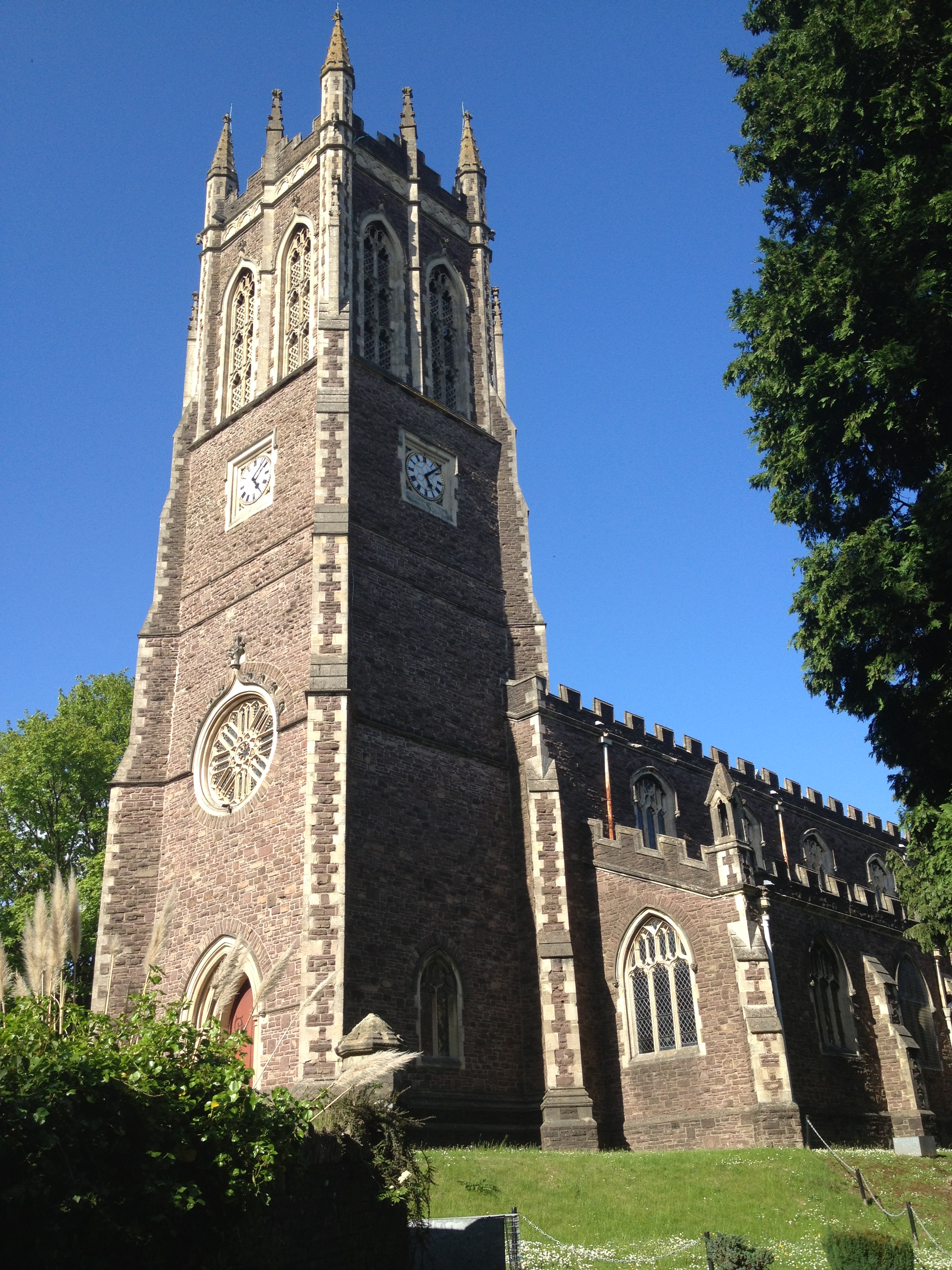
- St Mark's Church
- 51°35′22.5″N 3°00′10.1″W
- Location: Newport
- Country: Wales
- Denomination: Church in Wales
- Previous denomination: Church of England (before 1920)
- Website: stmarkschurchnewport.orgheartofnewportma.org.uk

History
- Status: Active
- Founded: 20 July 1872
- Dedication: St Mark the Evangelist
- Consecrated: 4 July 1874

Architecture
- Functional status: Parish church
- Heritage designation: Grade II (Cadw)
- Architect(s): Habershon, Pite, Fawckner
- Style: Neo-gothic
- Years built: 1872–74
- Completed: July 1874
- Construction cost: £6,000 (approx)

Administration
- Province: Wales
- Diocese: Monmouth
- Archdeaconry: Newport
- Deanery: Heart of Newport
- Parish: Heart of Newport Ministry Area

Clergy
- Bishop: Cherry Vann
- Vicar: Rev Andrew Lightbown (Ministry Area Leader)
- Priest(s): Rev Frances Jones, Rev Richard Mulcahy

St Mark's Church, Gold Tops, (Welsh: Eglwys Sant Marc ) is a Church in Wales (Anglican) church located in the Allt-yr-yn area of Newport, Wales. It is a Newport landmark and is part of the Heart of Newport Ministry Area.

== History ==
The Victorian church was built in the 1870s due to the growing population of St Woolos parish and of Newport as a whole. The land upon which the church was built belonged to Charles Morgan, 1st Baron Tredegar but was donated to the church on condition that a total of £4,000 be collected for the building work by the end of 1870. Even though the money collected was still £1,000 short of that target, the foundation stone was laid by Lady Tredegar on 20 July 1872. The church building was completed by 1874 and consecrated by the Bishop of Llandaff, the Right Reverend Dr Alfred Ollivant on 4 July 1874. Due to the proximity of the church to Newport Civic Centre, it has been used for various civic services, such as Scout and Guide events.

=== Recent years ===
The area immediately around St Mark's has changed from residential to business, and the wider changes in church attendance meant that by 2013 there were fears that the church might have to close after the retirement of the then Vicar, Canon Andrew Willie. During Canon Willie’s incumbency the heating system was renewed, the church redecorated, masonry work refurbished and repointed where necessary, and the fine three manual organ by Conacher was rebuilt by Nicholson's of Malvern. Quilted banners depicting the life of St Mark were commissioned: these were designed and made by church members, Mr Terry Wooff (who was also a Lay Reader in the parish), his wife Ida, and Mrs Myrna Brown. They hang on the balcony. The church also contains plaques that were originally on the monument in St Woolos Cemetery to the victims of the Newport Docks disaster in 1909. These had been stolen and recovered, and placed in the church as a more secure home than the cemetery..

The Church Hall on Queen's Hill was sold and the money raised, together with the proceeds of parish fundraising events, was used to revamp the interior of the church including provision of a buttery kitchen, secure vestry space and a meeting room. This work was completed in the summer of 2013. Canon Willie retired in 2013 but the church remained open for worship, and in 2014 the Revd Dr Paul Thompson was appointed. The parish went full circle by becoming joined again with the Cathedral and Canon Thompson built on the groundwork done by his predecessors.

=== Present day ===
Under the new constitutional arrangements for cathedrals in the Church in Wales, Newport Cathedral became a separate entity and in 2020 St Mark's became part of the Newport North West Ministry Area. This was renamed the Heart of Newport Ministry Area - Ardal Weinidogaeth Calon Casnewydd - by Archbishop Cherry Vann on 31 August 2025. The area includes the churches and communities of:

- All Saints, Brynglas
- St David, Bettws
- St Mark, Gold Tops
- St Mary, Malpas
- St Stephen, Pillgwenlly

on the western side of the River Usk in the city.

== Notable clergy ==
- John Roland Lloyd Thomas, later Dean of Monmouth and subsequently Principal of St David's College, Lampeter, was vicar from 1949 to 1952
- Raymond Ellis Evans, later Dean of Monmouth, was vicar in 1952 to 1953
- Noël Debroy Jones, later Bishop of Sodor and Man, was assistant curate from 1957 to 1960
- Gareth Lewis, later Dean of Monmouth, was vicar from 1978 to 1982
- Kenneth Sharpe, later Archdeacon of Newport, was vicar from 1982 to 1997
