= Barrie Evans =

Barrie Evans may refer to:

- Barrie Evans (priest)
- Barrie Evans (speedway rider)

== See also ==
- Barry Evans (disambiguation)
