= Samuel Davies (priest) =

Welsh priest (1879–1963)

Samuel Morris Davies (1879–1963) was a Welsh Anglican priest, most notably Archdeacon of Monmouth from 1940 until 1954.

Davies was educated at Sidney Sussex College, Cambridge and Wells Theological College. He was ordained deacon in 1902; and priest in 1903. He was Curate of Corsham from 1903 to 1910; and Chaplain to Lord Islington from 1910 to 1912. On his return from New Zealand he held incumbencies at Machen, Rogiet, Rumney and Penhow.

He is buried at Tal-y-bont Public Cemetery.

Church in Wales titles
Preceded by David Roberts	Archdeacon of Monmouth; 1926–1930	Succeeded by Alfred Monahan
