= Peter Woodman (priest) =

British Anglican priest (born 1936)

Peter Wilfred Woodman (b December 1936) is a retired Anglican priest.

Woodman was educated at St David's College, Lampeter and Wycliffe Hall Oxford. He was ordained deacon in 1960 and priest in 1961. After curacies in New Tredegar, Newport and Llanfrechfa he was Archbishop's Messenger for Edwin Morris. He was Vicar of Llantilio Pertholey from 1967 to 1974; of Bassaleg from 1974 to 1990; and Caerwent from 1990 to 1996. He was Archdeacon of Monmouth from 1993 to 2001. As archdeacon Woodman worked closely with Bishop Rowan Williams, later the Archbishop of Canterbury.
