= Ernest Evans =

Ernest Evans may refer to:

- Ernest E. Evans (1908–1944), U.S. Navy officer who was awarded the Medal of Honor
  - USS Ernest E. Evans
- Ernest Evans (politician) (1885–1965), Welsh politician
- the real name of singer Chubby Checker
- Ernest Evans (cricketer) (1861–1948), English cricketer who played for Somerset
- Ernest Evans (priest), Welsh Anglican priest
- Ernie Evans, member of the Queensland Legislative Assembly

== See also ==
- Earnest Evans, a 1991 video game for the Sega Genesis and Sega CD
