= St John's Church, Maindee =

St John's Church
- The Parish Church of St John the Evangelist, Maindee
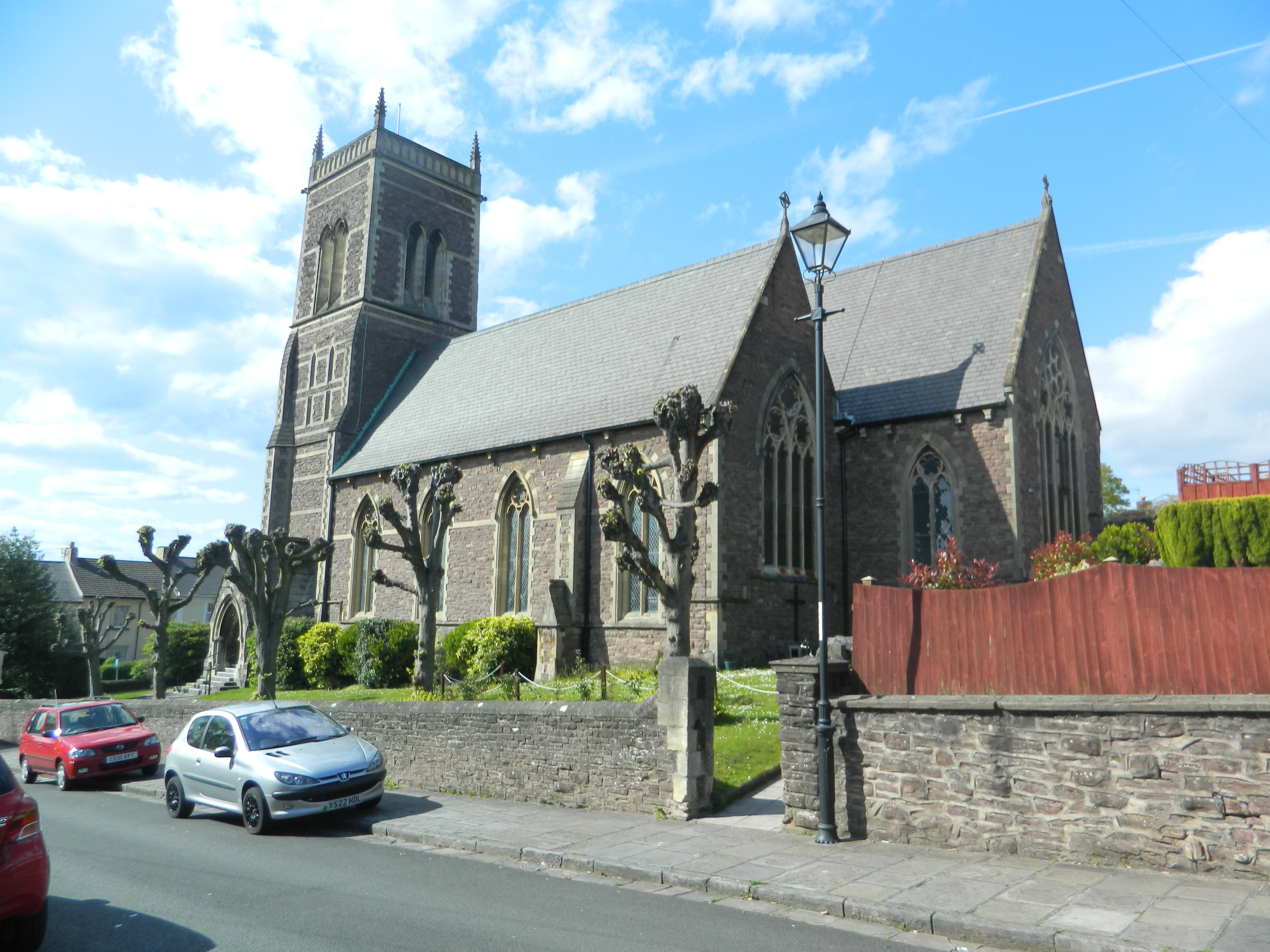
- St John's Church
- 51.5908°N 2.9742°W
- Location: Newport
- Country: Wales
- Denomination: Church in Wales

History
- Status: Active
- Dedication: St John the Evangelist

Architecture
- Functional status: Parish church
- Style: Neo-gothic
- Years built: 1859–60

Administration
- Diocese: Monmouth
- Archdeaconry: Newport
- Deanery: Newport
- Parish: Maindee

Clergy
- Bishop: Richard Pain

The Church of St John is a Victorian Church in Wales parish church in Maindee, Newport, Wales.

== History ==
The church was built between 1859 and 1860 by Prichard and Seddon of Llandaff. The tower was completed in 1911 by John Coates Carter. The church was devastated by bomb damage in 1941. The church interior was reconstructed between 1951 and 1952, after an arson attack on 11 November 1949. It was reopened by the Bishop of Monmouth on 18 September 1952.
