= 27 Old Market Street, Usk =

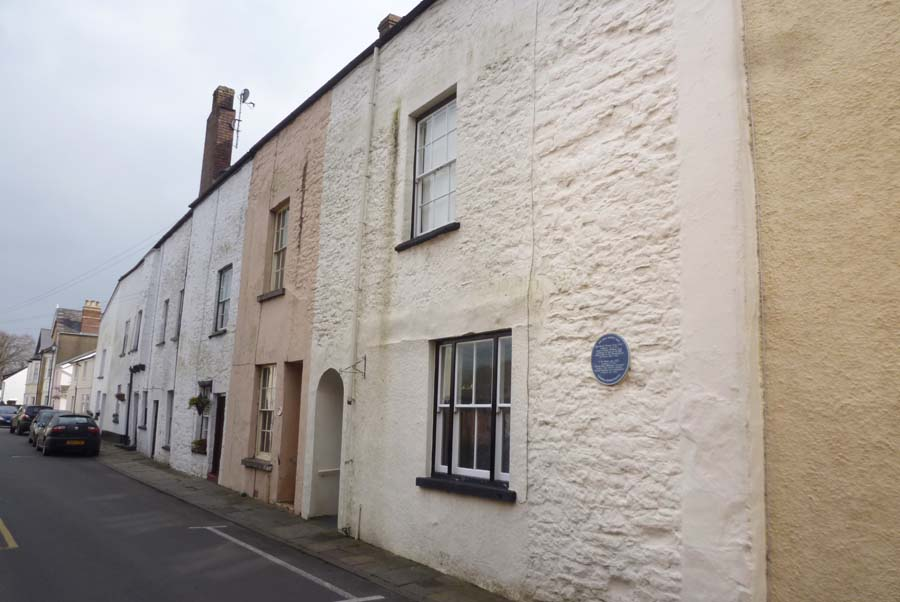
- The range of terraced housing of which No. 27 stands on the right of the photograph

- Location within Monmouthshire
- 51.7004°N 2.9033°W
- Type: House
- Location: Usk, Monmouthshire

History
- Built: C16th

Site notes
- Governing body: Private

Listed Building – Grade II*
- Official name: 27, Old Market Street, Usk
- Designated: 16 February 1953
- Reference no.: 82730

27 Old Market Street, Usk, Monmouthshire, forms part of a range of terraced houses which were originally the Great House of Roger Williams, High Sheriff of Monmouthshire in the mid-16th century. It is a Grade II* listed building.

== History and description ==
The original building, "of exceptional height", was constructed in the middle of the 16th century as a townhouse by Roger Williams of Llangybi. The house comprised the entire range, from No.s 17-27.

27, Old Market Street, UskWilliams was High Sheriff of Monmouthshire in 1561-2 and had purchased the majority of the remains of Usk Priory following the Dissolution in 1536-41. Williams must also have had access to the remains of Usk Castle as much of the stone for the construction of his house came from that site.

In the early 19th century, the house was divided into a number of separate dwellings and many of the interior fittings, including the main staircase, were removed. As at May 2021, No.27 is for sale.

The building is of stone, party colour-washed and partly rendered. The interior of No.27 retains its original ceiling plasterwork. The architectural historian John Newman described the ceiling on the lower floor as decorated with "rosettes, shields and floral sprigs." No.27 is designated a Grade II* listed building on account of these ceilings. The remaining buildings in the range are designated Grade II listed buildings.
