= Jonathan Williams (priest) =

Welsh Anglican priest

Jonathan Simon Williams (born 1960) is a Welsh Anglican priest: since 2012 he has been Archdeacon of Newport.

Williams was educated at the University of Wales and the College of the Resurrection, Mirfield. He was made deacon at Petertide 1986 (28 June) and ordained priest the following Petertide (27 June 1987) — both times by Roy Davies, Bishop of Llandaff, at Llandaff Cathedral; and began his career with a curacies at Gelligaer and Cwmbran. He held incumbencies at Marshfield, and Bassaleg. He was collated archdeacon on 9 September 2012. As well as being Archdeacon he is also Precentor of Newport Cathedral.
