= St Mapley's Church, Llanvapley =

Coordinates: 51.8218°N 2.9201°W

Church of St Mapley, Llanvapley, Monmouthshire
- Church of St Mapley
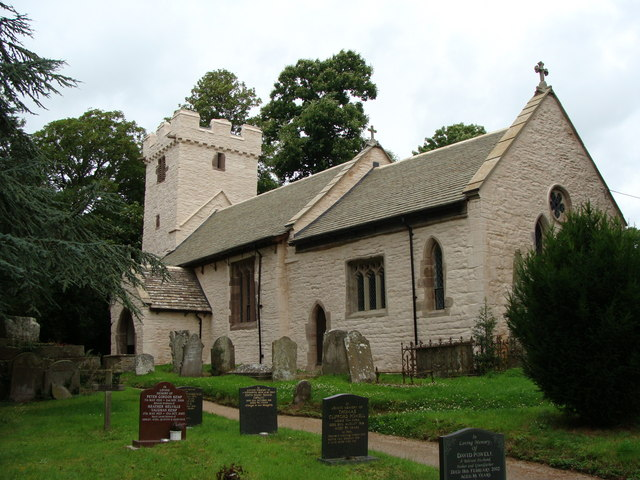

- Location in Monmouthshire
- Location: Llanvapley, Monmouthshire
- Country: Wales
- Denomination: Church in Wales

History
- Status: Parish church
- Founded: C.15th century

Architecture
- Functional status: Active
- Heritage designation: Grade II*
- Designated: 9 January 1956
- Architectural type: Church

Administration
- Diocese: Monmouth
- Archdeaconry: Monmouth
- Deanery: Abergavenny
- Parish: Llanvapley

The Church of St Mapley, Llanvapley, Monmouthshire is a parish church with its origins in the 15th century. Dedicated to St Mable, variants of the dedication include St Mapley, St Mabli and St Mafli. The church is a Grade II* listed building.

== History ==
The church dates from the 15th century, and was restored in 1861 and 1950. The chancel and tower arches may be earlier, from the 13th or 14th centuries. The Monmouthshire antiquarian Joseph Bradney recorded that two of the bells dated from 1626.

== Architecture and description ==
The church is built of Old Red Sandstone and the style is Early English. The tower has a corbelled parapet.
