= Vaughan Rees =

Welsh priest (1879–1948)

Vaughan William Treharne Rees (1879-1948) was a Welsh Anglican priest, most notably the first * Archdeacon of Newport.

Rees was educated at Llandovery College and St David's College, Lampeter. He was ordained deacon and priest in 1904. After curacies in Mountain Ash, Canton, Cardiff an St. Andrews Major he held incumbencies at Llanarth and Trevethin.
