= Gilbert Joyce =

British bishop (1866–1942)

The Right Reverend Gilbert Cunningham Joyce
- Bishop of Monmouth
- Church: Church in Wales
- Predecessor: Charles Green
- Successor: Alfred Monahan

Orders
- Ordination: 1892 by Richard Lewis

Personal details
- Born: 7 April 1866
- Died: 22 July 1942 (aged 76)

Gilbert Cunningham Joyce (7 April 1866 – 22 July 1942) was a university educator and Bishop of Monmouth.

He was educated at Harrow School, and Brasenose College, Oxford. He took his BA in 1888, MA in 1892, BD in 1904, and DD in 1909.

After studying briefly in Germany he was ordained deacon in 1892 by Bishop Lewis of Llandaff, and was sub-warden of St Michael's College, Aberdare, from 1892 to 1896, receiving priest's orders in 1893. From 1897 to 1916 he was Warden of St Deiniol's Library, Hawarden, and in 1916, he was made principal of St David's College, now the University of Wales, Lampeter. The college at Lampeter was founded in 1822 as a theological college, but had, by 1916, liberalised its admissions policy and curriculum. Joyce, due to his own background in the clergy, wanted the college to return to its theological roots. He advocated an abandonment of the college charter which allowed it to award Bachelor of Arts degrees, but the college board voted down the proposals. As a result, Joyce resigned from his post as principal.

After his departure from Lampeter in 1923, Joyce became in 1927 Archdeacon of St David's, and then succeeded Charles Green as Bishop of Monmouth on 30 November 1928.

Joyce took a leading part in the life of the Church in Wales, and his counsel was also eagerly sought in educational movements. He was Pro-Chancellor of the University of Wales (which conferred on him the honorary degree of LL.D. in 1937) from 1934 to 1941, and President of the Welsh National School of Medicine from 1931 to 1937.

Academic offices
Preceded by Llewellyn John Montfort Bebb	Principal of St David's College; 1916–1923	Succeeded by Maurice Jones
Church in Wales titles
Preceded by Charles Alfred Howell Green	Bishop of Monmouth; 1928–1940	Succeeded by Alfred Edwin Monahan
