= Thomas Parry Pryce =

Welsh Anglican priest (died 1953)

Thomas Parry-Pryce was a Welsh Anglican priest, most notably the second Archdeacon of Newport.

Parry-Pryce was educated at St David's College, Lampeter and ordained deacon and priest in 1906. After a curacy at Blaenavon he held incumbencies at Dingestow, Aberystruth and Pontypridd. He was Vicar of St Paul, Newport from 1933 to 1948; Rural Dean of Newport from 1948 to 1949; and its archdeacon from 1949 until his death on 15 January 1953, during which time he was also Vicar of St Mellons.
