= Barrie Evans (priest) =

Welsh Anglican priest (1923–2009)

(John) Barrie Evans (1923-2009) was a senior Welsh Anglican priest.

Evans was educated at St David's College, Lampeter, St Edmund Hall, Oxford and St Michael's College, Llandaff. He was ordained deacon in 1951 and priest in 1952. After a curacy in Trevethin he held incumbencies at Caerwent then Chepstow. Tyte was Archdeacon of Monmouth from 1977 to 1986; and Archdeacon of Newport from 1986 to 1993.
