= St Madoc's Church, Llanbadoc =

St Madoc's Church, Llanbadoc, Monmouthshire
- Church of St Madoc
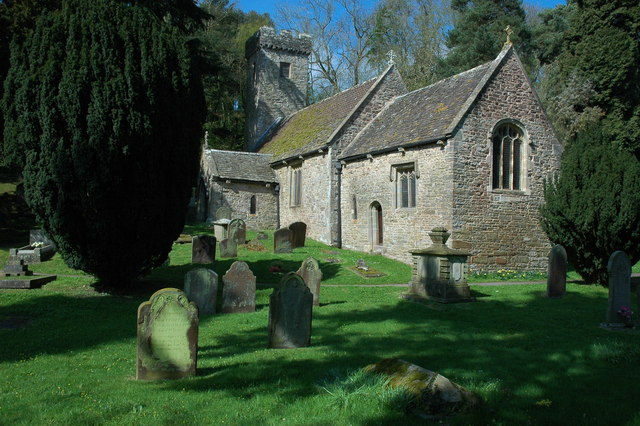
- Llanbadoc Church where Alfred Russel Wallace was baptized

- Location in Monmouthshire
- 51.6959°N 2.9042°W
- Location: Llanbadoc, Monmouthshire
- Country: Wales
- Denomination: Church in Wales

History
- Status: Parish church
- Founded: C14th century

Architecture
- Functional status: Active
- Heritage designation: Grade II*
- Designated: 18 November 1980
- Architectural type: Church

Administration
- Diocese: Monmouth
- Archdeaconry: Monmouth
- Deanery: Raglan/Usk
- Parish: Llanbadoc

Clergy
- Vicar: The Reverend K J Hasler

The Church of St Madoc, Llanbadoc, Monmouthshire is a parish church with its origins in the 14th century. A Grade II* listed building, the church remains an active parish church.

== History ==
The church is thought to have belonged to Usk Priory in the 12th century, but no part of the church can be dated to before 1300. The earliest datable element is the reredos, although the nave and chancel may be contemporary with it. The tower and the main window in the nave are 15th century. The roof of the nave appears to have been rebuilt in the early 18th century, probably as a result of damage suffered in the Great Storm of 1703. In the 19th century, the church was extensively restored by John Prichard who was responsible for the almost complete rebuilding of the interior.

The Monmouthshire author and artist Fred Hando recorded that the two bells in the tower dated from 1635 and 1677. The naturalist Alfred Russel Wallace was baptized at the church in 1823.

== Architecture and description ==
The architectural historian John Newman records the style of the church as Decorated.
