= Conybeare Bruce =

Welsh Anglican priest

(William) Conybeare Bruce (2 December 1844 – 12 February 1919) was a Welsh Anglican priest, most notably Archdeacon of Monmouth during the late 19th and early 20th centuries.

Bruce was born in St. Nicholas, Vale of Glamorgan, into the Welsh branch of Clan Bruce related to Robert Bruce, Lord Kennet, of Clackmannanshire. He was the eldest son of Rev. William Bruce, younger brother of Henry Bruce, 1st Baron Aberdare, and Mary Elizabeth Conybeare, daughter of Rev. William Conybeare.

He was educated at University College, Oxford. He was ordained deacon in 1866 and priest in 1867. He served curacies at Itchenstoke, Alverstoke and Brompton; and held livings at St Nicholas (1862–1872) and Newport (1882–1919). He was Archdeacon of Monmouth from 1885 to 1914. He died at Rogiet.
