= Tabernacle Chapel, Llandovery =

Church in Carmarthenshire, Wales

Coordinates: 51°59′40″N 3°47′41″W

- Tabernacle Chapel, Llandovery
- Location: Queen Street, Llandovery
- Country: Wales
- Denomination: Calvinistic Methodist

History
- Founded: 1836

Architecture
- Heritage designation: Grade II*
- Designated: 26 February 1981
- Architectural type: Chapel
- Style: Gothic

Tabernacle Chapel is a Calvinistic Methodist chapel in the town of Llandovery, Carmarthenshire, Wales. The present building dates from 1836 and is located in Queen Street, Llandovery. It was designated as a Grade II* listed building on 26 February 1981.

Tabernacle Calvinistic Methodist Chapel was built in 1836, refurbished in 1869 and renovated in 1906. It is set back from the road and fronted by a courtyard. The facade has a raised plinth with four bays and large Gothic windows with classical details, the whole being on a rather larger scale than most Welsh chapels. There are four large pointed widows, the ones in the central bays being taller, and two doors. The walls are painted stucco and the roof is gabled with deep eaves, and Greek Revival mutules under the eaves, similar to those found at Llandingat House. The interior of the chapel has a five-sided gallery with simple panels supported by six iron posts. The pulpit dates from 1869 and is set on a painted platform with a panelled base, curved corners and a balustrade, in a wide arched recess.

This chapel was designated as a Grade II* listed building on 26 February 1981, being a fine example of "a large town chapel in Georgian Gothic style with good interior detail including gallery of 1869". The Royal Commission on the Ancient and Historical Monuments of Wales curates the archaeological, architectural and historic records for this chapel. These include digital photographs, a collection of old postcards, a Victorian Society South Wales Group Tour Guide and various items from the Rosser collection.
