= Charles Lewis (priest) =

Welsh Anglican priest (died 1964)

Charles Gerwyn Rice Lewis was a Welsh Anglican priest, most notably the third Archdeacon of Newport.

Lewis served with the Royal Flying Corps during World War I. was educated at St David's College, Lampeter and ordained deacon in 1923 and priest in 1924. After curacies in Canton, Pwllgwaun and St Woolos, Newport he held incumbencies at Treherbert and All saints' Newport. Lewis was a Chaplain to the Forces during World War II. He was Archdeacon of Newport from 1953 archdeacon from 1949 until his death on 17 July 1964, during which time he was also Vicar of St Mellons.
