= Edwin Morris (bishop) =

English Anglican bishop

The Right Reverend Edwin Morris
- Archbishop of Wales
- Church: Church in Wales
- Archdiocese: Wales
- Diocese: Diocese of Monmouth
- In office: 1957 to 1967
- Predecessor: John Morgan
- Successor: Glyn Simon
- Other post: Bishop of Monmouth (1945 to 1967)

Orders
- Ordination: 1924 (deacon); 1925 (priest)
- Consecration: 1945

Personal details
- Born: Alfred Edwin Morris; 8 May 1894
- Died: 19 October 1971 (aged 77)
- Denomination: Anglicanism
- Education: St John's College, Oxford

Alfred Edwin Morris (8 May 1894 – 19 October 1971) was an English Anglican bishop, who served as the Bishop of Monmouth and Archbishop of Wales in the middle of the 20th century.

== Early life and education ==
Morris was born on 8 May 1894 in Lye, Worcestershire, England. During the First World War, he served in France with the Royal Army Medical Corps and was attached to the 9th (Scottish) Division.

He studied theology at St David's College Lampeter, graduating with a first class Bachelor of Arts (BA) degree in 1922. He then matriculated into St John's College, Oxford, having received an Exhibition to study for a second BA in theology. He was awarded the Junior Septuagint Prize in 1923, and the Junior Greek Testament Prize in 1924. He graduated with first class honours from the University of Oxford in 1924. During his ordained ministry, he was awarded a Bachelor of Divinity (BD) degree by Lampeter and the Lambeth Doctor of Divinity (DD) degree in 1950.

== Ordained ministry ==
Morris was ordained in the Church in Wales as a deacon in 1924 and as a priest in 1925, both times by John Owen during services at St David's Cathedral. In 1924, he was appointed Professor of Hebrew and Theology at St David's College, Lampeter, holding the post until his elevation to the episcopate. He was an examining chaplain to the Bishop of Bangor (1925–1928) and to the Bishop of Llandaff (1931–1934). He never served as a parish priest.

In 1945, Morris was elected Bishop of Monmouth, the diocesan bishop of the Diocese of Monmouth. He was additionally Archbishop of Wales, the head of the Church in Wales, from 1957 to 1967: He was the first Englishman to be head of the disestablished church. (Note: I was the first Englishman to become archbishop of Wales and probably I shall also be the last.)

He was a noted author and also served as Sub-Prelate of the Order of St John of Jerusalem. He retired in 1967, and died four years later on 19 October 1971 at his house in Lampeter, Ceredigion, Wales. His papers are held at the Roderic Bowen Library.

In 1925, Morris married Emily Louisa Davis. Together they had five children: one daughter and four sons. His wife predeceased him, dying in 1968.

=== Views ===
A staunch defender of the Church in Wales, Morris attracted controversy when he said that "The Church in Wales is the Catholic Church in this land" and referred to Roman Catholic and Nonconformist clergy as being "strictly speaking, intruders" whose rights to function in Wales could not be acknowledged. He also campaigned against the retention of the word "Protestant" in the Coronation Oath, entering into detailed correspondence with the then Archbishop of Canterbury, Geoffrey Fisher, on the issue. He was unsuccessful, and Fisher even questioned whether such matters were really the business of a prelate who was "not a bishop of the Church of England".

Nonetheless, Fisher (who had by then retired) and Morris were later among those senior clergy who objected to the proposed Anglican-Methodist reunion which was being mooted during the late 1960s and early 1970s. They remained on friendly terms, with Fisher even saying that the new flurries of correspondence between them was "quite like old times". For all his claims of a Tractarian position however, Morris did not, it appears, always endear himself to those clergy who took a more Anglo-Catholic stance. He prohibited extra-eucharistic devotions to the Sacrament (such as Benediction) in his diocese and insisted that permission be sought before the Sacrament was reserved in a tabernacle or aumbry for use in giving Holy Communion to the sick.

Although the basis for his faith and doctrine was undoubtedly the 1662 Book of Common Prayer, he oversaw as Archbishop of Wales the preparation of a new Order for the Celebration of the Holy Eucharist for use in the Church in Wales. When, in 1966 this replaced the 1662 rite he commended it unreservedly, saying that the new rite brought "priest and people more effectively than does the Prayer Book service". The John Piper east window and mural at St Woolos' (Gwynllyw) Cathedral in Newport, Wales, were commissioned and installed during his episcopate.

== Selected works ==
Amongst others he wrote:

- The Church in Wales and Nonconformity (1949)
- The problem of life and death (1950)
- The Catholicity of the Book of Common Prayer (1952)
- The Christian use of alcoholic beverages (1960)
- The Lambeth Quadrilateral and reunion (1969)

== Notes ==
Church in Wales titles
Preceded by Alfred Monahan	Bishop of Monmouth; 1945–1967	Succeeded by Eryl Thomas
Preceded by John Morgan	Archbishop of Wales; 1957–1967	Succeeded by Glyn Simon
