= Glyn Simon =

Welsh bishop (1903–1972)

William Glyn Hughes Simon (14 April 1903 – 14 June 1972) was a Welsh prelate who served as the Anglican Archbishop of Wales from 1968 to 1971.

== Early life ==
Simon was born in Swansea, where his father was curate at St Gabriel's church. He was baptised by David Lewis Prosser, later to become the third Archbishop of Wales.

Educated from 1913 at Christ College, Brecon, Simon went to Jesus College, Oxford in 1922 where he studied Greats. He trained for the priesthood at St Stephen's House, Oxford, and was ordained deacon at Chester Cathedral in 1928, being appointed to the parish of St Paul's Crewe.

== Career ==
In 1931 Simon became warden of the Church Hostel at Bangor; the poet R. S. Thomas was a resident student there in 1932, and touchingly, would go on addressing Simon as "Dear Warden" in letters to him even when he was Archbishop. In 1939 he was appointed warden of St Michael's College, Llandaff, and in 1941 he married, which some colleagues felt improved his interpersonal skills.

In 1948 he became Dean of Llandaff, a position which carries with it the role of vicar of (the parish of) Llandaff, since Llandaff Cathedral doubles as a parish church. As Dean, Simon was largely responsible for the reconstruction of the war-damaged nave of the cathedral, commissioning Epstein's Majestas or statue of Christ in Majesty. With Archbishop John Morgan he strongly but unsuccessfully opposed the building of a technical college marring the view of the cathedral.

Becoming Bishop of Swansea and Brecon in 1953, Simon developed a sympathy for the Welsh language and for the architecture of the Welsh countryside. Translated to Llandaff in 1957, he represented a moderate form of Anglo-Catholicism, notably on one occasion refusing to join in an ovation for a priest who had done a great deal to foster devotion in the Church in Wales to the Virgin Mary. As well as overseeing the development of a number of new churches, he also created an industrial chaplaincy at the Port Talbot steelworks.

Elected Archbishop of Wales in 1968, he held the post only until 1971, when he retired, suffering from Parkinson's disease. He resigned as Archbishop in June of that year, while remaining in post as Bishop of Llandaff until August thus permitting his participation in the election of the new archbishop - but as the illness made certain tasks, such as handwriting, difficult, he decided to retire altogether.

== Criticism ==
Simon's public interventions include his vigorous stance at the time of the Aberfan disaster (1966). His interview with the BBC reporter Vincent Kane was notable as was his visit to the imprisoned language campaigner Dafydd Iwan (1970). Another television debate engaged Simon in eirenic debate with Sir Bernard Lovell of the Jodrell Bank Observatory. Key issues which engaged his attention included apartheid (there was a notable altercation with the Glamorgan captain Wilf Wooller over a visiting South African cricket team) and nuclear disarmament.

Simon's remarks concerning the way bishops were elected in the Church in Wales earned him criticism from Carl Witton-Davies and a satire in the Western Mail in 1961 by the writer and broadcaster Aneirin Talfan Davies. Relations became tense with the then archbishop, the English-born Edwin Morris, whose suitability to fill the Archbishopric Simon had questioned on the grounds that Morris was a monoglot English speaker and could not communicate in Welsh. At an earlier date Simon had criticised the ceremonial attached to the Gorsedd of Bards, remarking that the robes of the Archdruid seemed to be approximating those worn by the Archbishop.

Pastorally Simon had excellent communication skills with children but was somewhat less at ease with adolescents. His forthright expression commended itself however to university students and gained him considerable popularity (see Rowan Williams in "Sources").

== Personal life ==
Simon accepted several public positions, for periods holding the post of President of the Ecclesiological Society and that of the Cambrian Archaeological Association. Simon married Sheila Roberts, a native Welsh speaker, in 1941. They had four children, one of whom died young. One of his sons is the art historian and critic Robin Simon. Sheila died in 1963. Simon remarried in 1970 and retired to Goathurst, Somerset. He died in hospital at Taunton in 1972 aged 69.

== Works ==
- The Origins of the Church in Wales, and her History up to the Reformation (Welsh Church Congress),1953.
- Torch Commentary I Corinthians, 1959.
- Then and Now (primary visitation),1961.
- The Landmark,1962.
- Feeding the Flock, 1964.
- A Time of Change (second visitation),1966.
- transl. of J. Danielou, The Ministry of Women in the Early Church, 1961.
- ed. Bishops, 1961

Church in Wales titles
Preceded by Edward Williamson	Bishop of Swansea and Brecon; 1953–1957	Succeeded by Jack Thomas
Preceded by John Morgan	Bishop of Llandaff; 1957–1971	Succeeded by Eryl Thomas
Preceded by Edwin Morris	Archbishop of Wales; 1968–1971	Succeeded by Gwilym Williams
