= Daniel Davies (bishop) =

Daniel Davies (7 November 1863 – 23 August 1928) was the Anglican Bishop of Bangor from 1925 until his death.

Davies was educated at St John's College, Cambridge. He held curacies at Conway and Bangor before becoming Vicar Choral of St Asaph Cathedral and then the incumbent at Brymbo. He was chairman of the executive committee of the National Eisteddfod of Wales in 1912, by which time he was a residential canon at St Asaph Cathedral, a post he held until his ordination as a bishop.

Church in Wales titles
Preceded by Watkin Williams	Bishop of Bangor; 1925–1928	Succeeded by Charles Green
