= Keith Tyte =

British Anglican priest

Keith Arthur Edwin Tyte (1931-2002) was a senior Welsh Anglican priest. Tyte was educated at St David's College, Lampeter. After curacies in Mynyddislwyn and Llanfrechfa he was Vicar of Bettws from 1964 to 1971; Griffithstown from 1971 to 1977; Malpas from 1977 to 1987; and Llanmartin from 1987 to 1993. Tyte was Archdeacon of Monmouth from 1986 to 1993; and Archdeacon of Newport from 1993 to 1997.
