= Charles Green (bishop) =

Welsh Anglican bishop (1864–1944)

The Most Reverend Charles Green
- Archbishop of Wales
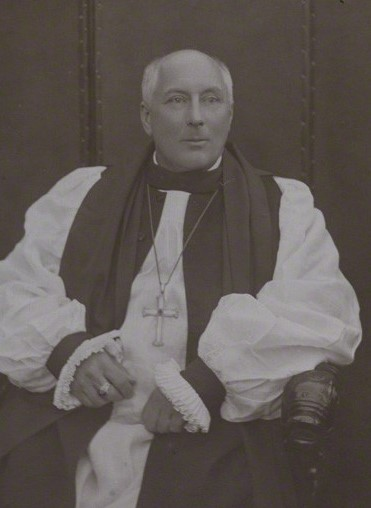
- Green, c. 1920s
- Church: Church in Wales
- In office: 1934–1944
- Predecessor: A. G. Edwards
- Successor: David Prosser
- Other posts: Bishop of Monmouth (1921–1928); Bishop of Bangor (1928–1944)

Orders
- Ordination: 1889

Personal details
- Born: 19 August 1864 Llanelli, Carmarthenshire, United Kingdom
- Died: 7 May 1944 (aged 79)
- Education: Keble College, Oxford

Charles Alfred Howell Green (19 August 1864 – 7 May 1944) was an Anglican bishop of the Church in Wales. He was the first Bishop of Monmouth (1921–1928) and subsequently Bishop of Bangor during which time he served as Archbishop of Wales.

== Biography ==
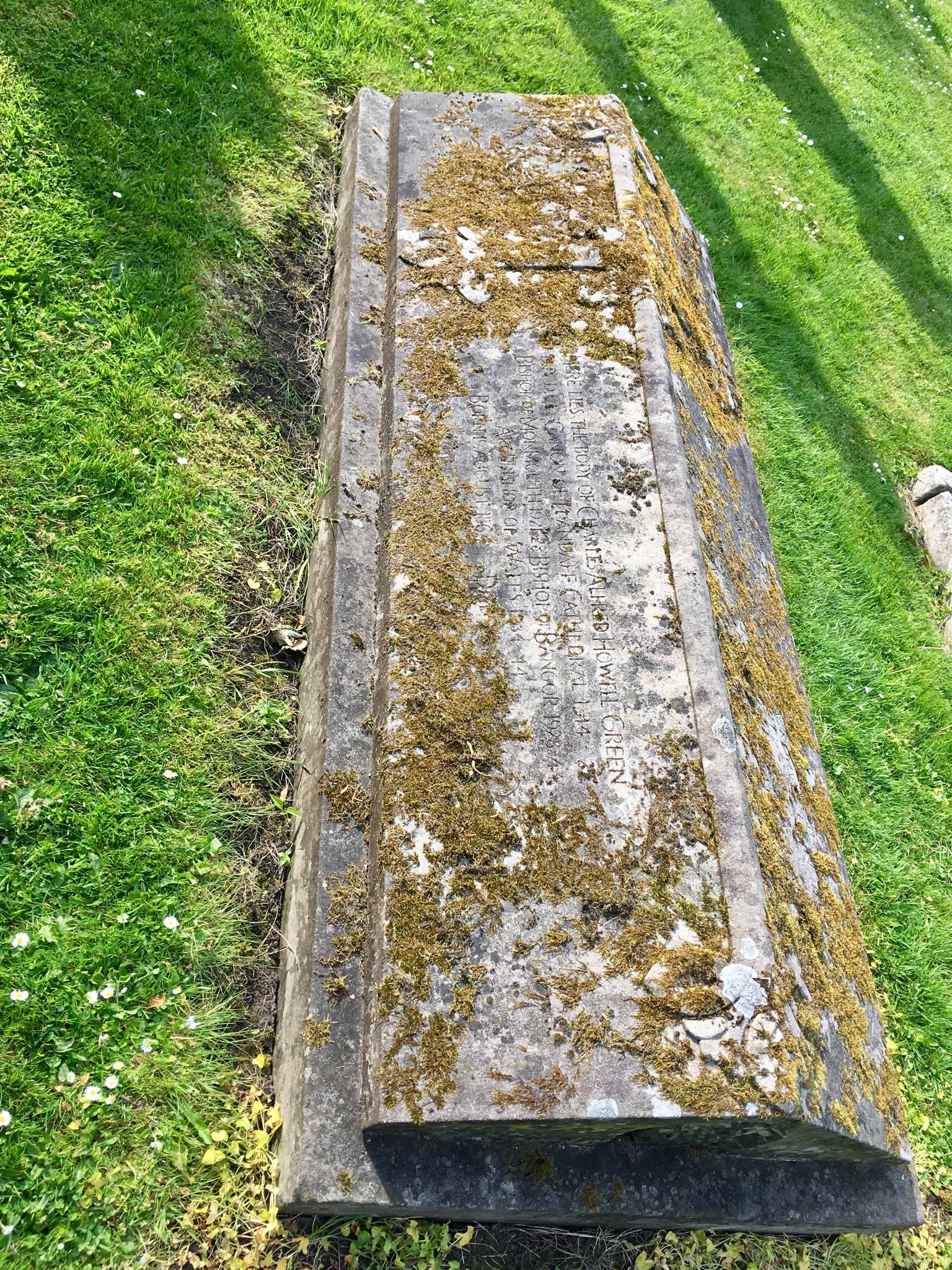
Green's grave in the churchyard of Llandaff Cathedral, May 2020

Green was born in Llanelli and was educated at Charterhouse School and Keble College, Oxford, where he was President of the Oxford Union in the Hilary term, 1887. He was ordained in 1889.

He began his ministry with a curacy at Aberdare and was subsequently Vicar then Rural Dean of the area. In 1914 he was appointed Archdeacon of Monmouth, a post he held until his elevation in 1921 as the first bishop of the newly established Diocese of Monmouth.

He was expert at organisation and realising that the population of Monmouthshire had changed since the church was created he founded thirteen new parishes. The new parishes reflected the growth of industry and formed principally a new archdeaconry in Newport. He also redistributed the rural areas and created six new deaneries as part of the Archdeaconry of Monmouth. These were Abergavenny, Chepstow, Monmouth, Netherwent, Raglan, and Usk. (The latter two were later merged to create the new deanery of Raglan and Usk.)

Green was subsequently Bishop of Bangor (25 Sept. 1928–1944) during which time he also served as Archbishop of Wales (1934–1944).

Cultured but with a reputation for authoritarianism, a representative of the High Church tradition, Green wrote a work on the church dedications of the Llandaff and Monmouth dioceses and the definitive guide to the constitution of the Church in Wales.

He died at Bishopscourt, Bangor, aged 79.

== Works ==
Green, Charles A.H. (1937). The Setting of the Constitution of the Church in Wales. London: Sweet and Maxwell.

Church in Wales titles
New title	Bishop of Monmouth; 1921–1928	Succeeded by Gilbert Joyce
Preceded by Daniel Davies	Bishop of Bangor; 1928–1944	Succeeded by David Edwardes Davies
Preceded by A. G. Edwards	Archbishop of Wales; 1934–1944	Succeeded by David Prosser
