= St Cadoc's =

St Cadoc's or St Cadocs or St Catwg's may refer to:

== Churches ==
- St Cadoc's Church, Caerleon, Newport
- St Cadoc's Church, Cheriton, Gower, Swansea
- St Catwg's Church, Cwmcarvan, Monmouthshire
- St Cadoc's Church, Glynneath, Neath Port Talbot
- St Catwg's Church, Gelligaer, Caerphilly
- St Cadoc's Church, Llancarfan, Vale of Glamorgan
- St Cadoc's Church, Llangattock-juxta-Usk, Monmouthshire
- St Cadoc's Church, Llangattock Lingoed, Monmouthshire
- St Cadoc's Church, Llangattock Vibon Avel, Monmouthshire
- St Cadoc's Church, Pendoylan, Vale of Glamorgan
- St Cadoc's Church, Penrhos, Monmouthshire
- St Cadoc's Church, Raglan, Monmouthshire

== Other uses ==
- St Cadoc's Hospital, in Caerleon, Newport, Wales
- St Cadocs/Penygarn, an electoral ward in the county borough of Torfaen, Wales
- St Cadoc's Y.C., a Scottish football club
- St Cadoc, Halfway, a parish in the Roman Catholic Diocese of Motherwell, Scotland

== See also ==
- Cadoc
