= St Tysoi's Church, Llansoy =

Church of St Tysoi, Llansoy
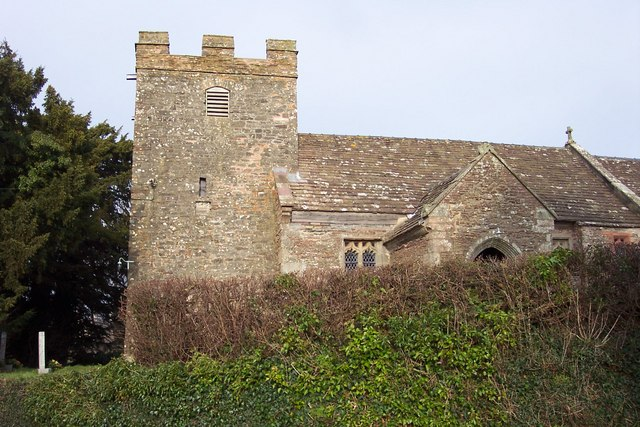
- Church of St Tysoi
- Church of St Tysoi, Llansoy
- 51.7175°N 2.8088°W
- Location: Monmouth, Monmouthshire
- Country: Wales
- Denomination: Church in Wales

History
- Status: Grade I listed

Architecture
- Style: Perdendicular
- Years built: 14th/15th century

Administration
- Diocese: Monmouth

The Church of St Tysoi, is the parish church of Llansoy, Monmouthshire, Wales and sits to the south of the village. It is in the Perpendicular style and is a Grade I listed building as of 19 August 1955.

== History and architecture ==
The church is medieval in origin, of Old Red Sandstone. The tower may be "no earlier than the early nineteenth century."* The church was lightly restored in the nineteenth century including work by John Pollard Seddon.

The interior has a fifteenth-century barrel roof and contemporary fittings. It also has some notable stained glass windows of the nineteen twenties and of the later twentieth century, including a "brilliantly coloured" "Genesis" window by Geoffrey Robinson.
