= Glyndwr Hackett =

(Ronald) Glyndwr Hackett (born 1947) is a Welsh Anglican priest.

Hackett was educated at Hatfield College, Durham and Ripon College, Cuddesdon. He was ordained in 1973 and served curacies in Pembroke and Bassaleg. Hackett held incumbencies in Blaenavon, Newport and Mamhilad. He was Archdeacon of Monmouth from 2001 to 2008; and Archdeacon of Newport from 2008 to 2012.
