= Ambrose Mason =

Thomas Henry Ambrose Mason (born 1951) is a retired Welsh Anglican priest: he was Archdeacon of Monmouth from 2013 until 2021.

== Career ==
A former solicitor, he trained at Oak Hill College and was ordained in 1987. He attended The King's School, Macclesfield. After a curacy in West Drayton he was Field Officer at Oak Hill. He was European Secretary of the Intercontinental Church Society from 1989 to 1994; and Director of Training for the Diocese of Europe from 1995 to 2003. He was Rector of Grosmont, Monmouthshire from 2003 to 2008; and then Director of Ministry for the Diocese of Monmouth until his appointment as archdeacon; he was collated on 24 November 2013. He retired effective 12 March 2021.
