= St Michael and All Angels, Mitchel Troy =

Church of St Michael and All Angels, Mitchel Troy
- Church of St Michael and All Angels
- Church of St Michael and All Angels, Mitchel Troy
- 51.789903°N 2.737625°W
- Location: Mitchel Troy, Monmouthshire
- Country: Wales
- Denomination: Church in Wales
- Website: monmouthparishes.org/churches/st-michaels

History
- Status: Grade II* listed

Architecture
- Architect: John Prichard

Administration
- Diocese: Monmouth

The Church of St Michael and All Angels, is a parish church in the village of Mitchel Troy, Monmouthshire, Wales. The Grade II* listed building stands in the centre of the village, on the north side of the old road from Monmouth to Raglan, 2.5 miles (4.0 km) south-west of Monmouth.

== History ==
The village of Mitchel Troy derives its name from the Welsh "Llanfihangel Troddi" which means "Church of St Michael by the Trothy". The River Trothy passes north of the church on its route towards Monmouth.

A plaque in the church dating from the Victorian restoration gives a foundation date for the church of 1208. However, little remains of this structure. The 18th century saw to collapse of a spire on the church tower which also severely damaged the main block of the church. The present building is mainly by John Prichard who undertook restoration between 1873 and 1876 with funding provided by the 8th Duke of Beaufort. The Beaufort family were patrons of the church throughout the 19th century.

== Architecture ==
=== Exterior ===
The church has a tower with a castellated stone belfry. In the south-west corner of the tower is a large quoin stone, inscribed Orate Peo Godfride et Johanne. Little is known of its origin but it is thought to be a foundation stone. Central to the south side of the nave is a porch of medieval date, surmounted by dormers with trefoil-headed lights. The churchyard is entered via a stone lych gate. The churchyard cross, of which only the column remains, is decorated with ball flowers which are echoed in the pulpit and reredos inside the church, and dates from the 15th century.

=== Interior ===
The generous patronage of the Beauforts led to Prichard creating a sumptuously-decorated interior. In the south aisle, there is a Norman font which was recovered from the rectory garden. On the other side is an elaborate marble font, designed by Prichard, decorated with fish and flowers. To the west of the doorway, a large inscription on the wall reads "To the Glory of God this church of St Michael and All Angels, built AD1208, was reconstructed Aug 4th AD 1876."

During the 19th century reconstruction, an ancient stone altar was discovered in the South aisle, with five consecration crosses representing the five wounds of Christ. The slab was remounted under the East window of the south aisle, serving as an altar for the Lady chapel. Also uncovered during the reconstruction was a stone which had been used as a piscina, but which was, in fact, the lid of a child's coffin. At the end of the north aisle is a reproduction of The Last Supper in marble.

The church has a number of decorated stone corbels. Above the nave they carry a portcullis, the Beaufort heraldic badge, and Saint George's Cross. On the organ chamber they depict an birds and flowers. On the south wall is an otter with a fish. The choir stalls originally had carved figures of angels with musical instruments, but these were stolen in 1995. Replacement finials depicting vegetation have been substituted. Stained glass windows within the church are dedicated to various vicars, members of the Beaufort family and others. The East window represents the Ascension. The tower has three bells with inscriptions commemorating church wardens of the 17th and 18th centuries.

The church is a Grade II* listed building.
