= Eryl Thomas =

Welsh bishop (1910–2001)

The Right Reverend Eryl Thomas
- Bishop of Llandaff
- Diocese: Diocese of Llandaff
- Elected: 4 October 1970
- In office: 1970–1975
- Predecessor: Glyn Simon
- Successor: John Poole-Hughes
- Other post: Bishop of Monmouth (1970–1975)

Orders
- Consecration: 29 March 1968

Personal details
- Born: Eryl Stephen Thomas; 20 October 1910 Llangadwaladr, Anglesey, Wales
- Died: 6 December 2001 (aged 91)
- Denomination: Anglicanism

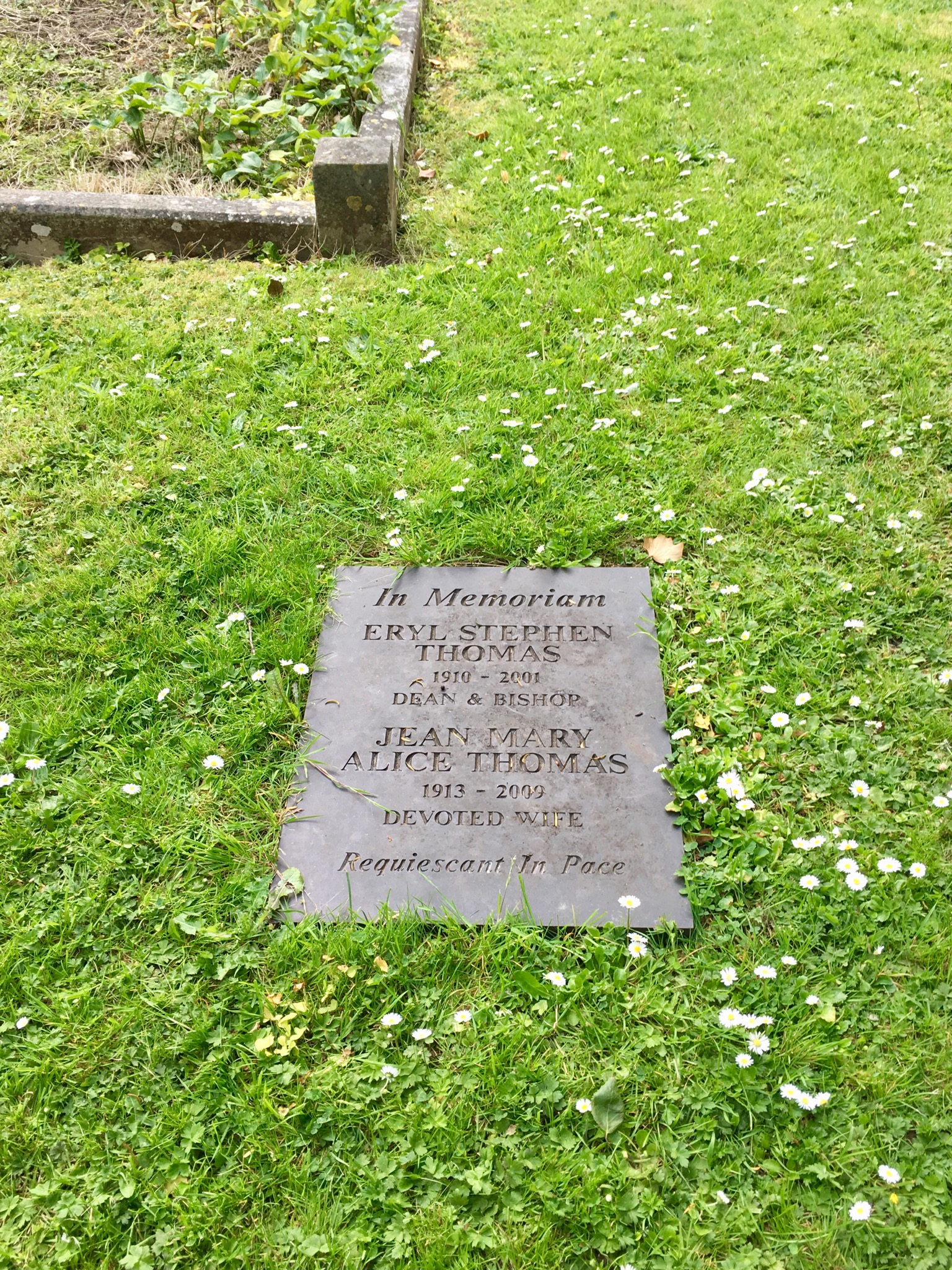
Gravemarker of Eryl and Jean Thomas in Llandaff Cathedral churchyard, May 2020.

Eryl Stephen Thomas (20 October 1910 – 6 December 2001) was a Welsh Anglican clergyman who served as Bishop of Monmouth and Bishop of Llandaff.

An Anglesey man, after education at St John's College, Oxford, Eryl Thomas served curacies in the Diocese of St Asaph before being appointed to a parish (Risca) in South Wales then as Warden of St Michael's College, Llandaff. He was appointed Dean of Llandaff in 1954, and in this post completed the restoration of the war-damaged cathedral begun under his predecessor Glyn Simon.

Stephen Thomas was in many ways a charismatic figure, he was renowned for his pastoral and preaching gifts, but he could also divide opinion. He vigorously exposed an important case of misuse of funds in the Church in Wales, incurring thereby some ill-will, and his opposition to the Sunday closing legislation applicable to Welsh public houses irritated Nonconformist abstainers. A prominent representative of the Anglo-Catholic school of theology, he seems however to have avoided the narrowness of outlook of some more conservative Christians and played an important role in Jewish-Christian dialogue in the Cardiff area.

There is some suggestion that Thomas was considered as a candidate for episcopal appointments during the 1950s, but was not in the event chosen to head a diocese until 1968 when he was elected and consecrated as Bishop of Monmouth. He was translated to Llandaff in 1970.

As bishop of Monmouth he was faced with the problem of redundant rural churches the existence of many of which derived from medieval manorial divisions. He argued unsuccessfully for standard modern Welsh orthography in parish names. He was critical of permissive developments in theatrical writing.

In 1975 Thomas was convicted of gross indecency which resulted in a fine, prior to which he felt obliged to resign, and he remained outside public ministry for a number of years. Although the content of the case might now be seen as indicating that Thomas was bisexual, he made no public statements concerning his orientation and remained married to and supported by his wife Jean, (with whom he had four children). His appointment as Assistant Bishop in the diocese of Swansea and Brecon from 1988 saw a return to pastoral and episcopal work in the remaining years of his life.

== Politics ==
Politically Thomas is known to have been on friendly terms with the then British Prime Minister Margaret Thatcher, and a letter, which is in the public domain refers to her gratitude for his encouragement "when times are difficult and criticism is so cruel". It is not clear to what extent his political leanings were towards the Conservative Party, but the content of the letter makes reference to a television interview with Thatcher in an edition of the Thames Television programme "TV Eye" which Thomas had seen. Although Thatcher invites Thomas to "Please write again" it is not known whether any further correspondence survives.

== Notes ==
Church in Wales titles
Preceded by Alfred Edwin Morris	Bishop of Monmouth; 1968–1970	Succeeded by Derrick Childs
Preceded by Glyn Simon	Bishop of Llandaff; 1970–1975	Succeeded by John Poole-Hughes
