= Sue Pinnington =

British Anglican priest (1966–2021)

Suzanne Jane Pinnington MBE (1966 – 24 July 2021) was a British Anglican priest. She served as Archdeacon of the Gwent Valleys in the Church in Wales Diocese of Monmouth from 2018 until her death in office.

Pinnington was educated at Trevelyan College, Durham and St Stephen's House, Oxford. She was ordained deacon in 1997, and priest in 1998. After a curacy in Oakham she was Rector of Houghton le Spring until her appointment as archdeacon. She was collated archdeacon on 7 July 2018.

Pinnington died on 24 July 2021.
