= Richard Pain =

British cleric (born 1956)

The Reverend Richard Pain
- Former Anglican Bishop of Monmouth
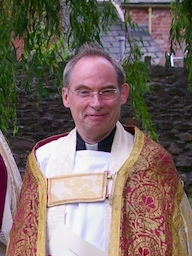
- Pain in 2009
- Church: Roman Catholic Church
- See: Personal Ordinariate of Our Lady of Walsingham
- Previous posts: Bishop of Monmouth (2013–2019; CiW); Archdeacon of Monmouth (2009–2013; CiW)

Orders
- Ordination: 1984 (Anglican deacon); 1985 (Anglican priest); 2024 (Catholic deacon and priest)
- Consecration: 2013 (Anglican bishop)

Personal details
- Born: Richard Edward Pain; 21 September 1956 (age 70)
- Denomination: Catholicism; Anglicanism (formerly)
- Children: 3
- Profession: Theologian
- Education: Bristol University; University of Wales, Cardiff

Ordination history
History
Diaconal ordination
- Ordained by: David Waller
Priestly ordination
- Ordained by: David Waller

Richard Edward Pain (born 21 September 1956) is a British Roman Catholic priest and former Anglican prelate who served as Bishop of Monmouth in the Church in Wales from 2013 to 2019. In June 2023, it was announced he would join the Catholic Church via the Personal Ordinariate of Our Lady of Walsingham. He was ordained a Catholic deacon and then as a Catholic priest in June 2024.

== Early life and education ==
Pain was born on 21 September 1956 in London, England. He studied English Literature at Bristol University, graduating with a Bachelor of Arts (BA) degree in 1979. In 1981, he entered St Michael's College, Llandaff to train for ordination. He also studied theology at University of Wales, Cardiff, and graduated with a Bachelor of Divinity (BD) degree in 1984.

== Ordained ministry ==
Pain was ordained in the Church in Wales as a deacon in 1984 and as a priest in 1985. He served his curacy at St Mary's Church, Caldicot, Monmouthshire, in the Diocese of Monmouth. Next, he was curate-in-charge and then vicar of Cwmtillery and Six Bells between 1986 and 1991. He then moved to Risca, where he was vicar of St Mary's Church from 1991 to 1998. From 1998 to 2008, he was vicar of Monmouth. He was additionally warden of ordinands from 2001 to 2006, and made an honorary canon of St Woolos' Cathedral, Newport in 2003. He served as Archdeacon of Monmouth from 2008 to 2013.

=== Episcopal ministry ===
He was elected Bishop of Monmouth on 23 July 2013. Having accepted the position, he was consecrated on 21 September at Llandaff Cathedral and enthroned at Newport Cathedral on 18 October. He was the 10th Bishop of Monmouth.

At the time of his election, Pain stated that he was in favour of the ordination of women as bishops.

In January 2019, the South Wales Argus revealed that Pain had not performed any of his episcopal duties since July 2018. He was undergoing a "formal process of mediation": this was due to a "personality clash between the bishop and some of his staff", rather than relating to a serious or criminal matter.

Pain retired on 30 April 2019, due to ill health.

== Roman Catholic Church ==
On 12 June 2023, it was announced that he would be received into the Catholic Church through the Personal Ordinariate of Our Lady of Walsingham. This took place during a service at the Church of St Basil and St Gwladys, Rogerstone, on 2 July 2023. He is the first Welsh Anglican bishop to be received into the Ordinariate since its creation in 2011.

Pain was ordained in the Ordinariate by Bishop David Waller as a Catholic deacon on 2 July and as a Catholic priest on 20 July 2024. He serves in the South East Wales Pastoral Area based at the Church of St Basil and St Gwladys, Rogerstone, Newport, Wales.

== Personal life ==
Pain is married. He and his wife have had three children together, one of whom died in 2008 from an accidental overdose of prescription drugs.

Church in Wales titles
Preceded by Dominic Walker	Bishop of Monmouth; 2013–2019	Succeeded by Cherry Vann
