= River Trothy =

River in Wales

Trothy
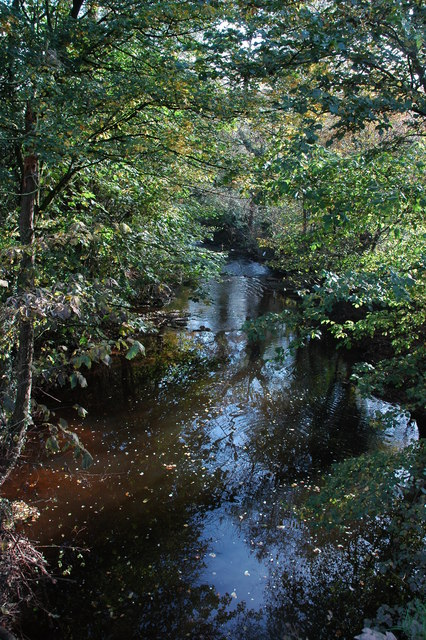
- The River Trothy near Monmouth
- Native name: Troddi (Welsh)

Location
- Country: Wales
- Region: Monmouthshire

Physical characteristics
- Source
  - location: Monmouthshire, Wales
- Mouth: River Wye
  - location: Monmouth, Wales
  - coordinates: 51°48′4.3″N 2°42′12.8″W

The River Trothy (Welsh: Afon Troddi) is a river which flows through north Monmouthshire, in rural south east Wales. It is a tributary of the River Wye.

The river rises on Campston Hill, northeast of Abergavenny. It flows southwards until Llanvapley, where it turns east. About 1/3 mile (0.54 km) south of Monmouth the river joins the confluence of the River Wye and the River Monnow.

== See also ==
- List of rivers of Wales
