= Llandingat House =

Townhouse in Llandovery, Wales

Coordinates: 51°59′34″N 3°47′55″W

Llandingat House is a late Georgian detached town house in the town of Llandovery, Carmarthenshire, Wales. The house was built in the early nineteenth century and is set back some way from the road, surrounded by its own grounds.

== History ==
The building dates from the early nineteenth century, probably 1813 to 1814; such substantial town houses are relatively rare in West Wales in that period. The house was built for David Lloyd Harries who had been an attorney in the town since 1808. In 1870, it passed into the hands of Lieutenant-Colonel Edward Pryse Lloyd, who changed his name to Lloyd-Harries when he came into his inheritance. In the 1890s, his brother Tudor Lloyd Harries became the owner, and since then the house has been let to Llandovery College as a boarding house.

== The house ==
The house is painted roughcast and has a hipped, slate roof with deep eaves, and Greek Revival mutules under the eaves, similar to those found at the nearby Tabernacle Chapel. Semi-circular stone steps lead up to the half-glazed door, the porch having two large Roman Doric columns.

This house was designated a Grade II-listed building on 26 February 1981, as an example of "a very substantial late Georgian detached town house with good surviving interior detail".
