= Bishop of Monmouth =

Diocesan bishop of the Church in Wales

- Bishopric
- Coat of arms
- Incumbent: Cherry Vann

Location
- Country: Cymru - Wales, United Kingdom
- Ecclesiastical province: Wales

Information
- First holder: Charles Green
- Denomination: Anglican
- Established: 1921
- Diocese: Monmouth
- Cathedral: Newport Cathedral
- Language: English and Welsh

Website
- Bishop of Monmouth

The Bishop of Monmouth (Welsh: Esgob Mynwy) is the diocesan bishop of the Church in Wales Diocese of Monmouth.

The episcopal see covers the historic county of Monmouthshire with the bishop's seat located at Newport Cathedral (commonly known as St Woolos' Cathedral) in the city of Newport. The former Church of St Woolos, which had existed in Newport since the sixth or seventh century AD, was originally the temporary seat of the Bishop when the Diocese of Monmouth was created in 1921. St Woolos was eventually raised to Cathedral status in 1949.

The bishop's residence is Bishopstow, which is in central Newport.

The diocese is one of two new ones founded in the 1920s when the Church in Wales was 'disestablished' and became independent of the established Church of England. The current Bishop is Cherry Vann, elected in 2019 as the first female Bishop of the Diocese. Her immediate predecessors were Richard Pain, previously Archdeacon of Monmouth, and Dominic Walker OGS, previously area Bishop of Reading in the Church of England.

The Diocese of Monmouth has also produced a number of Archbishops of Wales, including the current archbishop, Cherry Vann. Most notable among her predecessors was Rowan Williams, who was subsequently appointed Archbishop of Canterbury in 2002 — believed to be the first Welsh-born bishop to hold that post since the English Reformation in the 16th century. He was also the Archbishop of Wales at the time of his appointment to Canterbury and was styled as "Rowan Williams, Archbishop of Wales and Bishop of Monmouth".

== List of bishops ==
Bishops of Monmouth
| From | Until | Incumbent | Notes |
|---|---|---|---|
| 1921 | 1928 | Charles Green | Consecrated on 21 December 1921; translated to Bangor on 25 September 1928. |
| 1928 | 1940 | Gilbert Joyce | Previously Archdeacon of St David's; consecrated bishop on 30 November 1928; resigned in April 1940; died on 22 July 1942. |
| 1940 | 1945 | Alfred Monahan | Previously Archdeacon of Monmouth; consecrated bishop on 24 August 1940; died in office on 10 August 1945. |
| 1945 | 1967 | Edwin Morris | Consecrated bishop on 1 November 1945; also was Archbishop of Wales 1957–1967; resigned on 31 December 1967. |
| 1968 | 1971 | Eryl Thomas | Previously Dean of Llandaff; elected bishop on 14 February and consecrated on 29 March 1968; translated to Llandaff on 11 December 1971. |
| 1971 | 1986 | Derrick Childs | Previously Principal of Trinity College, Carmarthen; elected bishop on 25 January and consecrated on 23 May 1971; also was Archbishop of Wales 1983–1986; retired in the summer of 1986; died as result of a motor accident in 1987. |
| 1986 | 1991 | Clifford Wright | Previously Archdeacon of Newport; elected and consecrated bishop in 1986; retired in 1991. |
| 1991 | 2002 | Rowan Williams | Previously Lady Margaret Professor of Divinity at Oxford and canon of Christ Church; elected bishop on 5 December 1991 and consecrated on 1 May 1992; also was Archbishop of Wales 1999–2002; translated to Canterbury in 2002; master of Magdalene College, Cambridge 2013. |
| 2003 | 2013 | Dominic Walker OGS | Previously Area Bishop of Reading; elected bishop in December 2002 and enthroned on 30 March 2003. |
| 2013 | 2019 | Richard Pain | Previously Archdeacon of Monmouth; elected bishop on 23 July 2013 and enthroned on 19 October 2013. |
| 5 January 2020 | present | Cherry Vann | previously Archdeacon of Rochdale; also Archbishop of Wales since July 2025 |
