= Kenneth Sharpe =

Welsh Anglican priest (born 1940)

Kenneth William Sharpe (b 1940) was a senior Welsh Anglican priest, most notably Archdeacon of Newport from 1997 to 2008.

Sharpe was educated at St David's College, Lampeter and Sarum Theological College. He was ordained deacon in 1963 and priest in 1964. After a curacy in Hubberston he was Team Vicar of Cwmbran from 1971 to 1974. and of Dingestow from 1974 to 1982. He was also the Youth Chaplain for the Diocese of Monmouth from 1974 to 1982. Sharpe was Vicar of St Mark, Newport from 1982 to 1997.
