= Mitchel Troy =

Mitchel Troy: Welsh: Llanfihangel Troddi
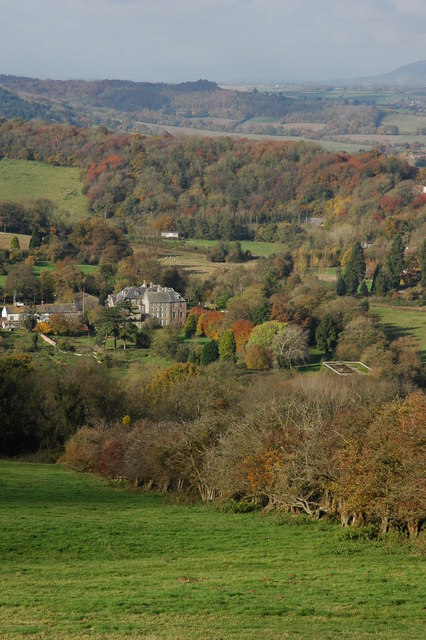
- View looking north-west over Troy House, Mitchel Troy

- Location within Monmouthshire
- Population: 1,253 (2011)
- OS grid reference: SO493103
- Community: Mitchel Troy
- Principal area: Monmouthshire
- Preserved county: Gwent
- Country: Wales
- Sovereign state: United Kingdom
- Post town: USK
- Postcode district: NP15
- Post town: MONMOUTH
- Postcode district: NP25
- Dialling code: 01600
- Police: Gwent
- Fire: South Wales
- Ambulance: Welsh
- UK Parliament: Monmouth
- List of places UK Wales Monmouthshire 51.78905°N 2.73646°W Map of the community

Mitchel Troy (Welsh: Llanfihangel Troddi, that is "church of St Michael on the River Trothy") is a village and community in Monmouthshire, south east Wales, in the United Kingdom. It is located 3 miles south west of the county town of Monmouth, just off the A40 road leading towards Raglan. Settlements within the community include Tregare, Dingestow, Cwmcarvan and Wonastow.

== History and amenities ==
The English name of the parish derives from the name of the river, the Welsh Troddi becoming Trothy and then Troy. The addition "Mitchel" is thought not to derive from the church's dedication to St Michael, but rather as a variant of the word "much" or "mickle", as also found at Mitcheldean in Gloucestershire, and used to differentiate the village from the nearby manor of Troy Parva.

John de Troye, Lord Chancellor of Ireland (died 1371), was born here early in the fourteenth century. Nathaniel Armstrong Wells, author, eldest son of the first black High Sheriff of Monmouthshire Nathaniel Wells, was christened here on 24 March 1806.

=== Church of St Michael and All Angels ===
The church of St Michael and All Angels dates back to the 13th century though the church was thoroughly restored in the 1870s in the Decorated style. The cleric and writer Adam of Usk was the rector in 1382–85; and the final resident incumbent of Mitchel Troy with Cwmcarvan, Arthur Walter Sneyd (1900–1980), who retired in 1971, is of note because he succeeded in taking both his Bachelor of Arts and Master of Arts degrees at Jesus College, Oxford within two years of retiring. Following Sneyd's departure, the parish became served from Overmonnow and more recently it has been incorporated into the Monmouth group of parishes.

=== Troy House ===
Troy House, about 1½ miles north east of the church, was largely rebuilt after about 1680, on the site of an earlier building, for the Duke of Beaufort, after the family seat at Raglan Castle had fallen into ruin. The house remained in the Somerset family until it was sold in 1901, after which it became a convent school and later, from 1935, an approved school. In 2008, proposals have been made for its conversion into residential apartments.

== Governance ==
Mitchel Troy is also the name of the electoral division, coterminous with the community. The division elects a county councillor to Monmouthshire County Council.
