= Clifford Wright (bishop) =

Welsh Anglican bishop (1922–2014)

The Right Reverend Clifford Wright
- Bishop of Monmouth
- Diocese: Diocese of Monmouth
- In office: 1986–1991
- Predecessor: Derrick Childs
- Successor: Rowan Williams
- Other post: Archdeacon of Newport (1977–1986)

Orders
- Ordination: 1946
- Consecration: 1986

Personal details
- Born: July 4, 1922
- Died: February 14, 2014 (aged 91) Newport, Wales
- Denomination: Anglicanism
- Education: University of Wales

Royston Clifford Wright (4 July 1922 – 14 February 2014) was the Anglican Bishop of Monmouth from 1986 to 1991.

== Church roles ==
Wright was educated at the University of Wales, Cardiff, studied for ordination at St Stephen's House in Oxford and was ordained in 1946. He held curacies in Bedwas, Newport and Walton-on-the-Hill, Liverpool, before 17 years as a naval chaplain. In 1968 he became vicar of Blaenavon and then rector of a team ministry in Ebbw Vale from 1974 to 1977. Further appointments as Rural Dean of Pontypool, and Archdeacon of Monmouth followed, after which he became the Archdeacon of Newport. Elected to become the Bishop of Monmouth in 1986, he held the bishopric until 1991.

== Views ==
A traditionalist in his theology and an opponent of the ordination of women to the priesthood and episcopate, he nonetheless served as an assistant bishop to his successors, Rowan Williams and Dominic Walker, (both of whom supported women's ordination) and did not take a prominent role in the discussions of the issue in retirement.

Although some sources have described him as authoritarian in his approach to administering a diocese, Wright was also known to inject humour into a situation. When a priest of his diocese acquired a phone-answering machine and left on it a message saying "Father has gone to say Mass, he does sometimes". The cleric was somewhat dumbfounded on his return to find a message from his superior saying: "This is Bishop Wright, who is pleased to hear it, could you ring me back please"?

== Death ==
Following his death in 2014, the Archbishop of Wales, Barry Morgan, said: “Bishop Clifford had a pastoral heart and a good sense of humour. He was also a very able administrator, managing the diocese well and overseeing the purchase of the diocesan office and resources centre. He affirmed the work of Sunday Schools while the value of Church day-schools was asserted by the opening of two voluntary-aided schools." The present Bishop of Monmouth, Richard Pain, who had served as a curate and incumbent under Wright, added that his predecessor had "a great love for the Diocese and his wise counsel was appreciated across the Province of Wales.”.

Church in Wales titles
Preceded by Derrick Greenslade Childs	Bishop of Monmouth; 1986–1991	Succeeded by Rowan Williams
