= David Griffiths (archdeacon of Monmouth) =

David Henry Griffiths (1864-1926) was a Welsh Anglican priest, most notably Archdeacon of Monmouth from 1921 until his death.

Griffiths was educated at Christ College, Brecon and Corpus Christi College, Cambridge. He was ordained deacon in 1888; and priest in 1889. After curacies in Ebbw Vale and Cardiff he was Vicar of Aberavon from 1901 to 1908; and of St Woolos, Newport from 1908. He was Rural Dean of Newport from 1915 to 1922; and Grand Chaplain of the Grand Lodge of England from 1924 until his death.
