= Alfred Monahan =

The Right Reverend Alfred Monahan
- Bishop of Monmouth
- Church: Church in Wales
- Predecessor: Gilbert Joyce
- Successor: Alfred Morris
- Other posts: Vicar of Monmouth (1912–1930); Archdeacon of Monmouth (1930–1940)

Orders
- Ordination: 1940

Personal details
- Born: 1877
- Died: 1945 (aged 67–68)
- Buried: Monmouth Cemetery

Alfred Edwin Monahan (1877–1945) was the Anglican Bishop of Monmouth from 1940 until his death in 1945.

== Biography ==
Monahan was educated at St Andrew's College, Dublin, and Trinity College Dublin and ordained in 1905. He was Assistant Missioner at the Wellington College Mission, Walworth, and then Curate of St Swithun and Old St Martin, Worcester. He was then successively the Vicar (1912–1930), Archdeacon ( 1930–1940) and finally Bishop of Monmouth (1940–1945). Monahan has been described as "a firm churchman of authoritarian personality who attracted and repelled according to taste, but he was a strong and effective teacher, preacher and spiritual director". He based his compilation The Churchpeople's Prayer Book on the 1928 Prayer Book. Monahan adopted the principle of reservation of the blessed sacrament in church and allowed devotional services of Benediction, which his immediate successor would later forbid.

Despite his Anglo-Catholic churchmanship, however, Dr. Monahan's episcopate was notable for his deposing, in 1942, the extreme priest Edmund Loftus MacNachten, vicar of St Thomas, Overmonnow, who had adopted such Roman Catholic practices as processions of the Blessed Sacrament and who, according to records, had also absented himself from his parish without making provision for services to be taken. During Dr Monahan's time in the diocese many clergy who had trained at St Stephen's House, Oxford were recruited to the diocese, and for all the furore caused by the proceedings against MacNachten, the character of Monmouth became considerably more "High Church" under his leadership. Records which came to light after his death show that Monahan had wished to appoint the Warden of Pusey House, Oxford, Canon Frederic Hood, as Dean of Monmouth, but was prevented from doing so by the refusal of the then Dean to retire.

Bishop Monahan died in post on 10 August 1945.

Church in Wales titles
Preceded by Gilbert Joyce	Bishop of Monmouth; 1940–1945	Succeeded by Alfred Morris
