= Priory Church of St Mary, Usk =

- Priory Church of St Mary, Usk
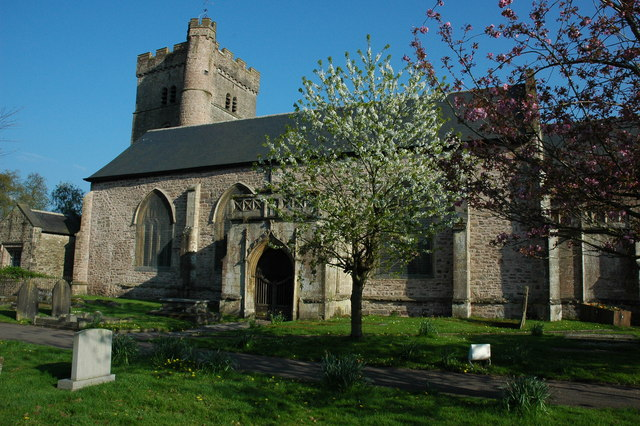
- Priory Church of St Mary
- Priory Church of St Mary, Usk
- 51.7021°N 2.8988°W
- Location: Usk, Monmouthshire
- Country: Wales
- Denomination: Church in Wales

History
- Status: Active
- Dedication: St Mary the Virgin

Architecture
- Functional status: Parish church
- Heritage designation: Grade I
- Designated: 1 April 1974
- Style: Perpendicular
- Years built: 12th century onwards

Administration
- Diocese: Monmouth
- Parish: Heart of Monmouthshire Ministry Area

Clergy
- Rector: Rev'd Sally Ingle-Gillis

The Priory Church of St Mary is the parish church of Usk, Monmouthshire, Wales. Its origin was as the church of Usk Priory, a Benedictine nunnery founded by Richard de Clare, 2nd Earl of Pembroke in the twelfth century. After the Dissolution of the Monasteries the church became the parish church of the town. Extended and restored in the middle of the nineteenth century, it was again restored in 1899–1900. The church was designated a Grade I listed building on 4 January 1974.

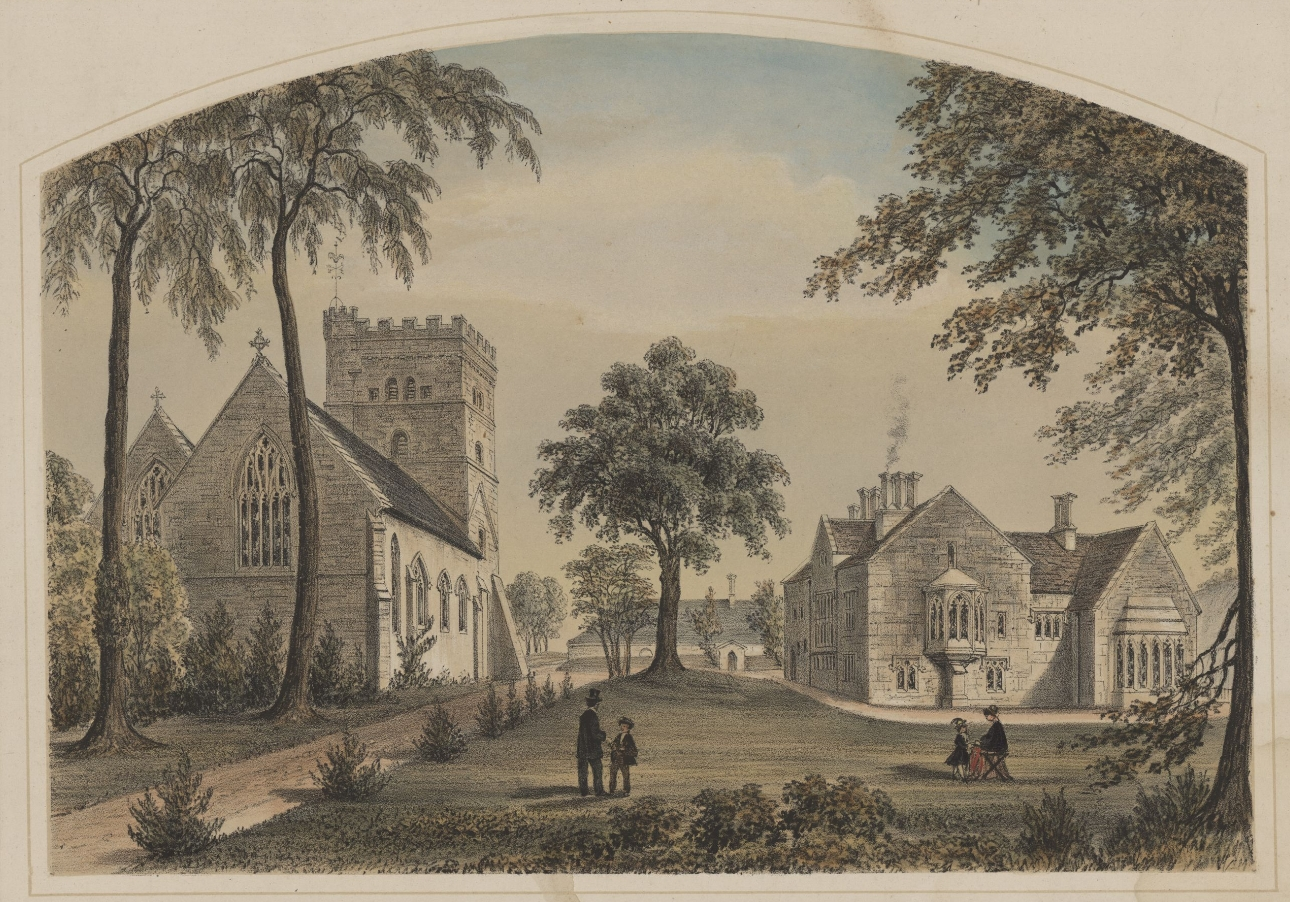
Usk Church and the old priory, 1860

== History and architecture ==
The site of the church shows no evidence of a pre-Conquest church, and the earliest religious building there may have been a Norman church associated with Usk Castle on the site of the present West nave. In the years before his death in 1176, Richard de Clare, 2nd Earl of Pembroke founded a Benedictine nunnery on the site. In the thirteenth century the North aisle was added as a place of worship for the people of the town, separated with a screen from the parts of the priory used exclusively by the nuns. In the fifteenth century, two "splendid two-storeyed Perpendicular porches" were added to the North and West aisles, the probable builder being Sir William Herbert, who was also building on a grand scale at nearby Raglan Castle.

After the Dissolution of the Monasteries in the late 1530s, the priory church became the parish church of the town. Extensive restoration and new building occurred in 1884 when Thomas Henry Wyatt created a sanctuary by roofing over the crossing space next to the tower and added a further bay to the nave. A further restoration was undertaken in 1899–1900, when G E Halliday inserted new windows and re-roofed the nave and aisle.

== Organ ==
The church houses a fine Gray and Davison organ of 1861 which it was built to a scheme devised by Sir Frederick Gore Ousely for Llandaff Cathedral.

The total cost of the organ when erected was £1094, and for thirty-seven years it gave good service at Llandaff, with no more than normal tuning and maintenance. C. Lee Williams was organist from 1876 to 1882, and on his preferment to Gloucester Cathedral drew unfavourable comparisons between the condition of the Renatus Harris organ there and that of the larger and more resourceful one he was leaving at the much smaller cathedral of Llandaff. Towards the end of the century, however, the Llandaff organ was felt to be inadequate for the cathedral. The Gray and Davison instrument was advertised for sale and in 1900 it was re-erected at Usk in memory of Hely Bennet Rickards, at the expense of his parents.

=== Specification ===
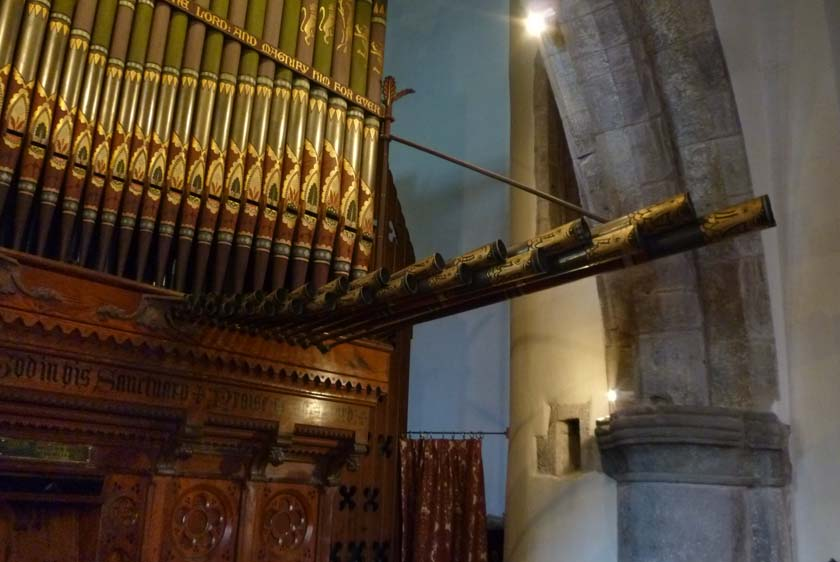
Horizontal pipes of the church organ

Great	ft
Bourdon	16
Open Diapason	8
Gamba	8
Stopped Diapason	8
Principal	4
Harmonic Flute	4
Twelfth	2 2/3
Fifteenth	2
Mixture	III
Trumpet	8

Swell	ft
Double Diapason (stopped wood)	16
Open Diapason	8
Stopped Diapason	8
Keraulophon (stopped wood bass)	8
Gemshorn	4
Fifteenth	2
Mixture	II
Cornopean	8
Oboe	8
Clarion	4

Choir	ft
Double Diapason (stopped metal)	16
Dulciana	8
Spitz Flute	8
Clarionet Flute	8
Stopped Diapason Bass	8
Gemshorn	4
Flute (metal)	4
Piccolo	2
Clarinet	8

Pedal	ft
Open Diapason (wood)	16
Bourdon	16
Principal (metal)	8
Trombone (wood tubes)	16

== Priory Gatehouse ==
The gatehouse to the original Benedictine nunnery stands at the entrance to the churchyard.
