= Cwmcarvan =

Coordinates: 51.76373°N 2.75923°W

Cwmcarvan: Welsh: Cwmcarfan
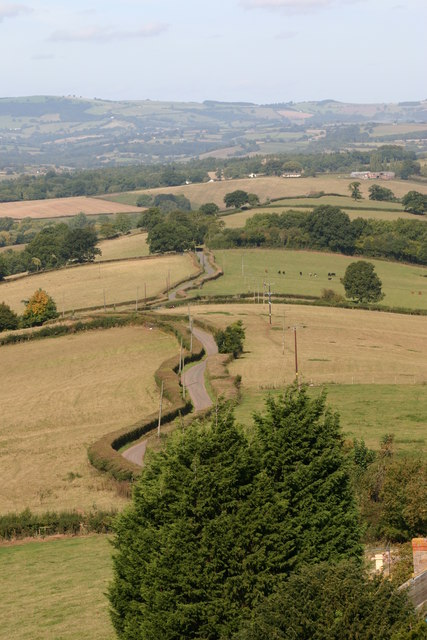
- Countryside at Cwmcarvan, pictured from the top of the church tower

- Location within Monmouthshire
- OS grid reference: SO476075
- Community: Mitchel Troy
- Principal area: Monmouthshire
- Preserved county: Gwent
- Country: Wales
- Sovereign state: United Kingdom
- Post town: MONMOUTH
- Postcode district: NP25
- Dialling code: 01600
- Police: Gwent
- Fire: South Wales
- Ambulance: Welsh
- UK Parliament: Monmouth

Cwmcarvan (Welsh: Cwmcarfan) is a small rural village in Monmouthshire, south east Wales. It is located 4 miles (6 km) south west of Monmouth and about 4 miles (6 km) east of Raglan, off the old A40 road two miles (3 km) north west of Trellech.

== History and amenities ==
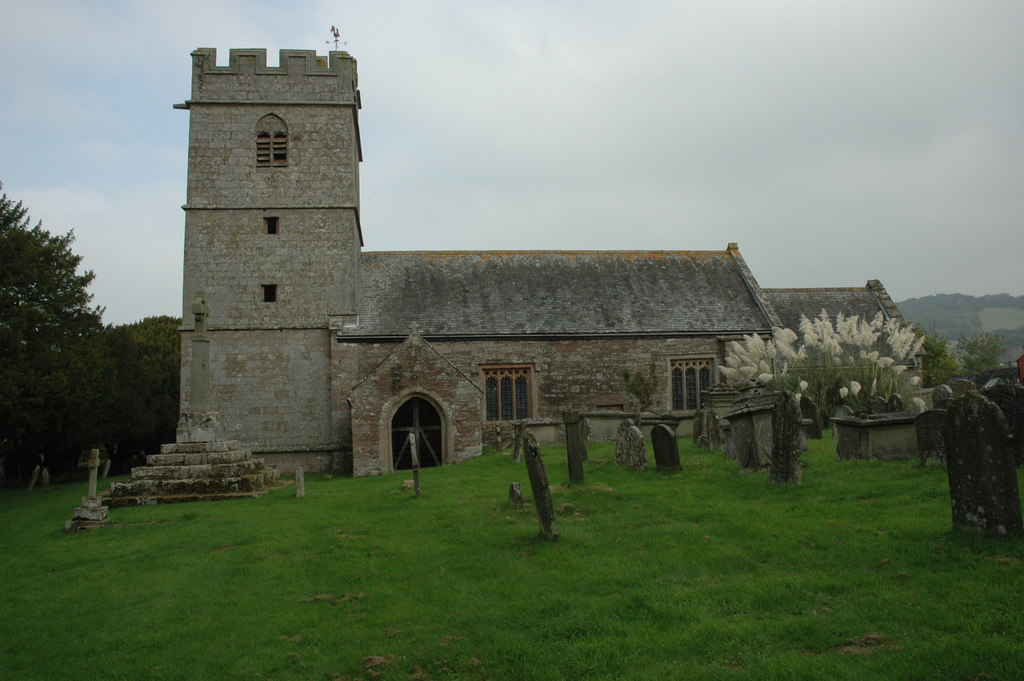
The church of St. Catwg

=== Church of St. Catwg ===
The church dates from the 13th or 14th century. It is in the Early English and Perpendicular styles, with some 16th-century features. It was heavily restored in the 1870s. The dedication is to St Catwg or Cadoc, a Welsh saint of the 6th century. There are porches on both the south and north sides, supposedly so that the squires of Cwmbychan and Trevildu within the parish did not have to enter through the same door as each other.

=== Craig-y-dorth ===
The hill of Craig-y-dorth, 1 mile (1.6 km) north east of the church, was the site of a battle in 1404 between Owain Glyndŵr's army and English forces. According to the Annals of Owain Glyn Dwr, "There the English were killed for the most part and they were pursued up to the gates of the town" (of Monmouth). The hamlet of Craig-y-dorth is one of the only two communities in Monmouthshire with its own flag, the other being the town of Monmouth.

Flag of Craig-y-dorth

=== High Glanau ===
The house at High Glanau was built in 1923 for the writer and garden designer Henry Avray Tipping.
