= St Padarn's Institute =

College in Cardiff, Wales

- St Michael's College
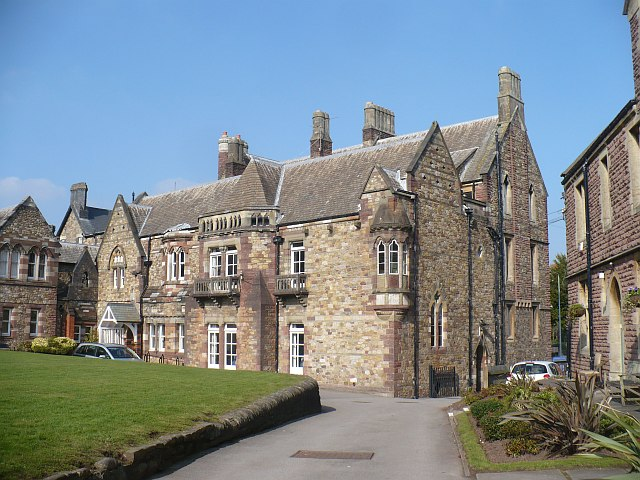
- "Bland and uninspired", John Newman

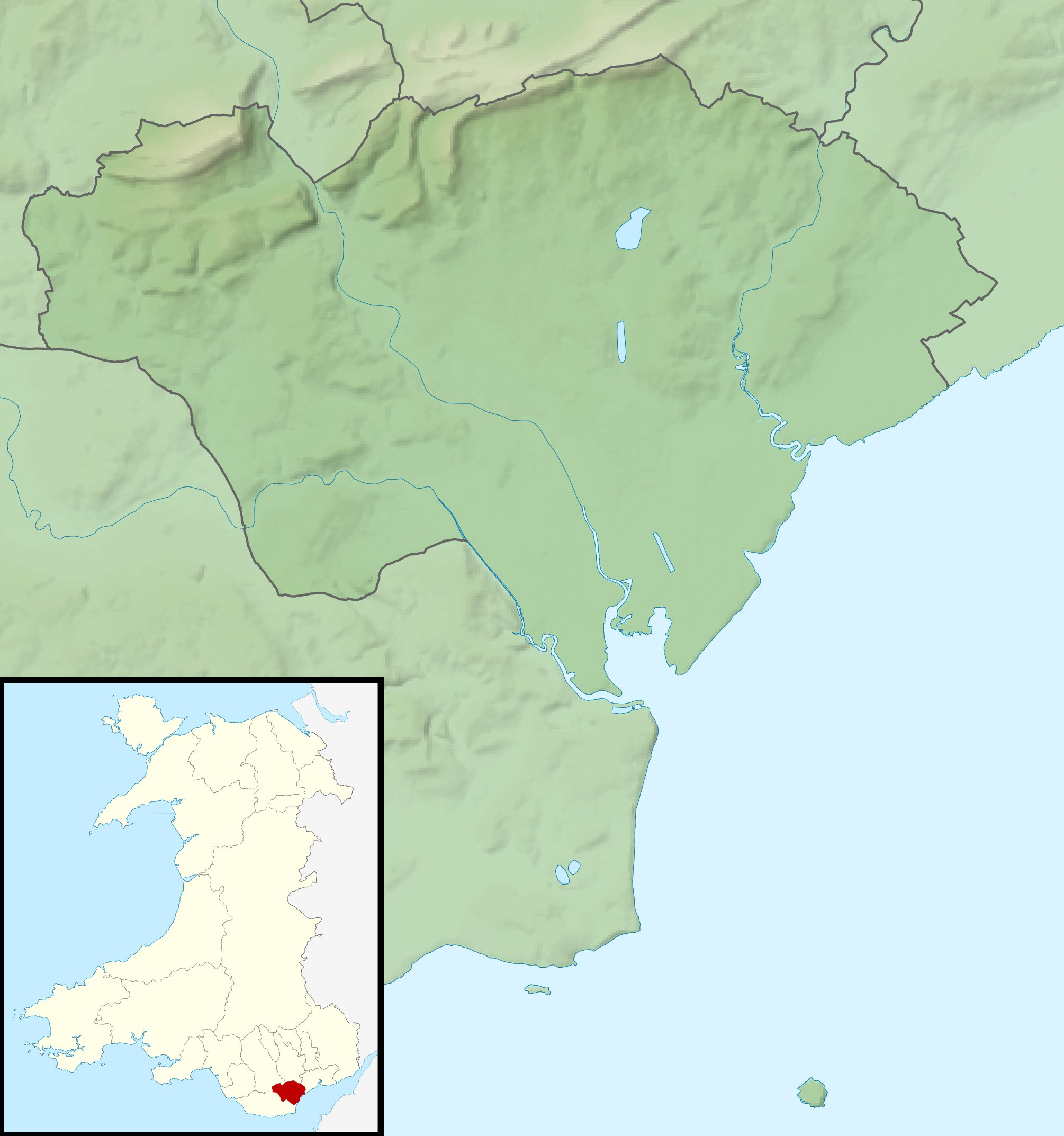
- Location within Cardiff
- 51.4930°N 3.2187°W
- Type: College
- Location: Llandaff, Cardiff, Glamorgan

History
- Built: 1880s-1950s

Site notes
- Architect(s): John Prichard, F. R. Kempson, George Pace
- Architectural styles: Gothic Revival, Modernist

Listed Building – Grade II
- Official name: St Michael's College
- Designated: 25 January 1966
- Reference no.: 13657

Listed Building – Grade I
- Official name: Chapel of St Michael's College (St Padarn's Institute)
- Designated: 27 April 2004
- Reference no.: 82676

Listed Building – Grade II
- Official name: Apartments 1-3, St Michael's College
- Designated: 25 January 1966
- Reference no.: 81256

St Padarn's Institute is a theological training college owned by the Church in Wales, located in Llandaff in the north of the city of Cardiff, Wales. It operates as a residential training college for its full time ministers. The origins of St Padarn's are in St Michael's College, an Anglican training college founded by the Church of England in Aberdare in 1892. In 1907 St Michael's relocated to Llandaff. Among its many alumni was the poet R. S. Thomas. The original building on the site was a house by John Prichard, the diocesan architect for Llandaff, built for himself. After his death, that building was incorporated into St Michael's. Other college buildings were constructed mainly to the designs of F. R. Kempson between 1905 and 1920. In the late 1950s, a chapel was built by George Pace. The college had significant financial problems in the early 21st century and was eventually closed. The Church in Wales bought the site in 2016 and reopened it as St Padarn's.

== History and development ==
John Prichard was a noted ecclesiastical architect who undertook much church building and restoration in Wales, often in partnership with John Pollard Seddon. He established a practice in Llandaff, Cardiff, becoming 'Resident Diocesan Architect' in December 1844. In the mid-1860s, he began the building of a house, and attached office on the site of the future St Michael's. Following his death in 1886, control passed to the Church of England, which began the building of a residential seminary for the training of priests. The main college buildings were designed by F. R. Kempson and built between 1904 and 1907. In the 1950s, a college chapel was designed by George Pace.

In 2016, following a review, A report on the future of theological training in the Church in Wales, the college closed as a residential centre, with the training of priests devolved to individual dioceses. St Padarn's Institute took over the old St Michael's buildings and the mandate for training Welsh Priests and other licensed ministers was centralised at St Padarn's at the end of 2016. The Cardiff site became the home for residential and administration activities, but with training taking place under the name of St Padarn's Institute for all Church in Wales licensed and ordained ministers across the whole of Wales.

Postgraduate courses in Chaplaincy studies, Youth, Children and Family Specialisms and general Theology developed under the umbrella of St Padarn's, with students attending from all parts of the UK. Through a programme called Theology for Life St Padarns also provides a part time degree course to hundreds of people across Wales.

== Architecture and description ==
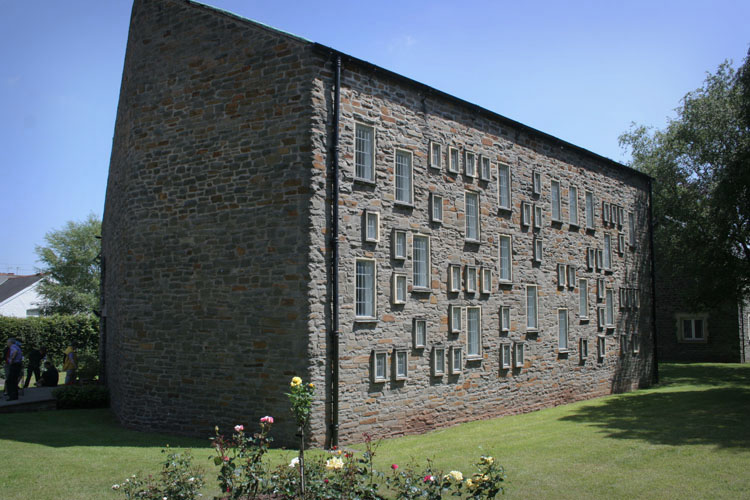
The Grade I listed chapel

The architectural historian John Newman, writing in his Glamorgan Pevsner, describes the design of Prichard's office and house as "sprightly". He is less complimentary about F. R. Kempson's large-scale additions for the college, which he considers "bland and uninspired". Prichard's building uses a polychromatic blend of rubble and blue brick with stone dressings, while Kempson deployed sandstone with Bath stone dressings. The college, and a block of three apartments within it, are designated Grade II.

=== Chapel ===
The most highly regarded building in the complex is the chapel by Pace. Constructed to a Modernist design, Newman noted the influence of Le Corbusier's Notre-Dame du Haut, and considered, "[Pace] has created a numinous space by means of light and its reflection from smooth surfaces". Cadw describes it as Pace's best work in Wales, "an exceptional example of post-war ecclesiastical architecture". The chapel is designated a Grade I listed building.

== Leadership ==
=== Wardens of St Michael's College ===
- Glyn Simon (later Bishop of Llandaff and Archbishop of Wales)
- Eryl Stephen Thomas (later Bishop of Monmouth and Bishop of Llandaff)
- Harold John Charles (later Bishop of St Asaph)
- O. G. Rees
- John Hughes (later Bishop of Kensington)
- John Rowlands
- John Holdsworth
- Peter Sedgwick 2004–2014
- Mark Clavier (Acting principal) 2014-2016

=== Principals of St Padarn's Institute ===
- Revd Professor Jeremy Duff (married to Jill Duff, the Bishop of Lancaster)
- Revd Dr Jordan Hillebert

=== Deans of St Padarn's Institute ===
- Revd Dr Manon Ceridwen James
- Revd Dr Mark Griffiths JP

== Alumni ==
- Leonard Hodgson
- Alwyn Rice Jones (Bishop of St Asaph and Archbishop of Wales)
- R. S. Thomas (poet and priest)
- John David Edward Davies (Archbishop of Wales and Bishop of Swansea and Brecon)
- Gregory Kenneth Cameron (Bishop of St Asaph)
- John Wyn Evans (Bishop of St David's)
- Richard Pain (Bishop of Monmouth)
- Paul Groves (poet and critic)
- Martin Dudley (priest)
- Raymond Roberts (Chaplain of the Fleet)

== Sources ==
- Newman, John (1995). Glamorgan. The Buildings of Wales. London, UK: Penguin. ISBN 0140710566.
- — (2000). Gwent/Monmouthshire. The Buildings of Wales. London: Penguin. ISBN 0-14-071053-1.
- Walker, David (1976). "Disestablishment and Independence". A History of the Church in Wales. Penarth: Church in Wales Publications. ISBN 0-85326-0-11-7.
