= Llanvapley =

Village in Monmouthshire, Wales

Coordinates: 51.82189°N 2.92416°W

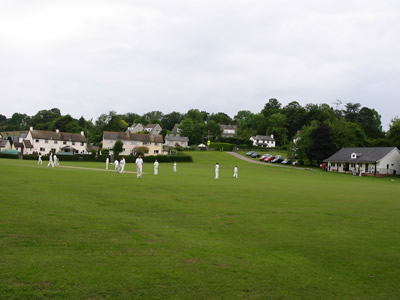
Llanvapley Sports field and village hall

Llanvapley (Welsh: Llanfable) is a village in the community of Gobion Fawr, in Monmouthshire, Wales, United Kingdom. Llan replaced the (earlier) Eglwys (1254).

It is at grid reference SO364141 and is on the B4233 road.
