= William Crawley (cricketer) =

Welsh cricketer and clergyman

Personal information
- Full name: William Parry Crawley
- Born: 24 August 1842; Bryngwyn, Monmouthshire, Wales
- Died: 9 May 1907 (aged 64); Walberton, Sussex, England
- Batting: Unknown
- Relatives: Charles Farmer (nephew)

Domestic team information
- Years: Team
- 1867: Marylebone Cricket Club

Career statistics
Competition	First-class
Matches	1
Runs scored	0
Batting average	0.00
100s/50s	–/–
Top score	0
Catches/stumpings	–/–
- Source: Cricinfo, 31 May 2021

William Parry Crawley (24 August 1842 – 9 May 1907) was a Welsh first-class cricketer and clergyman.

The son of the priest William Crawley, he was born in August 1842 at Bryngwyn, Monmouthshire. He was educated at Marlborough College, before going up to Trinity College, Cambridge. He was a member of Cambridge University Cricket Club, but did not feature in first-class cricket for the club, but did play a single first-class match for the Marylebone Cricket Club against Cambridge University at Fenner's in 1867. He batted once in the match, being dismissed without scoring by Francis Pelham.

After graduating from Cambridge he took holy orders in the Anglican Church, being ordained as a deacon in 1868. His first ecclesiastical post was as curate at Shepton Mallet in Somerset from 1868 to 1871, before relocating to Sussex to become curate at West Stoke. He was appointed vicar at Chichester in 1871, a post he held until 1878. While at Chichester he was currently a chaplain to military forces stationed in the city. From 1878 to 1899 he was vicar at West Firle with Beddingham, and from 1899 until his death in May 1907, he was vicar at Walberton. His brother was the writer and academic Richard Crawley.
