= Skirrid Fawr =

Hill (486 m) in Monmouthshire, Wales

- Ysgyryd Fawr
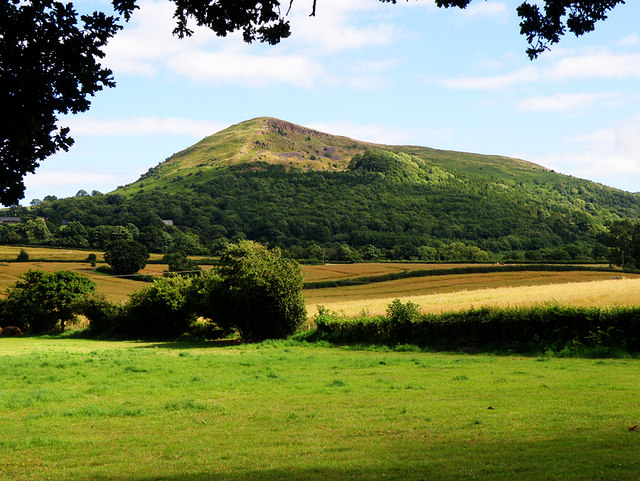
- Ysgyryd Fawr from the north-west

Highest point
- Elevation: 486 m (1,594 ft)
- Prominence: 344 m (1,129 ft)
- Parent peak: Sugar Loaf
- Listing: Marilyn
- Coordinates: 51.858386°N 2.970816°W

Naming
- English translation: Great shattered [hill]
- Language of name: Welsh
- Pronunciation: Welsh: [ɐsˈɡɐɾɪd ˈvæuɾ]

Geography
- Location within Monmouthshire
- Location: Monmouthshire, Wales
- Parent range: Black Mountains
- OS grid: SO331182
- Topo map: OS Landranger 161

Skirrid Fawr (Welsh: Ysgyryd Fawr, Welsh pronunciation: [ɐsˈɡɐɾɪd ˈvæuɾ]), often referred to as just the Skirrid, is a traditional Christian pilgrimage site and an easterly outlier of the Black Mountains in Wales. It forms the easternmost part of the Brecon Beacons National Park. The smaller hill of Ysgyryd Fach or "Little Skirrid" (270 metres or 890 feet) lies about 2 1/2 miles (4 kilometres) south.

It is 486 metres (1,594 feet) high and lies just to the north-east of Abergavenny, Monmouthshire, about ten miles (16 kilometres) from the English border. The Beacons Way passes along the ridge.

== Geology ==
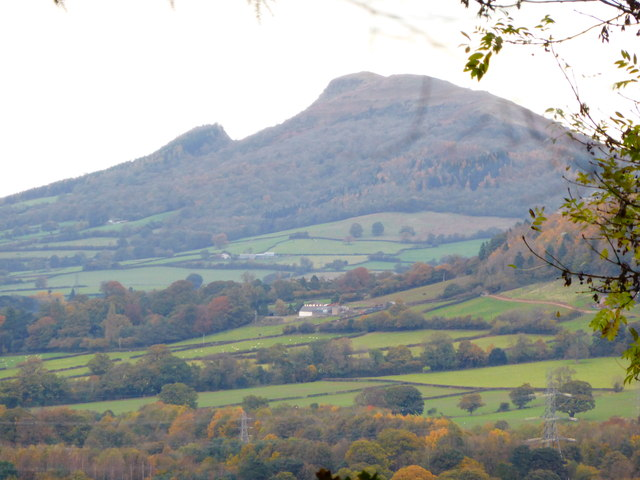
The distinctive landslip viewed from the south

The distinctive shape of this Old Red Sandstone hill comprises a long ridge oriented nearly north–south, with a jagged western side resulting from ice age landslips. The upper slopes of the hill are composed of Devonian-age sandstones assigned to the Senni Formation (formerly known as the "Senni Beds"). These overlie weaker mudstones of the St Maughans Formation—a situation which has contributed to the instability of the hill's steep flanks, resulting in extensive landslips, notably affecting the north-western flanks of the hill. There are numerous other landslips of a similar nature on the nearby hills, although that on the Skirrid is perhaps the most well known owing to its visibility from several directions. Some of the landslide areas contain numerous jumbled blocks of sandstone, one of which is known as the "Devil's Table". The ridge is very similar in its rocky edge to that found on the Black Hill to the north in Herefordshire.

== Cultural associations ==
The Welsh name Ysgyryd meaning 'split' or 'shattered' and Fawr meaning 'great' describes the hill's shape. There is a rich mythology attached to the hill, including a distinctive stone known as the Devil's Table. According to legend, part of the hill is said to have been broken off at the moment of the crucifixion of Jesus. There was a local tradition that earth from the Skirrid was holy and especially fertile, and it was taken away to be scattered on fields elsewhere, on coffins, and in the foundations of churches. Christian pilgrimages were traditionally made, especially on Michaelmas Eve, to the summit.

== History ==
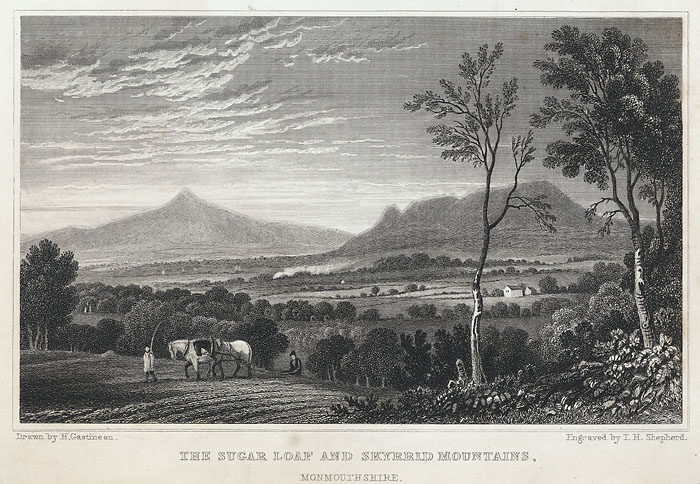
Engraving c 1830 of The Sugar Loaf and Skyrrid mountains

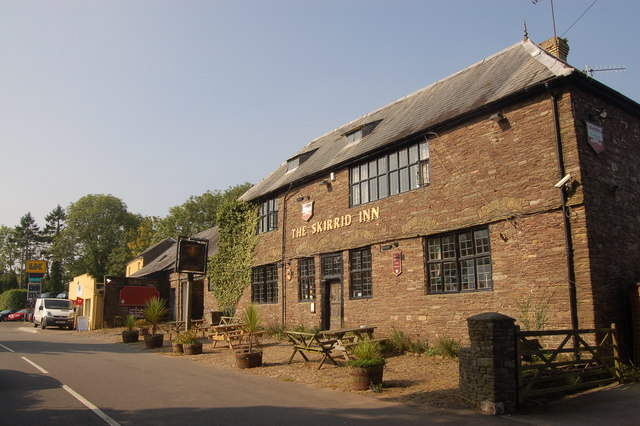
The Skirrid Inn

In older literature the spelling Skyrrid is sometimes encountered and the hill is also referred to locally as the Holy Mountain or Sacred Hill. The ruins of an Iron Age hillfort and a mediæval chapel, dedicated to St. Michael, lie at the summit. During the religious persecution of the Catholic Church in Wales, which began under Henry VIII and ended only with Catholic Emancipation in 1829, the mountain remained a regular site of Christian pilgrimage. Furthermore, the illegal and underground Jesuit mission based at Cwm and led by future Catholic martyr St. David Lewis, regularly visited the ruined chapel atop Ysgyryd Fawr, which was the site of a Mass rock. In 1676, Pope Clement X promised a plenary indulgence to those who went up the mountain upon Michaelmas. In 1678, local magistrate and priest hunter John Arnold alleged in the House of Commons that, "he hath seen a hundred Papists meet at the top of Skyrrid for Mass."

Rudolf Hess used to walk here when he was held prisoner at nearby Maindiff Court during the early 1940s. North of the hill at Llanvihangel Crucorney, The Skirrid Inn claims to be one of the oldest pubs in Wales.

== Ownership and access ==
Ysgyryd Fawr has belonged to the National Trust since 1939. The summit offers views of the Sugar Loaf to the west, and Blorenge to the south, and the ridge is easily accessed on foot from a car park beside the B4521 Ross Road. The ascent is steep initially through woods, but gradual thereafter as open ground is reached. The main path follows the crest of the mountain north to the trig point and chapel remains which mark the summit. A rough path follows the perimeter of the hill at a much lower level.
