= Frederick Parker (cricketer) =

English cricketer

Personal information
- Full name: Frederick Anthony Vivian Parker
- Born: 11 February 1913; Westminster, London, England
- Died: 26 May 1988 (aged 75); Plymouth, Devon, England
- Batting: Right-handed
- Bowling: Right-arm medium
- Relatives: William Parker (father); Charles Farmer (father-in-law)

Domestic team information
- Years: Team
- 1946: Hampshire
- 1949: Devon

Career statistics
| Competition | First-class |
|---|---|
| Matches | 5 |
| Runs scored | 147 |
| Batting average | 16.33 |
| 100s/50s | 1/– |
| Top score | 116 |
| Catches/stumpings | 2/– |
- Source: Cricinfo, 11 January 2010

Frederick Anthony Vivian Parker DL JP (11 February 1913 — 26 May 1988) was an English first-class cricketer and British Army officer.

The son of William Parker, he was born at Westminster in February 1913. He was educated at Winchester College, before attending the Royal Military College, Sandhurst. Parker was commissioned into the Rifle Brigade as a second lieutenant in February 1933, with promotion to lieutenant in February 1936. He served in the Second World War, during which he was promoted to captain in February 1941. Following the war, he made his debut in first-class cricket for Hampshire against the touring Indians at Southampton in 1946. In that same season, he made three first-class appearances for the Combined Services cricket team, prior to making a second appearance for Hampshire against Kent at Canterbury. In five first-class matches, Parker scored 147 runs at an average of 16.33; he made one century, a score of 116 for the Combined Services against Northamptonshire at Kettering.

Parker was promoted to major in July 1946. In 1949, he played minor counties cricket for Devon, making two appearances in the Minor Counties Championship. Parker retired from active military service in May 1953 and ceased to belong to the Reserve of Officers in February 1963. He was appointed a deputy lieutenant for Devon in November 1964, and in the same year he was appointed a justice of the peace for Devon. Parker died at Plymouth in May 1988. He had been married to Pamela Mary Farmer since 1937; her father was the first-class cricketer Charles Farmer.
