= St John's Church, Abergavenny =

Coordinates: 51.8220°N 3.0194°W

St. Johns's Church, Abergavenny
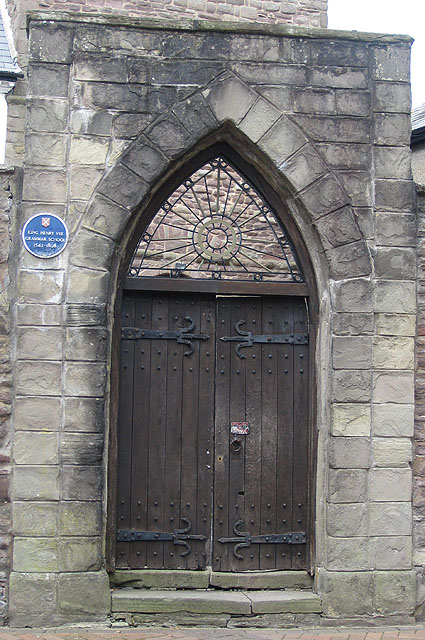
- Gateway to tower
- St. Johns's Church, Abergavenny

History
- Status: parish church
- Dedication: St. John

Architecture
- Functional status: masonic lodge
- Heritage designation: Grade II* listed building
- Designated: 5 July 1952

Administration
- Parish: Abergavenny

St John's Church was the parish church for Abergavenny, Monmouthshire until the Dissolution of the Monasteries when the priory church of St Mary's Priory became the parish church. The church then became a grammar school and is now part of a masonic lodge. The only parts of the church that still remain are the tower and part of the nave.

== History ==
The church was the oldest church in Abergavenny, with the tower and nave dating from the 14th century. The bell in the tower was rung to signal the start of the curfew when the town gates were closed at night. When the nearby Benedictine priory (dedicated to St Mary) was dissolved in 1536 it only had a prior and four monks and the nave of the priory church was already being used by the people of the town. The people petitioned Henry VIII to make St Mary's the parish church, which happened in 1539.

In 1542 or 1543, St John's was seized by Henry VIII to become the King Henry VIII Grammar School which was funded by tithes (taxes) previously paid to St Mary's Priory, and also the tithes from the rectory at Badgeworth, Gloucestershire, previously paid to another Benedictine priory dedicated to St Mary at Usk. The school was the first grammar school in the county.

The embattled tower was rebuilt c. 1750, and was later described as "... a curious piece of antiquarianism for the mid C18".

The building continued as a school until a new building opened in Pen-y-pound in 1998.

In 1899 local architect E. A. Johnson (who was a freemason), converted the old school into a masonic lodge, known as the Second Philanthropic Lodge. In 1902 the lodge was renamed to St. John's Lodge, and is now known simply as Abergavenny Masonic Hall or Centre. The lodge holds four masonic certificates (given to new members) from an older (French) masonic lodge in Monk Street. The certificates were issued in 1813 and 1814 to French officers who were prisoners of war sent to Abergavenny.

The lodge became a listed building on 5 July 1952.
