= William Crawley (priest) =

William Crawley (20 April 1803 in Rotherfield – 12 January 1896 in Bryngwyn) was a long serving 19th-century Welsh Anglican priest, most notably Archdeacon of Monmouth for over forty years.

Crawley was educated at Shrewsbury and Magdalene College, Cambridge. He was a Fellow of Magdalen from 1824 to 1834. Crawley was ordained deacon in 1825 and priest in 1826. He held livings at Llanvihangel (1831–1858) and Bryngwyn (1834–1896). He was Archdeacon of Monmouth from 1844 to 1885.

His eldest son Richard was a noted classical scholar, while his youngest son William was a cricketer and clergyman.
