= Castle (Abergavenny ward) =

Coordinates: 51.818°N 3.012°W

- Electoral ward
- Location within Monmouthshire
- Population: 1,797 (2011 census)
- Community: Abergavenny
- Principal area: Monmouthshire
- Country: Wales
- Sovereign state: United Kingdom
- UK Parliament: Monmouth
- Senedd Cymru – Welsh Parliament: Monmouth
- Councillors: 1 (County), 3 (Town)

Castle is an electoral ward in Abergavenny, Monmouthshire. The ward elects councillors to Abergavenny Town Council and Monmouthshire County Council.

The ward covers an area south and east of the town centre, including Abergavenny Castle itself in the western corner and the residential areas west of the mainline railway line.

According to the 2011 UK Census the population of the ward 1,797.

== Town Council elections ==
Up to three town councillors are elected or co-opted from the Castle ward to Abergavenny Town Council.

At the May 2017 elections, there was no contest, with three candidates (two Labour and one Conservative) standing for the three seats. Labour councillor, Stephen Head, resigned in 2018 leading to a by-election being arranged for 26 June. The vacant seat was won by the Conservatives.

== County Council elections ==
Castle elects one county councillor to Monmouthshire County Council. Since its first election in 2004 (split from Castle & Grofield) the ward has been represented by the Conservative Party. The ward's county councillor since 2008 has been retired businesswoman Maureen Powell. In May 2017 she became Chair of the county council.

Prior to 2004 the Castle & Grofield ward was represented by the Labour Party.

== See also ==
- Priory (Abergavenny ward)
