= Arthur Farmer =

Arthur Farmer may refer to:

- Art Farmer, American jazz musician
- Arthur Farmer (cricketer), English cricketer and barrister
