= Abergavenny Town Hall =

Municipal Building in Abergavenny, Wales

- Neuadd y Dref Y Fenni (Welsh)
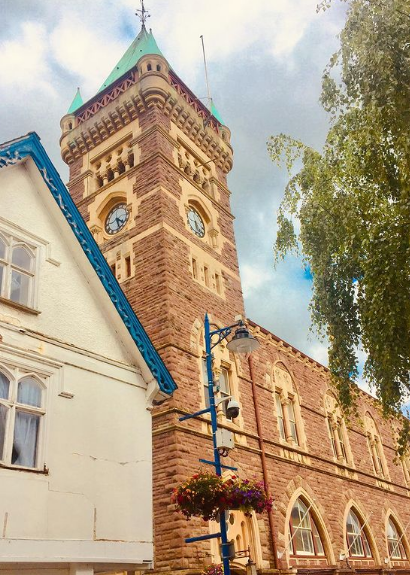
- Clock Tower

- Shown in Monmouthshire
- 51.8220°N 3.0181°W
- Location: Abergavenny

History
- Built: 1869 - 1871

Site notes
- Architect: Wilson and Willcox
- Architectural style: Gothic Revival style

Listed Building – Grade II
- Designated: 11 February 1971
- Reference no.: 2416

Abergavenny Town Hall (Welsh: Neuadd y Dref Y Fenni) is a municipal building located on Cross Street, Abergavenny in Monmouthshire, Wales. The town hall, which also houses the town's market, is a Grade II listed building.

== History ==
The first building on the site was a market hall which had been financed by a legacy from the local member of parliament, Philip Jones, and which was completed in the early 17th century. Following their appointment in 1794, one of the first acts of the new Abergavenny Improvement Commissioners was to commission a new market hall which was designed by the well-known Regency and Georgian era architect, John Nash, and completed in 1796. In the 1860s, in anticipation of a further increases in their responsibilities, including those of an urban sanitary authority, the commissioners decided to procure a town hall which would be built on the same site.

Construction of the new building, which was built with old red sandstone with Bath limestone and slate roofs, started in 1869. It was designed by Wilson and Willcox of Bath in the Gothic Revival style, built by S. J. Moreland and Sons of Gloucester and completed in 1871. The design involved an asymmetrical main frontage with five bays facing onto Cross Street; the central section featured an archway leading to a market hall flanked by two gothic windows on each side. There were five two-light sash windows divided by Corinthian order columns on the first floor and there was a clock tower with a copper roof at the north west corner. The building incorporated a corn exchange, municipal offices, a council chamber, a market hall, an assembly room and the local poor law offices. The assembly room was converted for use as a theatre in 1906 and subsequent performers there included the rock band, The Beatles, who gave a concert in June 1963.

The building served as the headquarters of the Abergavenny Urban District Council for much of the 20th century but ceased to be local seat of government when the enlarged Monmouth District Council was formed in 1974. Abergavenny Town Council, which was formed in 1981, made the building its home and installed two members of staff there. Subsequent improvements included the modernisation of the theatre in 1996.

The cattle market, which had been held on the site for over 150 years, moved to Bryngwyn in Monmouthshire in December 2013. Other types of market continued to be held in the building, including a flea market which continued to be held there every Wednesday. A programme of works, designed by GWP Architecture and costing £2.2 million, to convert the building into a community hub was completed in September 2020.
