= Priory (Abergavenny ward) =

Coordinates: 51.825°N 3.015°W

Larkfield
- Electoral ward
- Location within Monmouthshire
- Population: 2,196 (2011 census)
- Community: Abergavenny
- Principal area: Monmouthshire
- Country: Wales
- Sovereign state: United Kingdom
- UK Parliament: Monmouth
- Senedd Cymru – Welsh Parliament: Monmouth
- Councillors: 1 (County), 3 (Town)

Priory is an electoral ward in Abergavenny, Monmouthshire. The ward elects councillors to Abergavenny Town Council and Monmouthshire County Council.

The ward covers the central area of the town northeast of the main shopping area, bounded to the north by Park Crescent and surrounding Bailey Park.

According to the 2001 UK Census the population of the ward was 1,942, increasing to 2,196 by the 2011 UK Census.

== Town Council elections ==
Up to three town councillors are elected or co-opted from the Priory ward to Abergavenny Town Council.

In July 2016 the Labour Party won its first seat on the ward when local teacher, Tudor Thomas, won a town council seat from the Conservatives in a by-election. At the May 2017 elections two of the seats were won by Labour (with Cllr Thomas topping the poll) and the third was won by the Conservatives.

== County Council elections ==
Priory elects one county councillor to Monmouthshire County Council. At the May 2017 elections the ward was won by a three votes majority, after three recounts. Labour candidate Tudor Thomas beat incumbent Conservative councillor, John Prosser, by 348 votes to 345.

The Conservatives had previously held the seat since 1999.

== See also ==
- Castle (Abergavenny ward)
