= Pen-y-Fal Hospital =

Former psychiatric hospital in Abergavenny, Monmouthshire, Wales

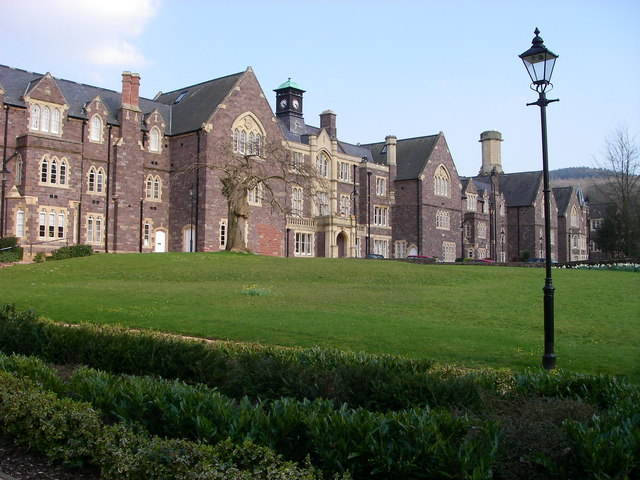
- Main hospital converted to accommodation (2007)

- Shown in Monmouthshire

Geography
- Location: Abergavenny, Monmouthshire, Wales
- Coordinates: 51.824246°N 3.009164°W

Organisation
- Care system: NHS
- Type: Specialist

Services
- Beds: 1,170 (at peak)
- Speciality: Mental health

History
- Founded: 1 December 1851
- Closed: 1997

Links
- Lists: Hospitals in Wales

Pen-y-Fal Hospital (Welsh: Ysbyty Pen-y-Fal) was a psychiatric hospital in Abergavenny, Monmouthshire. The main building is Grade II listed.

== History ==
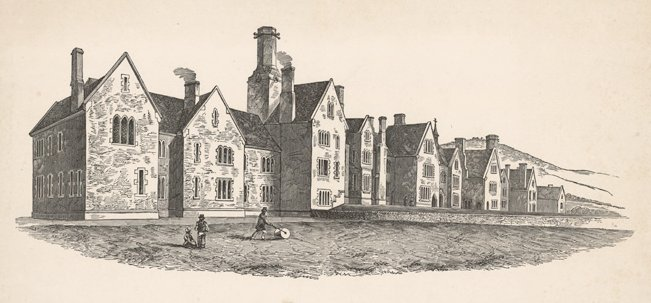
The Joint Counties' Lunatic Asylum, "Hereford Journal Almanac", 1850

The hospital was designed by Thomas Fulljames using a corridor plan layout. It was built in the Gothic style using local old red sandstone with Bath stone dressings and opened as the Joint Counties' Lunatic Asylum in December 1851. It initially had 210 inmates in 12 wards and was set in grounds of 75 acres of landscaping.

A new infirmary wing was completed in 1861 and a laundry block was added in 1875. The central administration block and the epileptic block were completed in 1883 and the working men's dormitory was opened in 1891. At its peak at the end of the century it had 1,170 patients.

It became the Monmouthshire Asylum in 1897 and was renamed the Monmouth Mental Hospital in 1930 before joining the National Health Service as Pen-y-Val Hospital in 1948. After the introduction of Care in the Community in the early 1980s the hospital went into a period of decline and it finally closed in 1997.

Between 1851 and 1950, over 3,000 patients died at the hospital. A memorial plaque for the deceased has now been placed at the site.

The main hospital building was converted into luxury accommodation by Redrow plc under the name "Sarno Square" in 2001.

== See also ==
- History of psychiatric institutions
- History of mental disorders
