= Abergavenny fireworks display =

Coordinates: 51.828021°N 3.035048°W

The Abergavenny fireworks display is an annual organized fireworks display held each year on 5 November, Guy Fawkes Night in Abergavenny, Wales. The event takes place in Belgrave Park, at the Nevill Hall Hospital end of town (not at the hospital itself). It has been running each year since 1968.

The event is run and organized by the local social networking club Abergavenny and District Round Table, which is one of the branches in the UK of the Round Table. It is a nonprofit event with all proceeds being distributed to charities and good causes, primarily in and around the Abergavenny area. Some of those to have benefited from monies raised from the Abergavenny fireworks display include: Abergavenny Scouts, Crickhowell Scouts, Jigsaw community project, Llanbedr Village Thai Boxing, Mardy Juniors Football, RTB Ebbw Vale Junior AFC Club, a fuller list is on the Abergavenny and District Round Table website.

== History ==
The Abergavenny fireworks display was originally started to provide a display for the children's home in 1965 it moved to its current location of Belgrave Park in 1968 as the fireworks could be seen from the nearby Nevill Hall Hospital, the fireworks display has been put on every year since, up to the present.

== Poster competition ==
A competition is held with the help of the local schools to design a poster for the Abergavenny fireworks display. The posters are used as part of the advertising of the event. The winners and their classmates will receive child entrance tickets to the fireworks display, and the school will receive a donation.
