= St Peter's Church, Bryngwyn =

Coordinates: 51.7792°N 2.8848°W

St Peter's Church, Bryngwyn, Monmouthshire
- Church of St Peter
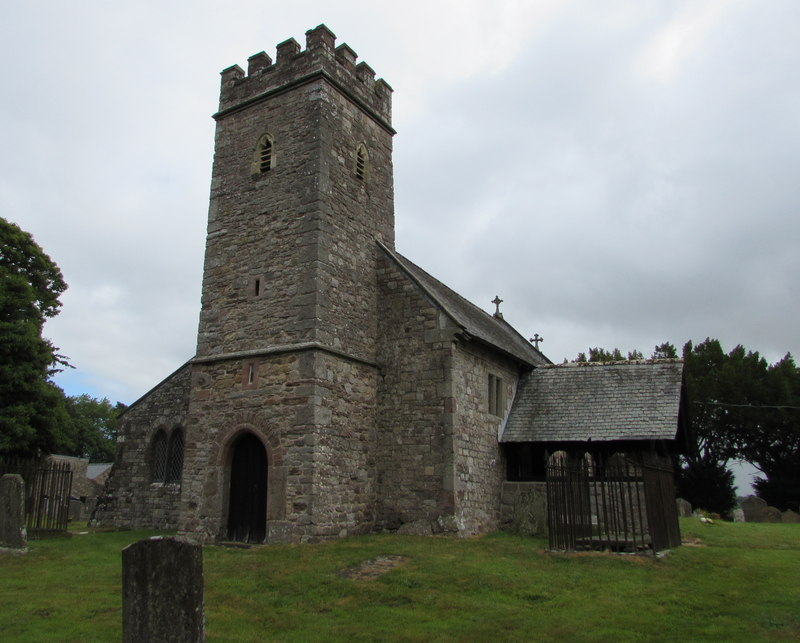
- The entrance and tower

- Location in Monmouthshire
- Location: Bryngwyn, Monmouthshire
- Country: Wales
- Denomination: Church in Wales

History
- Status: parish church
- Founded: C13th century

Architecture
- Functional status: Active
- Heritage designation: Grade II*
- Designated: 9 January 1956
- Architectural type: Church

Administration
- Diocese: Monmouth
- Archdeaconry: Monmouth
- Deanery: Raglan/Usk
- Parish: Bryngwyn

Clergy
- Rector: Rev'd Canon Sally Ingle-Gillis

The Church of St Peter, Bryngwyn, Monmouthshire, Wales is a parish church with its origins in the 13th century. It is a Grade II* listed building.

== History ==
Gerald of Wales records that a church at Bryngywn was built by Aeddan Gwaethfoed, the Lord of Clytha in 1180. The current building dates mainly from the 15th century. The church was restored in 1871 by John Prichard. Throughout that time, the rector was the Reverend William Crawley, who served from 1834 to 1896, a period of 62 years.

Near to the church is a well, also dedicated to St Peter, which was for many years the only water supply for the church and village.

== Architecture and description ==
The church is constructed of sandstone rubble in a Perpendicular style.
