= Pen-y-Pound, Abergavenny =

Cricket ground in Abergavenny, Wales

Coordinates: 51°49′45″N 3°01′30″W

Pen-y-Pound is a cricket ground in Abergavenny, Wales. It is the home of Abergavenny Cricket Club, who play in the South Wales Cricket League. The ground was first used by the Glamorgan 1st XI in 1981 for limited over matches and in 1983 for County Championship matches. Between 1985 and 1997, the ground hosted a County Championship match annually. However, Glamorgan have only used the ground twice since then.

The ground has hosted 16 first-class matches, including Glamorgan v Bangladesh A in 2005 and 3 List A matches, including Wales Minor Counties v Denmark, a Cheltenham and Gloucester Trophy match, in 2003. The ground's location makes it one of the most scenically attractive in the country.

Game Information:

Game Type	No. of Games
County Championship Matches	15
limited-over county matches	2
Twenty20 matches	0

Game Statistics: first-class:

Category	Information
Highest Team Score	Worcestershire (514/4dec against Glamorgan) in 1990 and Glamorgan (514/4dec against Gloucestershire) in 1991
Lowest Team Score	No team has been bowled out for below 100 on this ground
Best Batting Performance	Andrew Symonds (254 Runs for Gloucestershire against Glamorgan) in 1995
Best Bowling Performance	Javagal Srinath (9/76 for Gloucestershire against Glamorgan) in 1995

Game Statistics: one-day matches:

Category	Information
Highest Team Score	Glamorgan (229/7 in 40 overs against Northamptonshire) in 1982
Lowest Team Score	Glamorgan (152 in 39.2 overs against Worcestershire) in 1981
Best Batting Performance	Rodney Ontong (100 Runs for Glamorgan against Northamptonshire) in 1982
Best Bowling Performance	Jack Birkenshaw (3/17 for Worcestershire against Glamorgan) in 1981
