= Priory Church of St Mary, Abergavenny =

Priory Church of St Mary
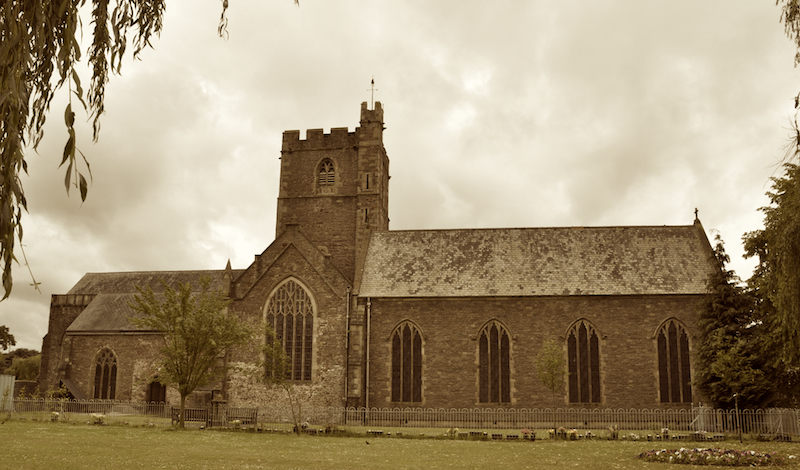
- Priory Church of St Mary
- Priory Church of St Mary
- 51.8214°N 3.0154°W
- Location: Abergavenny, Monmouthshire
- Country: Wales
- Denomination: Church in Wales
- Website: www.abergavenny.church

History
- Status: Parish church
- Founder: Hamelin de Ballon

Architecture
- Functional status: Active
- Heritage designation: Grade I
- Designated: 11 July 1952

Administration
- Province: Wales
- Diocese: Diocese of Monmouth
- Archdeaconry: Monmouth
- Deanery: Abergavenny
- Parish: Abergavenny

Clergy
- Archbishop: Archbishop of Wales
- Bishop(s): Cherry Vann, Bishop of Monmouth
- Vicar: Revd Lea Ryder

The Priory Church of St Mary, Abergavenny is a parish church in the centre of Abergavenny in Monmouthshire, Wales.

St. Mary's has been called "the Westminster Abbey of Wales" because of its large size, and the numerous high-status tomb monuments and medieval effigies surviving within it. The church was designated as a Grade I listed building on 1 July 1952.

== History ==
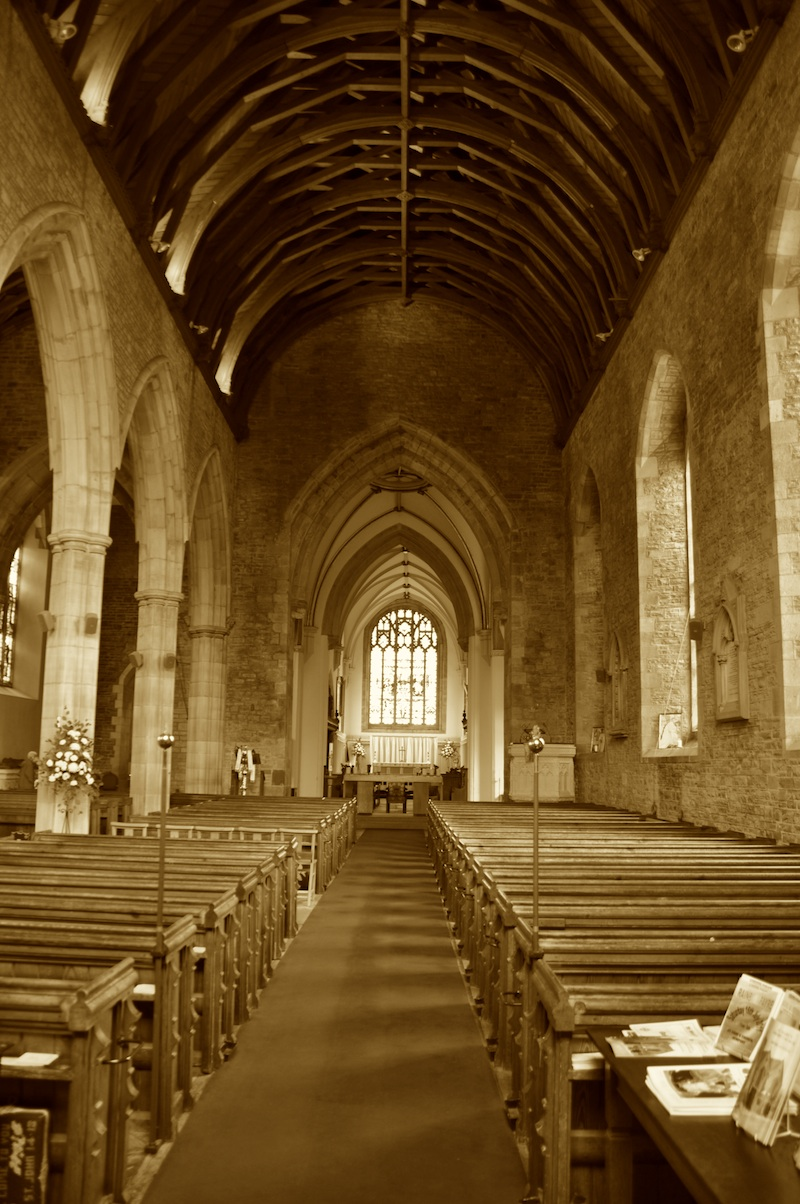
The nave, looking east.

Although the Norman building was built around 1070, a previous Iron Age, Roman or Post-Roman structure existed on the site. Archaeological surveys have found significant finds of Samian ware pottery, and a church named "The church of the Holy Rood" is known to have existed in the town, but its exact location is not known.

The current structure was originally the church of the Benedictine Priory, established under Hamelin de Balun the first Norman holder of the title Lord Abergavenny, which in the 1090s became Baron Bergavenny. At this time it was a cell of the Abbey of Saint Vincent at Le Mans in France. Henry de Abergavenny was a prior here and later at Llandaff in the late 12th century and was chosen to assist at the coronation of King John I of England in 1199. Successive Lords of Abergavenny were by necessity also benefactors, including William de Braose, 4th Lord of Bramber. In 1320 John Hastings, 2nd Baron Hastings, called on the Pope to set up an investigation into the Priory, in which the monks were accused of failing to maintain the Benedictine Rule. The prior, Fulk Gaston, absconded to the mother Abbey with the church silver.

By the time of the Dissolution of the Monasteries the Priory had only the prior and four monks. Due to the close connections between the Lords of Abergavenny and the Tudor dynasty the priory was spared and became the parish church.

== Description ==
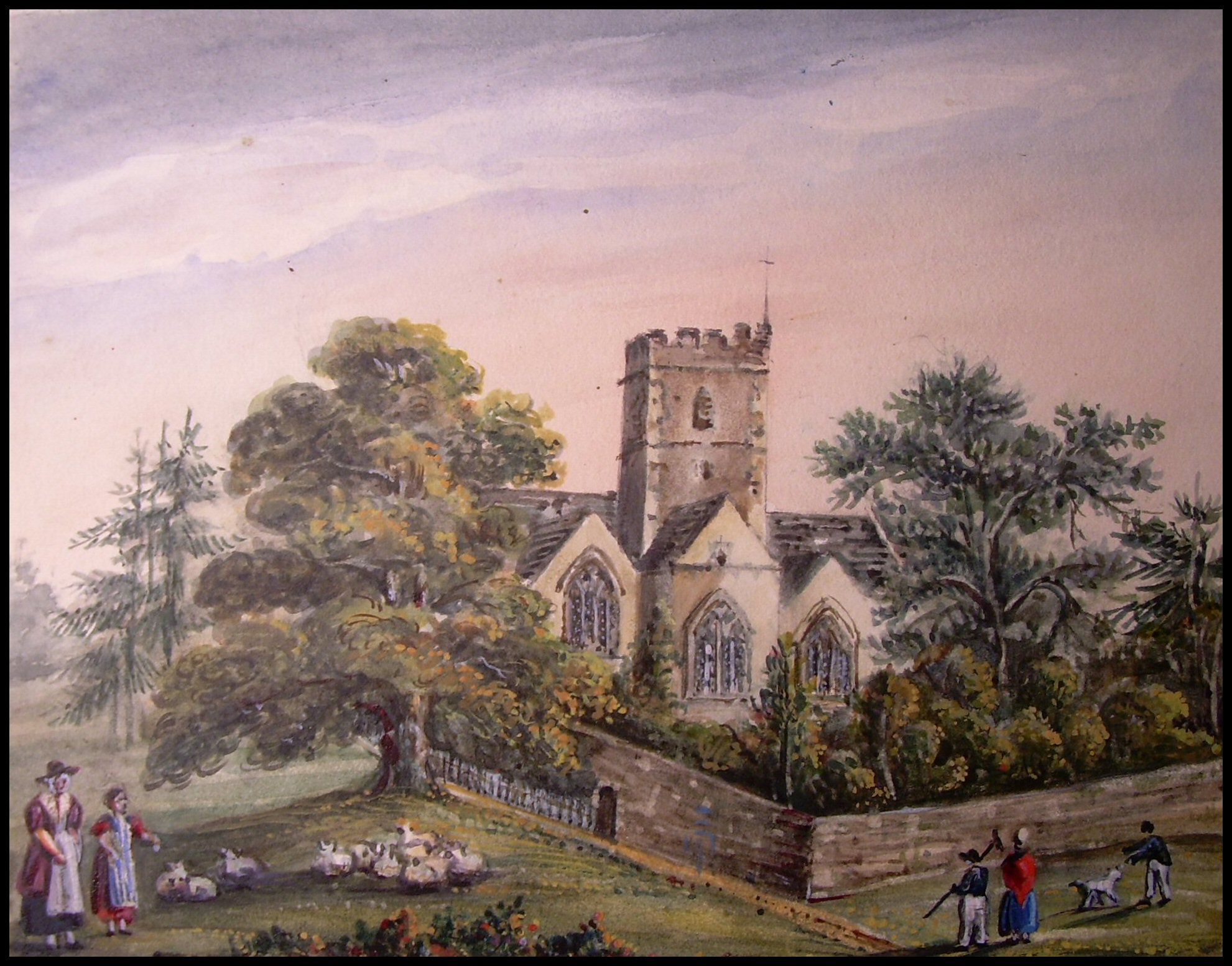
Abergavenny Church from the Priory Mead, October 1837 (watercolour)

The church is cruciform in layout and impressively large with a chancel and nave 172 feet (52 m) in length. The central tower has ten bells.

The church is mainly in the Decorated and Perpendicular Period architectural styles and was, like many churches, subjected to Victorian period refurbishment in the 19th century, with sadly little trace of the original Norman architecture surviving. The Norman baptismal font was rediscovered in the churchyard in the 19th century; it had been removed from the church in the 17th century by a local Baptist minister, John Abbot, on the grounds that he did not believe in infant baptism.

The oaken choir stalls with carved misericords and carved lattice work backs, however, are 15th-century survivals. They bear the name of the prior at that time Wynchestre and his own stall remains, slightly raised and surmounted by a mitre.

== Effigies ==
The church has a notable collection of memorial effigies. The effigies are in wood, alabaster and marble and range in date from the 13th century to the 17th century. One effigy is that of John de Hastings, Lord of Abergavenny (died 1324) and shows him as a young knight, wearing a long surcoat over a hauberk and a hood of fine chainmail.

== Lewis Chapel or Joseph Chapel ==
The chapel is named after Dr David Lewis, first Principal of Jesus College, Oxford, whose tomb it contains. In the chapel are two female effigies. One holds a heart in her palm, a device used to signify a possible heart burial, and dates from the end of the 13th century: she is believed to be Eva de Braose and, unusually for a female effigy, bears a shield bearing the Cantilupe arms. Her neighbour, a second female effigy, dates from the 14th century, and is purported to represent a member of the Hastings family who died while pursuing her pet red squirrel when it escaped and ran along the castle walls at Abergavenny Castle, causing her to fall to her death. The effigy has a light chain around her waist which was documented as having once been attached to a small squirrel that formed part of the effigy. It has since been knocked off or defaced, perhaps during the Commonwealth or Protectorate period (1649–1660). The chapel was dedicated to Saint Joseph, the husband of the Blessed Virgin Mary, by Bishop Richard Pain in November 2017.

== Herbert or Benedict Chapel ==
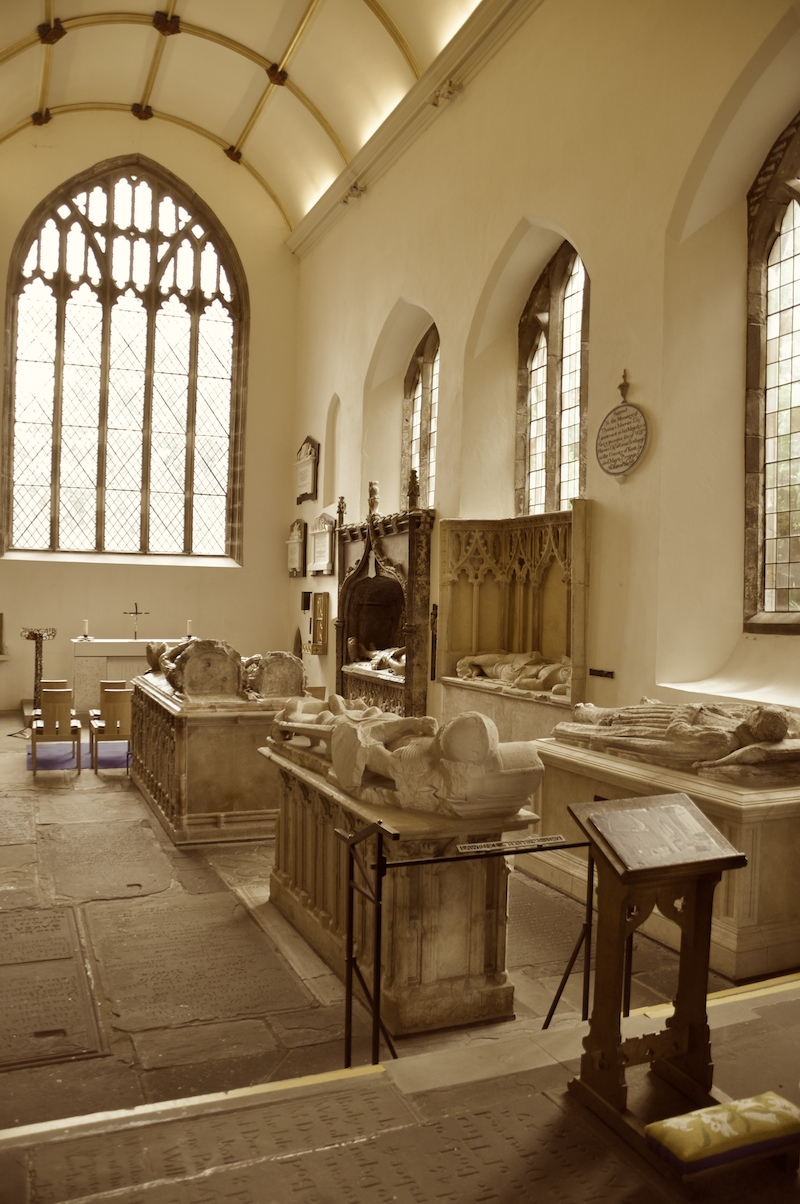
Tombs with effigies in the Herbert Chapel

The Herbert Chapel contains recumbent monuments and effigies, in both alabaster and marble, associated with the ap Thomas and Herbert families. These include Sir Richard Herbert of Coldbrook, executed with his elder brother William, Earl of Pembroke after the Battle of Edgecote in 1469 and William's illegitimate son Richard Herbert of Ewyas. The latter was brought up with Pembroke's ward Henry Tudor, later Henry VII, and fought on his side at Bosworth in 1485.

Within the chapel are also monumental brasses dating from the 16th and 17th centuries.

In 2018, the chapel was dedicated to St Benedict whose rule the Priory monks followed.

== Burials in the Priory ==
- William ap Thomas and his 2nd wife Gwladys ferch Dafydd Gam
- John Hastings, 2nd Baron Hastings
- Laurence Hastings, 1st Earl of Pembroke
- Richard Herbert of Coldbrook and his wife Margaret Verch Thomas (sister of Sir Rhys ap Thomas)
- Sir Richard Herbert (died 1510)

== The Jesse ==
The Jesse is an elaborate, very large, 15th-century wooden carving that would have once been part of an even larger carving forming a Jesse Tree telling the lineage of Jesus Christ based on that in the Bible. It is unique in Britain and described by Tate Britain as one of the finest medieval sculptures in the world. The art historian Andrew Graham-Dixon called it the one “unarguably great wooden figure” remaining from the Middle Ages. In 2016 a new stained-glass Jesse window designed by Helen Whittaker was installed in the Lewis Chapel, incorporating the wooden Jesse at its foot. The project was visited in April 2016 by the Archbishop of York, the Most Revd John Sentamu; and the completed work was dedicated in the presence of Charles, Prince of Wales, on 7 July 2016. The Jesse effigy was placed on a newly designed plinth in position below the Jesse Window in 2017.

== Organ ==
Around 1830 a secondhand organ, built by John Byfield in 1760 for the Lord Mayor's Chapel in Bristol, was sold to Mr. H. Smith and moved to the church. It stood in the gallery of the church, but was moved down when the church was being restored. It had two and a half manuals, the half being the swell organ. The restoration committee decided not to sell the old instrument but to have it enlarged, and in 1883, they contracted with Conacher and Co who enlarged it to three manuals and 27 speaking stops. It was re-opened on 21 February 1884, the festivities including a recital by the newly appointed organist, Throne Biggs, late deputy organist of Lichfield Cathedral. A specification of the organ can be found on the National Pipe Organ Register. It was moved from its original position in the north aisle to the north chancel around 1910.

The organ was rebuilt again in 1981 by E. A. Cawston but in 1998 the floor of the church beneath it subsided, and was dismantled and removed. The full cost of restoration initially prevented its return, but unfortunately the building in which it was stored leaked, and all the wooden elements (Casework, console, wind-chests and wooden pipes rotted and had to be destroyed. As a result, the cost of replacing it became prohibitive and the decision was taken to install a 2-manual Viscount digital organ, subsequently replaced by a three manual instrument that remains in use to the present day.

A small 5 stop, one manual chamber pipe organ, originally from St Nicholas' Church, Durham has been in use for small-scale services since 2015. One rank of pipes from the old organ (4' Gemshorn) has been incorporated into this instrument.

=== Organists ===
- Edward Howells, 1830–1855
- Francis Marshall Ward, 1855–1857 (afterwards organist of St Mary's Church, Lincoln).
- Ernest Thomas Bennett Gilbert, 1857–1859 (formerly organist of St Paul's Church, Newport)
- Jonathan Macrone, 1859–1860 (formerly organist of St Mary's Church, Cardiff)
- Mr. Crown, 1860–1861
- Jonathan Macrone, 1861 (reappointed)
- Mr. Doorly, 1861–????
- Charles Isaac Howells ???? – 1883
- Thomas Throne Crick Biggs, 1883–1894
- William Robert Carr, 1894–1933
- J. E. Hughes 1933–????
- Graham Elliott
- John Eden, 1994–2002 (1994–2000 DofM)
- Tim Pratt, 2001–current

== Bells ==
When the parishioners took ownership of the church around 1536–39, they bought the existing four bells, weighing a total of 45.5 long hundredweight (2,310 kg). Three bells were re-cast in the 17th and early 18th centuries. The tenor in 1603 and the 3rd in 1666, by Purdues of Bristol, and the treble in 1706 by Abraham Rudall. The bells were augmented to five in 1835 and then to six in 1845 by Jeffries & Price of Bristol.

To commemorate the Golden Jubilee of Queen Victoria in 1887, the bells were rehung and augmented to eight by Llewellins & James of Bristol. The tenor of 19 long hundredweight (970 kg) was recast by Llewellins & James in 1893.

All the bells were recast in 1947 by John Taylor & Co of Loughborough and the ring augmented to 10 bells. The new tenor now weighs 25 long hundredweight (1,300 kg).

== The Church today ==
The restored Tithe Barn within the precincts of the Priory, was opened by HRH Charles, Prince of Wales on 23 October 2008 and houses the large 24 feet (7.3 m) tapestry depicting the history of Abergavenny and embroidered by volunteers to mark the 2000 Millennium. It is now the Priory's Heritage Centre and offers interpretative information open to the public and visitors.

After 18 years as vicar canon, Jeremy Winston was appointed Dean of Monmouth. Fr Mark Soady, former Chaplain at the University of Wales, Newport was collated as vicar on the Feast of the Epiphany 2012. Fr Mark was made Prior in September 2014 and installed as a Canon of Newport Cathedral in November 2014.Fr Mark left the Priory in March 2020.

After a nearly five hundred-year gap a new Monastic Community – the Holywell Community – was established on 2 September 2014.

== Gallery ==
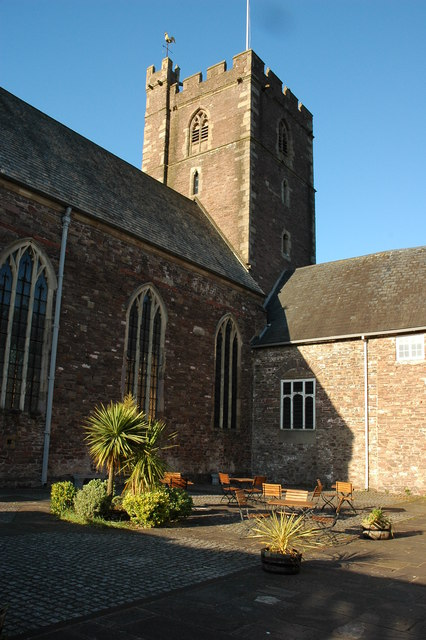
The tower

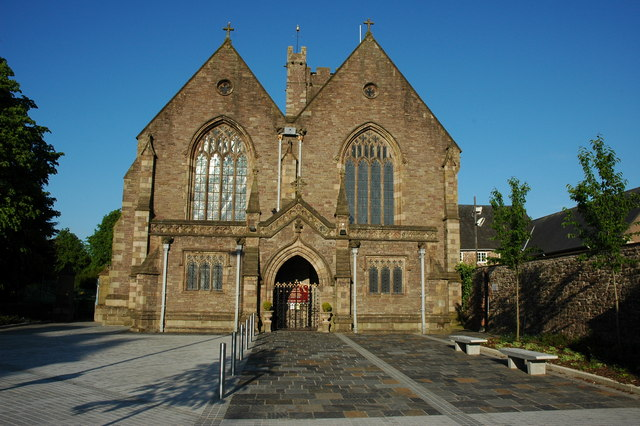
West front

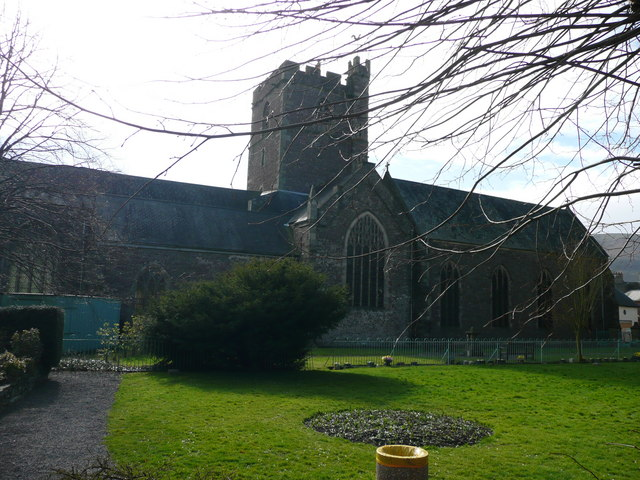
From the North

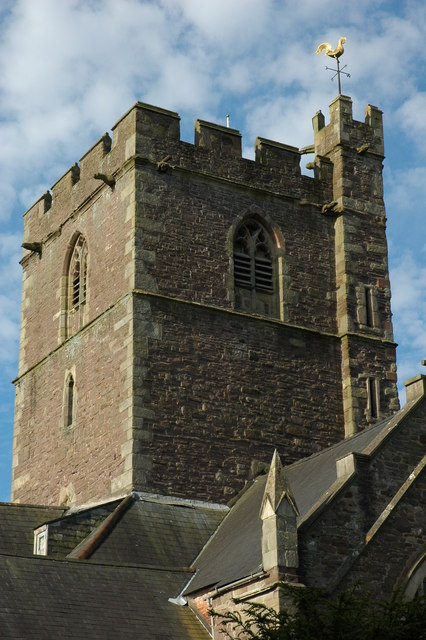
Tower detail
