= Y Graig =

Coordinates: 51.841°N 3.083°W

Y Graig, three miles west of Abergavenny, is the site of an abandoned settlement, known to have been occupied in the 18th and 19th centuries. It is a scheduled monument in the care of Cadw.

== See also ==
- Sugar Loaf, Monmouthshire
