= Linda Vista Gardens =

Urban park in Abergavenny, Wales

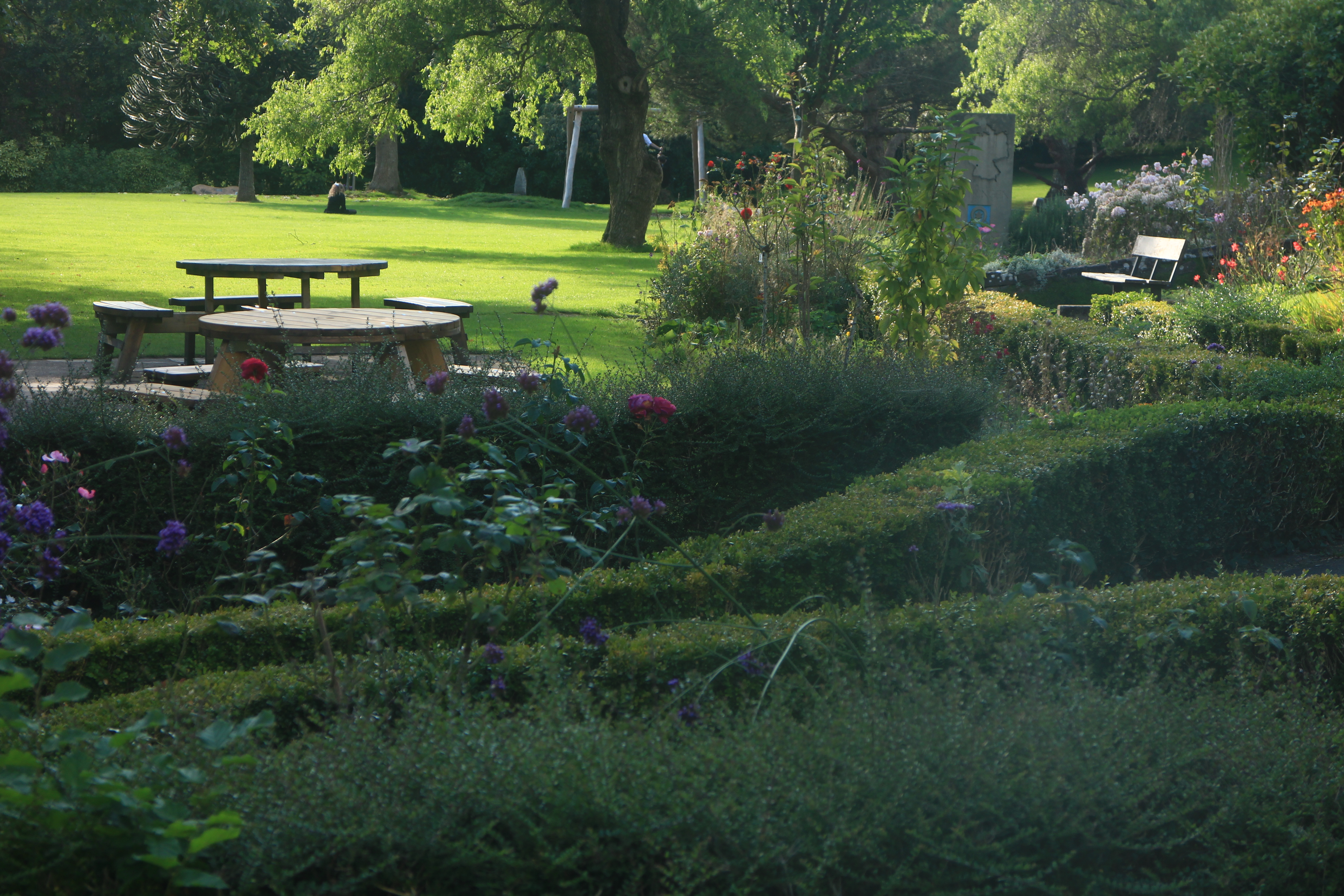
- The gardens in autumn

- Location within Monmouthshire
- Type: Public park
- Location: Abergavenny, Monmouthshire, Wales
- Coordinates: 51.8210°N 3.0237°W
- Created: 1957-1964
- Operator: Monmouthshire County Council
- Status: Open year round
- Website

Cadw/ICOMOS Register of Parks and Gardens of Special Historic Interest in Wales
- Official name: Linda Vista Gardens
- Designated: 1 February 2022
- Reference no.: PGW(Gt)59(MON)
- Listing: Grade II

Listed Building – Grade II
- Official name: Telephone Call-box close to entrance to Linda Vista Gardens
- Designated: 3 November 1988
- Reference no.: 2801

Linda Vista Gardens is a small urban park in the town of Abergavenny, Monmouthshire Wales. Originally the garden of a private house, the gardens came into public ownership in 1957, and were later extended as a public park. Linda Vista Gardens are registered Grade II on the Register of Parks and Gardens of Special Historic Interest in Wales. A K6 telephone box at the entrance to the gardens is listed also at Grade II. The park is managed by Monmouthshire County Council.

== History and description ==
Linda Vista House was built as a private home in 1875. Its owner, Henry Jenkins, was born in Abergavenny, and subsequently made his fortune in the construction industry in Chile. Returning to his hometown, he built his villa and laid out the gardens, which lay mainly to the south of the house. In 1957, the gardens came into public ownership. They were subsequently extended, including land at Castle Meadows, and an extensive replanting was undertaken.

The park includes a number of specimen trees, including a Ginkgo biloba. Parks & Gardens UK records the "exceptional quality and variety of the planting". Linda Vista Gardens are listed at Grade II on the Register of Parks and Gardens of Special Historic Interest in Wales.

A volunteer group, the Friends of Linda Vista Gardens, exists to preserve and improve the park.

== Gallery ==
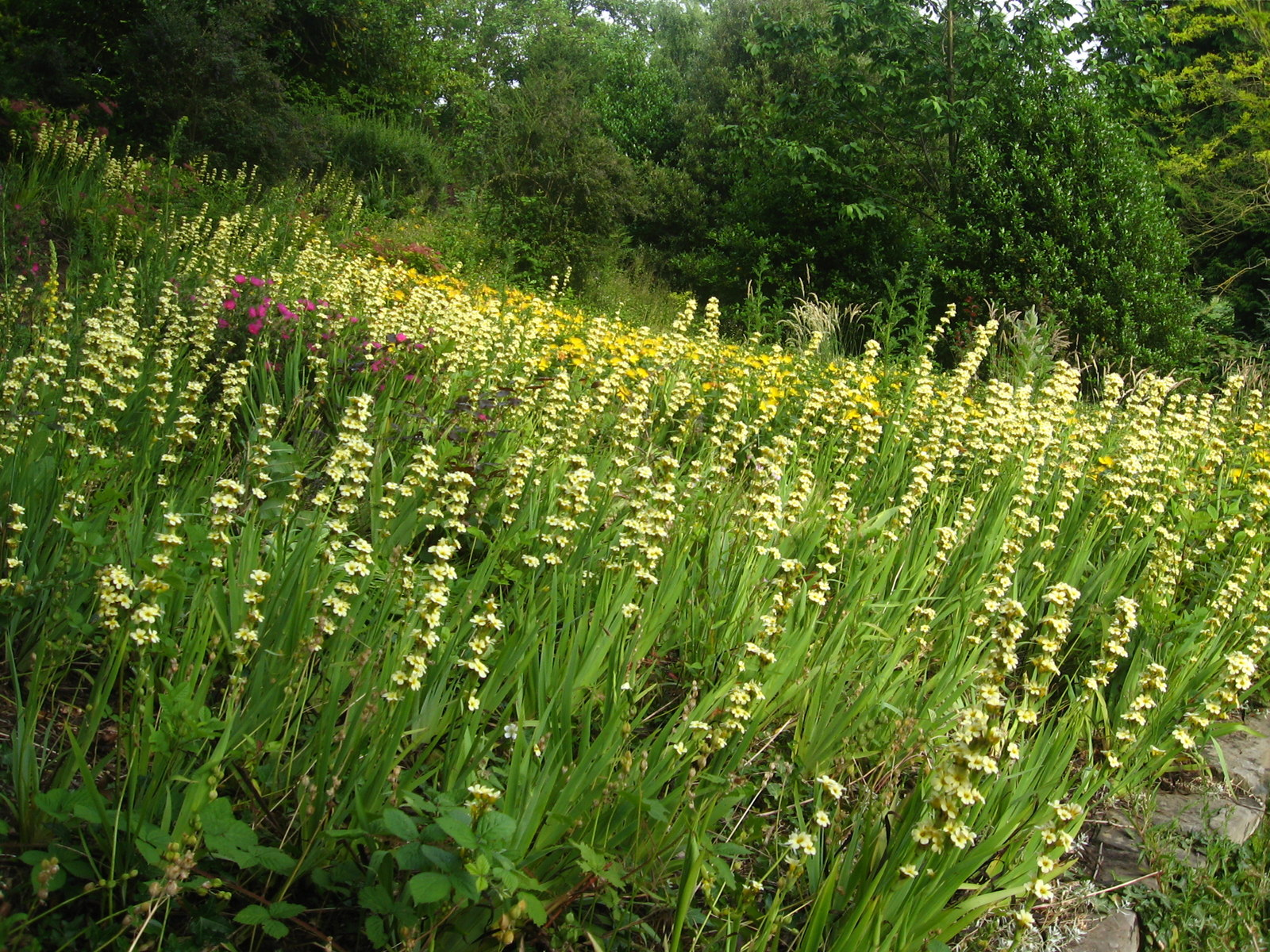
Meadow in the gardens

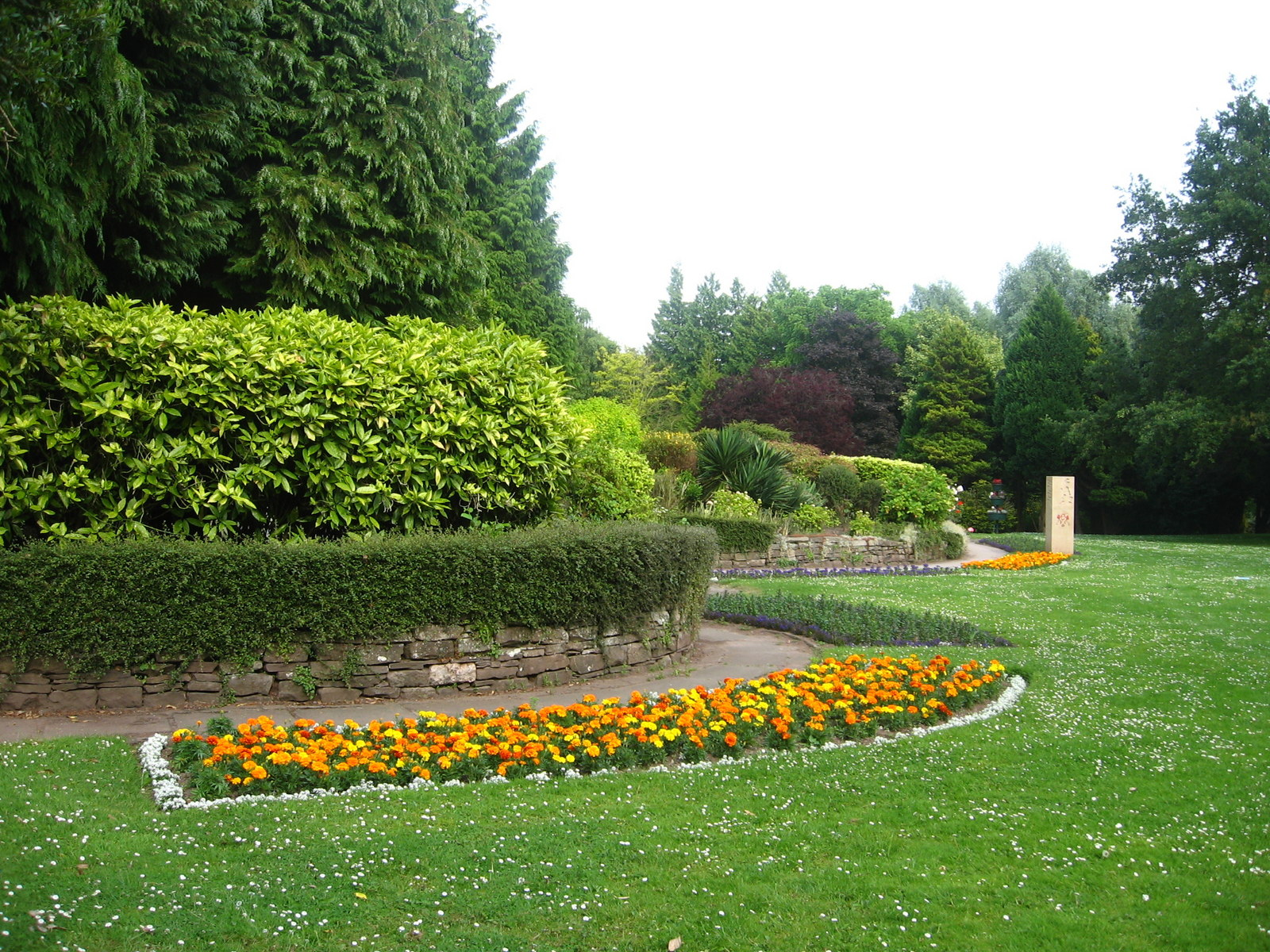
Municipal planting

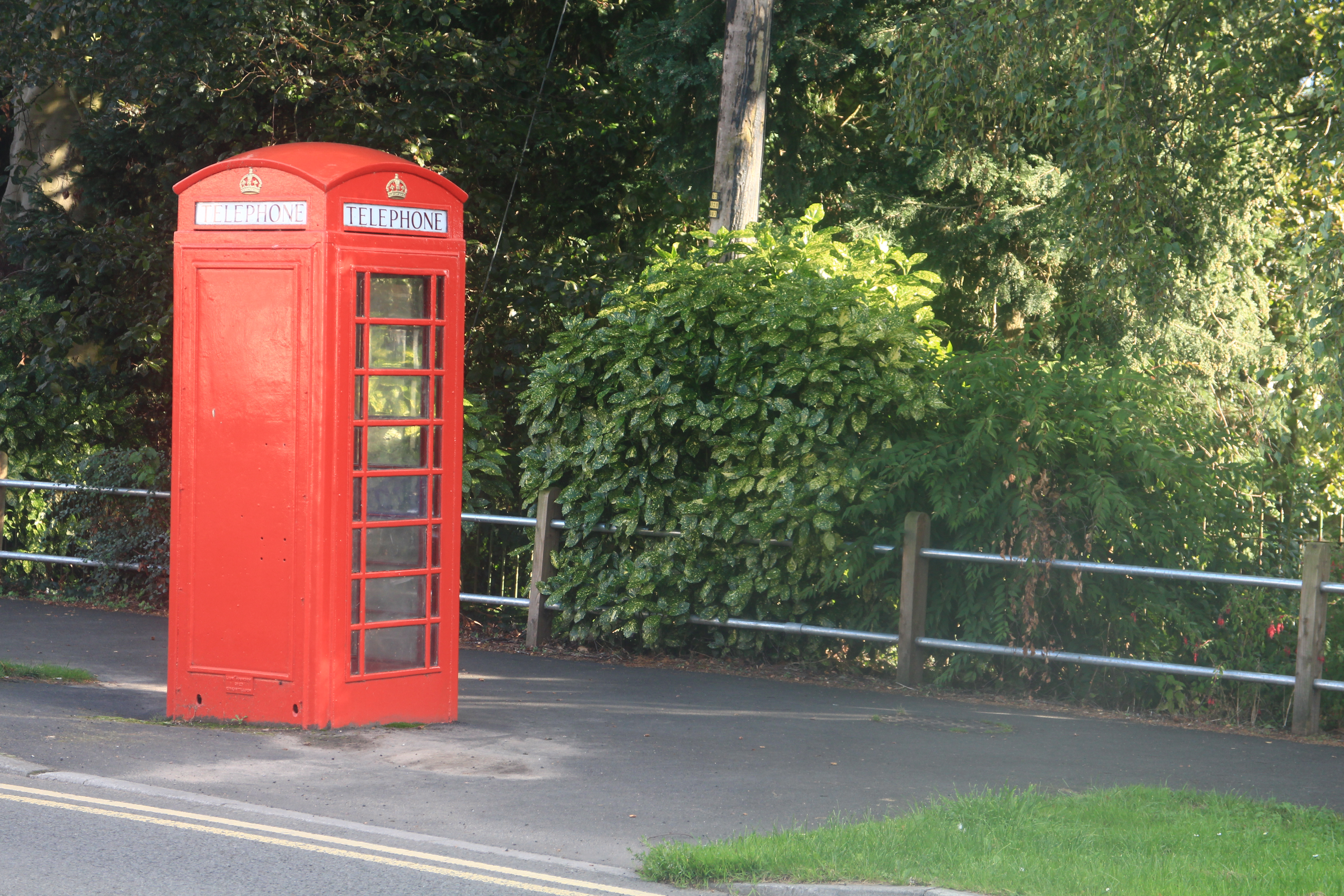
Listed telephone box at the garden entrance
