= The Tithe Barn, Abergavenny =

The Tithe Barn
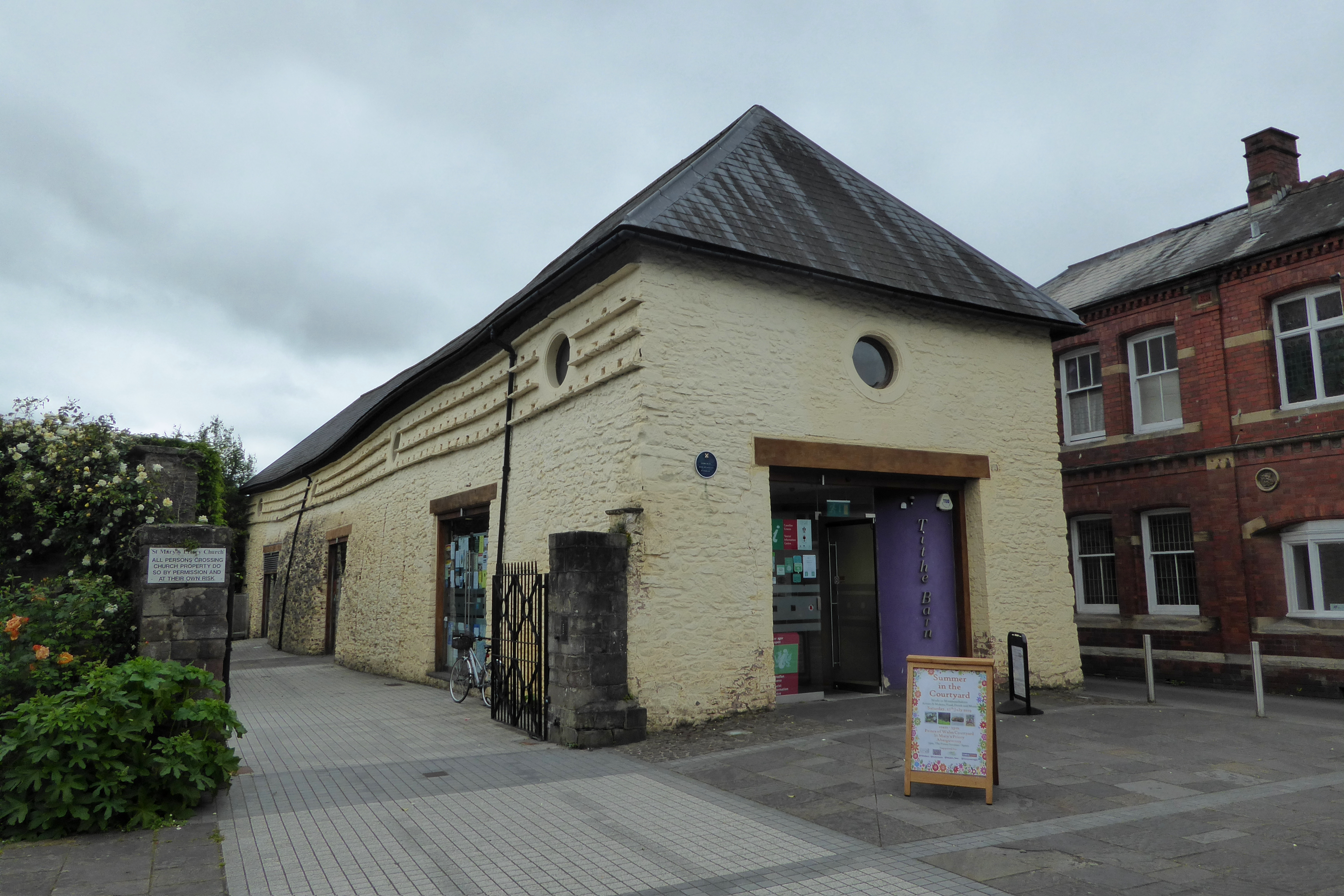

- Location within Monmouthshire
- 51.8212°N 3.0162°W
- Type: Barn
- Location: Abergavenny, Monmouthshire

History
- Built: C.16th century

Site notes
- Governing body: Priory Church of St Mary, Abergavenny

Listed Building – Grade II*
- Official name: The Tithe Barn
- Designated: 7 May 1952
- Reference no.: 2375

The Tithe Barn, Monk Street, Abergavenny, Monmouthshire is a tithe barn of late medieval origins which forms part of a group of historic buildings in the centre of the town. It is a Grade II* listed building.

== History ==
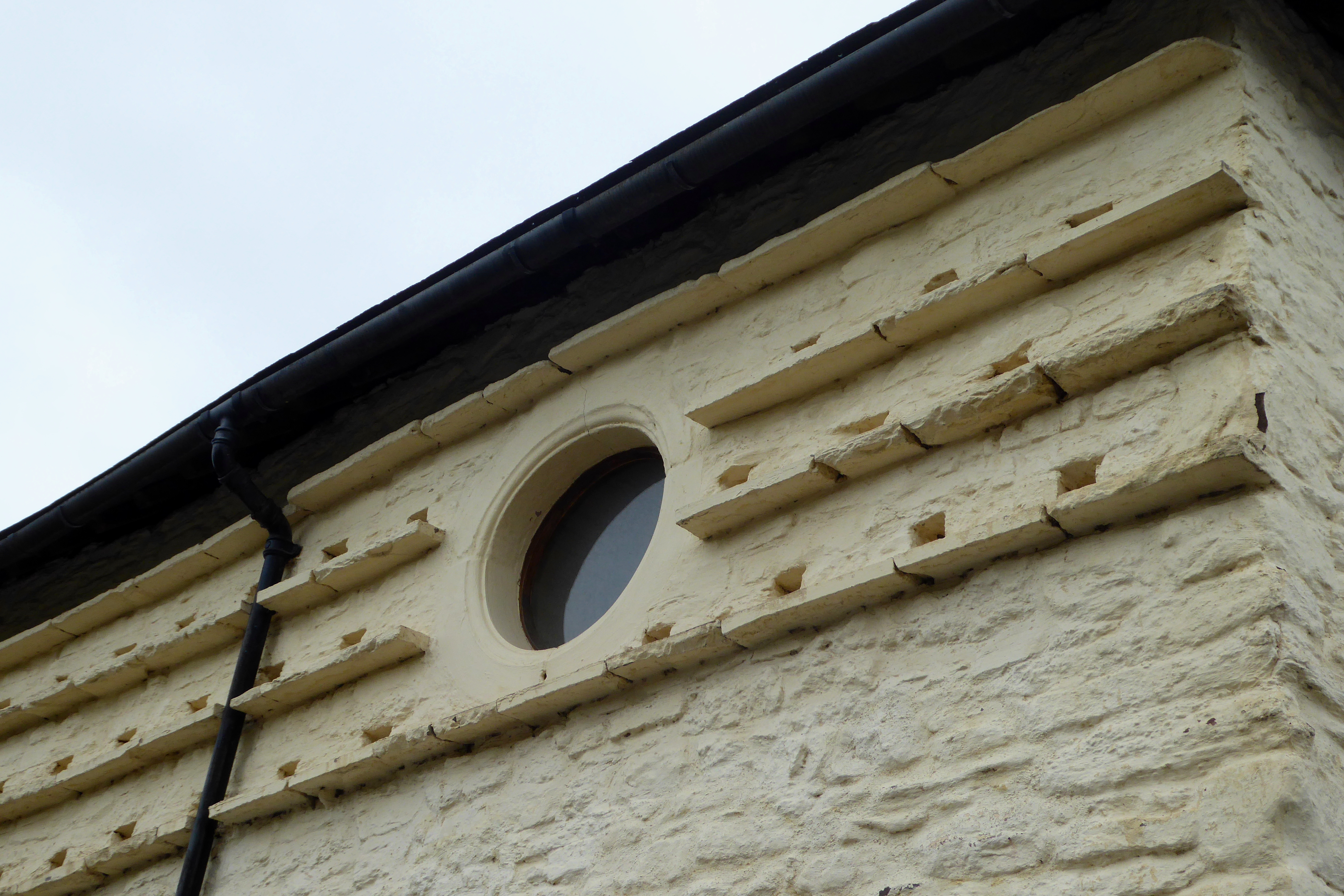
External detail on the tithe barn

The barn is of late-medieval origin, with a likely construction date in the 16th century. The building was constructed for the storage of tithes payable to the church authorities of the Priory Church of St Mary. Following the Dissolution of the Monasteries in the 16th century, the barn was used for a variety of functions, including a theatre in the 17th century and a discotheque in the 20th century. By 2002, the barn was in a state of considerable dilapidation and was again taken into the ownership of the Priory Church, which following a major reconstruction, operates an exhibition space in the building.

== Architecture and description ==
The barn is constructed of whitewashed sandstone rubble, with walls that are now significantly out of true. The architectural historian John Newman describes their present appearance as "waveringly deformed, but originally must have been quite a showpiece." The barn is of seven bays, and the original three cart-entrances have been blocked. The eaves of the roof have lines of pigeon-holes with perching ledges.
