= Abergavenny Museum =

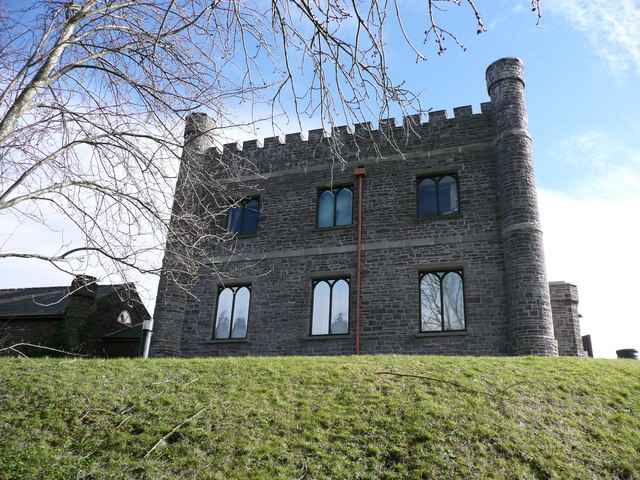
- Abergavenny Castle 19th century hunting lodge 'keep', home to Abergavenny Museum

- Location within Monmouthshire
- Location: Abergavenny, Monmouthshire, Wales
- Coordinates: 51.820182°N 3.017485°W
- Type: Local museum
- Website: Abergavenny Museum

Abergavenny Museum is a museum situated in the grounds of Abergavenny Castle, Abergavenny, Monmouthshire, south east Wales.

The museum is housed in the square 'keep' on the high point of the castle motte, in the hunting lodge built for the Marquess of Abergavenny in 1819 on the site. The castle grounds overlook the River Usk and Castle Meadows and is in Abergavenny town centre itself.

== History of the museum ==
The museum had been mooted early in the 20th century but action to establish it only took place in the late 1950s at a period when parts of the old town of Abergavenny were undergoing some redevelopment and some interesting historical and archaeological artifacts came to light. Local residents realised that some action had to be taken to prevent these items from being lost forever and to provide a home for future finds. The action of local volunteers established the museum on its present site.

== The collection ==
The museum houses a collection of objects of local significance: old photographs of the landscape and town; archaeological finds discovered when the new 1960s Post Office and telephone exchange was built on part of the site of the Roman fort of Gobannium; earlier prehistoric finds dating from the Mesolithic, Bronze Age and Iron Age such as axe heads and arrow heads; items from the medieval and Tudor periods; a Welsh kitchen of the 1890s, a saddlers shop from 1900 to 1930 and Basil Jones' old grocers shop from Abergavenny town; and nationally valuable collections associated with Father Ignatius and Lady Llanover.

== Liaison with schools ==
Abergavenny Museum works closely with local schools and educational establishments. It provides a range of workshops covering the Celts and Romans locally to the Victorian kitchen.

== See also ==
- Conservation in the United Kingdom
- List of museums in Wales
