= The Skirrid Inn =

Pub in Llanvihangel Crucorney, Wales

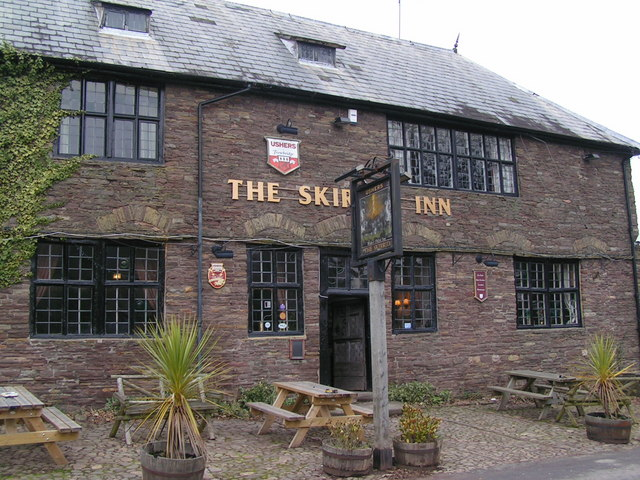

- Location within Monmouthshire

General information
- Location: Llanfihangel Crucorney, Monmouthshire, Wales, United Kingdom
- Coordinates: 51°52′49″N 2°58′50″W

The Skirrid Inn, also called the Skirrid Mountain Inn is a public house in the small village of Llanvihangel Crucorney, approximately 4 miles (6 km) north of Abergavenny, Monmouthshire, Wales.

== Claims to fame ==
The inn is one of a number of pubs claiming to be the oldest in Wales. Work undertaken by the Glamorgan-Gwent Archaeological Trust has concluded that the present building is of mainly mid-late 17th century construction. However, Forde presents the theory that an inn had stood on the site previously, due to it being situated upon a pilgrim trail that led to Llanthony Priory; although there is no evidence to verify this.

A popular, although equally unverified, legend is that the inn was used as a rallying point for local supporters of the Glyndŵr Rising against the rule of Henry IV, the uprising being led by Owain Glyndŵr. He is said to have personally rallied his troops in the cobbled courtyard before raiding nearby settlements sympathetic to the English in the 15th century.

Another undocumented claim to fame is that the first floor of the inn was reputedly used as a Court of Law where capital punishment was imposed for certain offences, including sheep stealing. Legend has it that as many as 180 criminals were adjudged guilty of crimes serious enough to warrant the sentence of death by hanging, a sentence that was allegedly carried out at the inn itself, from an oak beam over the well of the staircase. Markings, said to be from rope marks, still exist on the staircase wood.

The inn has, largely based on these unverified and undocumented stories, gained a reputation for being haunted by several ghosts or spirits and has been said to be the scene of numerous supernatural occurrences or paranormal activities. The inn was featured in series one of the television show Extreme Ghost Stories, and series two of Most Haunted with Yvette Fielding.

== Attractions ==
The inn looks out onto the Skirrid Mountain to the east and the Black Mountains to the west, part of the Brecon Beacons National Park. The Offa's Dyke Path also runs close by.

== Gallery ==
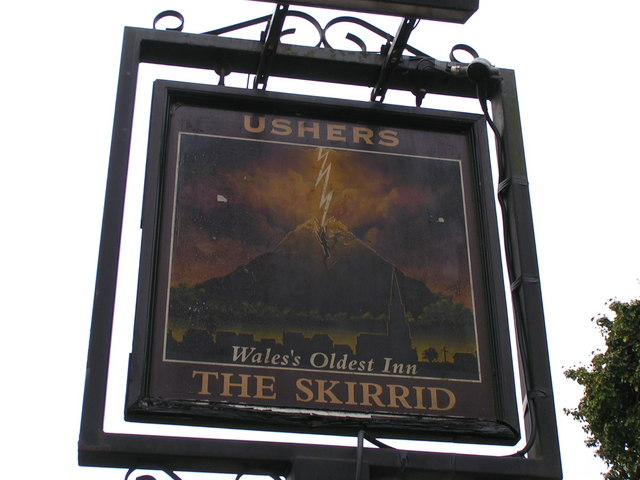
Sign

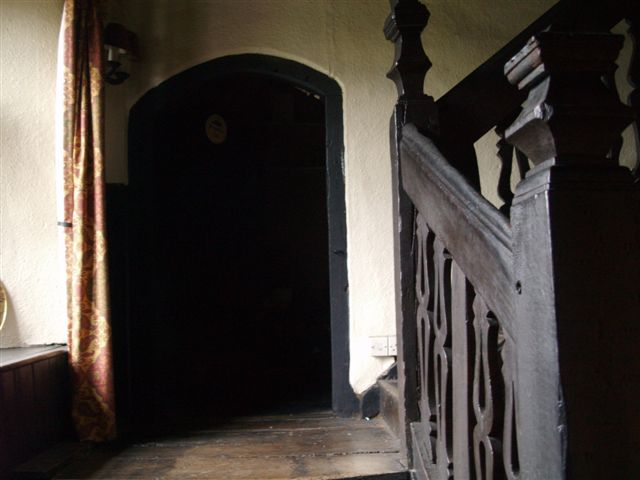
Prisoner's cell

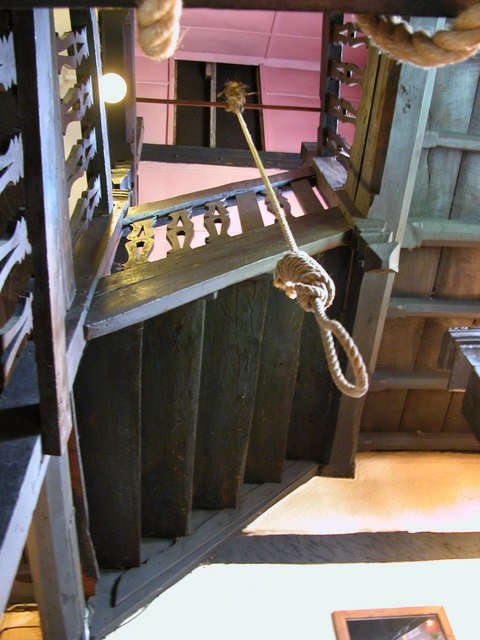
Hangman's rope
