= Extreme Ghost Stories =

British television series

Extreme Ghost Stories is a British supernatural documentary television series produced by ITV Granada, consisting of four one hour episodes.

== Origin and notes ==
In 2005, ITV Granada appealed for those whose lives had been affected by ghostly experiences to contact the station regarding production of a paranormal series. The series was broadcast by ITV in 2006, and was later shown on American cable channel WE tv in September 2007. The series features drama reconstructions of ghostly encounters of some well-known haunted locations as well as individual cases not known to paranormal enthusiasts. It is narrated by Rob Brown.

A recurring supernatural entity in the series is the black mass, a dark form with a vaguely humanoid stance, which witnesses feel represents evil.

The series features contributions from resident Most Haunted Live! historian and Most Haunted: Midsummer Murders presenter Lesley Smith, writers Clive Hopwood and Jan-Andrew Henderson, and late Angel Radio DJ Ed Paine.

== Episodes ==
Episode	Cases	Air Date
1	The Skirrid Mountain Inn; Enfield Poltergeist; Maes Artro heritage museum, Snowdonia; Haunted nursery Kirklands Crescent, Kilsyth	2006 (ITV); 8 Sept 2007 (WE tv)
2	Michelham Priory; Victorian mansion, Ryde; Naworth level crossing Plas Teg; Swindon railway works	2006 (ITV); 15 Sept 2007 (WE tv)
3	Theatre Royal, Drury Lane; The Mackenzie Poltergeist; Fishing trawler Tutbury Castle; Victoria Avenue, Hastings	2006 (ITV); 22 Sept 2007 (WE tv)
4	Haunted mansion, Penwith; Fobbing poltergeist The First and Last Inn, Land's End; Freemans catalogue HQ, South London; Bodilly Manor, Cornwall	2006 (ITV); 29 Sept 2007 (WE tv)

== See also ==
- List of ghost films
