= Borough Theatre =

Theatre in Abergavenny, Wales (built 1870)

Coordinates: 51.821950°N 3.018124°W

The Borough Theatre, Abergavenny is the principal theatre in the Monmouthshire town of Abergavenny in south east Wales.

== Location, history and amenities ==
The theatre is part of the Victorian era town hall building dating from 1870 and is situated on Cross Street in the town centre. Its intimate auditorium affords excellent sightlines and acoustics, which succeeds in blending historic and traditional features with a modern ambience. The theatre was extensively renovated in the 1990s and again in 2022.

The Beatles played at the Borough Theatre Abergavenny on Saturday 22 June 1963.

The Borough Theatre is a performance base for the Abergavenny Amateur Operatic & Dramatic Society (AAODS). It hosts an active programme of drama, music and other arts, attracting a wide variety of touring artistes.
