= Abergavenny town walls =

- Abergavenny, Monmouthshire, Wales
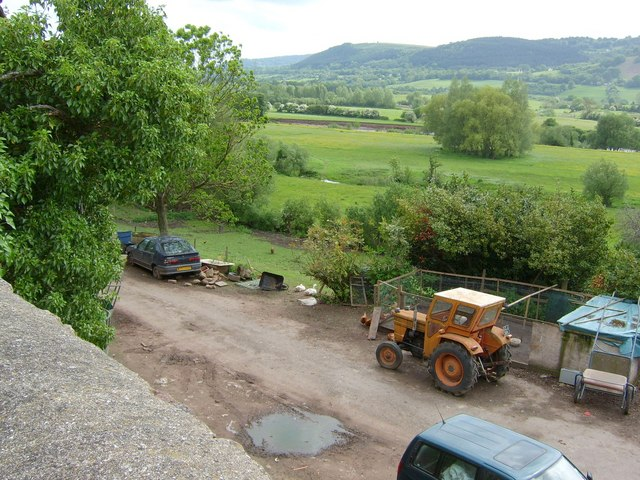
- View from the remains of Abergavenny's town wall

Site information
- Type: City wall

Location
- Shown within Wales
- Coordinates: 51°49′17″N 3°00′56″W grid reference SO299141

Abergavenny's town walls are a sequence of defensive walls built around the town of Abergavenny in Monmouthshire, Wales.

== History ==
After the Norman invasion of Wales in the 11th century, a castle was built at Abergavenny; this included a relatively small, walled town. This town had a rectangle of wooden walls, protected by a V-shaped ditch, stopping just short of the modern Cross Street. In the 12th century this ditch was filled in, possibly because of a pressure on land in the town, and the town of Abergavenny then appears to have lacked any defences until the late 13th century.

In the late 13th century a larger town wall was built around Abergavenny in stone, forming an oval shape, approximately 350 m by 215 m across. The wall was paid for and maintained by murage, by which the king allowed a city to raise taxes on the imports of particular goods.

By the 21st century, only occasional masonry remains of the medieval walls, although the line of the wall can be seen in the form of later buildings and walls.

== See also ==
- List of town walls in England and Wales
- Chester city walls
- York city walls

== Bibliography ==
- Clarke, Stephen and Jane Bray. (2003) "The Norman town defences of Abergavenny," Medieval Archaeology Vol. 27, pp. 186–189.
- Creighton, Oliver Hamilton and Robert Higham. (2005) Medieval Town Walls: an Archaeology and Social History of Urban Defence. Stroud, UK: Tempus. ISBN 978-0-7524-1445-4.
