= Charles Farmer =

English cricketer and soldier

Personal information
- Full name: Charles George Edgar Farmer
- Born: 28 November 1885; Chelsea, Middlesex, England
- Died: 18 August 1916 (aged 30); Longueval, Somme, France
- Batting: Unknown
- Relatives: William Crawley (uncle); Arthur Farmer (uncle); Frederick Parker (son-in-law)

Domestic team information
- Years: Team
- 1905–1906: Marylebone Cricket Club

Career statistics
Competition	First-class
Matches	2
Runs scored	78
Batting average	26.00
100s/50s	–/1
Top score	55
Catches/stumpings	1/–
- Source: Cricinfo, 9 June 2021

Charles George Edgar Farmer (28 November 1885 – 18 August 1916) was an English first-class cricketer and British Army officer.

The son of Charles and Emily Farmer, he was born at Chelsea in November 1885. He was educated at Eton College, where he played for the college cricket team against Winchester and Harrow. From Eton he went up to New College, Oxford where he read chemistry. He was a member of the Oxford University Cricket Club, playing in trial matches, but did not progress to represent the club in first-class cricket. A Oxford he was elected a fellow of the Oxford Chemical Society. He became a member of the Marylebone Cricket Club (MCC) in 1905 and played two first-class matches for the club against Derbyshire in 1905, and Worcestershire in 1906. Against Worcestershire he made his highest first-class score of 55.

After graduating from Oxford he did not pursue a career in the chemical industry, instead changing to law and entered into the Inner Temple, before moving to Lincoln's Inn. He specialised in patent law and was involved in several important cases. Farmer joined the British Army to fight in the First World War, being commissioned as a second lieutenant in the King's Royal Rifle Corps, before being granted the temporary rank of lieutenant in December 1915. Farmer was killed in action on 18 August 1916 during the Battle of the Somme. He was survived by his wife, Mary Cicely Ewart, and their daughter, Pamela, who was born shortly before his death. His uncles, William Crawley and Arthur Farmer, both played first-class cricket. His future son-in-law Frederick Parker played county cricket for Hampshire.
