= Ysgyryd Fach =

Coordinates: 51.8176°N 2.9933°W

Ysgyryd Fach is a hill one mile east of Abergavenny in the county of Monmouthshire, south Wales. It is often referred to in English as Little Skirrid or sometimes as Skirrid Fach. Its summit height is just over 270 metres (890 ft). A conifer plantation extends over much of the hill including its summit; prior to felling of trees on the upper slopes in 2012 outward views were therefore restricted. The hill is considered to be one of the 'seven hills of Abergavenny'.

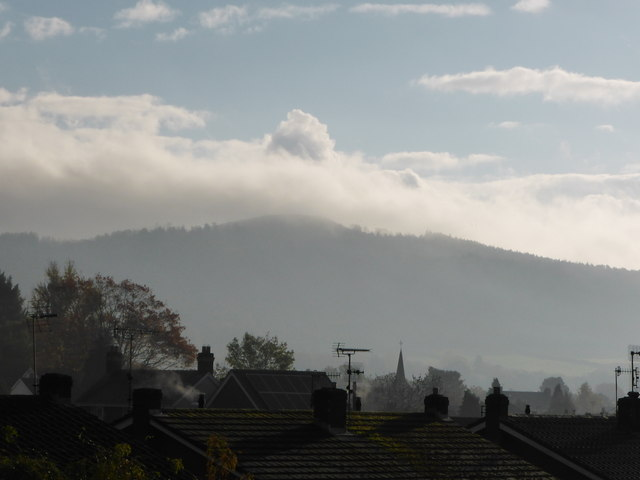
Ysgyryd Fach in autumn

== Geology ==
The hill is formed from mudstones of the St Maughans Formation of the Old Red Sandstone laid down in the Devonian period. Thin beds of calcrete, a thin limestone of terrestrial origin, occur on the hill; its very summit consists of sandstone from the Senni Formation (formerly referred to as the 'Senni Beds'). There are few rock exposures and the lower slopes are mantled by glacial till.

== Access ==
A public footpath runs east–west over the summit of the hill between the minor road to its east and Abergavenny Railway Station. A further path skirts the southern edge of the hill.
