= Arthur Farmer (cricketer) =

English cricketer and British Army officer

Personal information
- Full name: Arthur Augustus Farmer
- Born: 22 February 1815; London, England
- Died: 1 April 1897 (aged 82); Buffalo, New York, United States
- Batting: Unknown
- Bowling: Unknown
- Relatives: Charles Farmer (nephew)

Domestic team information
- Years: Team
- 1834–1836: Cambridge University
- 1839: Marylebone Cricket Club
- 1839: Surrey

Career statistics
Competition	First-class
Matches	10
Runs scored	37
Batting average	2.46
100s/50s	–/–
Top score	8*
Balls bowled	?
Wickets	25
Bowling average	?
5 wickets in innings	1
10 wickets in match	1
Best bowling	6/?
Catches/stumpings	8/–
- Source: Cricinfo, 20 April 2021

Arthur Augustus Farmer (22 February 1815 – 1 April 1897) was an English first-class cricketer and barrister.

The son of William Meeke Farmer, he was born at London in February 1815. He was educated at Winchester College, before going up to Caius College, Cambridge. While studying at Cambridge, he played first-class cricket for Cambridge University from 1834 to 1836, making seven appearances. A bowler, he took 25 wickets for Cambridge University, taking five wickets in an innings and ten wickets in a match once, against Oxford University in The University Match of 1836.

A student of the Inner Temple, he was called to the bar in June 1836. Farmer played further first-class matches following his graduation from Cambridge, playing once for Cambridge Town Club in 1838 against the Marylebone Cricket Club (MCC), before making an appearance each in 1839 for the MCC against a combined Oxford and Cambridge Universities team and for Surrey against the MCC. He later emigrated to Upper Canada where he married Louisa Emily de Blaquière, daughter of Peter de Blaquière. While in Canada he continued to play minor cricket matches for a variety of teams, including Canada itself. Farmer died in the United States at Buffalo in April 1897. His grandfather was the politician Samuel Farmer.
