= William Parker (MCC cricketer) =

English cricketer

Personal information
- Born: 1 September 1886; Belgaum, India
- Died: 30 July 1915 (aged 28); Hooge, Belgium
- Source: Cricinfo, 20 May 2016

William Parker (1 September 1886 – 30 July 1915) was an English cricketer. He played two first-class matches for Marylebone Cricket Club between 1913 and 1914. He was killed in action during World War I.

== See also ==
- List of cricketers who were killed during military service
