= Richard Crawley =

Welsh writer and academic (1840–1893)

- Born: 26 December 1840; Raglan
- Died: 30 March 1893

Richard Crawley (26 December 1840 – 30 March 1893) was a Welsh writer and academic, best known for his translation of Thucydides's History of the Peloponnesian War.

== Life ==
Crawley was born at a Bryngwyn rectory on 26 December 1840, the eldest son of William Crawley, Archdeacon of Monmouth, by his wife, Mary Gertrude, third daughter of Sir Love Jones Parry of Madryn, Carnarvonshire. From 1851 to 1861 he was at Marlborough College. He matriculated at University College, Oxford, as an exhibitioner on 22 May 1861, and graduated with a B.A. in 1866, having taken a first class both in moderations and in the school of Literae Humaniores. In 1866, he was elected to a fellowship at Worcester College, Oxford, which he held till 1880.

Called to the bar at Lincoln's Inn on 7 June 1869, Crawley never practised; in poor health, he lived abroad for many years. In April 1875, he became director of a life assurance company, and that business largely occupied him until his death on 30 March 1893.

== Works ==
In 1868 he published Horse and Foot, a satire on contemporary literary effort in the manner of Alexander Pope. Venus and Psyche and other Poems appeared in 1871. The Younger Brother, a play in the style of the Elizabethan drama, followed in 1878. Crawley contributed verse to conservative newspapers during the general election of 1880. These he collected in a volume called Election Rhymes in the same year. His most substantial work was a translation of Thucydides's History of the Peloponnesian War. The first book came out in 1866, and the whole was issued in 1874.
