= Abergavenny Castle =

Ruined castle in Abergavenny, Monmouthshire, Wales

Abergaveny Castle
- Abergaveny, Monmouthshire, Wales
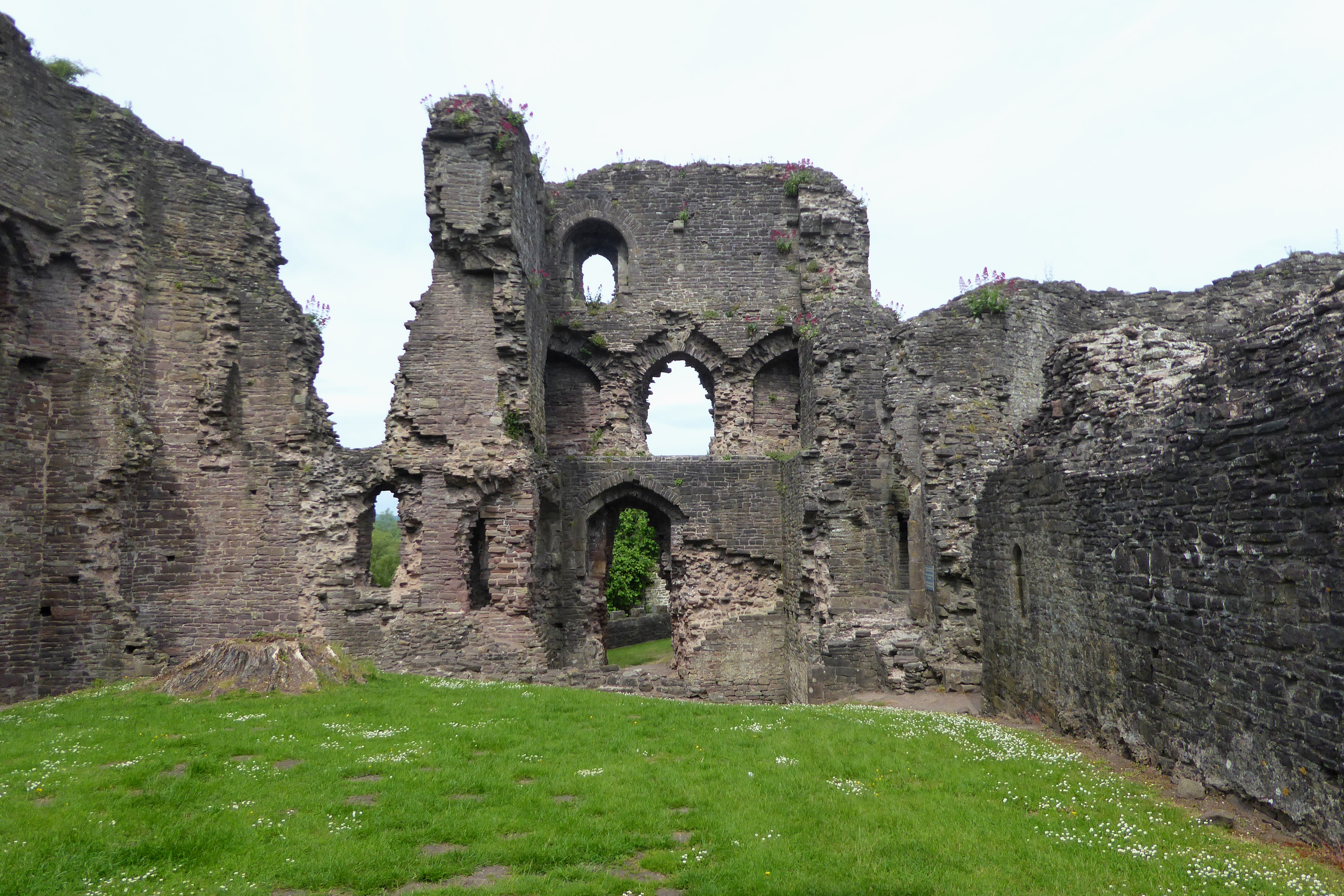
- Interior of the surviving curtain wall and four-storey tower, looking west from inside the castle grounds

Site information
- Type: Castle
- Condition: Ruins

Location
- Shown within Wales
- Location within Wales
- Coordinates: 51.82002°N 3.017647°W

Site history
- Battles/wars: Glyndŵr Rising, 1404

Listed Building – Grade I
- Designated: 1952

Abergavenny Castle (Welsh: Castell y Fenni) is a ruined castle in the market town of Abergavenny, Monmouthshire, Wales, established by the Norman lord Hamelin de Balun c. 1087. It was the site of a massacre of Welsh noblemen in 1175, and was attacked during the early 15th-century Glyndŵr Rising. William Camden, the 16th-century antiquary, said that the castle "has been oftner stain'd with the infamy of treachery, than any other castle in Wales."

It has been a Grade I listed building since 1952.

== Location ==
The castle is located immediately to the south of the town centre. It was built by the Normans to overlook the River Usk and its valley, and so guard against incursions into the lowland areas south and east of the town by the Welsh from the hills to the north and west.

== Description ==
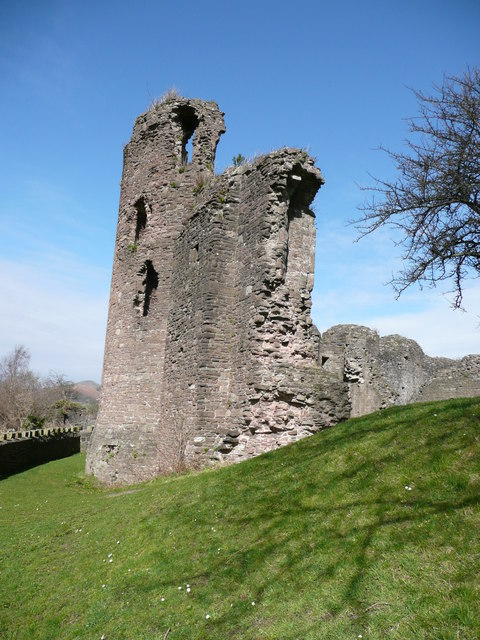
Curtain wall of Abergavenny castle, 2008

The castle, which is currently in ruins, once had a stone keep, towers, and ditch as fortifications. It also housed the family and army of the lord and had cellars, kitchens, a great hall, gatehouse, and a chapel, although it is doubtful whether any of the families treated the castle as their main residence. A curtain wall surrounded the castle.

The high, formidable curtain wall, dating from the 12th century, is now the most impressive part of the ruin. A lodge was built on the top of the motte in the 19th century.

== History ==
=== 11th to 14th centuries ===
Hamelin de Balun, a Norman lord, had the castle built about 1087. Protected by a ditch and palisade, the motte was surmounted by a wooden keep. Soon after 1100, a stone keep was built to replace the wooden structure, and a wooden hall was built on its western side.

In the 1160s, Henry Fitzmiles, the son of Miles de Gloucester, 1st Earl of Hereford and lord of Abergavenny, was killed, reputedly by Seisyll ap Dyfnwal of Castell Arnallt. Without a male heir, Henry Fitzmiles' estate and the lordship, which included lands in upper Gwent and Brecknockshire, as well as the Castle, passed to his daughter Bertha's husband, William de Braose. De Braose rebuilt parts of the castle and constructed the curtain wall, parts of which still remain.

The castle was then the scene of an infamous massacre. Over Christmas 1175 De Braose called Seisyll and his son Geoffrey to his castle, together with other leaders from Gwent, supposedly as an act of reconciliation. De Braose then had the men killed in the castle's great hall, in retribution for the death of Henry Fitzmiles. His action, including taking the men's land, resulted in sanctions: William was "retired" from public life and the castle passed to his son, William. In 1182 Hywel ap Iorwerth, lord of Caerleon, ordered the destruction of Dingestow Castle and had Abergavenny Castle set afire in retribution for the murder of Seisyll. The attacks were made by Seisyll's relatives. De Braose was not at the castle when it was burnt, but "most of his men" were taken hostage.

The castle was almost entirely rebuilt of local Old Red Sandstone, starting about 1190, to make it easier to defend. Five towers were built along the curtain walls, and a keep was built. The English and Welsh fought for control of the Welsh Marches and, during this time, possession of the castle alternated between the Welsh and English. In 1215, the castle was visited by John, King of England.

In the 13th and 14th centuries, the castle was expanded by the Hastings family, including the addition of western towers which provided residential chambers. Two towers, one circular and one polygonal, were probably built between 1295 and 1314 by John Hastings, 1st Baron Hastings. This was the same time in which murage taxes were collected from local residents to fund the building of the town walls. Between the late 13th century and the early 14th century, a new wall was built.

=== 15th to 17th centuries ===
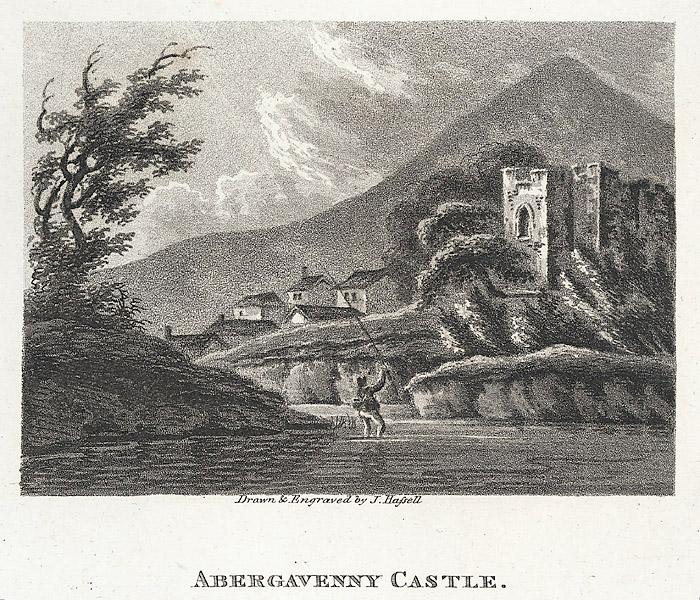
J. Hassell, Abergavenny Castle, drawing and engraving, 1807.

In 1404, during the rebellion of Owain Glyndŵr, the town of Abergavenny was sacked and burned and the castle was besieged by Welsh forces. William Beauchamp and his men had to be rescued by Richard of York and men assembled by the Sheriff of Hereford at Henry IV's request. In 1405 the garrison at the castle consisted of 80 mounted soldiers, their armed servants and 400 archers. The fortified, or barbican, gatehouse — described by architectural historian John Newman as "unimpressive" — may date from either just before, or just after, that date.

No lord took up residence at the castle after the 15th century. During the English Civil War, as the Roundheads neared the castle, Charles I ordered a slighting of the castle to prevent its useful occupation. Most of the castle buildings, including the stone keep, were destroyed. Raglan Castle was similarly damaged. Stone from the site was taken thereafter, to be used for other buildings.

=== 18th and 19th centuries ===
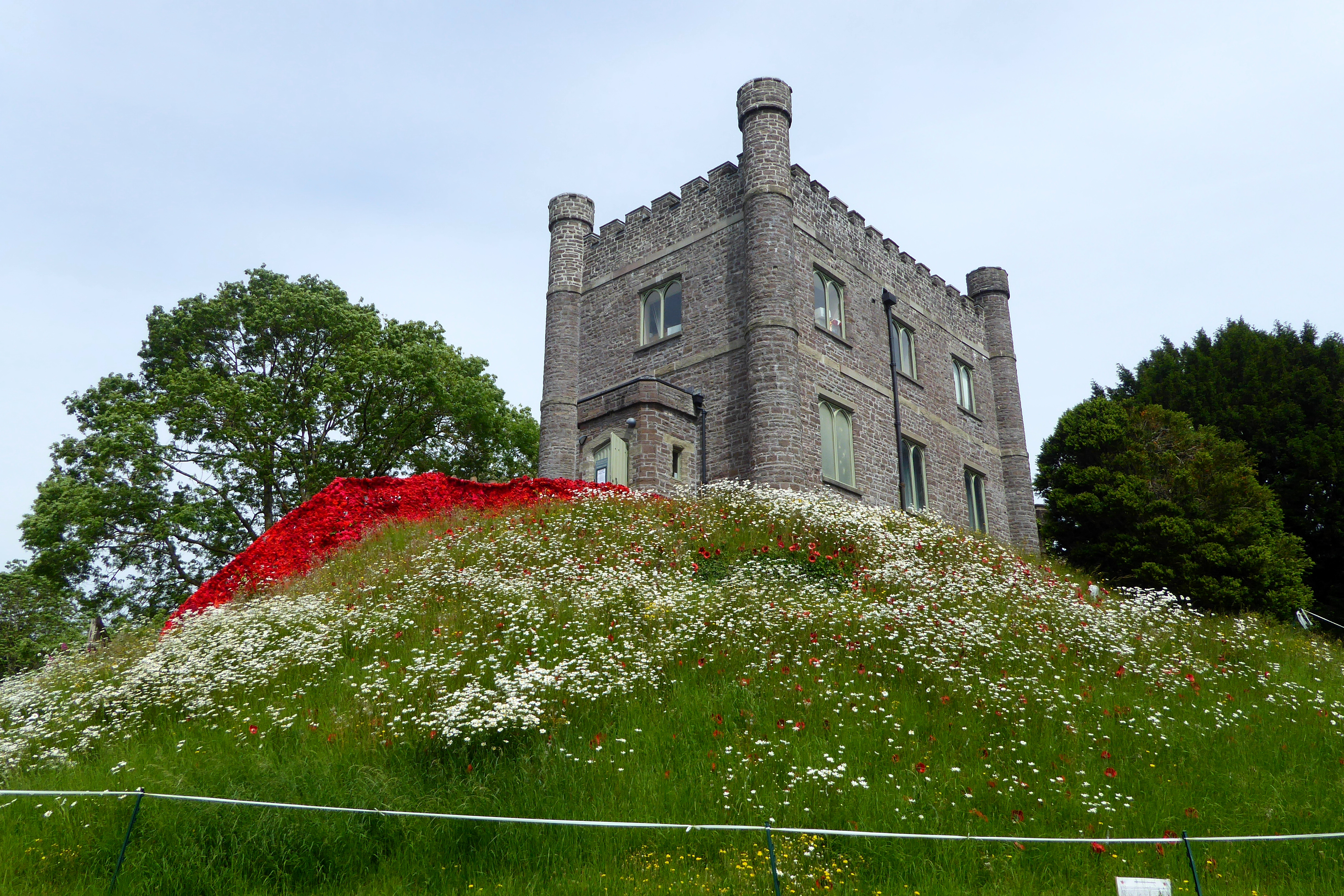
The refurbished 19th-century square hunting lodge "keep" now houses the Abergavenny Museum.

By the late 18th century, the ruins were starting to attract visitors seeking "picturesque" views, and walks were laid out within the castle walls. In 1819, Henry Nevill, 2nd Earl of Abergavenny, had a hunting lodge constructed on top of the motte. Newman describes it "an unsympathetically utilitarian structure, enlivened only by thin polygonal shafts at the angles."

A formal public garden was created later in the 19th century by William Nevill, 5th Earl of Abergavenny. It had views overlooking the Usk valley, "picturesque" walks and gardens, and gazebos.

=== 20th and 21st centuries ===
The castle and the hunting lodge, now the Abergavenny Museum, have been Grade I and Grade II listed buildings, respectively, since 5 July 1952. Other features, such as the outer wall, have been listed since 2005. The castle grounds are designated Grade II on the Cadw/ICOMOS Register of Parks and Gardens of Special Historic Interest in Wales.

== Museum ==
The castle's museum is located in the 1819 hunting lodge on top of the motte. Amongst the museum's exhibits are a saddler's workshop and a Victorian Welsh farmhouse kitchen.

== See also ==
- Abergavenny town walls
