= Bryngwyn =

Village in Monmouthshire, Wales

Coordinates: 51.77903°N 2.88560°W

Bryngwyn is a village and rural location in Monmouthshire, south east Wales.

== Location ==
Bryngwyn is located two miles to the west of Raglan in Monmouthshire.

== History and amenities ==
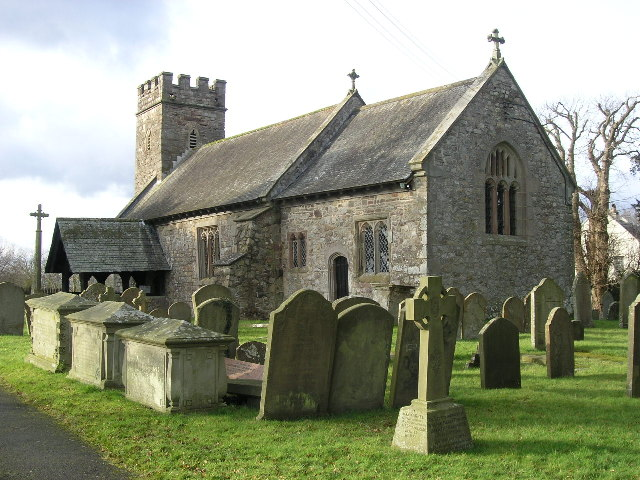
St Peter's Church

Bryngwyn is a rural area close to Raglan Castle and with easy access to Abergavenny, Raglan, Usk and Monmouth.

The village church is dedicated to St. Peter.

Richard Crawley was born here in 1840.
