= Henry Thornhill =

Henry Badham Thornhill was an Anglican priest, most notably the first Archdeacon of Perth, WA.

On his return from Australia he served at Eatington, and Henley in Arden. He died on 2 March 1874.
