= Sassoon David Sassoon =

British Indian businessman and banker

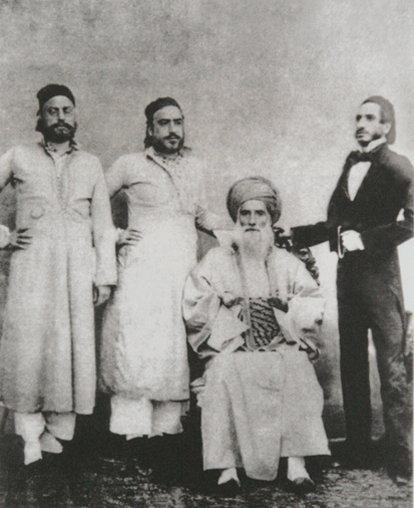
- David Sassoon (seated) and sons. Sassoon David Sassoon is on the right.
- Born: 1832; Bombay, Presidency of Bombay (Company Raj)
- Died: 1867 (aged 34–35); Langham Hotel, London, UK
- Resting place: Jewish Cemetery, Mile End
- Occupations: Businessman, banker, philanthropist
- Spouse: Flora (Fahra) Reuben
- Parent(s): David Sassoon (father); Farha Hayim or Hyeem (mother)
- Relatives: Sassoon family

Sassoon David Sassoon (August 1832 – 24 June 1867) was a British Indian Iraqi businessman, banker, and philanthropist. Sassoon was the first member of the Sassoon family to expand the family's business interests into England.

== Biography ==
=== Early life ===
Sassoon was born in August 1832 in Bombay, India. He was a member of the Sassoon family. His father was David Sassoon (1792–1864), a leading trader of cotton and opium who served as the treasurer of Baghdad between 1817 and 1829, and his mother was Farha Hayim of Baghdad. He suffered from poor health from infancy but travelled widely.

He was educated in biblical and Talmudic lore in Baghdad. He also spoke several Oriental languages with great fluency.

=== Business career ===
He proceeded to Shanghai, where he conducted the mercantile operations of the Chinese branch of the firm of David Sassoon, Sons & Co. He went to London in 1858, where he opened a bank on Leadenhall Street. Sassoon was the first member of his family to expand the family's business to England. The business grew exponentially during the American Civil War, as they suddenly became the main suppliers of cotton to British spinning mills and the British market. Sassoon was later joined by his brother, Reuben, in the family's British business operations.

=== Philanthropy ===
He served as president of a committee which had for its object the organization of an expedition to the Jews in China, Abyssinia, and the East. He was also a member of the council of Jews' College and of the committee of the Jews' Free School, which two institutions he munificently endowed. He was also a warden of the Spanish and Portuguese Synagogue. Sassoon also acted as examiner in Hebrew to the Jews' Free School in London.

=== Personal life ===
At the age of 18, he married a cousin Farha Reuben (1838–1919) of Mumbai, daughter of Solomon Reuben Sassoon of Baghdad. She later changed her name to Flora in England. They had four children giving rise to his grandchildren as follows:

- Joseph Sassoon Sassoon (1855–1918); married Louise de Gunzburg, a daughter of Horace Günzburg
  - Sassoon Joseph Sassoon (1885–1922), army officer
  - Arthur Meyer Sassoon, army officer
  - Frederick Sassoon, army officer
  - four other grandchildren
- Rachel Sassoon (later Beer) (1858–1927), newspaper editor; married Frederick Arthur Beer, son of Julius Beer
- Alfred Ezra Sassoon (1861–1895); married Theresa Thornycroft
  - Michael Thorneycroft Sassoon (1884–1969)
  - Siegfried Sassoon (1886–1967), war poet, writer and soldier
  - Hamo Watts Sassoon (1887–1915), army officer
- Frederick Meyer Sassoon (1862–1889)
  - two granddaughters

They lived at Ashley Park in Walton-on-Thames, Surrey and equally at 17 Cumberland Terrace next to Regent's Park in St Pancras, London. He died in 1867 in London, leaving an estate of £120,000 (equivalent to £11,620,000 in 2025). Later, Flora moved to 37 Adelaide Crescent in Hove, East Sussex.
