= Jackson Hall =

Jackson Hall may refer to:

== United Kingdom ==
- Jackson Hall, Cardiff, a Grade II listed building in Cardiff, Wales

== United States ==
- Andrew Jackson Hall in the Tennessee Performing Arts Center, Nashville, Tennessee
- Jackson Hall in the Mondavi Center, a performing arts venue located on the UC Davis campus, California
- Jackson Hall (University of Minnesota), a building on the campus of the University of Minnesota
- Jackson City Hall, the seat of municipal government in Jackson, Mississippi
- Jackson Hall, a building at Kentucky State University in Frankfort, Kentucky
