= Elliot Scott =

English art director (1915–1993)

- Born: 19 July 1915; London, England
- Died: 29 October 1993 (aged 78); Hillingdon, Middlesex, England
- Occupation: Art director
- Years active: 1942–1989

Elliot Scott (19 July 1915 – 29 October 1993) was an English art director. He was nominated for three Academy Awards in the category Best Art Direction.

== Selected filmography ==
Scott was nominated for three Academy Awards for Best Art Direction:

- The Americanization of Emily (1964)
- The Incredible Sarah (1976)
- Who Framed Roger Rabbit (1988)

Other films:

- The Haunting (1963)
- The Watcher in the Woods (1980)
- Indiana Jones and the Temple of Doom (1984)
- Labyrinth (1986)
- The Pirates of Penzance (1983)
