= Llanddewi Rhydderch =

Village in Monmouthshire, Wales

Coordinates: 51.81185°N 2.94281°W

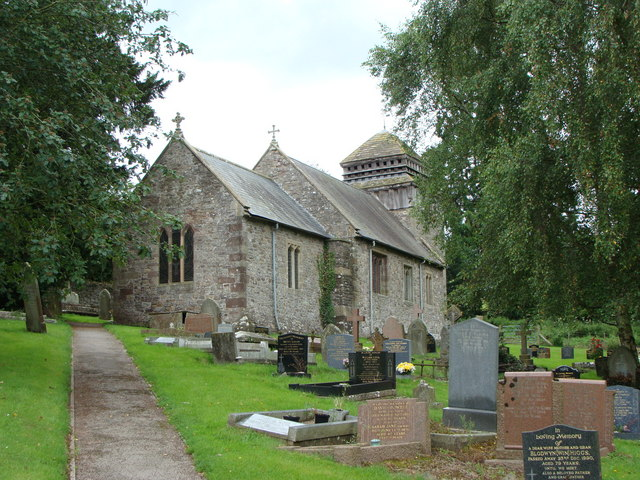
- St David's Church

- Location within Monmouthshire
- Community: Gobion Fawr
- Principal area: Monmouthshire
- Preserved county: Gwent
- Country: Wales
- Sovereign state: United Kingdom
- Police: Gwent
- Fire: South Wales
- Ambulance: Welsh
- UK Parliament: Monmouthshire

Llanddewi Rhydderch is a village in Monmouthshire, Wales at OS grid reference SO 351130. It is off the B4233 road, roughly five miles (8 km) southeast of Abergavenny, lying within the administrative community of Gobion Fawr.

== History ==
The township of Llanddewi Rhydderch grew around the small llan, or monastic cell named after St. David. St David's Church holds regular services every week. The present incumbent, Fr John Humphries, has served in the parish since 2012. In 2015 the church was successful in obtaining a National Lottery Grant to clear land at the back of the church to turn into a WW1 Memorial Meadow. The churchyard has a very old yew tree, which may be many centuries old and became a finalist in Woodland Trust Welsh tree of the year competition.

The village has been home to the honorary consulate of Kiribati since 1996. It is the only official representation of the country in Europe.

== Landmarks ==
A Baptist chapel on the edge of the village is a Grade II listed building and holds services every Sunday.

== Notable people ==
Josh Wardle, the developer of the web-based word game Wordle, was brought up in the village. In 2022 he sold the game to The New York Times for a sum in excess of $1m.
