= Rachel Beer =

British newspaper editor (1858–1927)

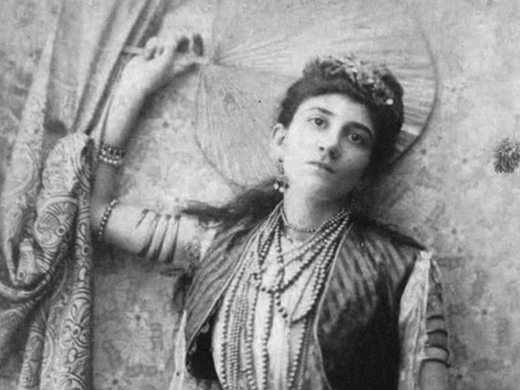
- Born: Rachel Sassoon; 7 April 1858; Bombay, Company Raj
- Died: 29 April 1927 (aged 69); Royal Tunbridge Wells, England
- Resting place: Tunbridge Wells Cemetery, England
- Other name: Rachel Sassoon Beer
- Occupations: Newspaper proprietor; editor
- Spouse: Frederick Arthur Beer (m. 1887; died 1901)
- Father: Sassoon David Sassoon
- Relatives: Julius Beer (father-in-law); Theresa Thornycroft (sister-in-law); Siegfried Sassoon (nephew); George Sassoon (great-nephew); Elias David Sassoon (uncle); Albert Sassoon (uncle); David Sassoon (grandfather)
- Family: Sassoon family

Rachel Beer (née Sassoon; 7 April 1858 – 29 April 1927) was an Indian-born British newspaper proprietor and editor. The first woman to edit a British national newspaper, Beer was editor-in-chief of The Observer and The Sunday Times.

== Early life and family ==
Rachel Sassoon was born on 7 April 1858 in Bombay, Company Raj (present-day Mumbai, India) to Sassoon David Sassoon, a businessman, banker, and philanthropist, and Fahra "Flora" Sassoon (née Reuben; 1828–1919). Through her parents Beer was a member of the Sassoon family, a prominent Baghdadi Jewish merchant family. Beer was the one of three children.

In 1858, the Sassoon family relocated to England. Beer grew up between Ashley Park and Cumberland Terrace. Beer trained and worked as a unpaid nurse at Royal Brompton Hospital.

On 4 August 1887, Beer married Frederick Arthur Beer, the owner of The Observer. Frederick was the son of businessman, banker and newspaper owner Julius Beer, and was a Jewish convert to Anglicanism. Following her marriage Beer converted to Anglicanism and was disowned by her family.

== Journalism career ==
Soon after she married Frederick Beer, she began contributing articles to The Observer, which the Beer family then owned. In 1891, she took over as editor, becoming the first female editor of a national newspaper in the process. Two years later, she purchased The Sunday Times and became the editor of that newspaper as well. Though "not ... a brilliant editor", she was known for her "occasional flair and business-like decisions".

=== Dreyfus affair ===
During her time as editor, The Observer achieved one of its greatest exclusives. A torn-up handwritten note, referred to throughout the affair as the bordereau, was found by a French housekeeper in a wastebasket at the German Embassy in Paris. The bordereau described a minor French military secret, and had obviously been written by a spy in the French military. Jewish French Army Captain Alfred Dreyfus was found guilty of being a spy for the Germans on no reliable evidence, and imprisoned on Devil's Island. The actual culprit, Major Count Esterhazy, was found not guilty on trial, but he was declared unfit for service, and fled to London. Beer knew that Esterhazy was in London because The Observer's Paris correspondent had made a connection with him; she interviewed him twice, and he confessed to being the culprit: I wrote the bordereau. She published the interviews in September 1898, reporting his confession and writing a leader column accusing the French military of antisemitism and calling for a retrial for the innocent Dreyfus.

Despite this evidence, Dreyfus was found guilty again in a later trial, but following a public outcry was pardoned into house arrest in 1899, and finally exonerated on 12 July 1906, with his military commission restored and promoted to major.

== Last years ==
Frederick died of syphilis in 1901, after having passed the disease to his wife. Her own behaviour grew increasingly erratic, culminating in a collapse. The following year she was committed and her trustees sold both newspapers. Although she subsequently recovered, Beer required nursing care for the remainder of her life, spending her final years at Chancellor House in Tunbridge Wells, where she died of the disease in 1927.

In her will she left a generous legacy to her nephew Siegfried Sassoon, enabling him to purchase Heytesbury House in Wiltshire, where he spent the rest of his life. In honour of her bequest, Siegfried hung an oil portrait of his aunt above the fireplace.

Her brother, Alfred, had been cut off by his family for marrying outside the Jewish faith; though Beer had also married a gentile, in her case the action was forgivable because of her sex.

Beer's husband, Frederick, was buried in his father's mausoleum in Highgate Cemetery in north London, but her family intervened to prevent her own burial in that bastion of Anglican religion. Instead she was due to be interred in the Sassoon family mausoleum in Brighton, Sussex, but her grave is now in the municipal cemetery at Tunbridge Wells, Kent. A marker was added to her headstone in 2020 in recognition of her work as a journalist and editor, paid for by The Observer and The Sunday Times.

== Sources ==
- Jackson, Stanley (1989). The Sassoons: Portrait of a Dynasty. William Heinemann. ISBN 0-434-37056-8.
- Curney, Vanessa (2004). ""Beer [née Sassoon], Rachel". In Matthew, Colin; Brian Harrison (eds.). Oxford Dictionary of National Biography. Vol. 4. Oxford University Press. pp. 816–817.
- Negev, Eilat and Yehuda Koren (2011) The First Lady of Fleet Street: A Biography of Rachel Beer. (London: JR Books). ISBN 978-1-906779-19-1

Media offices
Preceded by Henry Duff Traill	Editor of The Observer; 1891–1904	Succeeded by Austin Harrison
Preceded by Arthur William à Beckett	Editor of The Sunday Times; 1893–1901	Succeeded by Leonard Rees
