= St Mary's Church, Whitchurch =

Church in Cardiff, Wales

St Mary's, Whitchurch
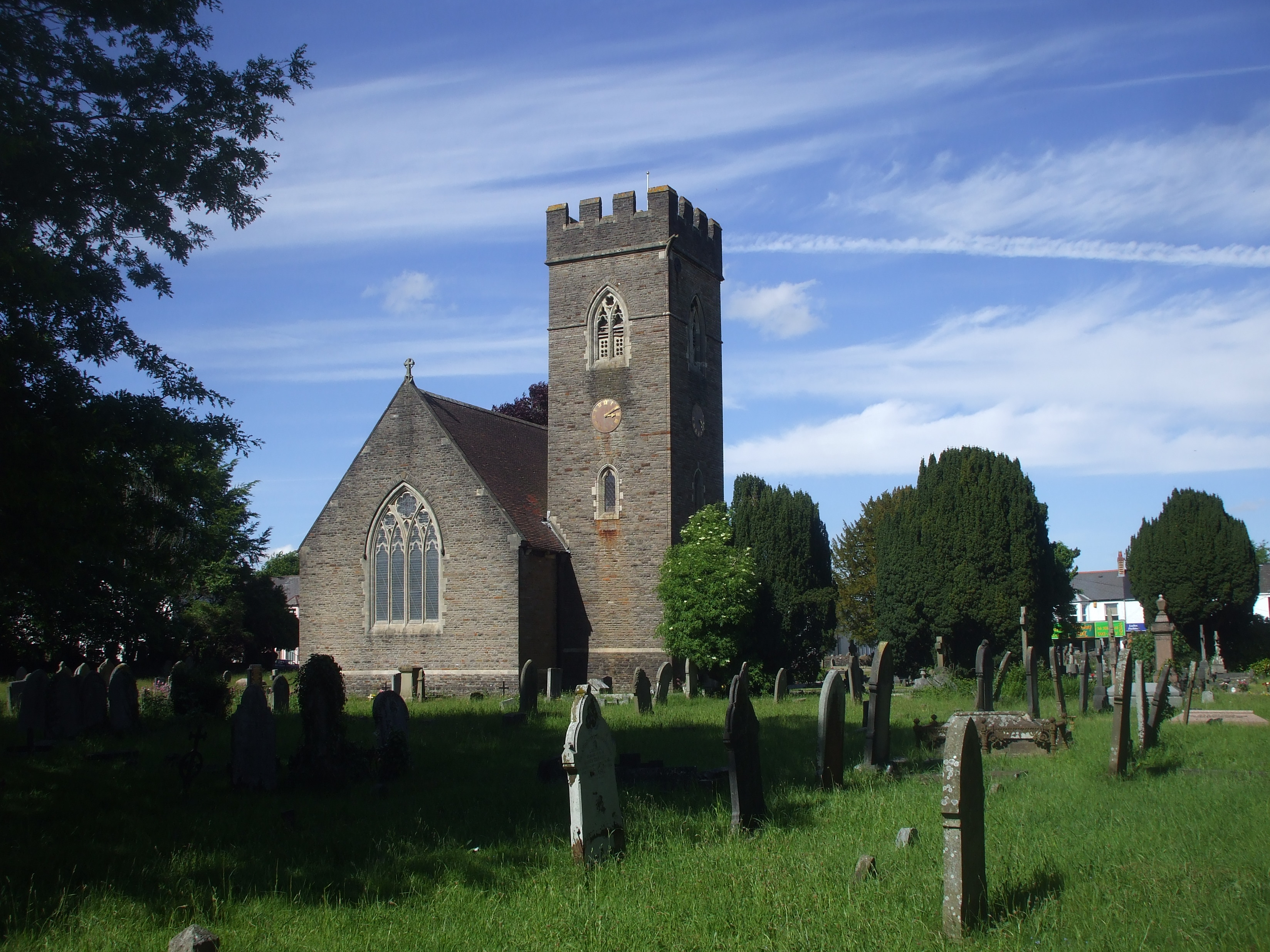
- St Mary's, Whitchurch
- 51.5133°N 3.2211°W
- Denomination: Anglican

History
- Status: Active
- Consecrated: 27 May 1885

Architecture
- Functional status: Parish church
- Heritage designation: Grade II
- Designated: 19 May 1975
- Architect: John Prichard
- Groundbreaking: 1883
- Completed: 1884
- Construction cost: £3559

Specifications
- Materials: stone

Administration
- Diocese: Llandaff

St Mary's Church, Whitchurch, is an Anglican place of worship in the suburb of Whitchurch, Cardiff. The Victorian church is a Grade II listed building.

== Early churches ==
A church in the locality is first recorded in the 12th century, though the date of its founding and its dedication are now unknown. At this time, Whitchurch was a chapel of ease to Llandaff Cathedral, and would remain so until the 19th century. The first church which is known to have carried the dedication to Mary was first erected in the 14th century. In the 15th or 16th century, a porch was added, followed later still by a nave, then a belfry of Bath stone. The graveyard dated from 1616, when a licence for baptisms, marriages and burials was obtained. Later alterations to the interior were carried out in 1810. The old church could seat 300. Despite the fact that it was growing too small for the growing population (which the new Melingriffith Tin Plate Works had bolstered to 696), the issue of the church's inadequate facilities would not be addressed for several decades. During the 19th century, Whitchurch also acquired its first Nonconformist places of worship, with the Whitchurch Methodist Church being founded in c. 1820.

== Modern church ==
As Whitchurch gradually evolved into a suburb over the 19th century, the population of the district continued to expand. Whitchurch became a separate parish in 1845. The Revd. J.T. Clarke, who became the vicar of St Mary's in 1876, was dissatisfied by the inadequate (and increasingly rundown) church, and began to agitate for a replacement. The new church was finally provided in 1884, located around 300 metres to the south-south-west from its predecessor. It was designed by John Prichard, and was consecrated for worship in 1885. After its replacement came into use, the old church was largely abandoned and lapsed into decay. It was ruinous by the turn of the 20th century and was demolished in 1904. Its graveyard remained until being converted into a public garden, St Mary's Gardens, in 1973, which is still extant on Old Church Road. The church was listed at Grade II in 1975.

== Organisation ==
The church is now part of the Taff Wenallt Ministry Area, alongside All Saints (Rhiwbina), All Saints (Llandaff North) and St Thomas's (Birchgrove).
