= Julius Beer Mausoleum =

Grade II* listed mausoleum in the London Borough of Camden, United Kingdom

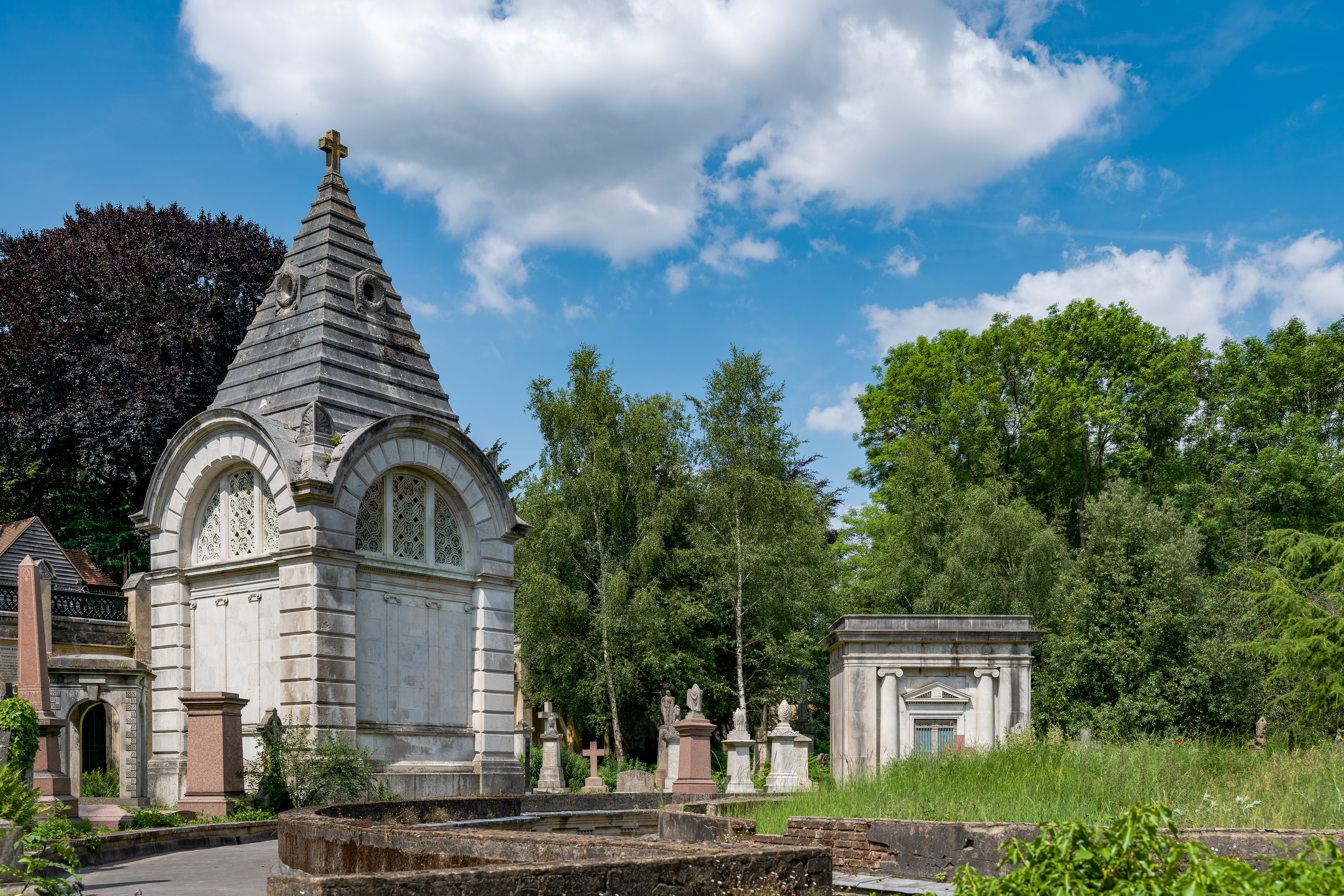
- "the most strikingly spectacular individual monument" in Highgate Cemetery

- Location within Greater London
- 51.5686°N 0.1497°W
- Type: Mausoleum
- Location: Highgate Cemetery, Camden, London

History
- Built: 1878

Site notes
- Architect(s): William Oscar Wilford Bouwens van der Boijen, designer John Oldrid Scott, executing architect
- Owner: Privately owned

Listed Building – Grade II*
- Official name: Mausoleum of Julius Beer in Highgate (Western) Cemetery
- Designated: 14 May 1974
- Reference no.: 1378887

The Julius Beer Mausoleum stands in Highgate Cemetery, in the London Borough of Camden. It commemorates Julius Beer, a financier of German origins who made a fortune on the Victorian Stock Exchange, and members of his family. The mausoleum is a Grade II* listed structure.

== History and description ==
Julius Beer (1836–1880) was born in Frankfurt, Germany. Moving to England in the mid-19th century, he made a large fortune on the London Stock Exchange and later purchased The Observer newspaper. Beer and his wife, Thyrza, had two children, a son Frederick, and a daughter, Ada, who died from Scarlet fever at the age of eight in 1875. Beer commissioned the mausoleum in 1876, intending it as a burial place for Ada, who was originally interred elsewhere in Highgate Cemetery, and for himself and his wider family. Ultimately, Beer, his wife, both of their children, and Beer's brother, Arnold, who died in 1881, were all interred in the tomb. (Note: Beer's daughter-in-law, Rachel, who had married his son Frederick in 1887, later edited The Observer, for a period in conjunction with The Sunday Times which they acquired in 1893. Rachel Beer had also intended to be interred in the Beer Mausoleum, but objections from her relatives, the Jewish Sassoon family who had also opposed her marriage, saw her buried in an unmarked grave in Tunbridge Wells.)

The designer of the mausoleum, William Oscar Wilford Bouwens van der Boijen, was a Dutch-born, naturalised French architect who studied at the École des Beaux-Arts and built up a large practice in Paris, working for French bankers on both their private homes, and their institutional buildings such as the Crédit Lyonnais headquarters. A family friend of Beer, he owed the mausoleum commission to this connection. John Oldrid Scott, son of the noted architect George Gilbert Scott was appointed to oversee the building's construction. The relationship between Bouwens and Scott subsequently descended into controversy. As early as 1878, Scott was credited in The Builder as being solely responsible for the mausoleum's design, an impression he did not correct. Some years later, when Bouwens learnt of this and objected, Scott suggested that it was a joint work, that Beer had given him a "free hand" to make modifications to Bouwens' design, and that he had done so. Bouwens also rejected this interpretation. Most modern studies credit Bouwens as sole designer, although the London 4: North volume in the Buildings of England series, revised by Bridget Cherry and reissued in 2002, and the website of the Mausolea and Monuments Trust still credit Scott.

The Beer Mausoleum is described by the Highgate Cemetery Trust as, "the finest monument in the cemetery". Bridget Cherry concurred, calling it "the most strikingly spectacular individual monument". The design draws on the Mausoleum at Halicarnassus, one of the Seven Wonders of the Ancient World. Built in coursed stone, to a square plan, four arches support a stepped pyramid roof. The interior is of equal richness and elaboration, in a Quattrocento style. The centrepiece is a bust of Beer's daughter, Ada, being carried to Heaven by an angel, undertaken by the sculptor, Henry Hugh Armstead. The mausoleum is a Grade II* listed structure.

== Gallery ==
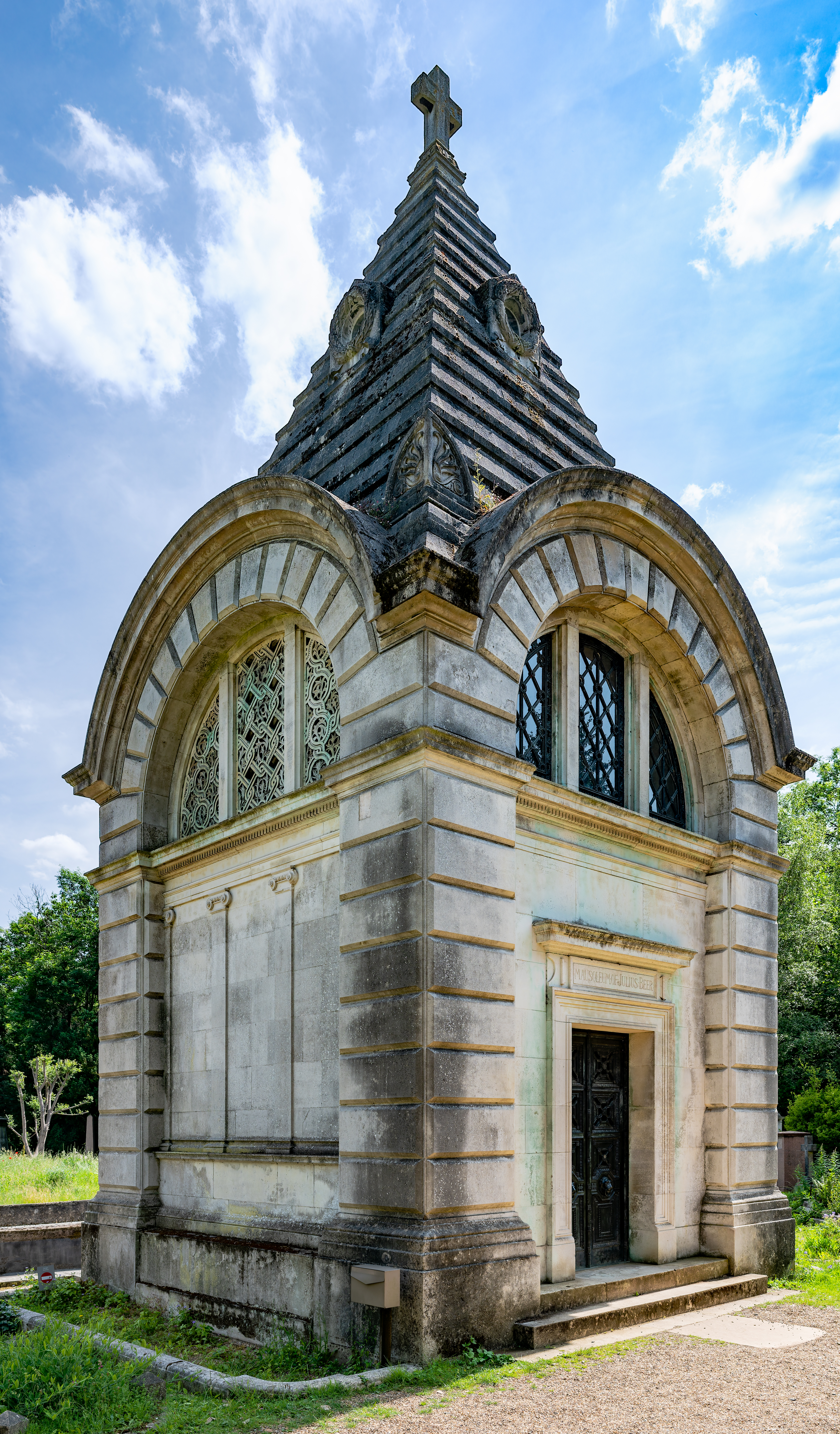
Close view

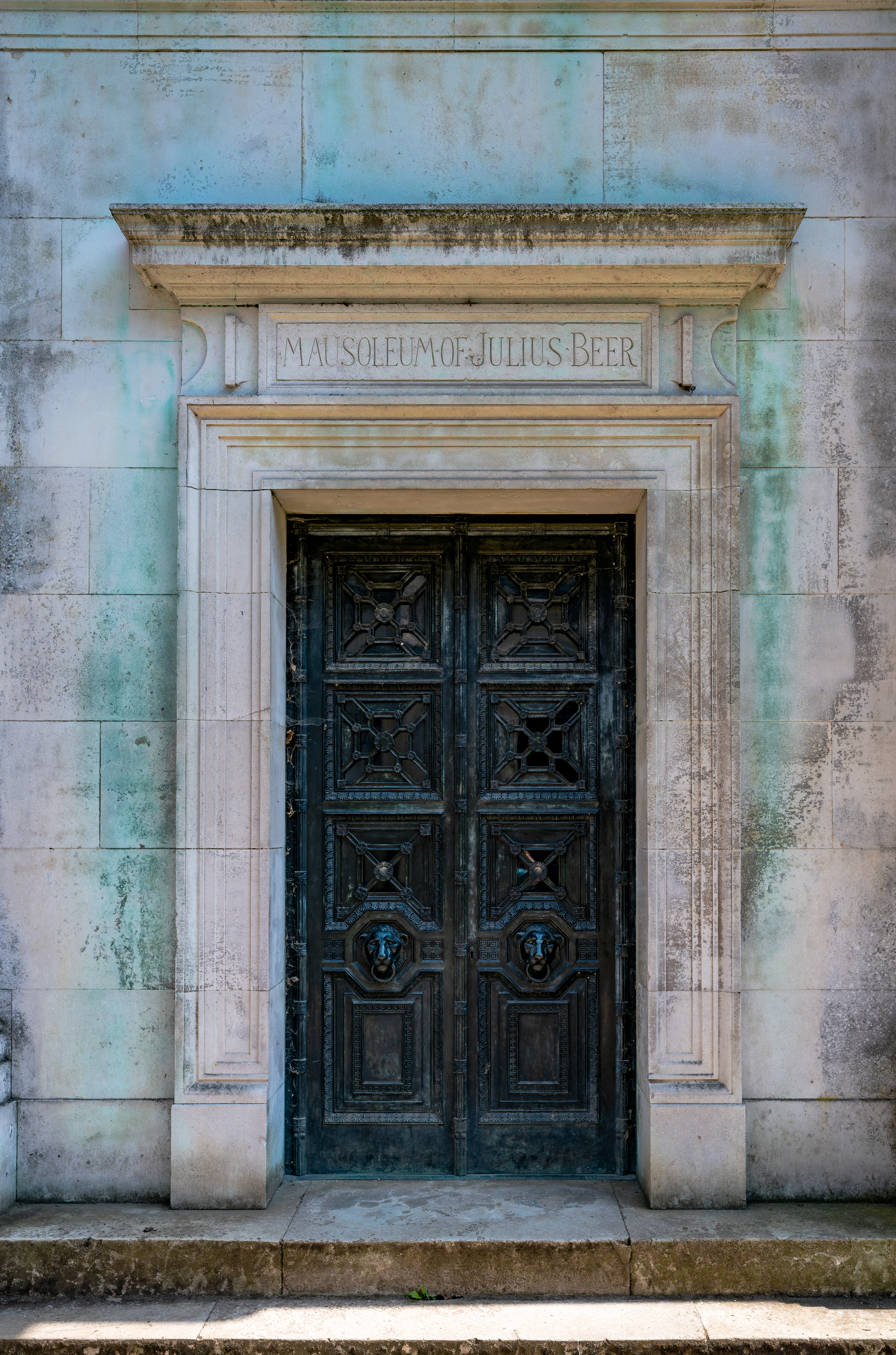
Beer commemorated above the entrance portal

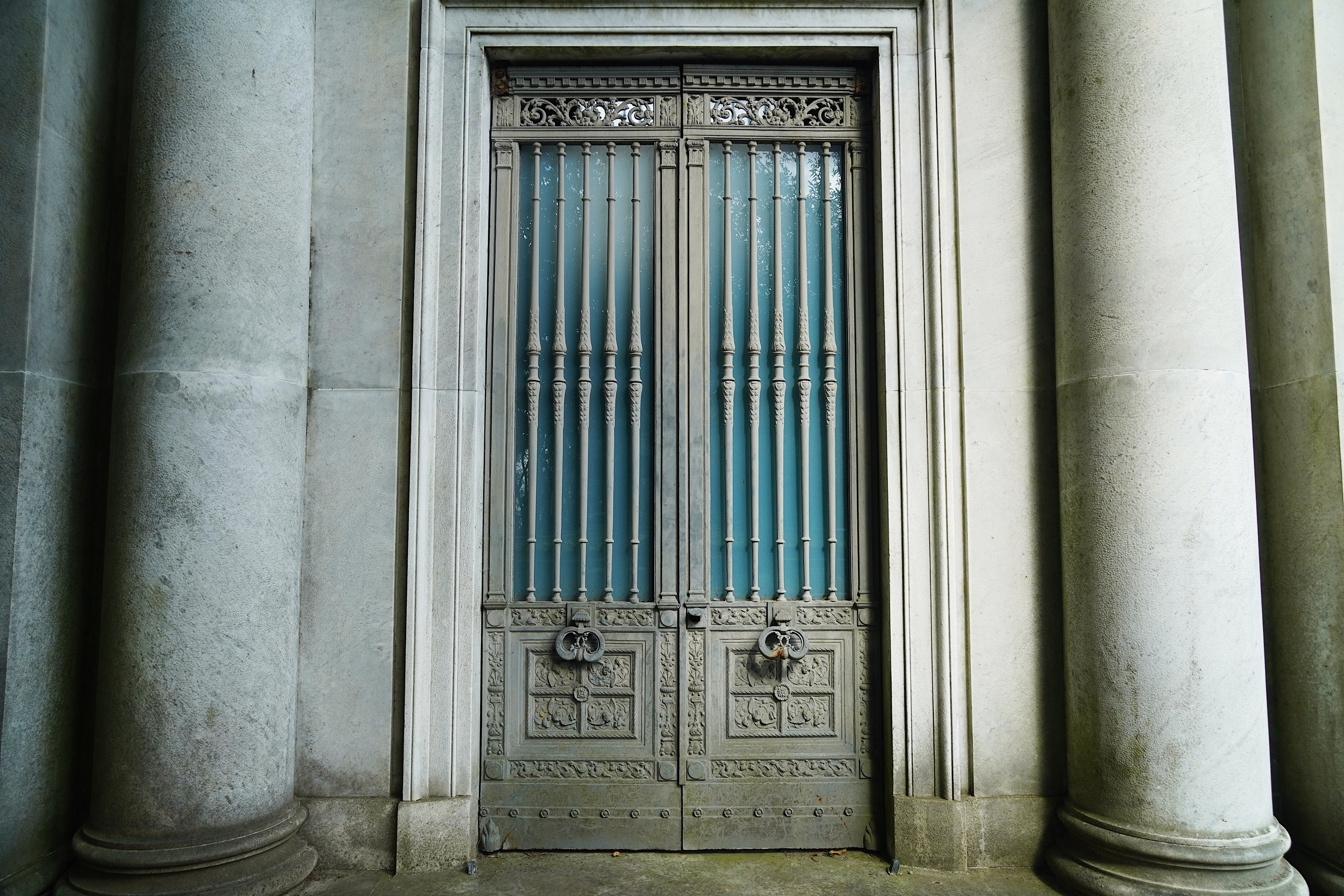
The mausoleum gates

== Sources ==
- Cherry, Bridget; Pevsner, Nikolaus (2002). London 4: North. The Buildings of England. New Haven, US and London: Yale University Press. ISBN 978-0-300-09653-8.
- Dungavell, Ian (April 2023). "The real designer of the Beer mausoleum" (PDF). Highgate Cemetery Newsletter.
