= The Haunting (1963 film) =

1963 British horror film by Robert Wise

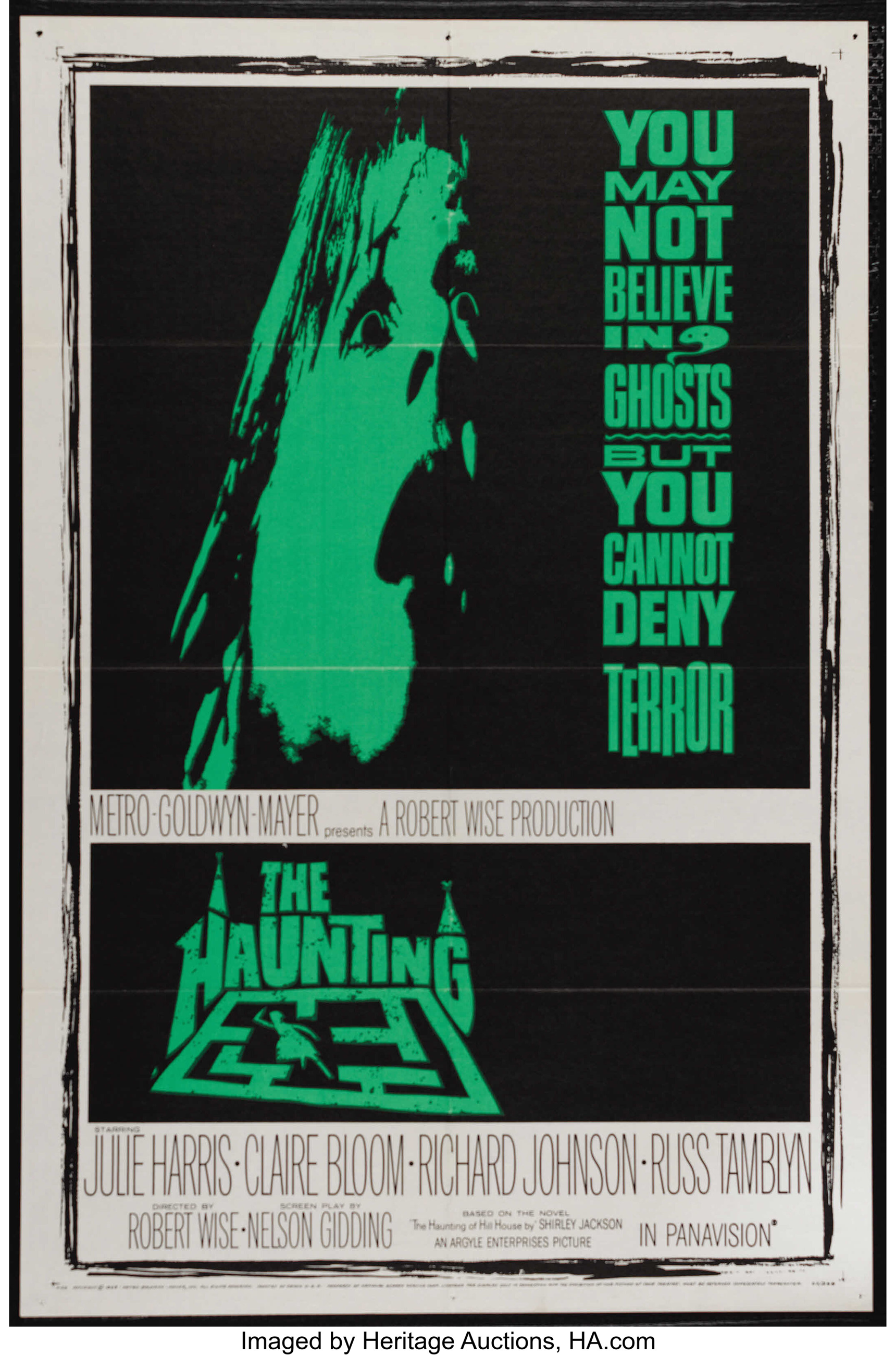
- Theatrical release poster
- Directed by: Robert Wise
- Screenplay by: Nelson Gidding
- Based on: The Haunting of Hill House; 1959 novel by Shirley Jackson
- Produced by: Robert Wise
- Starring: Julie Harris; Claire Bloom; Richard Johnson; Russ Tamblyn
- Cinematography: Davis Boulton
- Edited by: Ernest Walter
- Music by: Humphrey Searle
- Production company: Argyle Enterprises
- Distributed by: Metro-Goldwyn-Mayer
- Release dates: 18 September 1963 (U.S.); 9 January 1964 (U.K.)
- Running time: 114 minutes
- Country: United States; United Kingdom
- Language: English
- Budget: $1.05 million
- Box office: $1.02 million

The Haunting is a 1963 supernatural horror film directed and produced by Robert Wise, adapted by Nelson Gidding from Shirley Jackson's 1959 novel The Haunting of Hill House. It stars Julie Harris, Claire Bloom, Richard Johnson, and Russ Tamblyn. The film depicts the experiences of a small group of people invited by a paranormal investigator to investigate a purportedly haunted house.

Screenwriter Gidding, who had worked with director Wise on the 1958 film I Want to Live!, began a six-month write of the script after reading the book, which Wise had given to him. He perceived the book to be more about mental breakdown than ghosts, and although he was informed after meeting author Shirley Jackson that it was very much a supernatural novel, elements of mental breakdown were introduced into the film. The film was shot in the UK, at the MGM-British Studios near London on a budget of US$1.05 million, with exteriors and the grounds shot at Ettington Park (now the Ettington Park Hotel) in the village of Ettington, Warwickshire. Julie Harris was cast by Wise, who found her ideal for the psychologically fragile Eleanor, though during production she suffered from depression and had an uneasy relationship with her co-stars. The interior sets were by Elliot Scott, credited by Wise as instrumental in the making of The Haunting. They were designed to be brightly lit, with no dark corners or recesses; all the rooms had ceilings to create a claustrophobic effect on film. Numerous devices and tricks were used in the filming. Wise used a 30mm anamorphic, wide-angle lens Panavision camera that was not technically ready for use and caused distortions. It was only given to Wise on condition that he sign a memorandum in which he acknowledged that the lens was imperfect. Wise and cinematographer Davis Boulton planned sequences that kept the camera moving, utilising low-angle takes, and incorporating unusual pans and tracking shots.

The film was released on 18 September 1963. Despite initially receiving mixed reviews, retrospective critics have been much more positive; with the film being praised for its atmosphere, psychological depth, and the acting of its two female leads. In 2010, The Guardian newspaper ranked it as the 13th-best horror film of all time. Director Martin Scorsese placed The Haunting first on his list of the 11 scariest horror films of all time. The Haunting was released on DVD in its original screen format with commentary in 2003, and was released on Blu-ray on 15 October 2013. The film received a remake in 1999 from director Jan de Bont, starring Liam Neeson, Lili Taylor, Catherine Zeta-Jones and Owen Wilson, which was met with a widespread negative critical response.

== Plot ==
Dr John Markway narrates the history of the 90-year-old Hill House, which was constructed in Massachusetts, United States, by Hugh Crain for his wife. She died when her carriage crashed against a tree as she approached the house for the first time. Crain remarried, but his second wife died in the house from a fall down the stairs. Crain's daughter Abigail lived in the house for the rest of her life, never moving out of the nursery room. She died calling for her nurse-companion. The companion inherited the house, but hanged herself from a spiral staircase in the library. Hill House was inherited by Mrs Sannerson, a distant relative of the companion, although the house has stood empty for some time.

Markway wishes to study the reported paranormal activity at Hill House and sends invitations for people to join his investigation; Mrs Sannerson demands that Markway allow her heir Luke Sannerson to join. Only two other individuals accept—Theodora, a psychic, and Eleanor Lance, who experienced poltergeist activity as a child. Eleanor has spent her adult life caring for her invalid mother, whose recent death has left Eleanor with severe guilt.

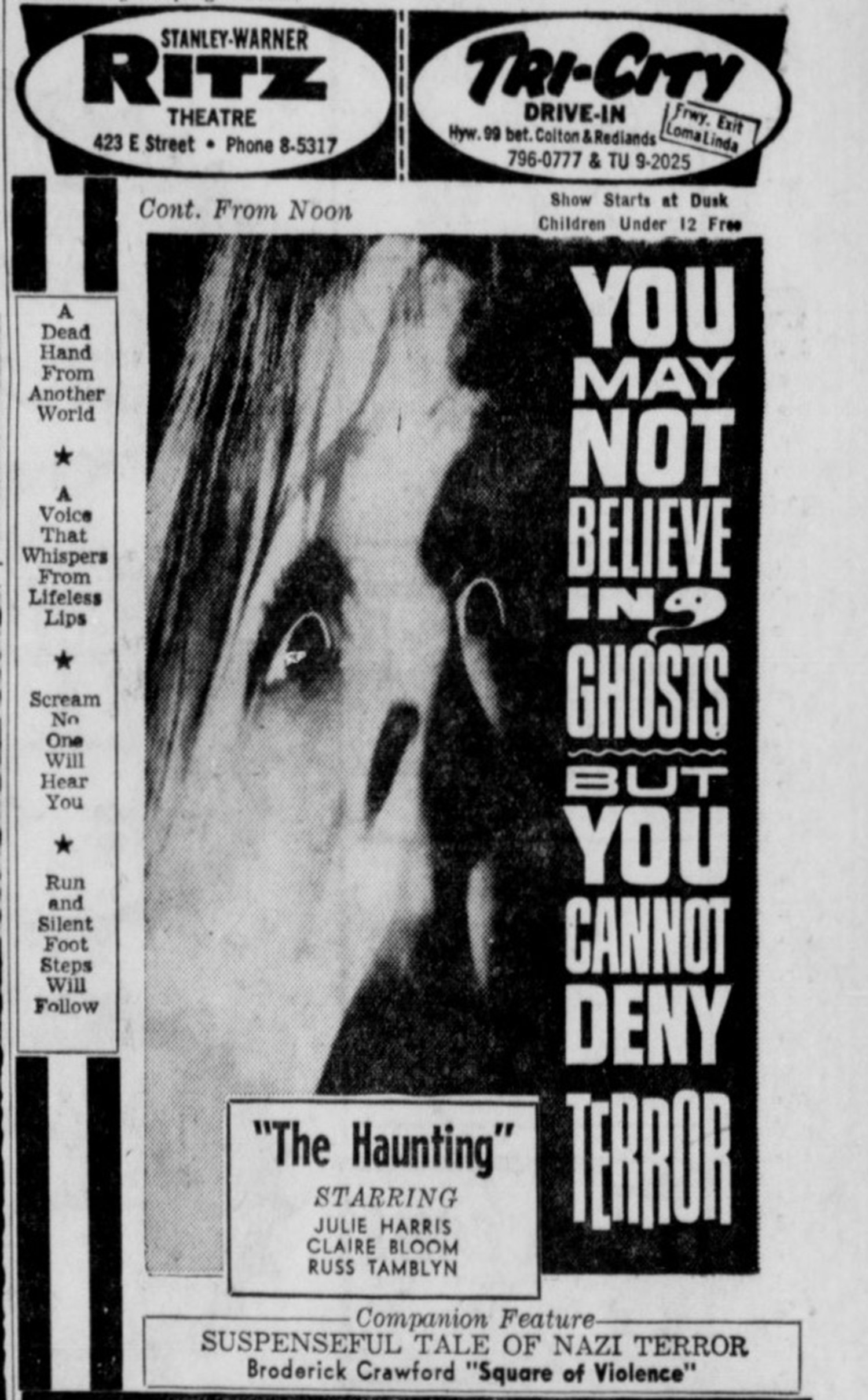
Advertisement from 1963

The group find the mansion's walls were constructed with angles askew, resulting in off-centre perspectives and doors that open and close by themselves. During their first night in the house, Eleanor and Theo are terrified by banging sounds made against the door, and hear menacing laughter. Luke and the doctor, however, report the house had been silent for them. In the morning, the words "Help Eleanor come home" are found scrawled on a wall, distressing Eleanor. The group explores the house, discovering a huge marble composite statue, supposedly of St Francis curing lepers, which seems to echo the string of characters who have lived in the house (Hugh Crain, Abigail and the companion), but also resemble Dr Markway, Luke, Theo and Eleanor.

The doctor, Luke and Theodora explore the library with the treacherous spiral staircase, but Eleanor has a severe reaction that prevents her from entering. Leaning over the veranda to look at the library's tower, she becomes dizzy and is caught by Markway, who speculates that he should send her home, but Eleanor protests. Dr Markway discovers a cold spot outside the nursery room. Despite these occurrences, Eleanor feels an affinity to Hill House.

That night, on Markway's insistence, Theo moves into Eleanor's room, and they fall asleep in the twin beds pushed together. Eleanor is awakened by the voice of a man speaking and a woman laughing. Fearful, she asks Theo to hold her hand. As she hears the sound of a girl crying, she shouts. Theo awakens to find that Eleanor has moved from the bed to the couch, and Eleanor realises it was not Theo's hand she held.

The following day, Theo confronts Eleanor about her feelings for Dr Markway, and Eleanor lashes back at Theo for being "unnatural," implying either Theo's psychic ability to know what Eleanor is thinking or her attraction to Eleanor. Dr Markway's sceptical wife Grace arrives with plans to join the group for the duration of the investigation, to the consternation of Eleanor, who had begun developing feelings for Markway while unaware that he was married. Grace demands a room in the nursery despite her husband's warning that it is likely the centre of the disturbances. That night in the living room, the group experiences loud banging and an unseen intruder attempting to force its way into the room, causing the door to bulge inward. The banging moves toward the nursery, and Dr Markway pursues it as does Eleanor by using a different exit from the living room. Mrs Markway has disappeared and then Eleanor splits off from the group. Her instability worsens as she enters the library and climbs the spiral staircase, followed by Markway, who tries to coax her down despite the stairwell coming loose from the wall. At the top, Eleanor nearly falls to her death whilst glimpsing Grace above her. Markway grabs her and saves her. No one believes she saw Grace.

Markway insists Eleanor leave but she pleads to stay, convinced the house wants her. If she leaves she thinks Grace will take her place. Eleanor drives off toward the front gates. The steering wheel begins to turn by itself, and she surrenders to the unseen force. A female figure suddenly appears in front of the car, causing Eleanor to crash into a tree and die. Markway and the others arrive to find that the figure is Grace, who says she woke in fear and tried to find her husband but the house kept her lost. She ended up in the attic when she was trying to find a way back, and Eleanor saw her through a trapdoor hatch. She is unsure of how she found her way outside. Luke observes that Eleanor deliberately aimed the car at the tree, but Markway asserts that something was in the car with her. He notes that the tree was the same one where Mrs Crain died. Theo remarks that Eleanor got what she wanted—to remain with the house. Convinced of the supernatural forces he once scoffed at, Luke says about the house, "It ought to be burned down and the ground sowed with salt."

== Cast ==
- Julie Harris as Eleanor Lance
- Claire Bloom as Theodora
- Richard Johnson as Dr John Markway
- Russ Tamblyn as Luke Sannerson
- Fay Compton as Mrs Sannerson
- Rosalie Crutchley as Mrs Dudley
- Lois Maxwell as Grace Markway
- Valentine Dyall as Mr Dudley
- Diane Clare as Carrie Fredericks
- Ronald Adam as Eldridge Harper

== Production ==
Robert Wise was in pre-production (Wise would misremember this as 'post-production') on West Side Story when he read a review in Time magazine of author Shirley Jackson's novel, The Haunting of Hill House. Wise read the book and found it frightening; he passed it to screenwriter colleague Nelson Gidding, with whom he had worked on the film I Want to Live! (1958). Gidding did a full story treatment for Wise before proceeding to work on the adaptation. As Gidding crafted the screenplay, he came to believe that the novel was not a ghost story at all, but rather a compilation of the insane thoughts of the lead character, Eleanor Vance. He theorised that Vance was having a nervous breakdown, envisaging a scenario in which Hill House is the hospital where she is held, Markway is her psychiatrist, the cold, banging, and violence are the results of shock treatment, and the opening and closing of doors reflected the opening and closing of hospital doors. Wise and Gidding travelled to Bennington, Vermont, United States, to meet Jackson, who told them that it was a good idea but that the novel was definitely about the supernatural. Nonetheless, elements of the insanity concept remained in the script, so that the audience was left wondering whether the supernatural events in the film were in Eleanor's mind or whether they were real. It was also during their visit to speak with Jackson that Wise and Gidding chose the title for the film. As they did not want to keep the book title, they asked Jackson if she had considered an alternative title. She suggested The Haunting, which Wise and Gidding immediately adopted.

=== Script ===
Writing the screenplay took about six months. During this period, Gidding worked alone, and although he passed some of his work to Wise to show him that work on the screenplay was progressing well, he and Wise did not otherwise collaborate on the screenplay. The screenplay made other changes to the story. The number of characters was cut down, the backstory was significantly shortened, most of the supernatural events depicted in the novel were kept off-screen, and the greater part of the action was set inside the house to heighten the audience's feeling of claustrophobia. Eleanor's role as an outcast was also emphasised. The character of Theodora was given a sharper, slightly more cruel sense of humour in order to make her a foil for Eleanor but also to heighten Eleanor's outsider status. The role of Luke became more flippant, and Dr Markway (Montague in the novel) was made a more confident character. The screenplay was finished just after Wise completed work on West Side Story.

Wise approached United Artists with the project, but after much delay they turned him down. Wise's agent then suggested that, since Wise owed Metro-Goldwyn-Mayer (MGM) a film under an old contract, Wise should take the project there. MGM agreed, but would only give Wise a $1 million budget. Wise knew he could not do the film at MGM's Culver City Studios (now the Sony Pictures Studios), so he took it to England, as the Eady Levy gave tax breaks and financing to films made there as a way of subsidising and promoting the British film industry. Someone suggested to Wise that he approach MGM's Borehamwood Studios subsidiary. Wise had been asked to come to the United Kingdom for a Royal Command Performance of West Side Story, and during the trip made the financing pitch to MGM Borehamwood. They offered a budget of $1.050 million. With the Eady Levy support, this allowed the film to go forward with production in the United Kingdom.

=== Casting ===
Actor	Role
Julie Harris	Eleanor "Nell" Lance
Claire Bloom	Theodora "Theo"
Richard Johnson	Dr John Markway
Russ Tamblyn	Luke Sannerson
Fay Compton	Mrs Sannerson
Rosalie Crutchley	Mrs Dudley
Lois Maxwell	Grace Markway
Valentine Dyall	Mr Dudley
Diane Clare	Carrie Fredericks
Ronald Adam	Eldridge Harper
Amy Dalby	Abigail Crain – Age 80
Paul Maxwell	Bud Fredericks
Mavis Villiers	Landlady

Although Susan Hayward was reported to be in the running for one of the two female leads, Julie Harris was chosen for the role of Eleanor Vance. Wise had seen Harris on stage, and felt she was right for the part of the psychologically fragile Eleanor. Harris agreed to do the film in part because the role was complex and the idea of the house taking over Eleanor's mind was interesting. But she also chose it because she had a long-standing interest in parapsychology. Claire Bloom was cast as Theo. The decision to cast Bloom and Richard Johnson was in part because of Eady Levy requirements that the cast be partly British. Johnson was under contract to MGM. To make Bloom's Theodora character appear more bohemian, mod fashion designer Mary Quant was hired to design clothing specifically for Bloom's character.

Richard Johnson, under contract to MGM, was cast as Dr Markway. Wise saw Johnson in a Royal Shakespeare Company production of The Devils. Impressed with his acting, he offered him the role. Johnson later said he received invaluable film acting advice from Wise. Wise told him to keep his eyes steady, to blink less, and to try not to time his acting (Wise said he would take care of that in the editing room). Johnson also credited Wise with helping him to craft a much more natural acting performance. Russ Tamblyn, also under contract to MGM, initially turned down the role as Luke because he felt that the character was a jerk, although he thought that the script was very good. The studio forced him to reconsider, threatening him with suspension. Tamblyn told the cinema magazine Film Review in 1995 that while reading the script a second time, he realised the character was much more interesting. "This is the ironic part", he said, "it turned out to be one of my favourite films that I've been in!"

Stunt performer Connie Tilton appears twice in the film. She portrays the death of the "Second Mrs Crain" by flinging herself backward down a flight of stairs. Uncredited actress Freda Knorr is seen in shots before and after the fall; it is her face audiences associate with the "Second Mrs Crain". Tilton also appears when Abigail Crain's Nurse-Companion hangs herself at the top of the spiral staircase in the library. Although uncredited actress Rosemary Dorken is seen climbing the stairs and going past the camera, it is Tilton's body that suddenly appears in shot again as the Nurse-Companion hangs herself.

=== Filming ===
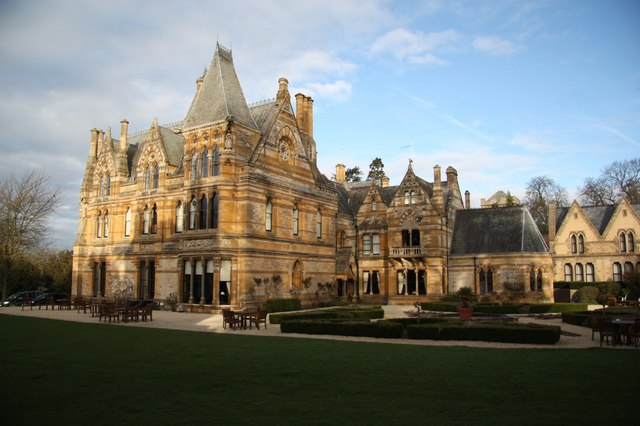
Ettington Park (shown here in 2009) was used for exteriors of haunted Hill House.

Wise called The Haunting one of his top ten or twelve favourites among the films he made, commenting that it was his favourite film-making experience. Ettington Park (now the Ettington Park Hotel), with its grounds near the village of Ettington, Warwickshire, was used for exterior shots of Hill House. Production designer Elliot Scott toured the country to look at possible candidates for Hill House, and Wise approved Scott's choice of Ettington Park. Some of the cast and crew were housed in Ettington Park during exterior shooting. However, the location did not sit well with Harris and Bloom who upon arriving at Ettington Park thought it was "scary looking outside", and Wise had to reassure them. Interior sets were constructed and shot at the MGM-British Studios in Borehamwood, Hertfordshire. The interior sets were designed by Elliot Scott, credited by Wise as a "major contributor" to The Haunting. The sets were designed to be brightly lit, with no dark corners or recesses, and decorated in a Rococo style. All rooms had ceilings to create a claustrophobic effect on film (this was unusual, as most film sets forgo ceilings to aid in lighting and filming). Actor Richard Johnson said that the sets' eeriness created a "subdued atmosphere" among the cast and crew.

Wise says that his contract with MGM specified that the picture could only be shot in black-and-white, which Wise preferred for this genre of film. He attempted to make Ettington Park look more sinister through various lighting effects and camera settings, but this failed. Wise and Boulton then hit on the idea of using infrared film for establishing shots of the house. Infrared film stocks were quickly rushed to the location shoot from Belgium. The new film worked. Wise felt the infrared film brought out the "striations of the stone" and made the mansion look like "more of a monster house". Wise very much wanted to make The Haunting a tribute to Val Lewton, the producer and writer under whom Wise had directed his first film (the supernatural horror picture Curse of the Cat People). Wise says that Lewton's theory of horror was that people were more afraid of the unknown than things they could see. The decision to show little that was supernatural was made very early in the picture's pre-production. Wise and cinematographer Davis Boulton also wanted to make distances in the film (such as hallways) look longer and darker than the audience would anticipate. Wise approached the Panavision company, and wanted an anamorphic, wide-angle lens. The only lens Panavision had was a 40mm. Wise learned that the company was working on a 30mm lens, but it contained distortions and was not ready. Wise kept pressing, and eventually Panavision turned over the 30mm lens on the condition that Wise signed a memorandum in which he acknowledged it was imperfect. Wise and Boulton also planned shots that kept the camera moving, utilised low-angle shots, and incorporated unusual pans and tracking shots. This led to some of the most active camera movements in Wise's film career. To accentuate the feeling that the house was alive, exterior shots were filmed so that the windows appeared to be eyes.

During the shoot, Harris suffered from depression, and believed that her co-stars did not take the film as seriously as she did. At times, she would cry in her makeup chair prior to the day's shoot. The other actors remember her as being distant, not a part of their socialising and joking, and Harris did not speak to Bloom during filming, which puzzled Bloom. Afterward, Harris told Bloom that the lack of interaction had helped her build her own performance and the two women reconciled. Harris incorporated her own depression into her performance. Wise heightened the sense of character conflict by having the characters "step on one another's lines", allowing one character to begin talking before the other had finished. On occasion, the characters simply talk at the same time.

To enhance the actors' performances during scenes in which they react to off-stage voices or sounds, Wise and his sound editors created a "pre-scored" soundtrack of voices and noises. These were played back during filming, and Wise says they greatly enhanced the acting performances. Although some sounds were replaced during post-production, the "pre-scored" sounds were left on the soundtrack just as the actors heard them. Sound editors collected and created sounds in an empty manor house for a week to create the pre-score. Some of the sounds are very low in the bass range, which can cause physical sensations at high volume.

=== Effects and editing ===
The film contains a number of special effects, many of which were achieved in ways not immediately obvious to the viewer. In one scene, a supernatural force pushes against a large parlour door, bending it inward repeatedly. Though the door appears to some viewers to have been made of latex, it was in fact made of laminated wood; the strange buckling was simply the result of a strong crew member pushing a piece of timber hard against it.

Two physical effects were used to make the spiral staircase in the library appear frightening. In one scene, the camera appears to ascend the staircase at a rapid rate. Wise achieved this effect by using the staircase's handrail as a makeshift dolly track: a camera was attached to the rail and then slowly allowed to slide down, with the speed of the descent controlled by a wire attached to the camera. The sequence was then reversed and run at high speed, which gave the final cut an unworldly feel. In another scene, the staircase appears to become unstable and give way as Luke Sannerson ascends it. Later, Eleanor goes up the staircase in a trance-like state and is rescued by Dr Markway, even as the staircase seems ready to collapse. The collapsing staircase effect was designed by a metalworker at the Borehamwood studios. The effect was created by tying portions of the steps and railing to a cable that ran inside the staircase's central support column. When the cable was slackened, elements of the stairway loosened up and moved freely. Conversely, when the cable was tightened, the staircase appeared solid and stable. The effect disturbed the cast so much that Robert Wise had to ascend the staircase while it was shaking in order to prove that it was safe.

Other effects also relied on simple cinema tricks. Early in the film, the audience sees Abigail Crain lying in bed, aging from a young child to an old woman. A camera was fixed over the bed, and four different actresses (each a different age) posed in the bed beneath the camera. Dissolves were then used to illustrate the ageing process. In another scene, the characters come across a "cold spot" in the haunted mansion. Wise had initially wanted the actors to simply play up "the 'quality of [being] cold' in [the] sequence", but he quickly recognised that an additional visual effect was needed to more clearly emphasise the temperature drop. To overcome the unique issue of having to "photograph 'nothing'", Wise instructed the makeup department to apply a special makeup onto the actors. This makeup contained a compound that was usually invisible to the naked eye but that appeared under certain filters. When it came time to film, the actors walked onto the portion of the set that was supposed to represent the cold spot, and these filters were gradually drawn over the set's lights. This gave the visual impression that the characters had turned pale due to a drop in temperature.

Unconventional camera work is used to heighten the frightening qualities of the film: Eleanor is often viewed from above, and in one scene the camera closes in so tightly on her that she is flattened against a balcony. Her viewpoint is often juxtaposed with eerie views of the house, as if both viewpoints were the same, and Dutch angles are used to imply that reality is off-kilter. The film was then edited in a disorienting fashion to increase audience's discomfort, with rapid cuts that throw off the viewer's sense of spatial orientation. Traditional cutting on action is often violated—characters exit a room to the right, for example, only to be shown entering the next room from the left—so that the viewer cannot establish a clear sense of how rooms and hallways connect. The film lacks temporal clues; there are few shots in which the audience can see out a window to determine whether it is night or day. In other instances, windows are visible but do little to establish temporality: for instance, when Eleanor is rescued by Dr Markway on the unstable spiral staircase, some of the windows nearby show strong sunlight streaming in, while others show darkness outside.

=== Music ===
The largely atonal orchestral score for the film was written by Oxford-born composer Humphrey Searle (1915–1982), a pupil of the modernist composer Anton Webern. Searle is considered to be one of the foremost pioneers of serial music in the United Kingdom. While Searle scored other films as well, he is primarily known as a composer of concert music, including symphonies, ballets and chamber music. As later demonstrated by William Friedkin's use of the music by Krzysztof Penderecki in The Exorcist (1973) and Stanley Kubrick in The Shining (1980), atonal music is often used effectively to underscore horror films. The Haunting is one of the first horror films to employ an original score written in this idiom. Searle's music was never released as a commercial soundtrack album, however The Westminster Philharmonic Orchestra, conducted by Kenneth Alwyn, recorded a selection from the score, reconstructed by Philip Lane, featured on the 1996 Silva Screen Records compilation album Horror!

=== Lesbian content ===
The Haunting is notable for its lesbian character, Theodora. Although the character's lesbianism is subtly mentioned in the novel, the film makes it explicit. The film is also one of the few Hollywood motion pictures of its day to depict a lesbian as feminine and not predatory. Theodora's lesbianism helps to create conflict in the picture. Had Theodora been heterosexual, Eleanor's growing attraction to Markway would not have threatened her. But with Theodora a clear lesbian, Markway becomes a threat that causes conflict between the psychic and the investigator. Originally, Gidding's script had contained a scene early in the film in which Theodora is shown in her apartment in the city. It is clear from the context that she has just broken off with her female lover: "I hate you" is written on the mirror in lipstick. Theodora is yelling curses at her out the window and more. However, Wise decided to cut the scene, believing it to be too explicit for a film that worked hard to make things implicit. According to Harris, film censors demanded that Theo never be shown to touch Eleanor, in order to keep the lesbianism less obvious.

== Release ==
=== Critical reception ===
The Haunting first opened in the US, in New York and Los Angeles on 18 September 1963. Audiences were frightened by it. Film critic Dora Jane Hamblin related how four of her female friends went to see the film, which proved so frightening that afterwards, the group spent 15 minutes looking for the contents of their purses, which had spilled onto the floor over the course of the movie as the women jumped out of their seats from fear. In Houston, Texas, a local cinema promoted the film as so chilling that it held a contest to see which of four patrons could sit all the way through a midnight screening; the prize was $100. Despite these stunts, The Haunting was only an average success at the box office.

The Haunting opened to a mixed reception, the consensus generally being that it was a stylish film with a deep atmosphere but had flaws in the plot and lacked excitement. Variety called the acting effective, Davis Boulton's cinematography extraordinarily dextrous and visually exciting, and Elliott Scott's production design of the "monstrous" house most decidedly the star of the film. However, the unnamed reviewer felt Gidding's screenplay had "major shortcomings" in that the plot was incomprehensible at points, and the motivation for the characters was poor. Bosley Crowther of The New York Times cited The Haunting as "one of the most highly regarded haunted house films ever produced" but surmised that "there is really no point to it". Writing in The Atlantic magazine, critic Pauline Kael called the film "moderately elegant and literate and expensive", but criticised Russ Tamblyn for being "feeble [and] cowardly-comic". She considered the film to be superior to Alfred Hitchcock's The Birds, also released in 1963, yet didn't consider it to be a great film. Kael said of it, "It wasn't a great movie but I certainly wouldn't have thought that it could offend anyone. Yet part of the audience at The Haunting wasn't merely bored, it was hostile—as if the movie, by assuming interests they didn't have, made them feel resentful or inferior. I've never felt this in an audience toward crude, bad movies… But the few scattered people at The Haunting were restless and talkative, the couple sitting near me arguing—the man threatening to leave, the woman assuring him that something would happen. In their terms, they were cheated: nothing happened. And, of course, they missed what was happening all along, perhaps because of nervous impatience or a primitive notion that the real things are physical.". Later on, however, in her 1982 book 5001 Nights at the Movies she'd more positively summarize her thoughts on the film as "An elegantly sinister scare movie, literate and expensive (though basically a traditional ghost story), with those two fine actresses Claire Bloom and Julie Harris. As a Greenwich Village lesbian, Bloom plays a female variant of the role that would once have been assigned to Dwight Frye; Julie Harris is the chaste heroine, a post-Freudian version of those anemic virgins Helen Chandler used to play. This “old dark house” movie is set in a marvellous Victorian gothic pile in New England, and it’s good fun. With Richard Johnson, Russ Tamblyn, Fay Compton, Valentine Dyall, Rosalie Crutchley, and Lois Maxwell. The director, Robert Wise, hadn’t done a simple amusement like this since his youth!"

A mixed review came from none other than Shirley Jackson, the author of the source novel. After seeing the film at a preview screening, she told her parents that "it is actually a very poor movie, the plot of the book changed radically, and far too much talk", although she admitted that the film contained some frightening scenes and had praise for the art direction and cinematography. After a second viewing a few weeks later, she told her friend Libbie Burke that she and her son Barry "nearly went to sleep", and that the scariest part of the day was that she had been given a parking ticket while inside the theatre.

The film's stature and following have grown substantially since its original release with reappraisals towards the film's quality. Director Martin Scorsese placed The Haunting first on his list of the 11 scariest horror films of all time. Richard Johnson says that Steven Spielberg considers The Haunting one of the "seminal films" of his youth, and Robert Wise says that Spielberg told him The Haunting was "the scariest film ever made!" Richard Armstrong in Rough Guide to Film (2007) called it "one of the most frightening films ever made", and said Julie Harris' performance is played "with an intensity that is frightening in itself". In 2010, The Guardian newspaper ranked it as the 13th-best horror film of all time. In contrast, playwright Neil LaBute has stated that they believe the film is "frankly overrated". Review aggregator website Rotten Tomatoes scores the film with an 89% rating based on 45 reviews, with an average rating of 8/10. The critical consensus reads: "Both psychological and supernatural, The Haunting is a chilling character study." Metacritic gave the film a score of 74 based on ten reviews. The film was nominated for the Golden Globe Award for Best Director (Robert Wise).

In 2010, Cinema Retro magazine hosted a screening of the film at Ettington Park, the country house used for exterior shots of Hill House. Richard Johnson was a special guest at the event and participated in a question and answer session prior to the screening. Johnson said that he had never actually set foot in the hall during filming, and that this was the first occasion he had actually been inside the premises.

=== Home media ===
In 1990, media mogul Ted Turner announced he would begin colourising black-and-white motion pictures to make them more pleasing to audiences watching his cable networks. The announcement generated extensive controversy. Touring Turner's colourisation facilities as a member of the Directors Guild, Wise learned that Turner was colourising The Haunting. Wise was able to prevent the colourisation by pointing to his contract, which stated the picture could only be in black-and-white.

Warner Home Video released the film on VHS in pan-and-scan format in 1998. It was released on DVD in its original screen format in 2003. The DVD release included voice-over commentary from Wise, Gidding, Bloom, Harris, Johnson and Tamblyn. The film was released on Blu-ray with the same commentary track on 15 October 2013.

== Remakes ==
A remake of the film was attempted in the early 1990s by horror author Stephen King. King pitched the project under the name Rose Red to Steven Spielberg. The project went into turnaround and a complete script was written, but Spielberg demanded more thrills and action sequences while King wanted more horror. King and Spielberg mutually agreed to shelve the project after several years of work, and King bought back the rights to the script. King returned to the project in 1999, completed a revised script, and successfully pitched the script to producer Mark Carliner. King's revised script aired as a miniseries titled Rose Red in 2002, but bears only superficial resemblance to The Haunting.

The Haunting was formally remade in 1999 under the same title. Horror director Wes Craven initially worked on the project, but abandoned it. This adaptation, directed by Jan de Bont, starred Liam Neeson, Catherine Zeta-Jones, Owen Wilson and Lili Taylor in the roles of Markway (now named Marrow), Theo, Luke and Eleanor.
