= Ettington =

Village in Warwickshire, England

Coordinates: 52.138°N 1.608°W

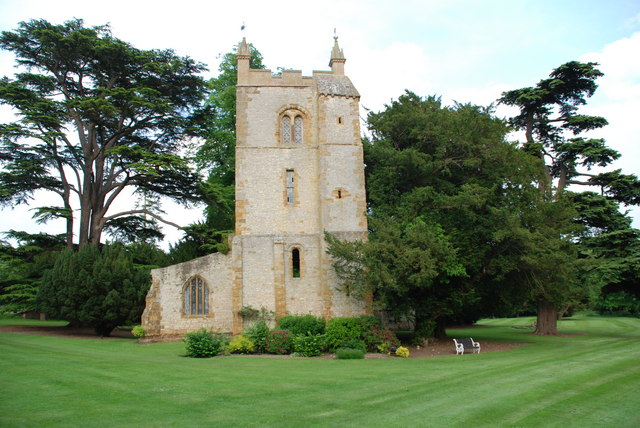
- Remains of 13th-century parish church

- Location within Warwickshire
- Population: 1,171 (2011 Census)
- OS grid reference: SP2648
- Civil parish: Ettington
- District: Stratford-on-Avon
- Shire county: Warwickshire
- Region: West Midlands
- Country: England
- Sovereign state: United Kingdom
- Post town: Stratford-upon-Avon
- Postcode district: CV37
- Dialling code: 01789
- Police: Warwickshire
- Fire: Warwickshire
- Ambulance: West Midlands
- UK Parliament: Stratford-on-Avon
- Website: Ettington Parish Community Website

Ettington is a village and civil parish about 5.5 miles (9 km) south-east of Stratford-upon-Avon in Warwickshire, England. The 2011 Census recorded the parish's population as 1,171. The present village is on the A422 main road linking Stratford and Banbury. The A429 main road linking Warwick and Cirencester used to run through the village, and now uses a bypass just west of it. The Fosse Way Roman road (B4455 road) crosses the A422 0.6 miles (1 km) east of the village.

== Toponym ==
The toponym "Ettington" is derived from the Old English words ea for water and don for ascending ground or meadow. The name has evolved through several forms including Eatenden and Eatington. The latter is still used sometimes by locals. There used to be a Lower and Upper Ettington. Lower Ettington was beside the River Stour but was demolished in the 18th century. The present village is what used to be called Upper Ettington, and is on higher ground about 1 1/4 miles (2 km) to the northeast.

== Manors ==
The Domesday Book of 1086 records two manors. Lower Ettington was an estate of 17 hides whose Norman overlord was Henry de Ferrers. Ferrers' tenant was one Saswalo, whose grandson Sewallis moved to Shirley and took "Shirley" as his surname. The Shirley family has been a major landowner in Ettington ever since. Its present manor house, now known as Ettington Park Hotel, was probably built in the 17th century and extended in the 18th century. In 1824 it was remodelled to designs by the architects Thomas Rickman and Henry Hutchinson. In 1858–62 it was remodelled again to Gothic Revival designs by John Prichard and JP Seddon. It is a Grade I listed building and is now a hotel operated by Hand Picked Hotels. Metro-Goldwyn-Mayer used it as a location in the 1963 horror film The Haunting.

Upper Ettington was an estate of three hides, held by one Turchil of Warwick. Upper Ettington's present manor house is in the village and is 17th century. In the parish 1 mile (1.6 km) north of Upper Ettington was the manor and village of Thornton. Its manor house was built in the 16th century, altered in 1658 and is a Grade II* listed building. The village is now deserted and its site is a scheduled monument. Parliament passed an Inclosure Acts for Ettington in 1795 and its award was made in July 1797. Evelyn Shirley had Lower Ettington village demolished and the medieval preaching cross removed to clear his deer park for landscaping. Its water mill was demolished in 1798.

== Churches ==
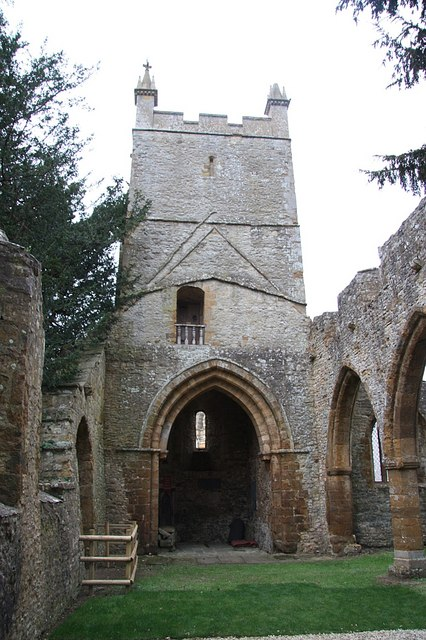
Tower and ruined nave of the medieval parish church, variously called Holy Trinity or St Nicholas

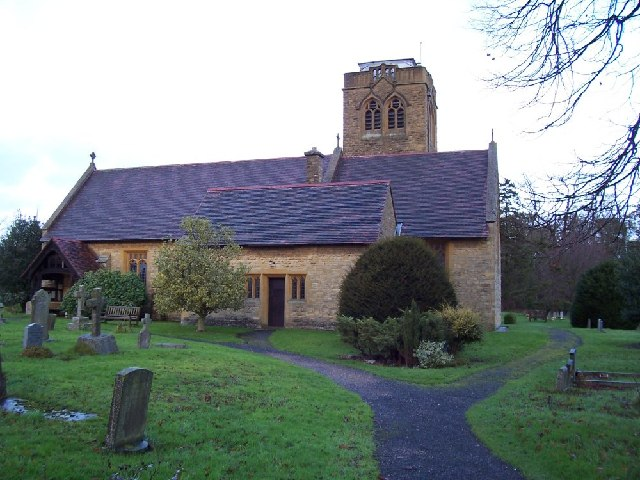
The present Holy Trinity parish church, completed in 1903

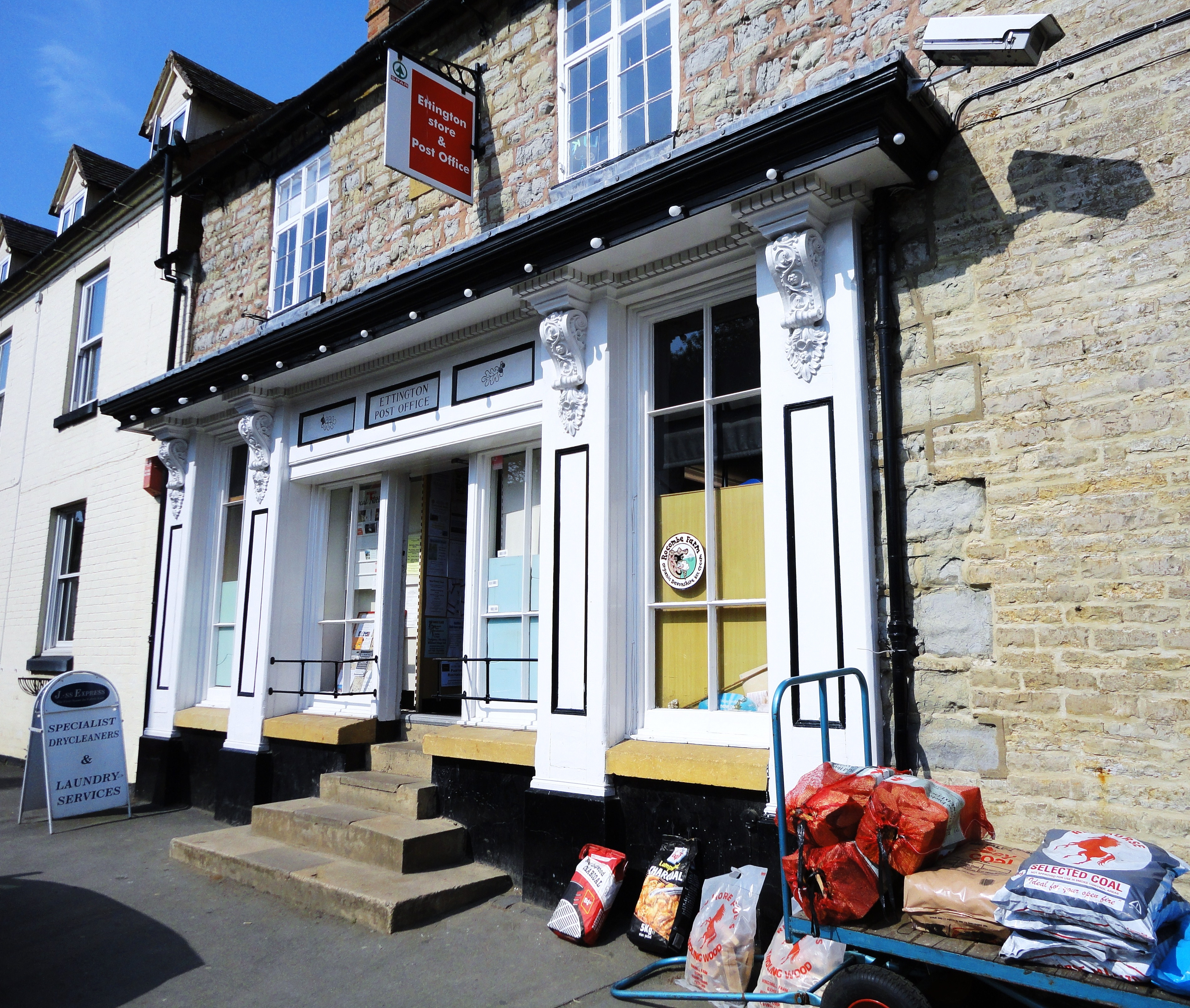
Ettington village shop and post office

=== Church of England ===
Ettington has had three successive parish churches on different sites: the first at Lower Ettington and the second and third at Upper Ettington. In the Middle Ages there was also a chantry chapel at Upper Ettington. The original parish church of the Holy Trinity was in Lower Ettington. It is a 12th-century Norman building with later additions. Early in the 13th century Henry Shirley had an altar to St Nicholas erected in the church. As a result, the church is also known as St Nicholas'. A north aisle with a three-bay arcade was added in the 14th century. The windows on the south side of the nave were replaced in the 17th century. In the 16th-century Dissolution of the Monasteries the chantry at Upper Ettington was dissolved. Its chapel was converted into three almshouses, which were still in use in 1730. The building is now a thatched cottage, Rose Cottage.

In 1794 a parish vestry meeting decided to replace the ancient church in Lower Ettington with a new one in Upper Ettington, which had become the centre of population even before Evelyn Shirley had the old village demolished. In 1795 Parliament passed an act authorising this and in 1798 the new church of St Thomas of Canterbury was consecrated. The 12th-century church was abandoned, but in 1823 its south transept was restored as a mortuary chapel for the Shirleys. The rest of the original church, including its broad and distinctive tower, survives as a roofless ruin. It is a scheduled monument and a Grade I listed building. Its poor state means that it's on Historic England's Heritage at Risk Register . St Thomas' parish church was reputed to be the ugliest in Warwickshire.

A new Gothic Revival church to replace it was begun in 1902 and completed in 1903. The 18th-century church was demolished in 1913, except for the tower and west wall of the nave, which survive as a mortuary chapel. The tower of the present Holy Trinity parish church has a ring of four bells. Edward Newcombe, who had bell foundries at Leicester and Bedford, cast the treble and second bell for the original parish church in 1595. Richard I Purdue, who had bellfoundries in Somerset at Glastonbury and Berwick, cast the third bell in 1624. John Briant of Hertford cast the tenor bell in 1803, five years after St Thomas' church was built. Holy Trinity parish is part of the Stourdene Benefice, which includes also the parishes of Alderminster, Butlers Marston, Halford, Newbold on Stour and Pillerton Hersey.

=== Society of Friends ===
The Society of Friends had members in Ettington by 1664 and their founder George Fox preached at Lambcote farm in the parish in 1678. The Friends' burial ground was established in 1681. The meeting house was completed in 1684 and is a Grade II* listed building.

=== Chapels ===
A Congregational chapel was built in 1804 and enlarged in 1846. It is now a private house. A Methodist chapel was built in 1836 and was still being used for worship in 1949.

== Economic and social history ==
The composer and organist Dr William Croft (1678–1727) was born in Ettington and baptised in the 13th-century parish church. The East and West Junction Railway from Fenny Compton to Stratford-upon-Avon was built through the area and opened on 1 July 1873. Ettington railway station was at Thornton, 1 mile (1.6 km) north of the village. Under The Reshaping of British Railways the station was closed in 1963 followed by the line in 1965.

== Amenities ==
Ettington has one pub, the Chequers. The parish has a Church of England primary school. There is a village shop and post office. Ettington Rovers is an amateur football club that plays in the Leamington Spa and District Sunday League.

== Sources ==
- Pevsner, Nikolaus; Wedgwood, Alexandra (1966). Warwickshire. The Buildings of England. Harmondsworth: Penguin Books. pp. 289–291.
- Salzman, L.F, ed. (1949). A History of the County of Warwick. Victoria County History. Vol. 5: Kington Hundred. London: Oxford University Press for the Institute of Historical Research. pp. 77–84.
