= Leonard Rees =

British newspaper editor

Leonard Rees (25 December 1856 – 19 January 1932) was a British newspaper editor.

Born in Ipswich, Rees attended Ipswich School, before becoming a journalist on a local newspaper. He worked in Northampton, Nottingham and Manchester, before in 1878 moving to London. In 1897, he became the music editor of the Sunday Times, and then in 1901, he was appointed as editor of the newspaper. He held the post until his death in 1932, and under his editorship, the readership of the newspaper increased.

Media offices
Preceded by Rachel Beer	Editor of The Sunday Times; 1901–1932	Succeeded by William W. Hadley
