= Julius Beer =

English businessman

- Born: 1836; Frankfurt, Germany
- Died: 1 March 1880 (aged 43–44); London, England
- Burial place: Highgate Cemetery
- Occupations: Businessman, banker, newspaper baron
- Spouse: Thyrza Beer
- Children: 1
- Relatives: Rachel Sassoon Beer (daughter-in-law)

Julius Beer (1836–1880) was a German-born English businessman, banker and newspaper baron. He owned The Observer from 1870 to 1880.

== Early life ==
Julius Beer was born in 1836 in Frankfurt, Germany.

== Career ==
Beer made his fortune in the London Stock Exchange. He was a member of the London Banking Association.

In 1870, he purchased The Observer newspaper, which he owned until his death in 1880.

== Personal life ==
Beer was married to Thyrza Beer (died 1881). They had a son and a daughter:

- Frederick Arthur Beer (died 1901; married Rachel Sassoon (1858–1927)).
- Ada Sophia Beer (1867–1875, died aged 8 years old) The main sculpture by Henry Hugh Armstead inside the Beer Mausoleum at Highgate Cemetery represents this young girl being protected by an angel.

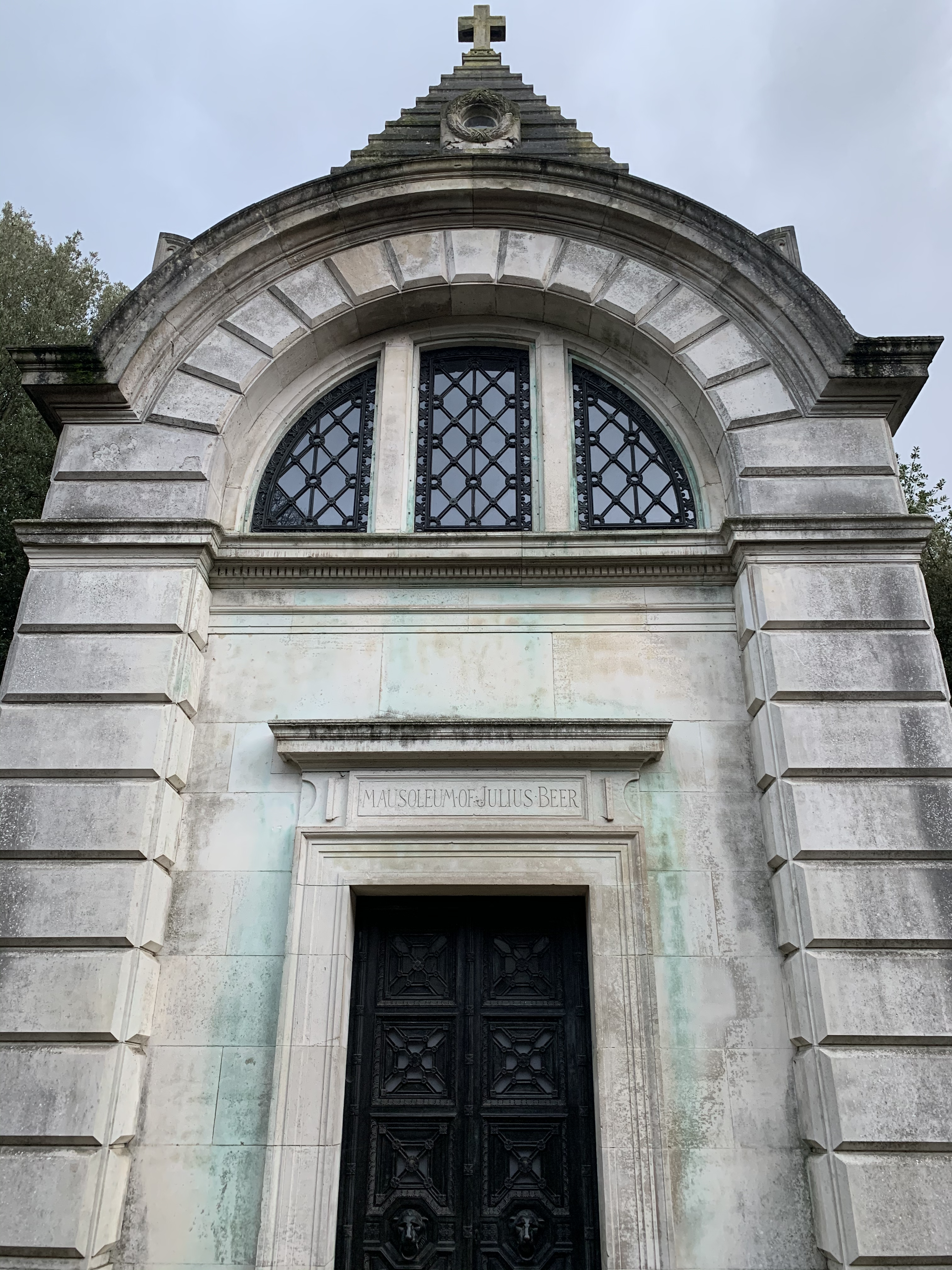
Beer's mausoleum in Highgate Cemetery

Beer died in 1880. His mausoleum in Highgate Cemetery has been listed as Grade II* since 14 May 1974. It was designed by the French/Dutch architect William Bouwens van der Boijen (1801–1907). The English architect John Oldrid Scott (1841–1913) was the executant architect overseeing construction. Scott made some small changes to van der Boijen's design. Scott had, before recent research, been named as the architect in various sources. Interred in it are:

- Ada Sophia Beer (his daughter, d.1875)
- Julius Beer (d.1880)
- Thyrza Beer (his wife, d.1881)
- Arnold Beer (his brother, d.1880)
- Frederick (his son, d.1901)
