= Henry Hugh Armstead =

English sculptor and illustrator

Henry Hugh Armstead RA
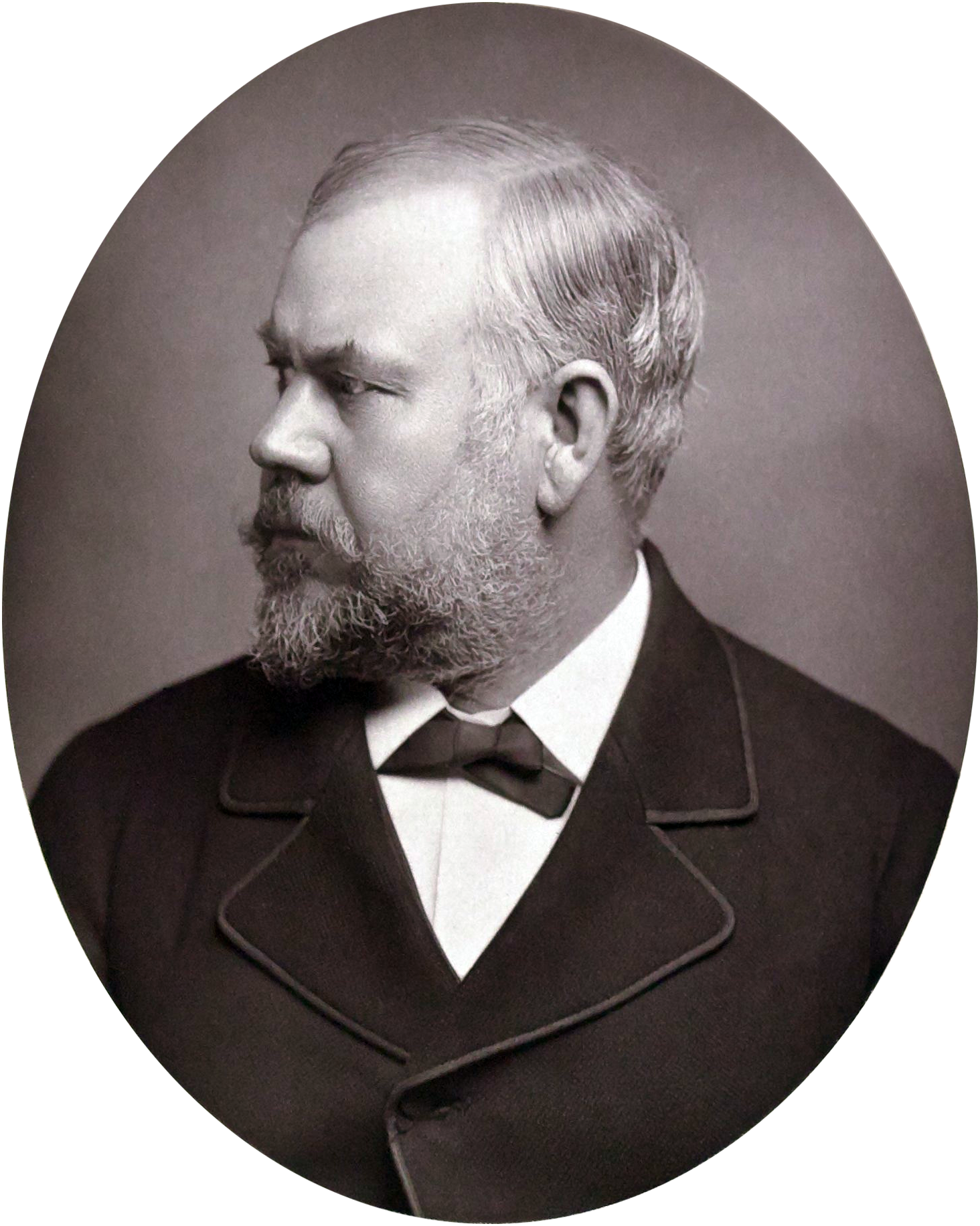
- Armstead in 1879
- Born: 18 June 1828; Bloomsbury, London, England
- Died: 4 December 1905 (aged 77); St John's Wood, London, England
- Resting place: Highgate Cemetery
- Known for: Sculptor and illustrator
- Elected: Royal Academy

Henry Hugh Armstead RA (18 June 1828 – 4 December 1905) was an English sculptor and illustrator, influenced by the Pre-Raphaelites.

== Biography ==
Armstead was born at Bloomsbury in central London, the son of John Armstead, a chaser and heraldic engraver. He trained first under his father, then at the Government School of Design at Somerset House and afterwards at private art schools. He also studied with Edward Hodges Baily.

At the age of eighteen Armstead went to work for the silversmiths Hunt and Roskell. The works he later made there included the Kean Testimonial, a set of nine pieces of silver presented to the actor Charles Kean, and the Outram Shield (1862), made for presentation to Lieutenant-General Sir James Outram. He both made the clay models for the objects and chased the cast silver.

In the late 1850s Armstead was commissioned to make a statue, in Caen stone, of Aristotle for the Oxford University Museum of Natural History. After this he increasingly concentrated on sculpture rather than metalwork. He designed a set of friezes for the exterior of Ettington Hall in Warwickshire, as part of its remodelling in 1858–1862; they were carved by Edward Clarke, Commissions for work at the Palace of Westminster, and the Albert Memorial helped Armstead to establish his reputation. He subsequently executed a large number of public statues, funerary works and other architectural schemes.

At the Palace of Westminster Armstead carved eighteen oak panels in the Queens's Robing Room illustrating the legend of King Arthur beneath a series of murals by William Dyce.

Armstead worked closely with George Gilbert Scott on the Albert memorial from an early stage in the design process, making small scale models of the projected sculptural groups for Scott's architectural model. When it came to the sculpture on the actual monument, he was chosen to make half of the Frieze of Parnassus, a representation of 169 major cultural figures carved out of hard Canpanella marble. Armstead carved the poets and musicians and artists on the south side of the monument, and the painters on the east. The other two sides were executed by John Birnie Philip. Armstead took great care over the details of the subjects, asking surviving friends of Goethe, Beethoven and Mendelsohn for advice, and working from Carl Maria von Weber's death-mask. The sculpture was carved in situ, out of blocks already installed in the podium of the monument, rather than in the studio. The relief was completed, and the sculptors' temporary sheds removed, in 1872. Armstead also made some of the bronze statues symbolising the sciences on the upper levels of the memorial; the others were by Philip.

With John Birnie Philip, Armstead worked on the external sculptural decorations of Scott's colonial office in Whitehall. Armstead also sculpted the large fountain at King's College, Cambridge (1874–1879), incorporating a statue of its founder, Henry IV, and numerous effigies, such as Bishop Wilberforce at Winchester, and Lord John Thynne at Westminster Abbey.

Armstead was elected an Associate of the Royal Academy in 1875 and a full member in 1880.

In 1884 he was chosen to sculpt a monument to Archibald Campbell Tait the late Archbishop of Canterbury for the south transept of Westminster Abbey.

Armstead was living at 44 St Paul's Road, Camden in 1865. He lived at 57 Camden Square from 1871 to 1883. He died at his home 52 Circus Road, St John's Wood in north London on 4 December 1905 and is buried in a family grave on the west side of Highgate Cemetery. Nearby in the west Cemetery is one of his works, in the Julius Beer Mausoleum – a sculpture of Ada Beer, Julius's young daughter, in the arms of an angel.

== Gallery ==
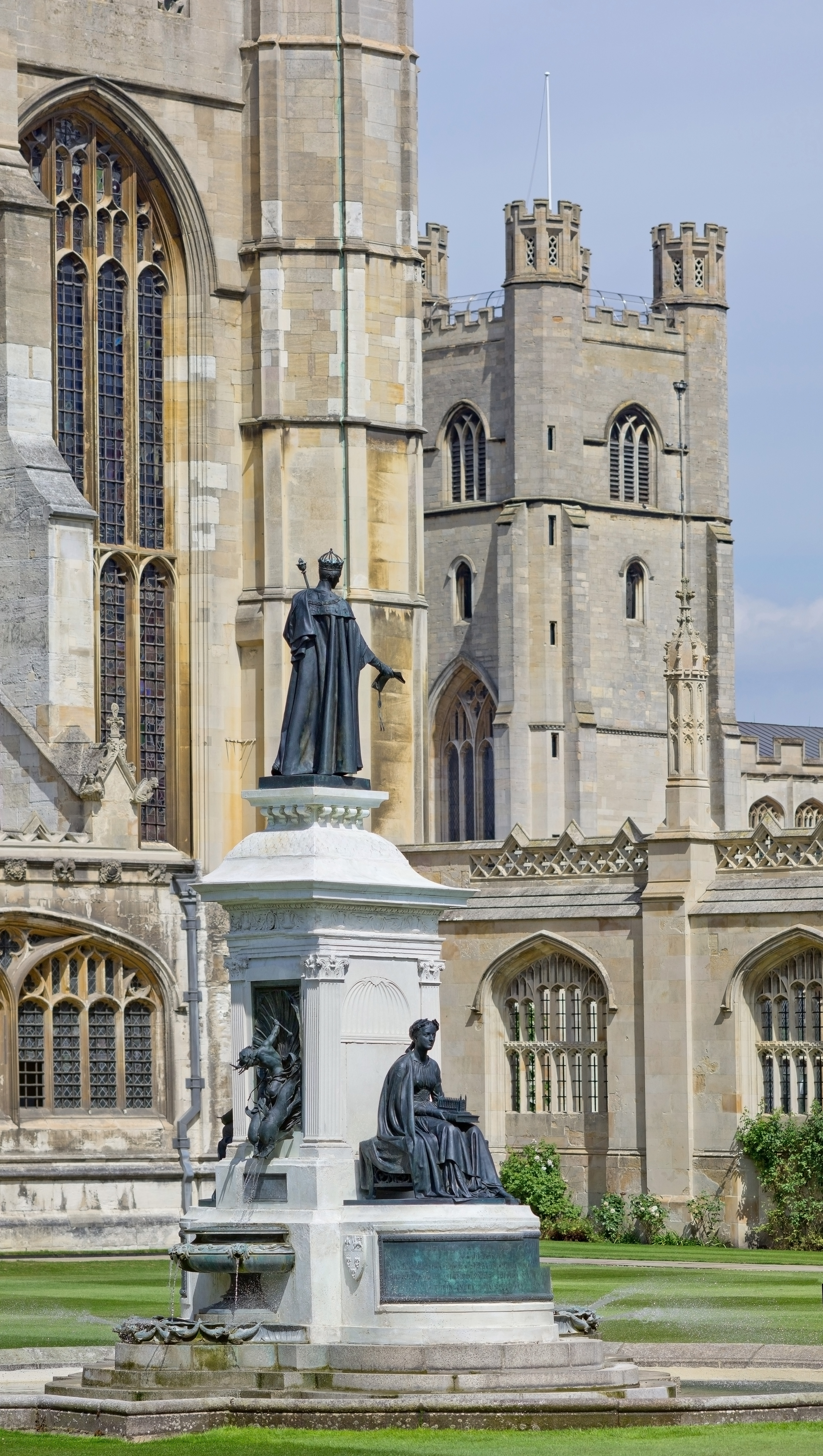
Armstead's 1879 fountain in the Front Court of King's College, Cambridge

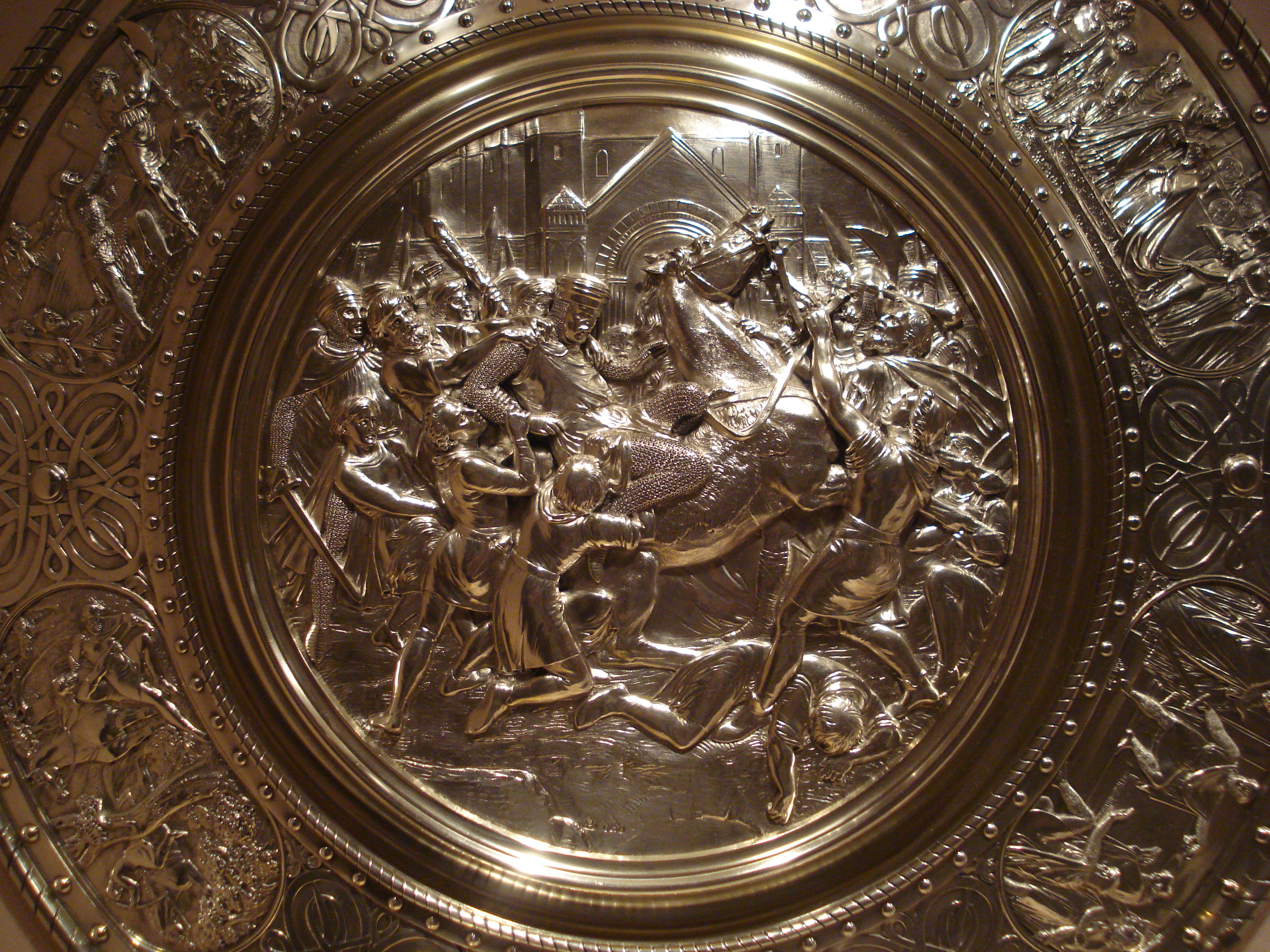
The Stockbridge Cup, designed by Armstead as the prize for a horse race at Nottingham

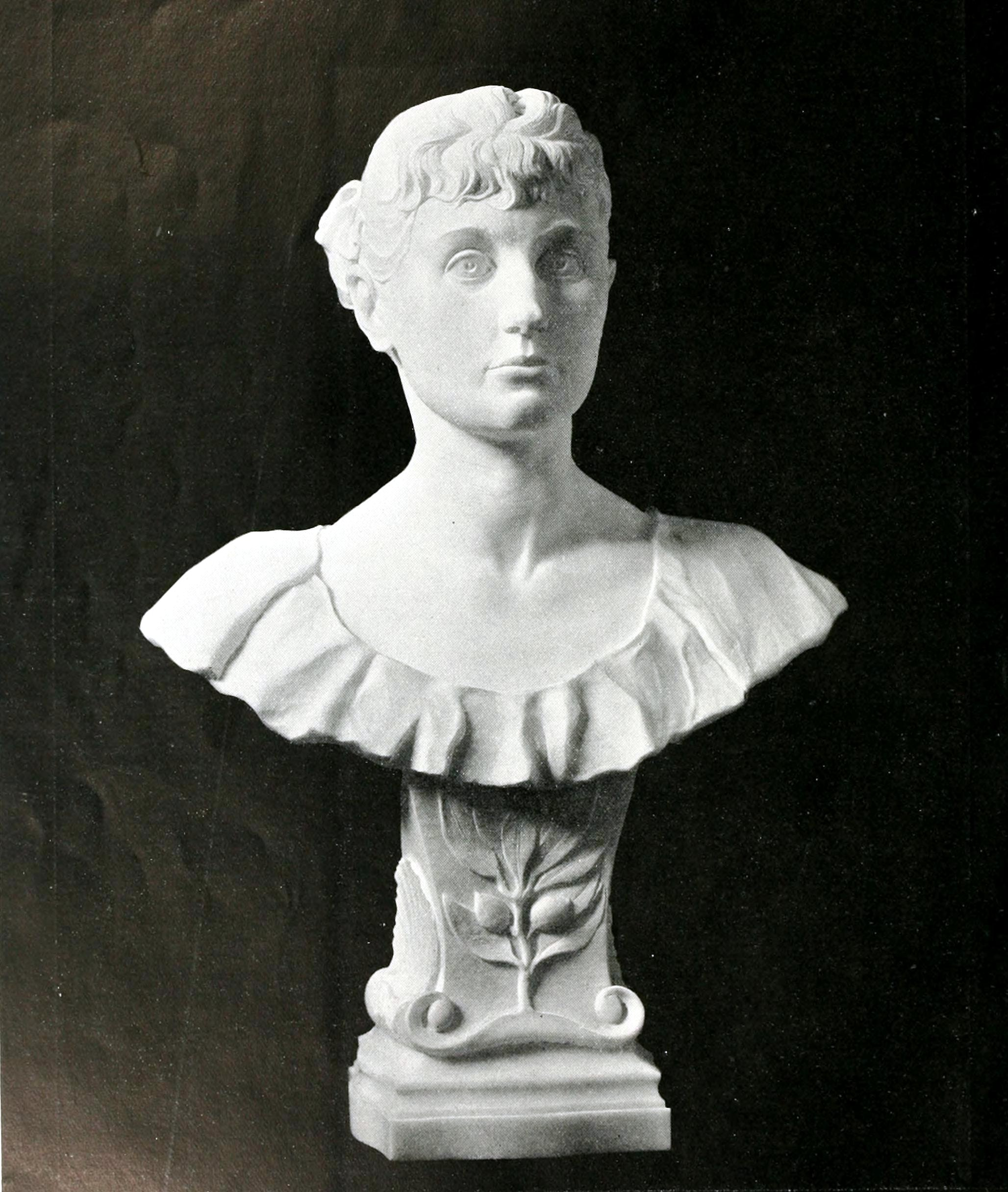
Bust of Mrs. Hugh Wells

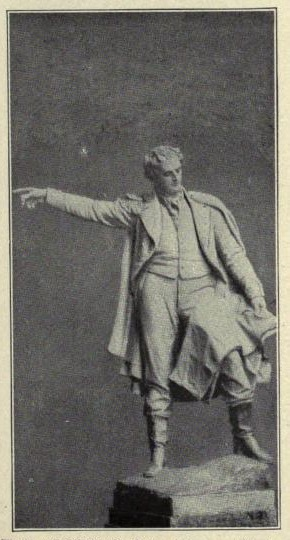
Statue of Lieutenant Waghorn

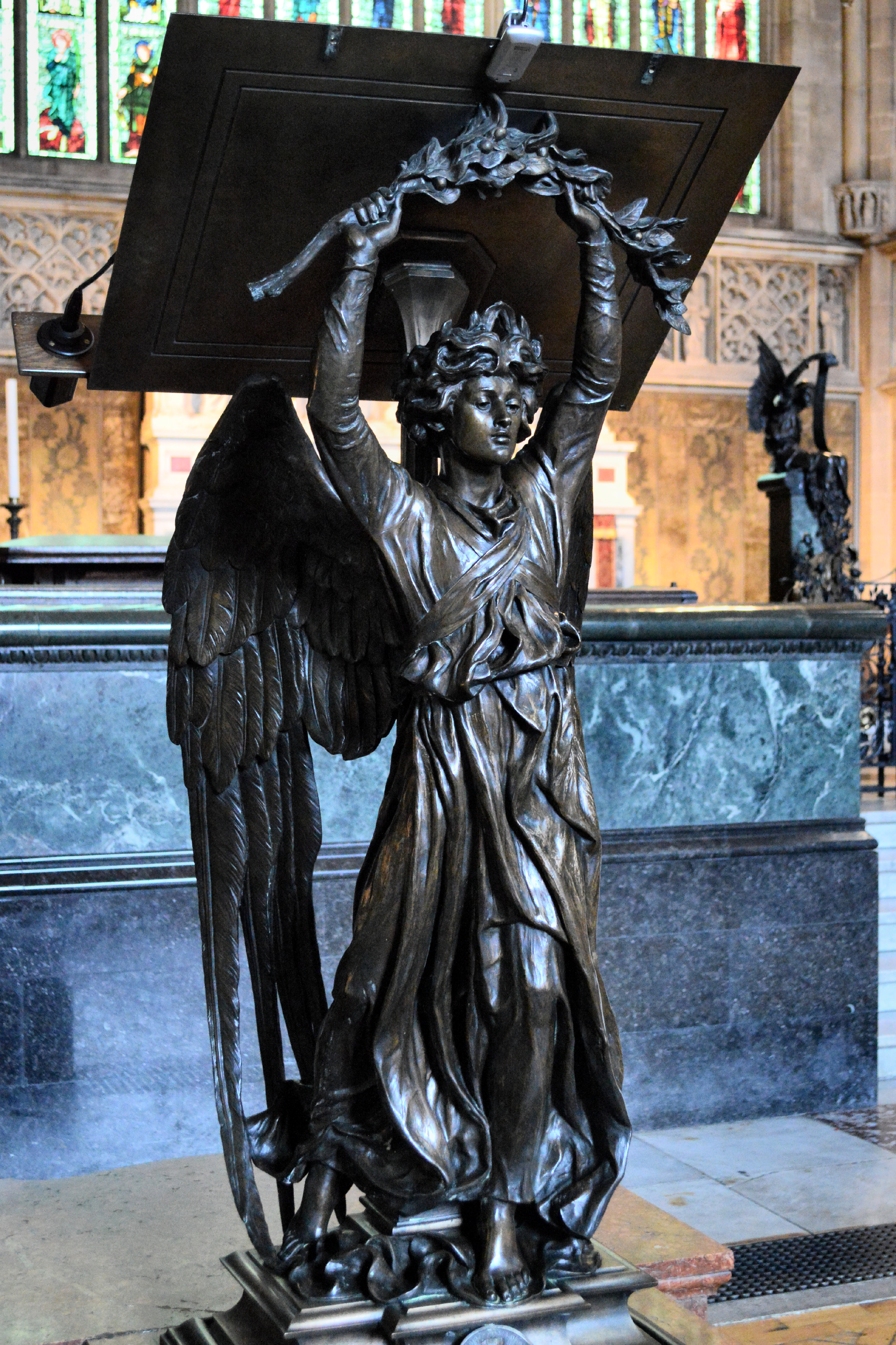
Holy Trinity, Sloane Street, bronze lectern

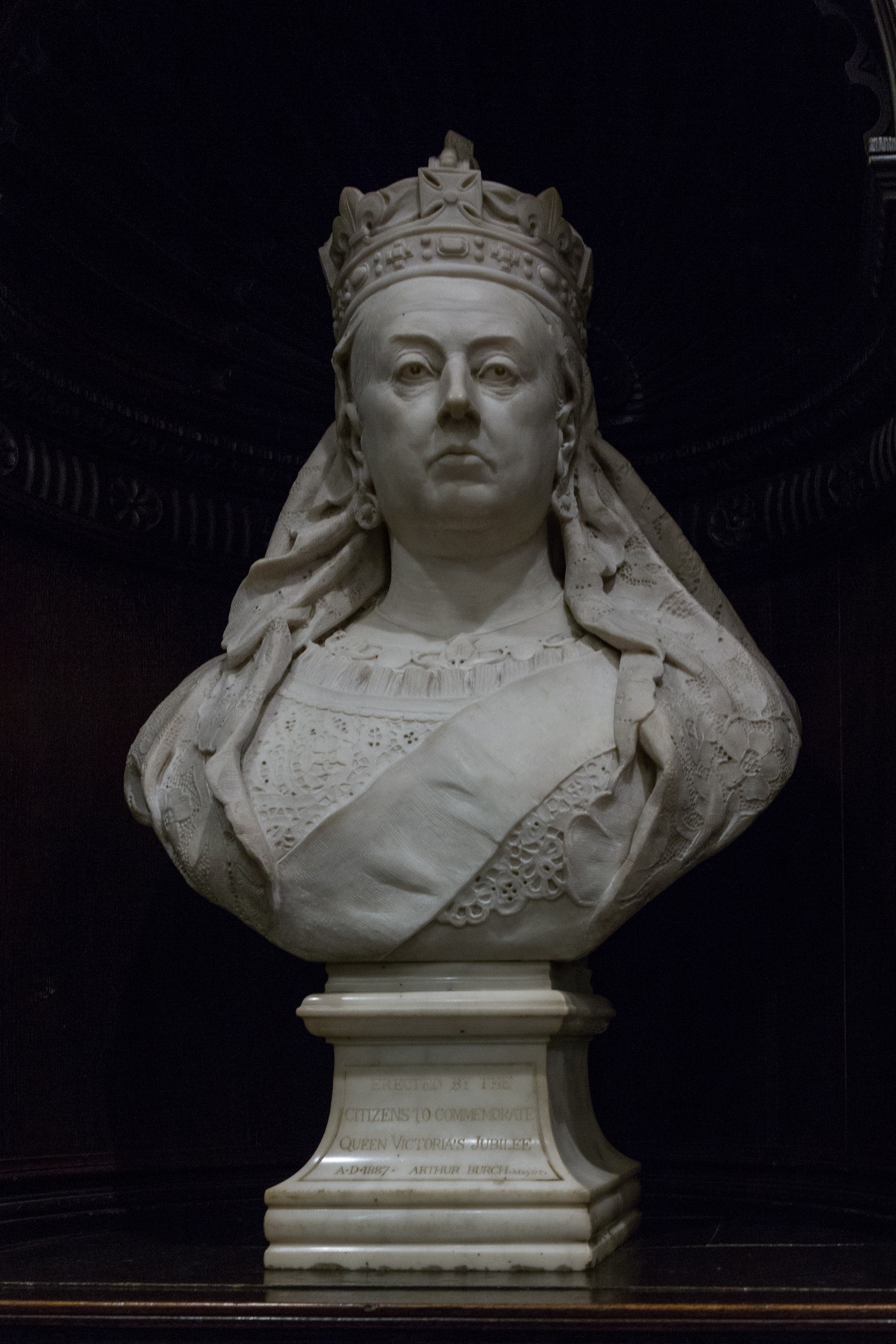
Interior of Exeter Guildhall: bust of Queen Victoria

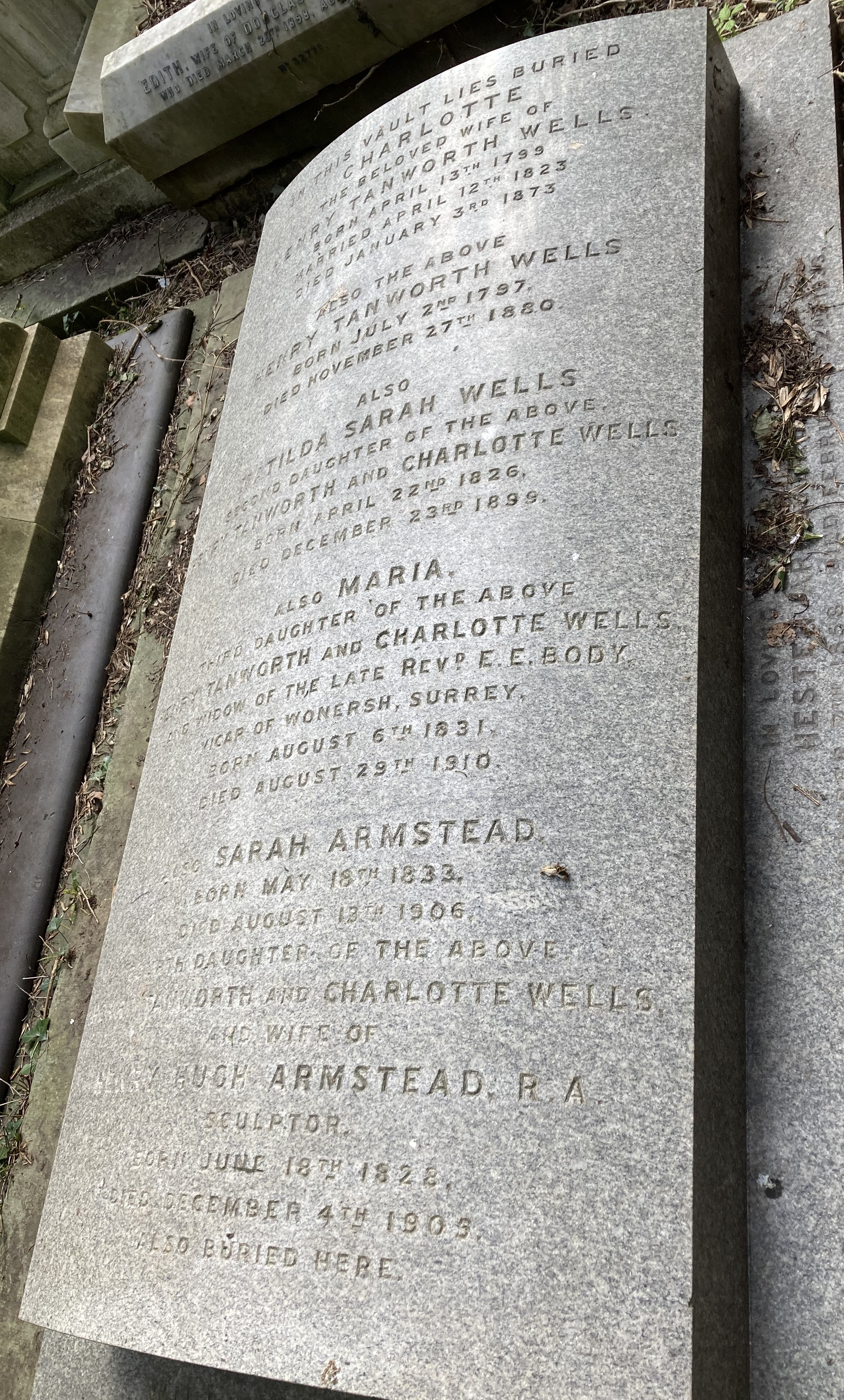
Family grave of Henry Hugh Armstead in Highgate Cemetery
