= John Prichard =

British architect (1817–1886)

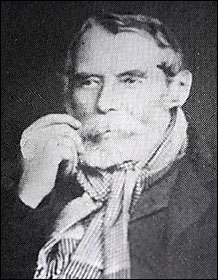
- John Prichard
- Born: 6 May 1817; Llangan, Glamorgan, Wales
- Died: 13 October 1886 (aged 69); Cardiff, Wales

John Prichard (6 May 1817 – 13 October 1886) was a Welsh architect in the neo-Gothic style. As diocesan architect of Llandaff, he was involved in the building or restoration of many churches in south Wales.

== Personal history ==
John Prichard was born in Llangan, near Cowbridge, Wales on 6 May 1817, the twelfth son of the rector Richard Prichard, who served as vicar-choral of Llandaff for 35 years. He was descended from the Prichard family of Collenna. John Prichard trained as an architect under Thomas Larkins Walker, and as a result was deeply influenced by the ideas of Augustus Pugin; much of his work was in a neo-Gothic style.

He established a practice in Llandaff, Cardiff, becoming 'Resident Diocesan Architect' in December 1844. Between 1852 and 1863 he was in partnership with John Pollard Seddon. Many of his major commissions were restoration works, most famously for Llandaff Cathedral (1843–69); Prichard and Seddon worked on the cathedral from the 1840s until 1869, when the south-western tower was completed (to Prichard's own design). Much of their work was destroyed by enemy bombing during the Second World War.

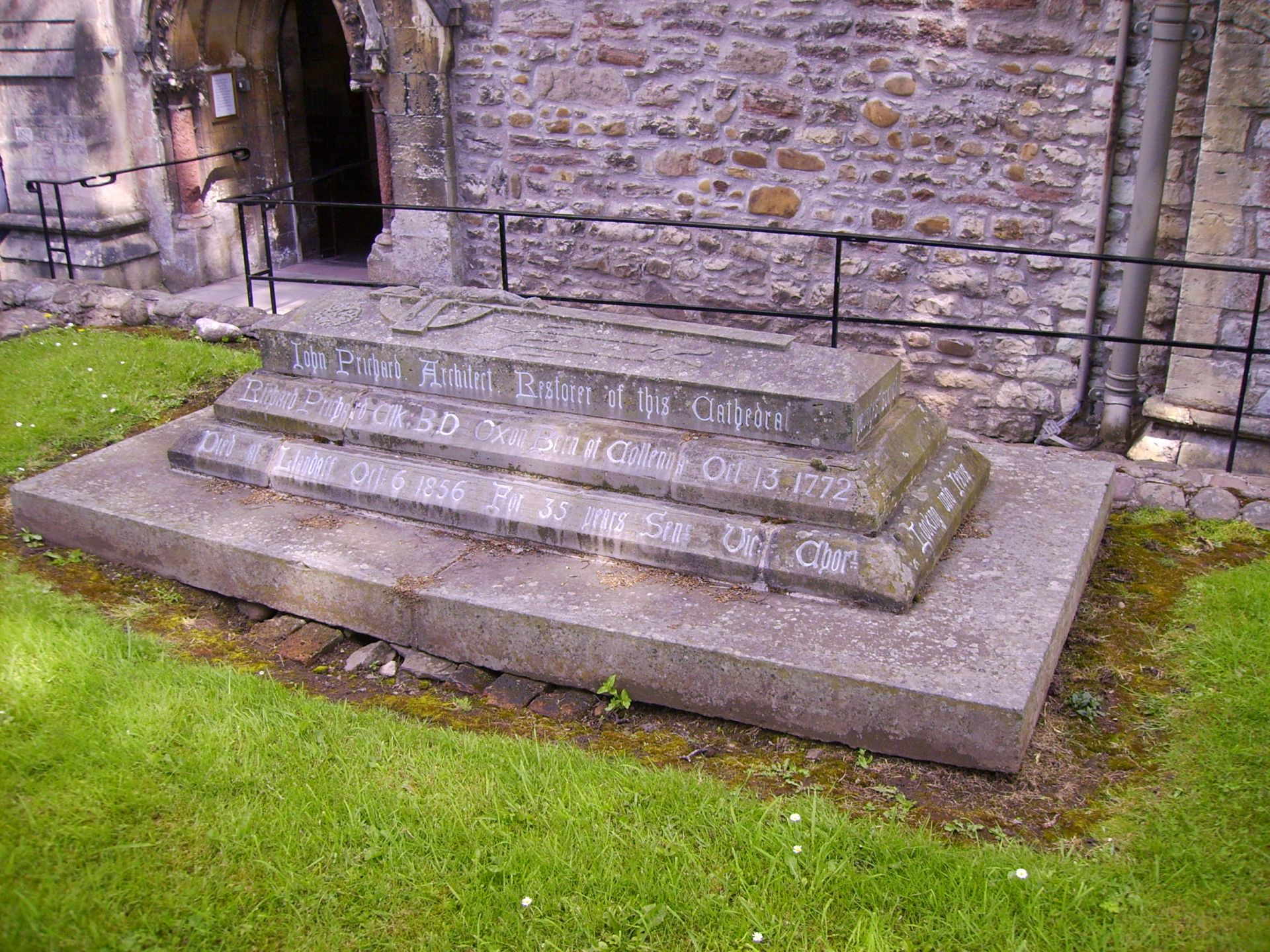
The grave of Prichard in the grounds of Llandaff Cathedral

Prichard died, unmarried and childless, at the age of 69, and is buried on the south side of the cathedral. On Prichard's death, Seddon succeeded him as diocesan architect.

== Notable projects ==
The Prichard Bridge, named after the architect, was built in about 1880 to allow carriages to cross the feeder channel between the River Taff and the Llandaff corn mill. It is a Grade II listed building. The mill was demolished in about 1932 and the stream no longer exists; the lower part of the bridge is buried and no longer visible.

One of the few secular buildings on which Prichard & Seddon worked was Ettington Park, where Prichard's brother Richard was vicar. Prichard also designed Nazareth House, Cardiff, a Catholic almshouse built on land donated by John Crichton-Stuart, 3rd Marquess of Bute. The chapel of the latter was not Prichard's work; it was added later.

== Buildings ==
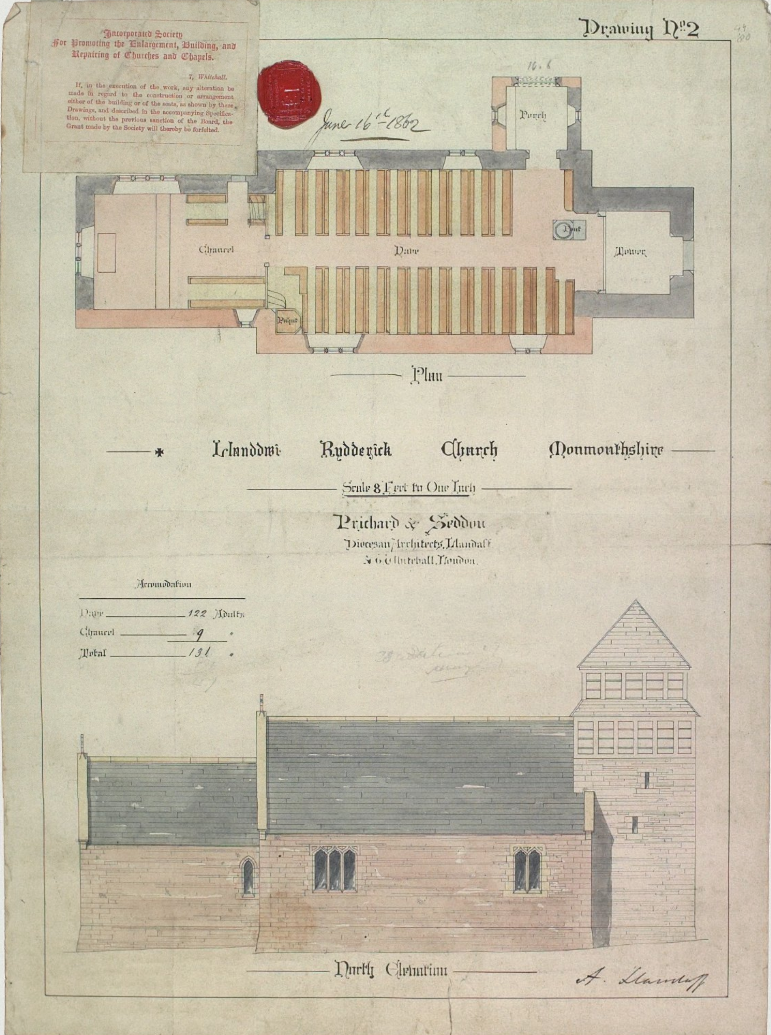
Drawings for the restoration of the Church of St David, Llanddewi Rhydderch (1862)

- Llandaff Cathedral, Llandaff (1843–1869) restoration.
- Church of St Swithin, Ganarew (1850)
- St Michael's Church, Cwmafan (1851).
- Church of the Holy Cross, Cowbridge (1850–1852) restoration.
- The Church of St Julius and Aaron, Llanharan (1856–1859) restoration.
- St Mary's Church, Aberavon rebuilding
- Ettington Park, near Stratford upon Avon (1858–1862) restoration.
- Old Probate Registry, Llandaff (1860-1863)
- Church of St John, Llandenny (1860-5) with John Pollard Seddon
- Church of St David, Llanddewi Rhydderch, Monmouthshire (1862–1863) restoration
- St Mary's on Chapel Hill, Tintern, Monmouthshire (1863–1868) restoration
- St Margaret's Church, Roath (1870) commissioned by the Marquess of Bute
- St Crallo, Coychurch (1871) restoration
- St Michael and All Angels, Mitchel Troy (1873-1876) rebuilding commissioned by the 8th Duke of Beaufort
- Church of SS. Illtyd, Gwynno & Tyfodwg, Llantrisant (1874) restoration
- Nazareth House, Cardiff (1875)
- St Catharine's Church, Baglan (1875–1882) restoration
- Church of St Thomas a Becket, Monmouth (1876)
- St Cadfan's Church, Tywyn (1877) restoration.
- Racquets and Fives Club (now Jackson Hall), Cardiff (1878)
- Prichard Bridge, Llandaff (c.1880)
- St Mary's Church, Whitchurch, Cardiff (1884)
- St Mary's Nolton, Bridgend (completed 1877) build
- Elerch Vicarage

== Bibliography ==
- Davies, John; Jenkins, Nigel; Menna, Baines; Lynch, Peredur I., eds. (2008). The Welsh Academy Encyclopaedia of Wales. Cardiff: University of Wales Press. ISBN 978-0-7083-1953-6.
- Newman, John (1995). Glamorgan. London: Penguin Group. ISBN 0140710566.
