= Jackson Hall, Cardiff =

Jackson Hall
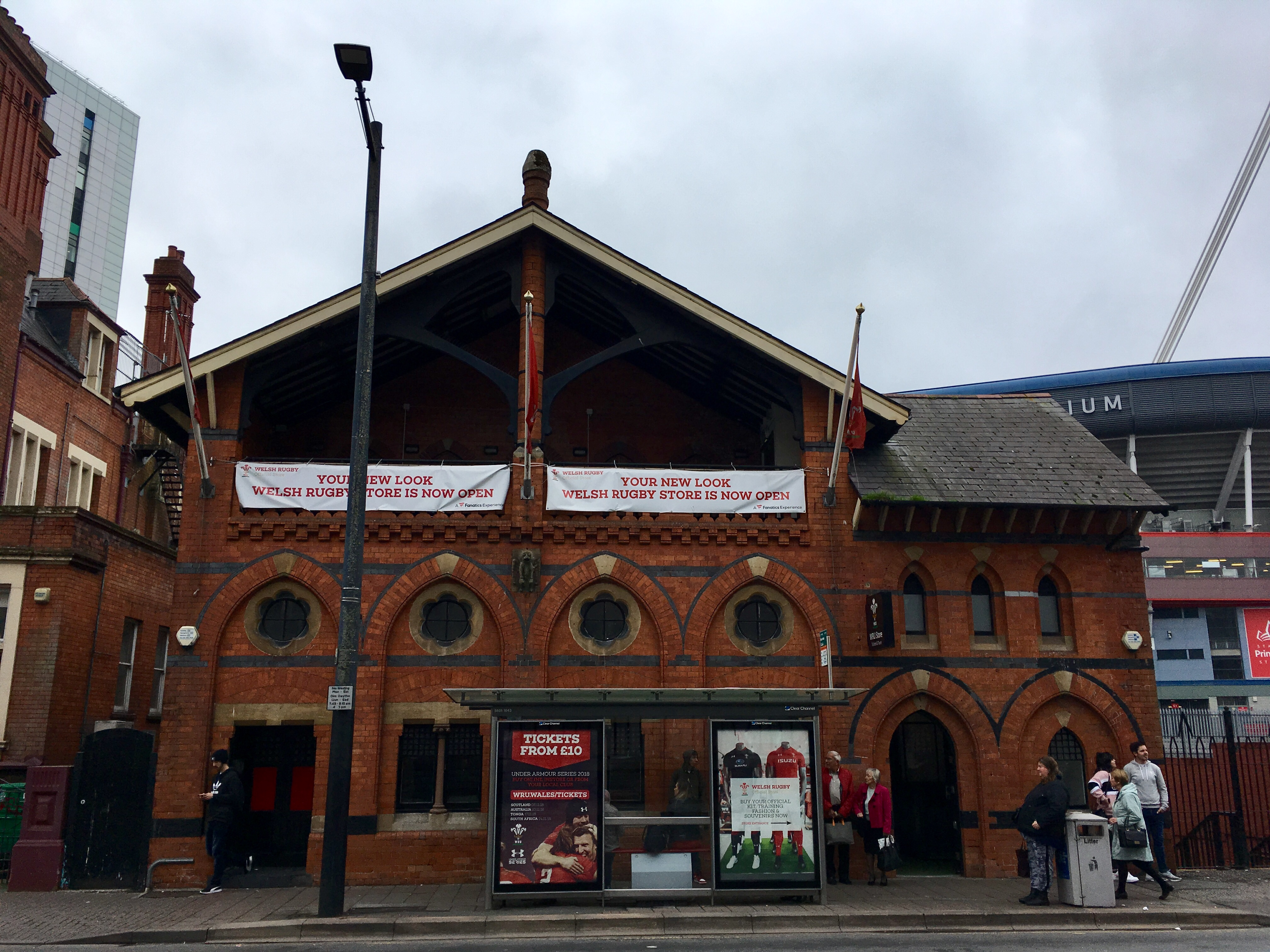
- "Striking piece of High Victorian Gothic polychromy"

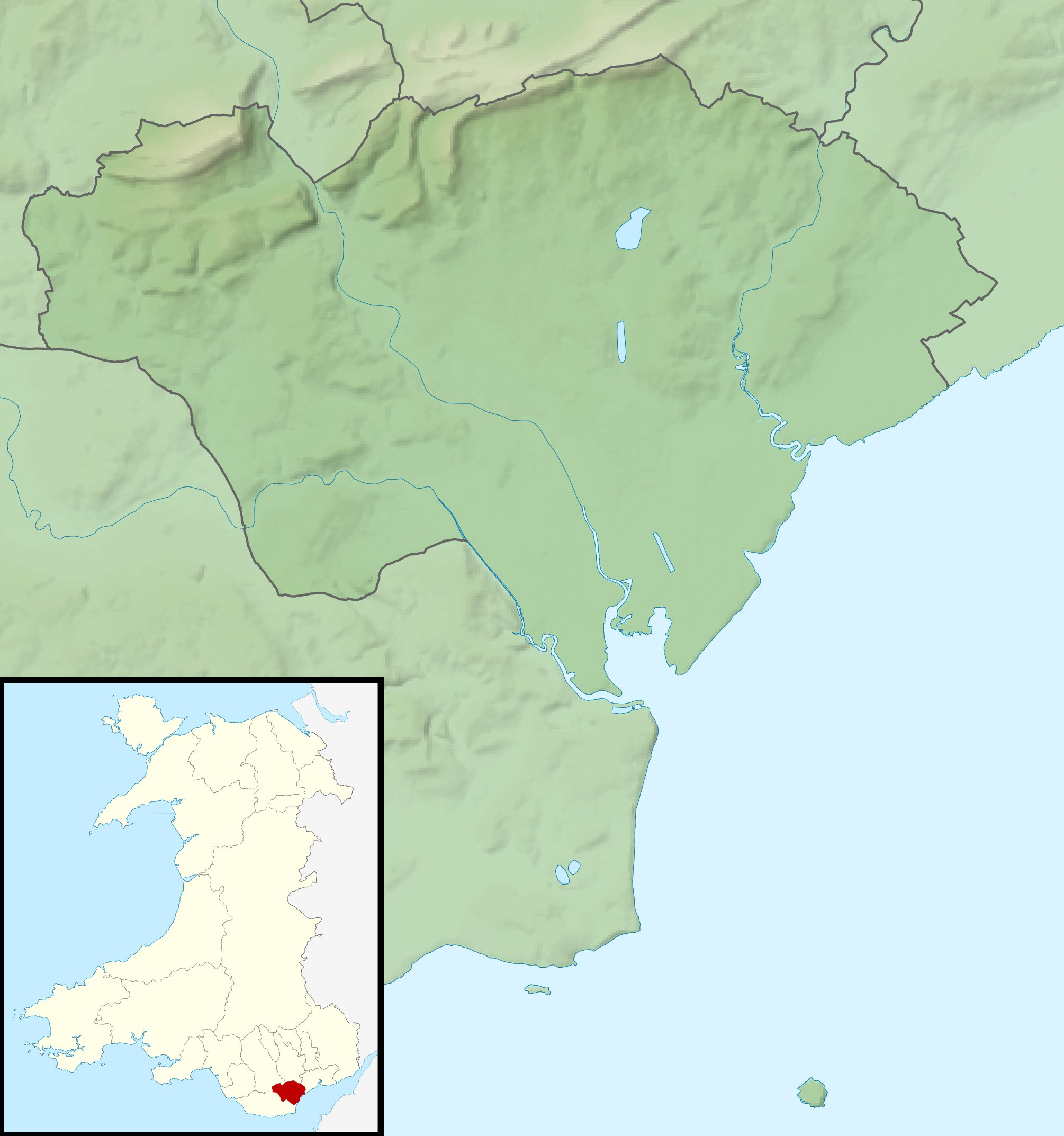
- Location within Cardiff
- 51°28′45″N 3°10′51″W
- Type: Sports club
- Location: Cardiff

History
- Built: 1878

Site notes
- Architect: George Robinson
- Architectural style: Gothic Revival

Listed Building – Grade II
- Official name: Jackson Hall
- Designated: 19 May 1975
- Reference no.: 13827

Jackson Hall is a Grade II listed building on Westgate Street, in central Cardiff, Wales. It was designed by John Prichard and George Robinson and built in 1878. It stands adjacent to the Cardiff and Country Club. Behind Jackson Hall is the Millennium Stadium.

The hall was opened as the Racquets and Fives Club hall as a home for players of racquets, squash and lawn tennis and fives at a cost of £2,300. The cost was met by the Bute Estate under the guidance of John Crichton-Stuart, 3rd Marquess of Bute.

The hall was used as Cardiff's Juvenile Employment Bureau until 1967 and subsequently as a polling station, and office for employment benefit registrants. Demolition of the hall and its replacement by the re-siting of the Ebenezer Welsh Congregational Church in Charles Street was vetoed in 1975 by John Morris, the Secretary of State for Wales, and it was subsequently listed Grade II for its architectural merit, as was the Ebenezer Congregational Church. A 99-year lease on the hall was sold to the Barry firm Hamard Catering Ltd. in October 1978, and it subsequently re-opened as Jackson's, a health club. The hall was branch of Yates's Wine Lodge for several years until 2007, when it became the home of the Welsh Rugby Union gift shop.
