= St David's Church, Llanddewi Rhydderch =

Coordinates: 51.8115°N 2.9444°W

Church of St David
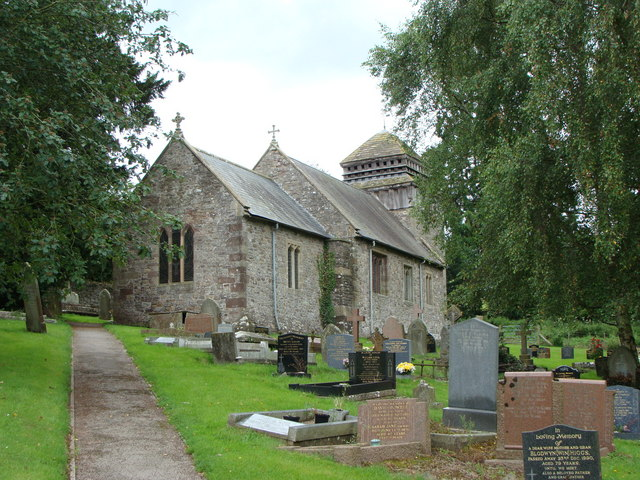
- "a medieval church sensitively restored"

- Location in Monmouthshire
- Location: Llanddewi Rhydderch, Monmouthshire
- Country: Wales
- Denomination: Church in Wales

History
- Status: parish church
- Founded: early 14th century

Architecture
- Functional status: Active
- Heritage designation: Grade II*
- Designated: 9 January 1956
- Architectural type: Church

Administration
- Diocese: Monmouth
- Archdeaconry: Monmouth
- Deanery: Abergavenny
- Parish: Llanddewi Rhydderch

Clergy
- Vicar: The Reverend J Humphries

The Church of St David is a parish church in Llanddewi Rhydderch, Monmouthshire, Wales, with origins in the 12th century; the tower base may date from this time. The fabric of the current building is 14th–15th century in date, with a Victorian restoration by John Pollard Seddon in 1862 and 1863. It remains an active parish church.

== History ==
The origins of the building are Norman, with the base of the tower, and some of its lancet windows appearing to date from this time. The body of the church is later, of the 14th and 15th centuries. J. P. Seddon undertook a sensitive restoration in 1862–63. There have been few alterations since this time and the church remains an active church in the parish of Llanddewi Rhydderch.

== Architecture and description ==
The church is built of Old Red Sandstone. The building comprises a nave, chancel, porch and a tower with a "pyramidal cap of "typical Border design". The church is a Grade II* listed building, its listing record describing it as a "medieval church sensitively restored".
