= Ettington Park Hotel =

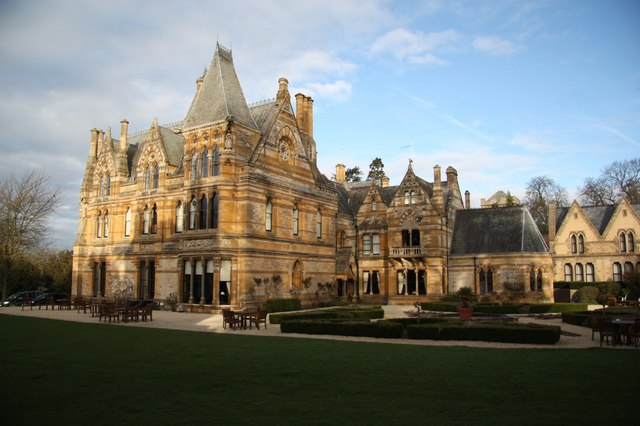
- Interactive map of Ettington Park Hotel
- Type: House
- Location: Ettington, Warwickshire, England
- Coordinates: 52.1238°N 1.6400°W
- Built: 1858–1862
- Architect: John Prichard, John Pollard Seddon
- Architectural style: Neo-Gothic
- Governing body: Private

Listed Building – Grade I
- Official name: Ettington Park Hotel
- Designated: 5 April 1967
- Reference no.: 1382586

Ettington Park, in Ettington, Warwickshire, England, is a 19th-century country house with earlier origins. The historic home of the Shirley family, whose ownership dates from the time of the Domesday Book, the house was remodelled between 1858 and 1862 for Evelyn Shirley. Shirley's architect was John Prichard, although the involvement of Prichard's long-time partner John Pollard Seddon is disputed. The Grade I listed building, described by Chris Pickford and Nikolaus Pevsner as "the most important and impressive High Victorian house in the county", is now a hotel.

== History ==
The site was occupied by a manor house for several centuries before the construction of the current building. Before the reign of Henry III, the nearby estate of Lower Ettington was the principal seat of the Ferrers family, who later moved their seat to Shirley, Derbyshire. In earlier centuries, the grounds were a deerpark. According to Alice Dryden:

Sir Ralph Shirley leased the manor in 1509 to John and Agnes Underhill, for a term of 80 years. His son, Francis, made another lease for a term of 100 years to the same family in 1541, the lease ending in 1641. During Francis Shirley's time the manor house may have been rebuilt, or at least modernised. The lease of Ettington came to an end in 1641 in the lifetime of Sir Charles Shirley, who entered into possession of it in 1642. Extensive repairs occurred under him; a large part of the building was taken down and a smaller one constructed with the original materials. About 1740, and again in 1767, additions were made by George Shirley. His grandson, Evelyn John Shirley, made alterations in 1824. It was restored by John Prichard for Evelyn Shirley in 1858–63, in the advanced Early English Style.

Now run as a hotel, it belongs to the Handpicked Hotels Group.

== Architecture and description ==
Ettington Park is located to the southwest of the village of Ettington, just north of the village of Newbold on Stour. It is set in 40 acres (0.16 km^{2}), passed by the River Stour. Ettington Park is considered "the most important and impressive High Victorian house in the county".

The hall is an 1858–62 re-modelling of an earlier house, probably mid-17th-century with mid-18th-century additions. Pickford and Pevsner, in their 2016 Warwickshire are certain that the Victorian re-modelling was the sole work of John Prichard. Historic England considers that John Pollard Seddon, Prichard's long-time partner from 1852 to 1863, was also involved. In the late 20th century, further alterations and additions were carried out.

The house is constructed in yellow and grey banded limestone ashlar with a roof of stone slate. The style is Neo Gothic, the architectural historian Charles Eastlake noting significant Ruskinian influences. Eastlake provides support for Pickford and Pevsner in attributing the house, called Eatington Park in the mid-19th century, solely to Prichard. The house is an E-shape plan, with two storeys and attics. The interior retains much of its original early and mid Victorian configuration and fittings. The Staircase Hall is of 1810–11, while the Library was decorated in 1820. The Long Gallery and the Great Drawing Room are part of Prichard's remodelling.

== Filming location ==
Ettington Park was used for exterior shots of "Hill House" in the 1963 horror film The Haunting. The chapel in the grounds was also used for filming in the 1980 version of The Watcher in the Woods.

== Sources ==
- Dryden, Alice (1908). Memorials of Old Warwickshire (Public domain ed.). Bemrose & Sons, Limited. p. 64.
- Eastlake, Charles Locke (2012). A History of the Gothic Revival: an Attempt to Show How the Taste for Mediæval Architecture, which Lingered in England during the Two Last Centuries Has since Been Encouraged and Developed. Cambridge University Press. ISBN 978-1-108-05191-0. OCLC 908267827.
- Pickford, Chris; Pevsner, Nikolaus (2016). Warwickshire. The Buildings of England. Yale University Press. ISBN 978-0-300-21560-1.
- Rigby, Jonathan (2000). English Gothic: A Century of Horror Cinema. London: Reynolds & Hearn. ISBN 1-903111-01-3.
- Ward Lock & Co (1882). Ward and Lock's pictorial guide to Warwickshire (Public domain ed.). Ward Lock & Co Ltd.
