= Frank Jenkins =

Frank or Francis Jenkins or Frances Jenkins may refer to:

- Frances C. Jenkins (1826-1915), American evangelist and temperance worker
- Frank Jenkins (footballer) (1918–1987), Australian rules footballer
- Frank Jenkins (musician) (1888–?), American fiddler and banjo player
- Frank Jenkins (ice hockey) (1859–1930), Canadian ice hockey player, founder of the Ottawa Hockey Club
- Frank Jenkins (priest) (1923–2011), Dean of Monmouth
- Frank Lynn Jenkins (1870–1927), British sculptor
- Francis Jenkins (East India Company officer), Commissioner of Assam 1834–1861

== See also ==
- SS C. Francis Jenkins
