= Lister Tonge =

British Anglican priest

Lister Tonge, AKC (born 23 December 1951) is a Roman Catholic priest and former British Anglican vicar. He was Dean of Monmouth from 2012 until the style of the post was changed to Dean of Newport in 2018. He retired as Dean in 2020.

== Early life and education ==
Tonge was born on 23 December 1951 in Oldham, Lancashire, England. He was educated at Heywood Grammar School, Salford Grammar School, King's College London and Loyola University Chicago. He is the second child of Edward Tonge and Dorothy Tonge (née Clough).

== Ordained ministry ==
Tonge was ordained as an Anglican in 1975. After a curacy at Liverpool Parish Church he was Precentor of Johannesburg Cathedral from 1978 to 1979. From then until 1991 he was a member of the Community of the Resurrection. He was then resident Chaplain to the Community of St John the Baptist until his appointment as Dean.

He, alongside Archdeacons Jonathan Williams and Ambrose Mason, raised grievances - which they termed "concerns about the well-being" - against the Bishop of Monmouth, Richard Pain. Despite an internal investigation which determined that there was insufficient evidence to proceed with a formal disciplinary tribunal and finding "there was no case to answer", the three men remained unsatisfied. Tonge, Williams and Mason then wrote a letter to the Archbishop, John Davies, and all Welsh bishops expressing how unhappy they were with the outcome. A process of mediation was then put into place, they withdrew from this in December 2018 when a press release from the Church in Wales seemed to confirm the breakdown-in-relationships rumours. Bishop Pain later retired on ill health. The Archbishop, who would not take questions from clergy, claimed in a meeting that the three senior clerics had behaved properly throughout.

He retired as Dean in 2020.

Following his conversion to Catholicism, he was ordained a Roman Catholic transitional deacon on 13 December 2023 at St Francis Xavier Catholic Church, Everton by Archbishop Malcolm McMahon OP, Archbishop of Liverpool. He was ordained priest by Archbishop McMahon on 13 July 2024 at the Metropolitan Cathedral.

Church in Wales titles
| Preceded by Jeremy Hugh Winston | Dean of Monmouth (later Newport); 2012 – 2020 | Succeeded by Ian Black |
