= Gareth Lewis =

Anglican priest

David Gareth Lewis (13 August 1931 – 27 May 1997 was an Anglican priest in the second half of the twentieth century.

Lewis was educated at Cyfarthfa Grammar School, Bangor University, Oriel College, Oxford and St Michael's College, Llandaff. He was ordained deacon in 1960 and priest in 1961. After a curacy in Neath he was Vice-Principal of Salisbury Theological College from 1963 to 1969; Dean of Belize from 1969 to 1978; Vicar of St Mark, Newport from 1978 to 1982; a canon residentiary of Newport Cathedral from 1982 to 1990; and Dean of Monmouth from 1990 to 1996.

Church in Wales titles
Preceded by Frank Jenkins	Dean of Monmouth; 1990–1996	Succeeded by Richard Fenwick
