= John Phillips (priest) =

Dean of Monmouth

John Leoline Phillips (2 August 1879 – 31 March 1947) was the Dean of Monmouth from 1931 until 1946.

Phillips was born in Radyr. He was educated at Christ College, Brecon, and Keble College, Oxford; and ordained in 1909. He was a schoolmaster at St Paul's West Kensington from 1905 until 1921 (also serving in the RAOC during World War I) when he became Headmaster of his old school, a post he held until his appointment as Dean. He died in Newport.

Church in Wales titles
Preceded by Inaugural appointment	Dean of Monmouth; 1993–2001	Succeeded by Joseph Gwyn Davies
