= Ian Black (priest) =

British Anglican priest (born 1962)

Ian Christopher Black (born 1962) is a British Anglican priest who has served as Dean of Newport since 2021.

Black was born and grew up in Stratford-upon-Avon and was head chorister at Holy Trinity Church (Shakespeare's church). Educated at Kineton High School and Binswood Hall (North Leamington School), he went on to study at Christ Church College, Canterbury, then affiliated to the University of Kent. After a career in tax, both with the Inland Revenue and a firm of chartered accountants, he trained for ordination at Lincoln Theological College, studying for a Master of Divinity degree at the University of Nottingham. Black was made deacon at Petertide 1993 (27 June) by Richard Llewellin, Bishop of Dover, at Canterbury Cathedral and ordained priest in 1994.

Black served his title at All Saints Church, Maidstone (1993–96). After this he was priest in charge of Brents and Davington with Oare and Luddenham (1996–2002), during which time he was also a minor canon of Canterbury Cathedral and assistant director of post-ordination training. He moved north to become vicar of St Mary's Church, Whitkirk (2002–12) and capitular canon of Ripon Cathedral (2008–12). After that he was vicar of St John the Baptist Church, Peterborough (2012–21) and a residentiary canon of Peterborough Cathedral (2012–21), serving also as Rural Dean of Peterborough for five years. He was appointed as Dean of Newport and installed on 22 May 2021.

Black is a spiritual writer and director. His publications include three books of prayers: Prayers for all occasions (SPCK 2011), Intercessions for Years A, B & C (SPCK 2009) and Intercessions for the Calendar of Saints and Holy Days (SPCK 2005). His most recent book, Follow me: living the sayings of Jesus, was published by Sacristy Press in 2017 and he has written a hymn, "Christ the Saviour", based on this.

Church in Wales titles
Preceded by Jeremy Hugh Winston	Dean of Newport; 2021–	Incumbent
