= St Woolos Cemetery =

Cemetery in Newport, Wales

Newport and St Woolos new Cemetery
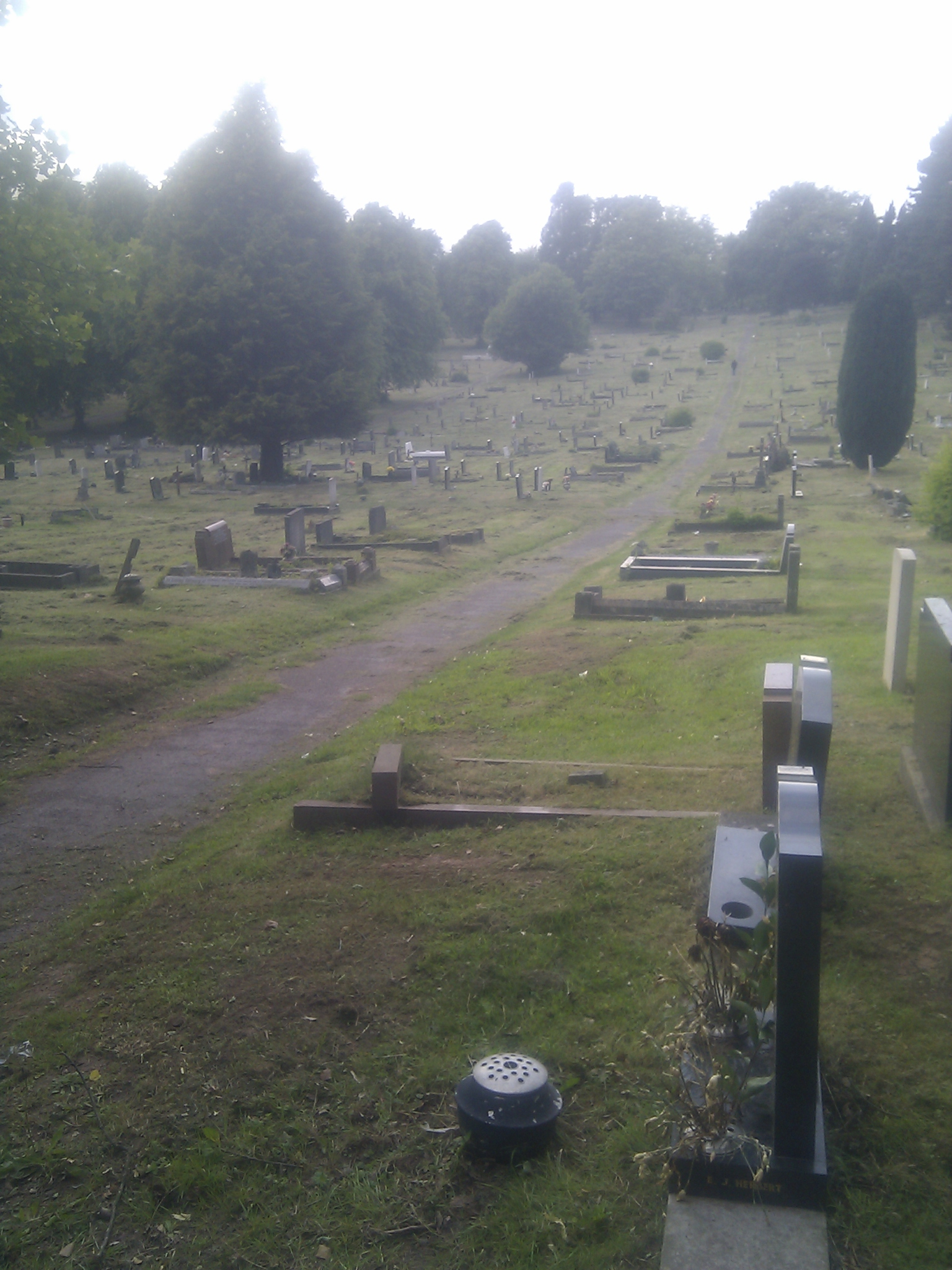
- Path within the older part of the cemetery
- Interactive map of Newport and St Woolos new Cemetery

Details
- Established: 1854
- Location: 48 Bassaleg Road, Newport, NP20 3PY
- Country: Wales
- Coordinates: 51°34′53″N 3°0′57″W
- Owned by: Newport City Council
- Size: 14 acres (5.7 ha)
- Website: Newport Cemeteries

St Woolos Cemetery, officially the Newport and St Woolos New Cemetery, is the principal cemetery in the city of Newport, Wales. It is situated one mile to the west of the Church in Wales cathedral of the same name. The cemetery contains four chapels and a variety of ornate memorials dating from the early Victorian period, and was the first municipally constructed cemetery in England and Wales. It remains in use to the present day as the principal burial ground for Newport, and has been used as a filming location for the BBC series Doctor Who. The cemetery is listed on the Cadw/ICOMOS Register of Parks and Gardens of Special Historic Interest in Wales.

== History ==
During the first half of the nineteenth century, the graveyard immediately outside St Woolos Cathedral had become full, yet burials continued to take place there in the shallow soil covering the existing graves. This posed a serious public health hazard, and "represented a ghoulish aspect with coffins protruding from the ground, many broken open with the grisly contents spilling out." In 1842, a new cemetery was opened near the cathedral on Clifton Road; however, this too quickly reached capacity, and fresh arrangements had to be made.

Land was acquired from the Tredegar Estate between Risca Road and Bassaleg Road, and a new cemetery was laid out, the first municipally constructed cemetery in Britain. The first interment was that of a sailor named Cooper, and took place on 1 July 1854.

The cathedral graveyard continued to receive new interments until its final closure in 1866, although in the latter years these had largely been additional burials within existing family plots. Other chapels in the town continued to use their own graveyards until 1869, by which time all had been closed. From that point forward, all burials in Newport took place in the new cemetery, until a second public cemetery was opened at Christchurch in 1883.

== Cemetery Listed Buildings and Structures ==
St Woolos Cemetery is included on the Cadw/ICOMOS Register of Parks and Gardens of Special Historic Interest in Wales. It contains a number of listed buildings, most of which date from the Victorian period. Of these, only one remains in use.

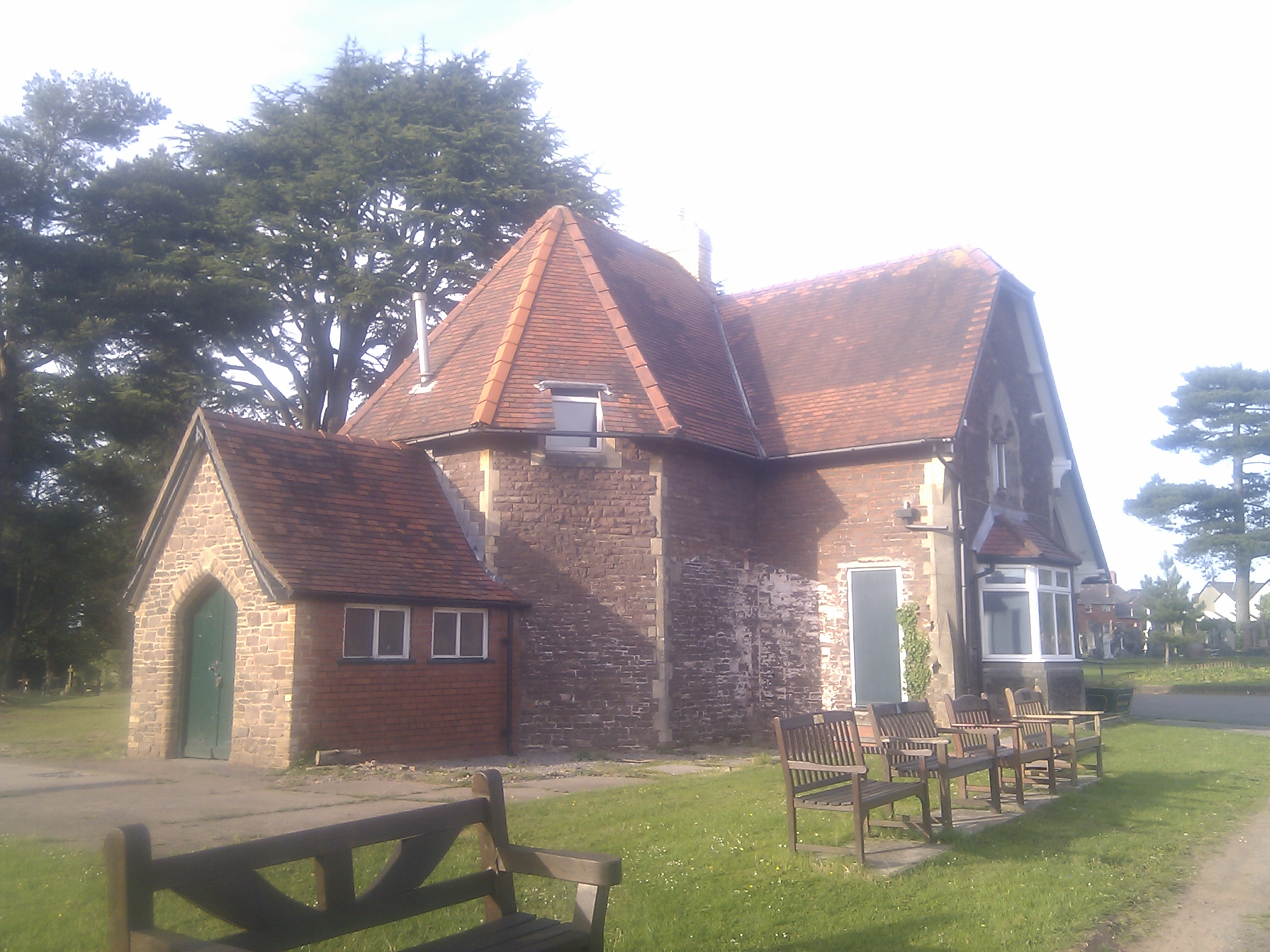
The original cemetery lodge is now used by Newport City Council as the Cemetery Office. 51°34′53″N 3°0′57″W

=== Lodge ===
Completed in 1855, the original lodge is built of "coursed rubble stonework and ashlar quoins and window surrounds". On the wall to the left of the entrance, a blue plaque has been erected to commemorate the artist James Flewitt Mullock, who also served as clerk to the Newport and St Woolos Burial Board. The building has been identified by the Royal Commission on the Ancient and Historical Monuments of Wales (RCAHMW) as being under threat, and was the subject of emergency recording in 2004. The lodge no longer serves as a dwelling, but is used as the cemetery office. It is situated at the main entrance to the cemetery on Bassaleg Road, in contrast to a more modern lodge on Risca Road, which remains in residential use but is not a listed building.

=== Anglican Chapel ===
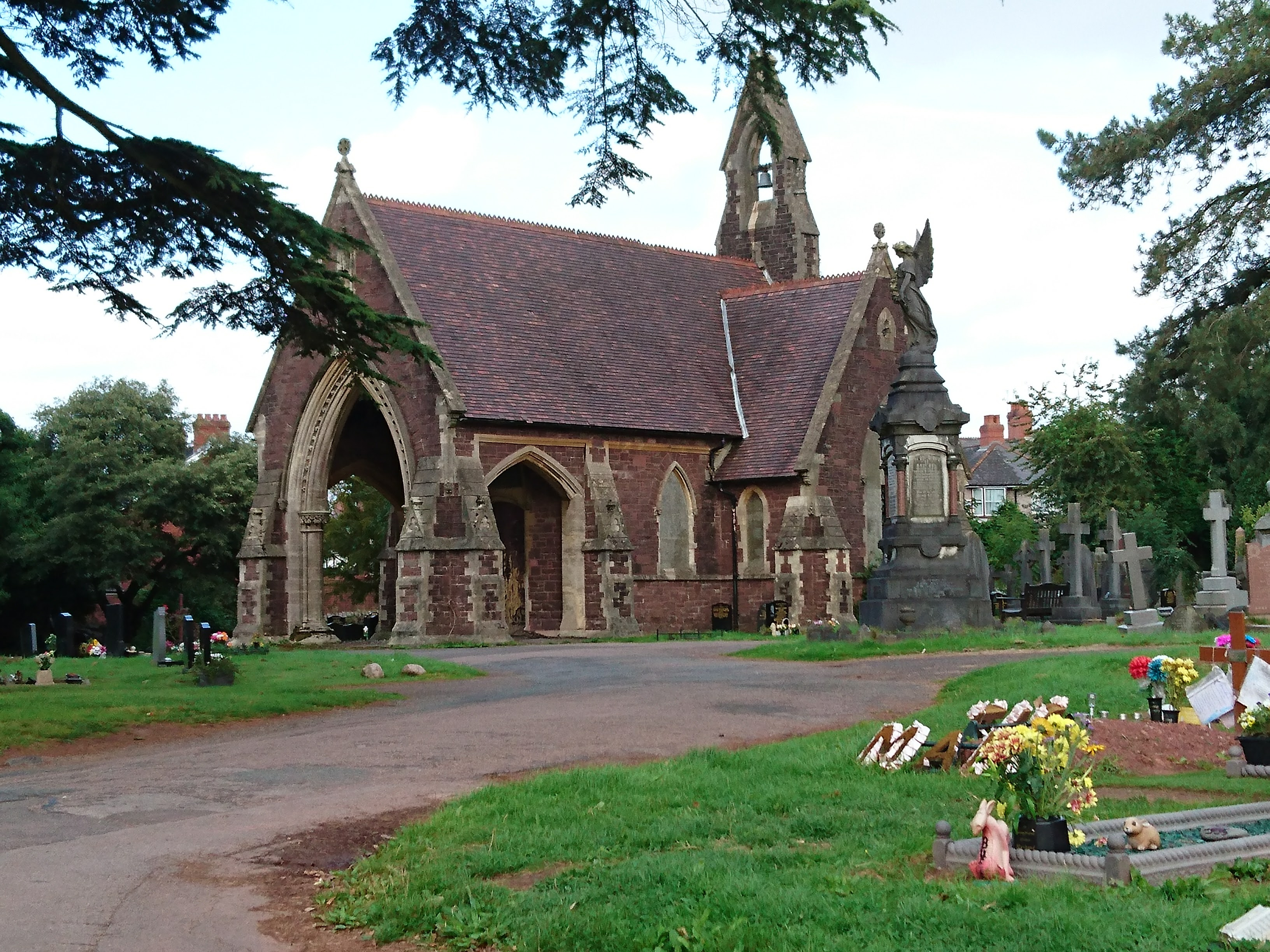
Exterior of Anglican Chapel in September 2017.

This is a Gothic-style building, entered through a columned porch in the western gable. It is one of a pair of symmetrical chapels that face each other across a circular plot near the main Bassaleg Road entrance to the cemetery. The Anglican chapel occupies the eastern side of the pair, with the nonconformist chapel to the west. The Anglican chapel features a neo-Gothic lancet arch. The shape of the archway is mirrored by the hood mould above the inner doorway, which is adorned with carved head stops. Set into the gable above the archway is an empty niche, intended to house a statue that was never installed. The building has neither a tower nor a spire, but does possess a bell-gable at the point where the roof line changes between the nave and the chancel. As of 25 May 2011, the single bell remained in place.

The chapel was in use until 1997, though by 2011 it appeared to be disused and strewn with debris.

=== Non-conformist Chapel ===
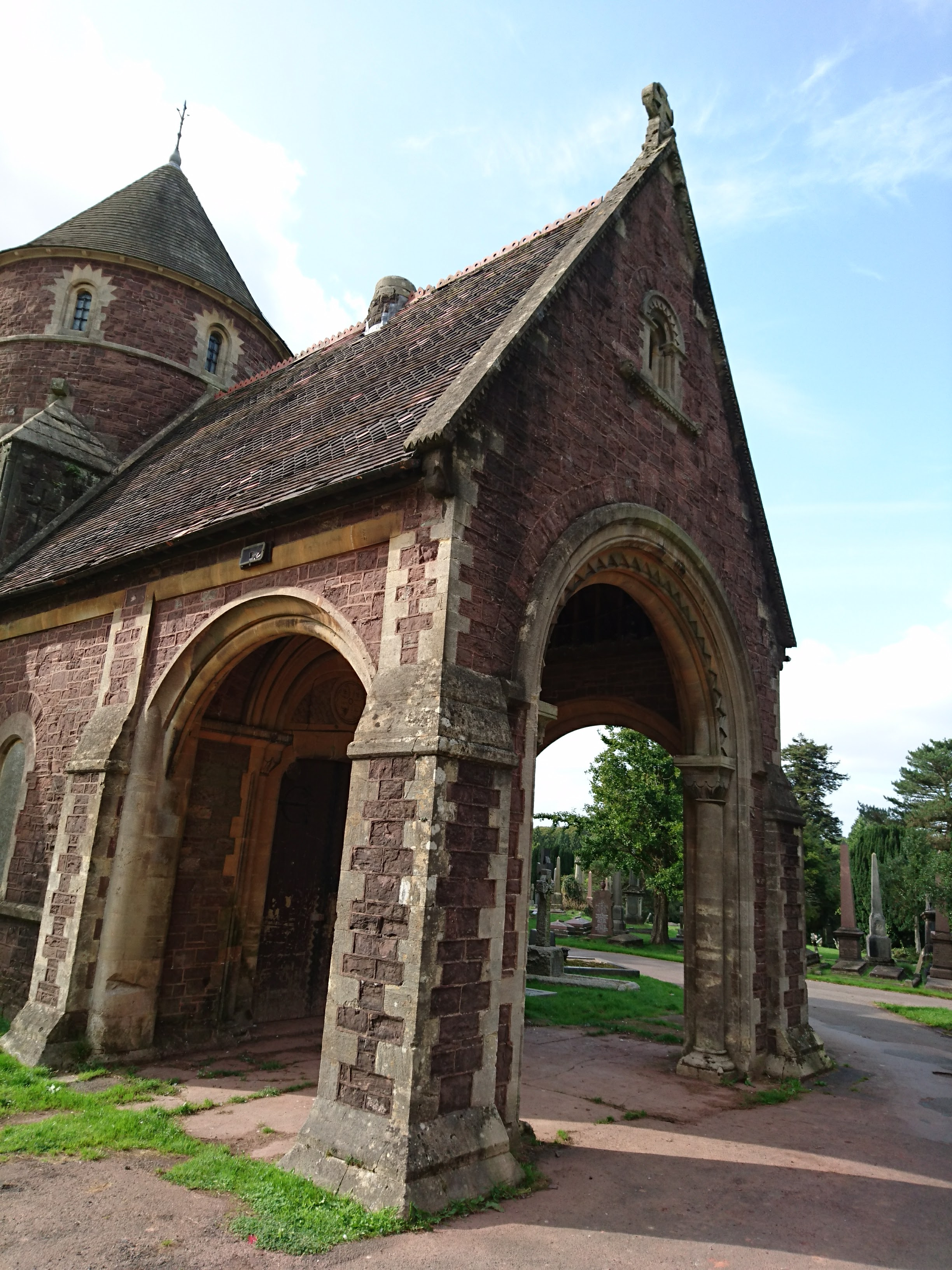
Entry porch to the nonconformist chapel

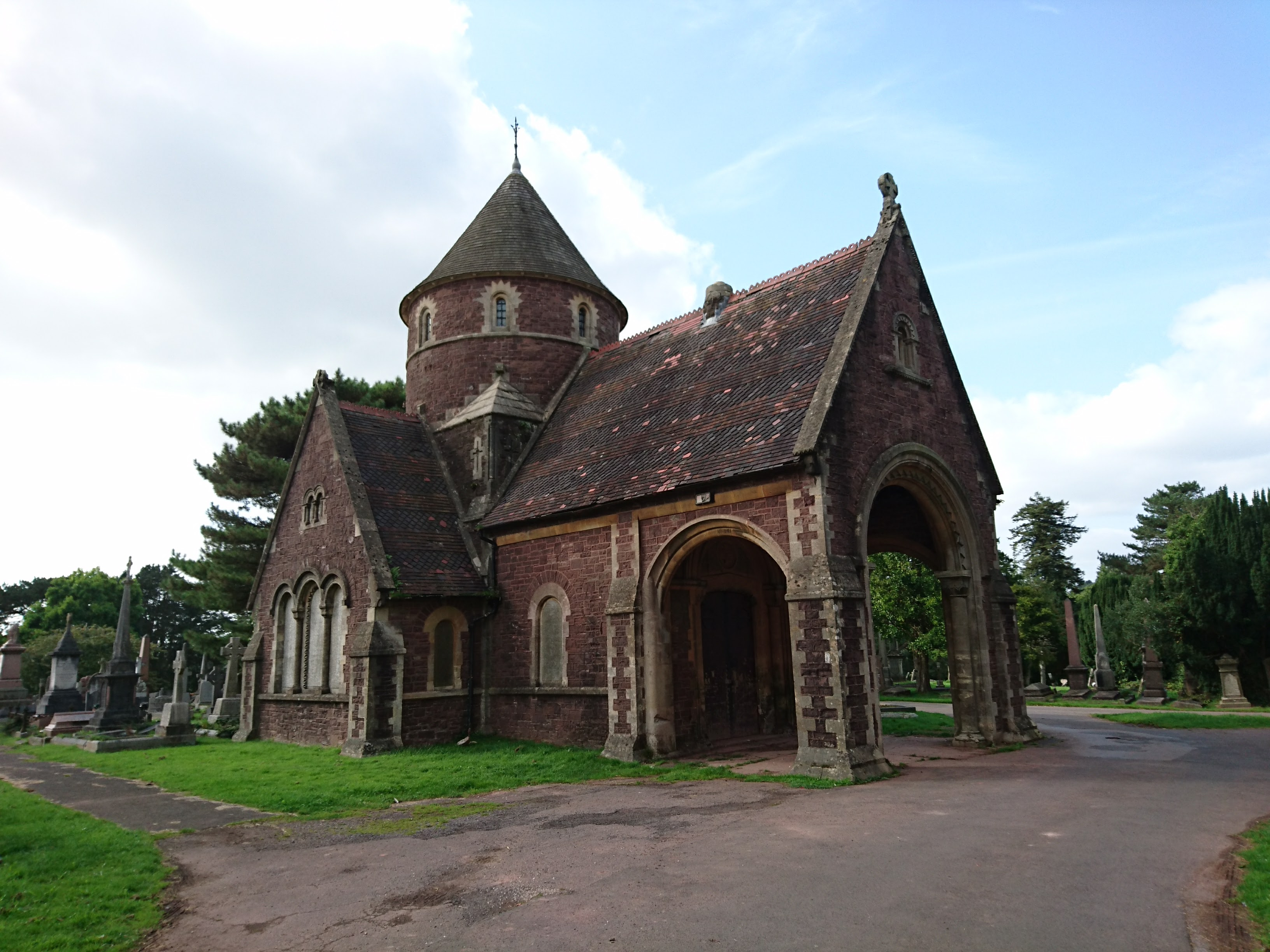
View of the nonconformist chapel from the north east

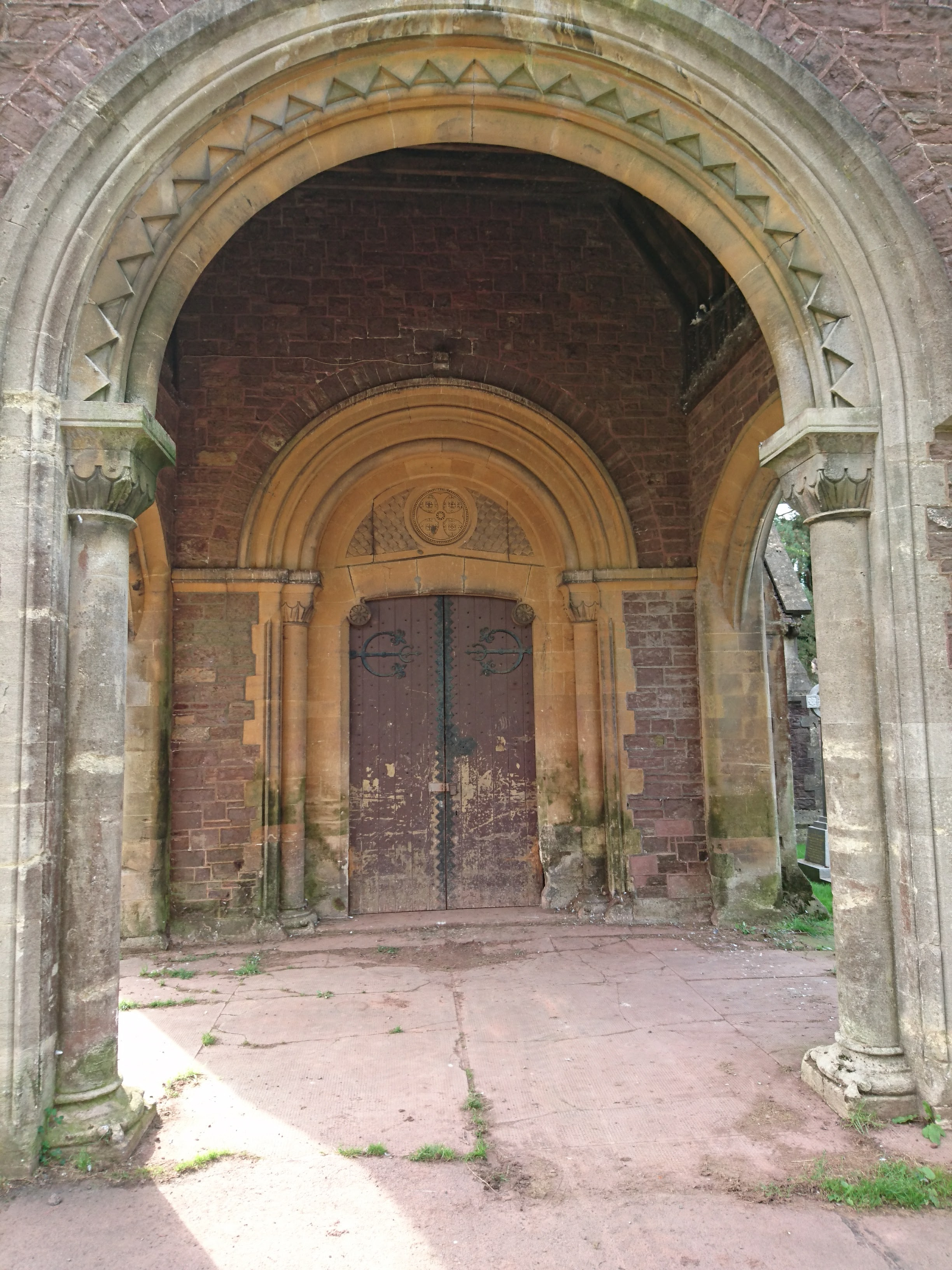
Doorway, showing the absence of wrought iron hinges and the dog-tooth pattern around the archway

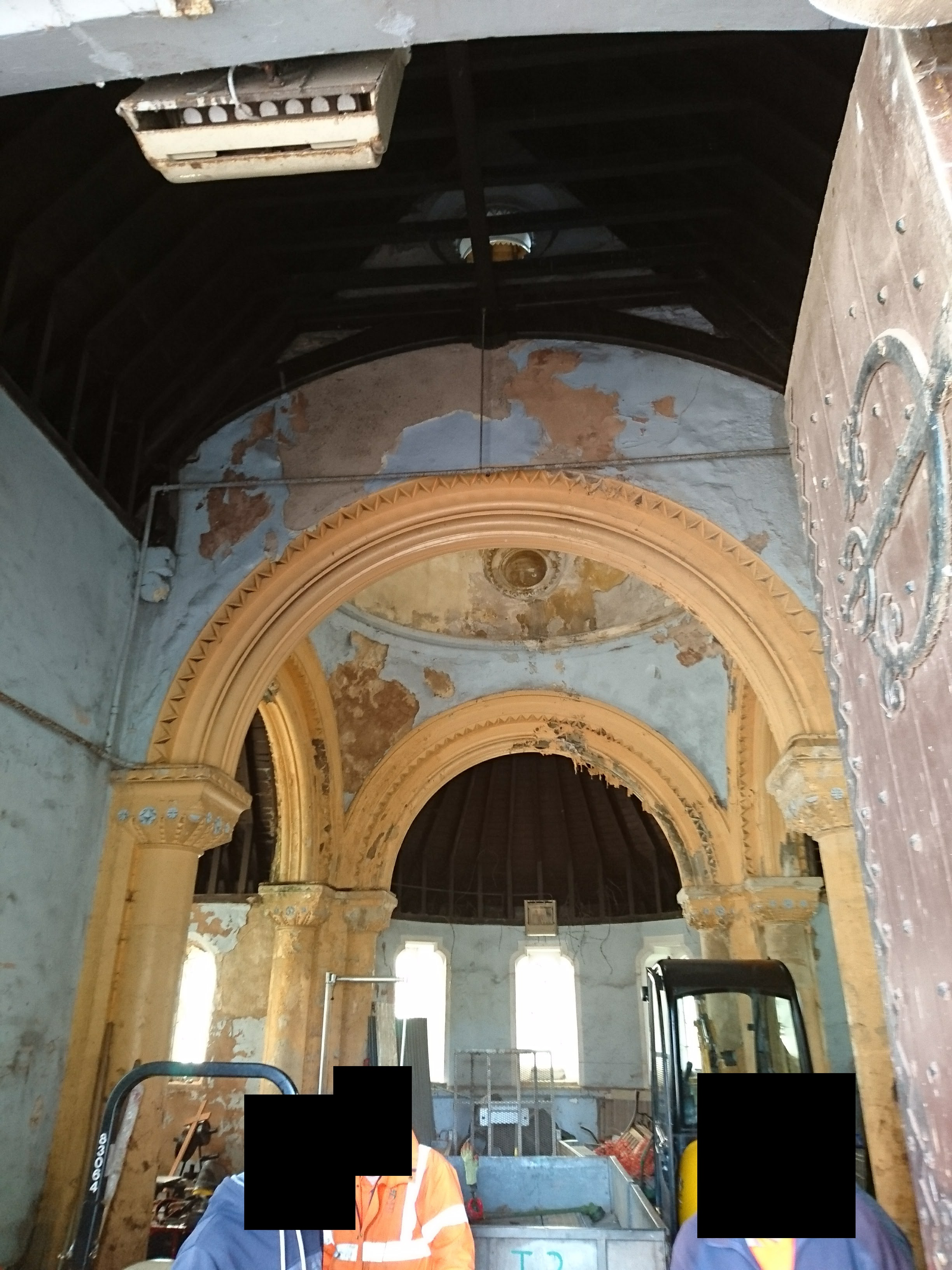
View into the chapel from the entrance, with the dog-tooth motif repeated in the internal arches

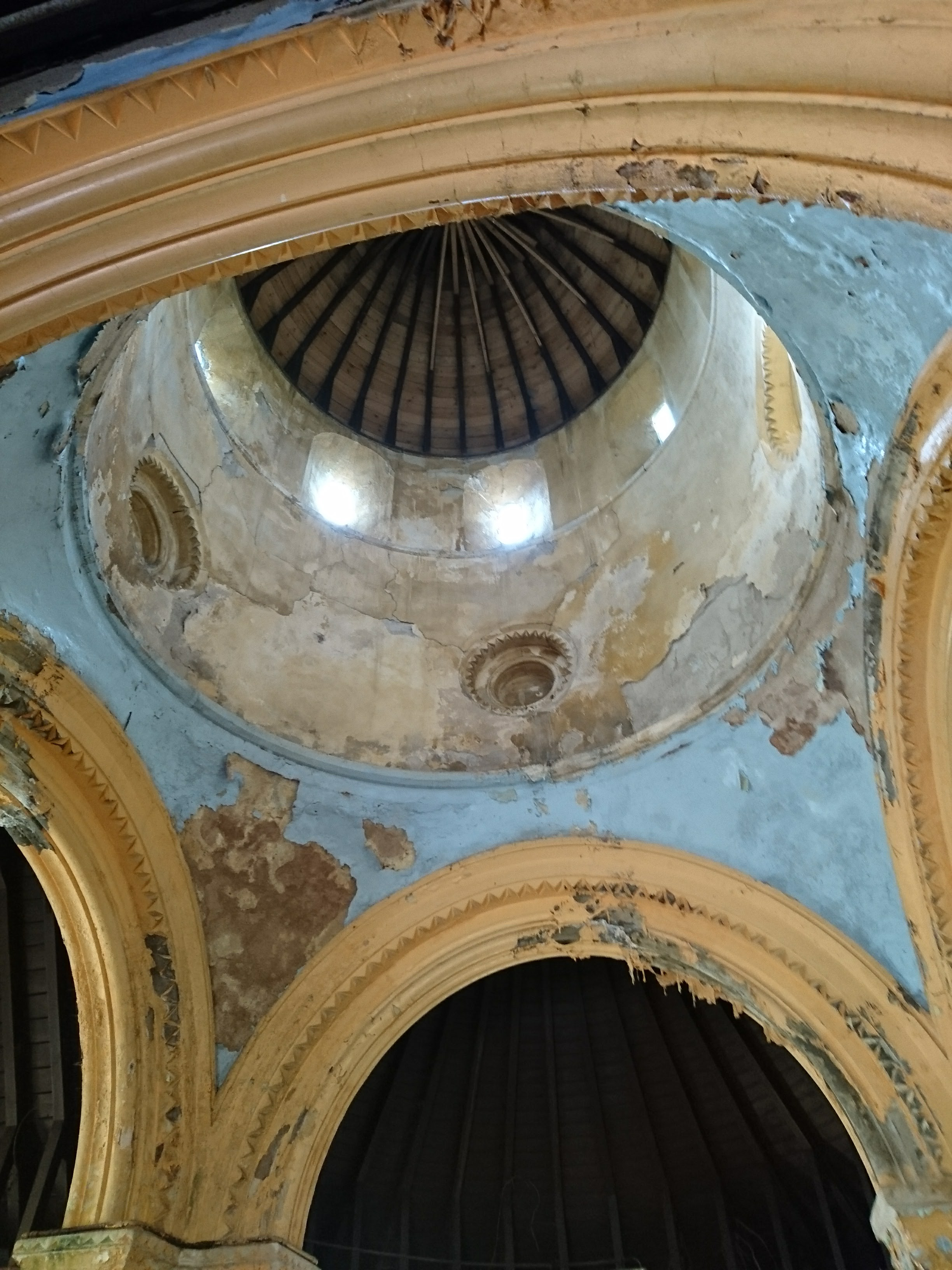
Inside the chapel, looking up into the cupola

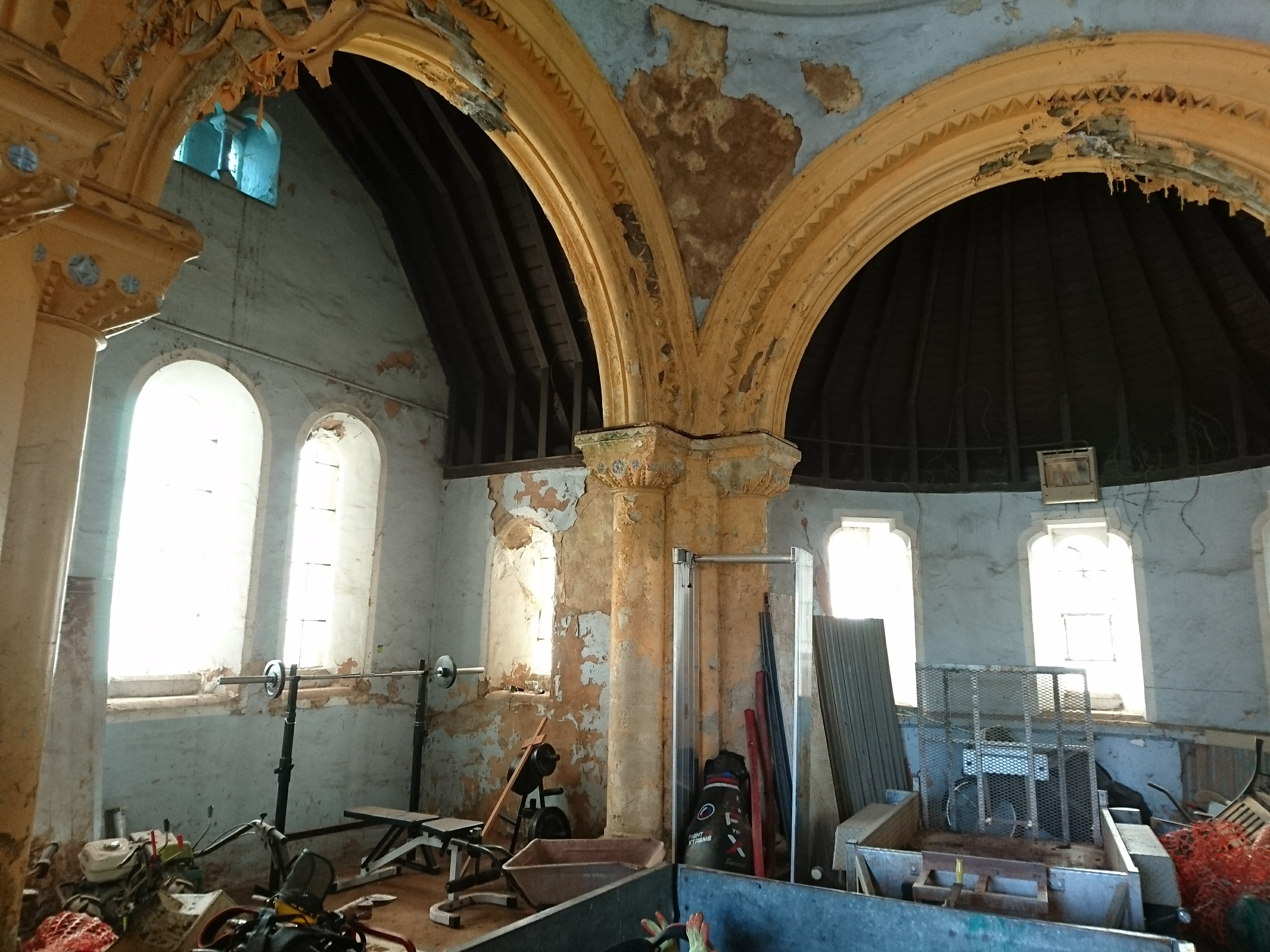
Inside the chapel, with the chancel to the right and the east transept to the left

This is a Romanesque-style building, and the western of the symmetrical pair of chapels at the main entrance on Bassaleg Road. Although the two chapels are symmetrical in their positioning and dimensions, there are marked stylistic differences between them. The nonconformist chapel features a distinctive circular tower with a conical slate roof over the chancel, in contrast to the plain bell-gable of the Anglican chapel. Its porch is entered through a Norman-style rounded arch with dog-tooth decoration, rather than the Gothic arch of its counterpart. Where the Anglican chapel has an empty niche in the gable above the arch, the nonconformist chapel has a small, single-light, Norman-arched window opening into the roof space above the porch. The chapel also displays a decorative roof pattern executed in tiles of differing shapes and materials.

As with the Anglican chapel, RCAHMW recorded the building still in use as a chapel in 1997, though by 2011 it appeared to be disused and in a condition comparable to that of the Anglican chapel.

=== Roman Catholic Chapel ===
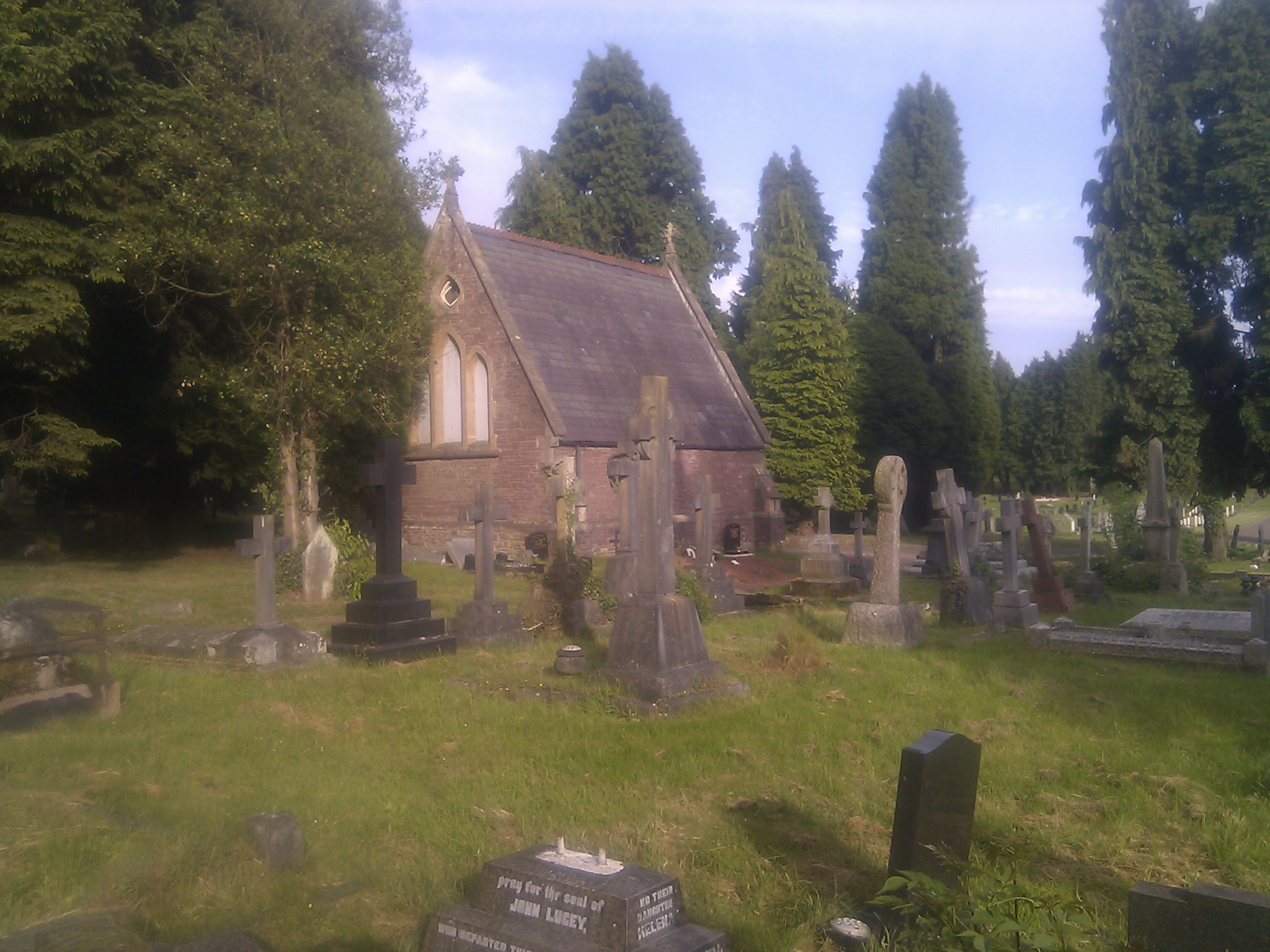
View of the disused Catholic chapel

51°35′1″N 3°1′7″W

This building stands alone within the cemetery grounds, due south of the Risca Road and Fields Park Road roundabout. The windows of the chapel have since been bricked up. RCAHMW recorded the building as "disused" in 1997.

=== Synagogue and Jew's Burial Ground ===
51°35′4″N 3°1′3″W The synagogue and Jewish cemetery lie outside and to the north of the main cemetery, within Coed-Melyn Park. The synagogue is entered from Risca Road, to the east of the Fields Park Road roundabout. This small octagonal building is a modern extension to an earlier Jewish Chapel of Rest, which opened in 1871. The building's small stained-glass windows display a Star of David motif. The burial ground is situated behind the synagogue and contains large gravestones bearing Hebrew inscriptions. Among these are Commonwealth war graves of an airman and three soldiers of the Pioneer Corps who served during World War II.

A 2007 photographic survey of the building showed an interior that was well maintained. In 2013, however, the Sifrei Torah belonging to the congregation was transferred to an Israeli Jewish community, in a ceremony held within the building, to ensure its continued use. By June 2017, the synagogue had fallen into disuse, and the local community was invited to propose an alternative use for it. A more recent Jewish burial ground, complete with a small red-brick chapel of rest, lies within the cemetery itself. This burial ground is also locked, and is enclosed by a tall fence. Unlike the older synagogue and burial ground, this structure is not listed.

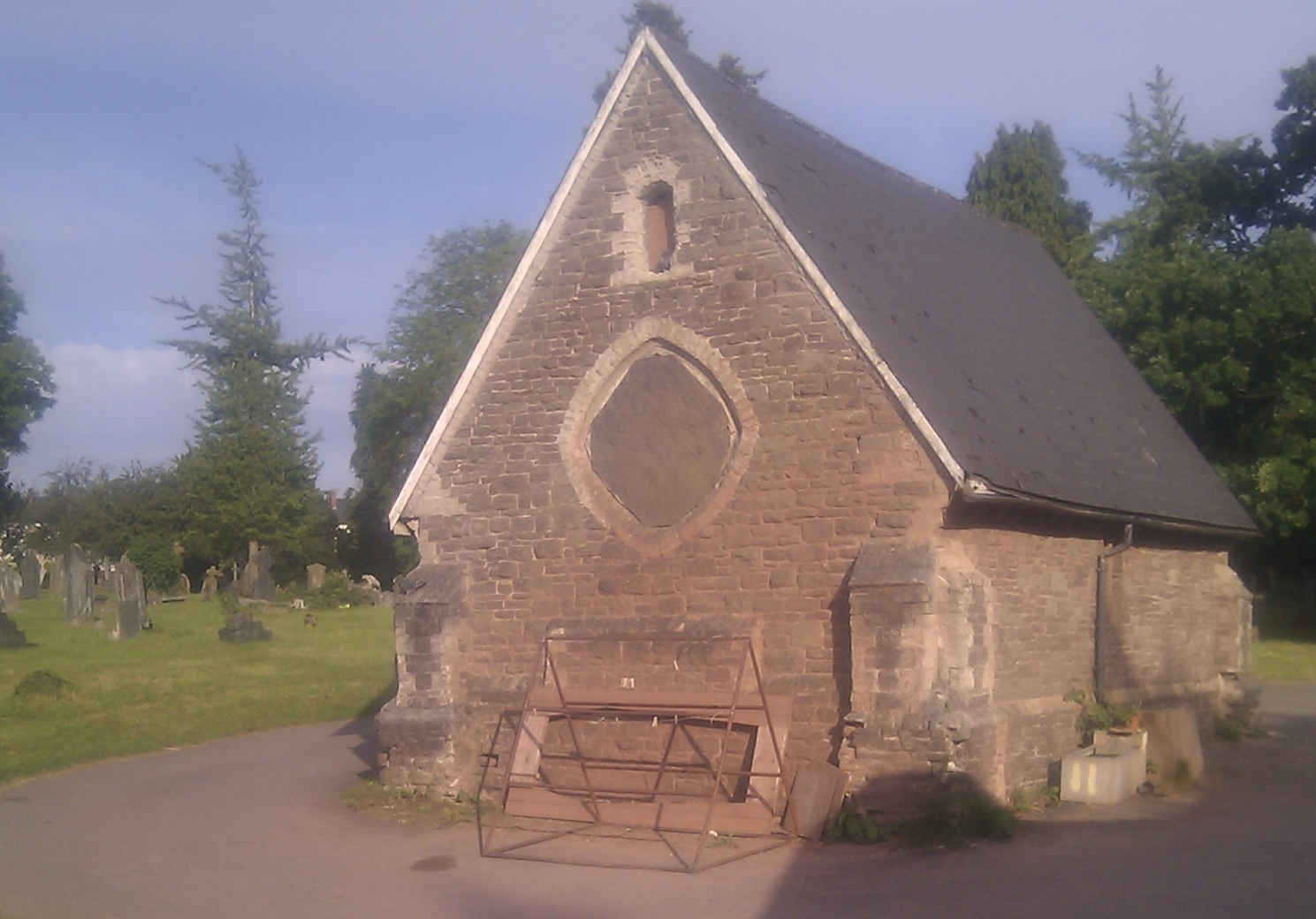
View of the disused mortuary chapel

51°34′59″N 3°1′1″W

=== Mortuary Chapel ===
The Mortuary Chapel, which stands near the mortuary on the thoroughfare linking the Bassaleg Road and Risca Road entrances, is also grade II listed. Unlike the other chapels in the cemetery, this one was entered through a door in the side of the nave, rather than through the gable end. The building has rose windows on each gable end, which would once have provided light into the chapel, but are now boarded up. The chapel is no longer used for its original purpose, and the fabric of the building shows significant signs of decay.

=== Eastern entrance ===
51°34′53″N 3°0′56″W The gates, piers and flanking walls at the main entrance to the cemetery from Bassaleg Road are also listed. This entrance provides vehicular access to the cemetery.

=== Friends of St Woolos Cemetery ===
In 2019, a trust was formed to support the cemetery, a much-loved and well-visited site in the heart of the city that contains a wealth of art, architecture, history, flora and fauna.

== Notable interments ==
- Annie Brewer (1874–1921), nurse during the First World War, recipient of the Légion d'Honneur and the Croix de Guerre
- John Byrne VC (1832–1879), recipient of the Victoria Cross during the Crimean War
- Arthur Gould (1864–1919), international rugby player, regarded as Welsh rugby's first superstar
- Jon Lee (1968–2002), drummer with the rock band Feeder
- Miles Moseley (1888–1915), recipient of the Albert Medal for his actions during the Abercarn colliery disaster

== Notable memorials ==
In addition to the buildings within the cemetery, there are a number of notable memorials on the site.

=== Newport Docks Disaster Memorial ===
The cemetery contains a coarse-finished granite obelisk erected in memory of the victims of the Newport Docks disaster. On 2 July 1909, 39 men were killed when the retaining wall of the excavation that was to become an extension to the Alexandra Dock collapsed, trapping them in mud, water and debris.

=== War memorial ===
At the midpoint between the symmetrical chapels at the main entrance stands a Cross of Sacrifice, a war memorial erected by the Commonwealth War Graves Commission to commemorate local men who fell in the First World War. It commemorates 197 soldiers and sailors interred in this cemetery and in Christchurch Cemetery, also in Newport. It is located at 51°34′55″N 3°0′57″W.

=== Commonwealth war graves ===
St Woolos Cemetery contains the war graves of 167 Commonwealth service personnel of the First World War and 98 of the Second World War. In addition, the Commonwealth War Graves Commission is responsible for the graves of ten foreign national service personnel.

=== World War I Graves ===
In 2018, Newport commemorated the centenary of those who gave their lives in the First World War. The names of over 1,500 are currently known, though the list continues to grow as further names are discovered. In 1921, Newport Council dispatched teachers to every residence in the town to record the names of those who had served and died in the war. This meticulous record was published as a booklet entitled "The Newport Roll of Honour", and the original documents are now held at Gwent Archives. Researchers, however, continue to discover omissions from this list and to uncover the stories of those who perished but were not included. Not all of those buried and identified by the CWGC (above) have an official headstone, and some, like Annie Brewer, have not yet been recognised by that body. Others, such as Florence Johnstone, who are buried in the cemetery, do not qualify for official war dead status, despite having been killed on war duties at an armaments factory. The Gwent branch of the Western Front Association carried out a survey of Newport's war dead in advance of the 2018 commemoration and continues to identify missing names.

== In popular culture ==
The cemetery was used as a filming location for the 2007 Doctor Who episode "Blink" and the 2008 Christmas special, in which the Cybermen attack mourners. Both episodes starred David Tennant. The cemetery also appears as a location in the crime thriller novel We Go Down Slowly Rising by the Newport author John Gimblett.

Joe Strummer, of the Clash, worked as a gravedigger in the cemetery until his return to London in 1973.
