= John Byrne (VC) =

Recipient of the Victoria Cross (1832–1879)

John Byrne VC DCM
- Born: September 1832; Castlecomer, County Kilkenny, Ireland
- Died: 10 July 1879 (aged 46); Caerleon, Monmouthshire, Wales
- Burial place: St Woolos Cemetery, Wales
- Military career
- Allegiance: United Kingdom
- Branch: British Army
- Service years: 1850–1872
- Rank: Sergeant
- Units: 68th Regiment of Foot
- Conflicts: Crimean War; New Zealand Wars
- Awards: Victoria Cross; Distinguished Conduct Medal

John Byrne, VC, DCM (September 1832 – 10 July 1879) was a British Army soldier and an Irish recipient of the Victoria Cross, the highest award for gallantry in the face of the enemy that can be awarded to British and Commonwealth forces.

== Life ==
Byrne was born at Castlecomer, County Kilkenny in Ireland, in September 1832.

Byrne was about 22 years old, and a private in the 68th Regiment of Foot (later The Durham Light Infantry), British Army during the Crimean War. He was awarded the Victoria Cross for his actions at the Battle of Inkerman on 5 November 1854 on the Crimean Peninsula. When his regiment was ordered to retire, Private Byrne went back towards the enemy, and, at the risk of his own life, brought in a wounded soldier, under fire. On 11 May 1855 he bravely engaged in a hand-to-hand contest with one of the enemy on the parapet of the work he was defending, prevented the entrance of the enemy, killed his antagonist, and captured his arms.

He later achieved the rank of sergeant. He died, aged 46, in Newport, Wales.

== The medal ==
The only medal on display is his New Zealand campaign medal, held in the Durham Light Infantry Museum.

A Victoria Cross medal (missing the suspender bar and ribbon) was found by Tobias Neto in the mud of the River Thames on 17 December 2015, the medal having the date of "November 5, 1854" engraved on the reverse. Of the 16 VCs awarded for actions during the Battle of Inkerman, two were unaccounted for—those won by John Byrne and John McDermond of the 47th (Lancashire) Regiment of Foot, the other 14 being in private collections or museums. However, in an article published on the UK Detector Net web forum, the finder is seen to claim that the medal was established as that awarded to John Byrne, but on the basis of its dated reverse and not the critical suspension bar which bears the awardee's name, rank, serial number and regiment. It remains possible the recipient could have been McDermond or Byrne.

== Sources ==
- John Byrne at Find-A-Grave
- Biography, lightinfantry.me.uk
