= Newport Cathedral =

Coordinates: 51°34′59″N 2°59′55″W

- Cathedral Church of St Woolos, King & Confessor
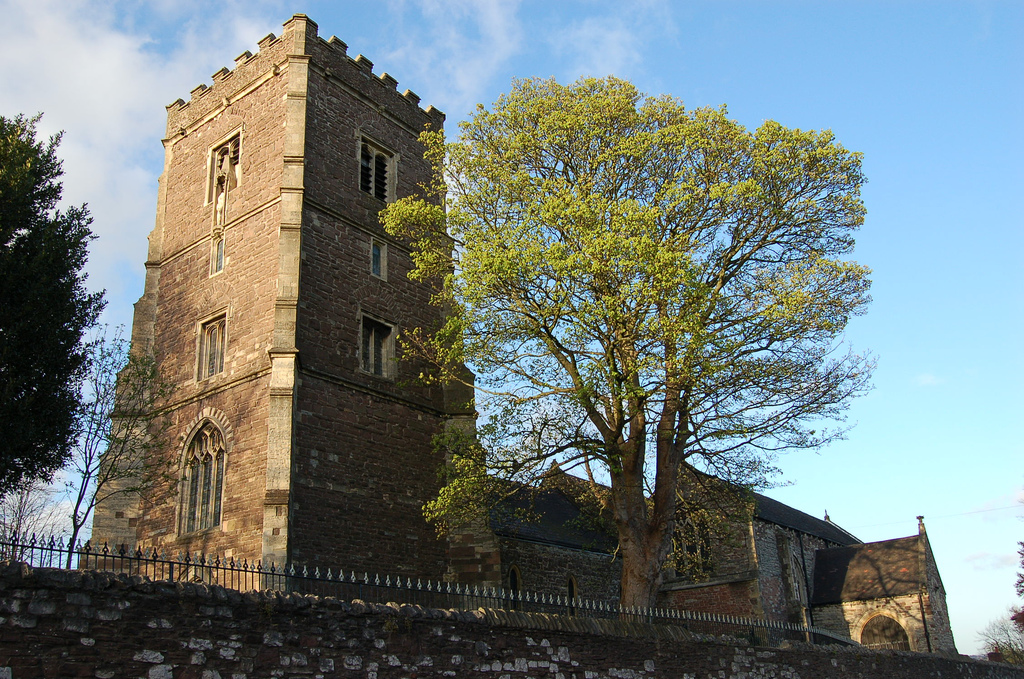
- St Woolos Cathedral south face
- Newport Cathedral
- Location: Newport
- Country: Wales
- Denomination: Church in Wales
- Previous denomination: Roman Catholic
- Website: Newport Cathedral website

History
- Status: Cathedral (1949)
- Founded: 5th century
- Founder: Gwynllyw
- Dedication: Gwynllyw
- Events: Extended 12th, 15th and 20th centuries

Architecture
- Heritage designation: Class I listed

Administration
- Diocese: Diocese of Monmouth
- Archdeaconry: not applicable
- Parish: Newport Cathedral

Clergy
- Bishop: Cherry Vann
- Dean: Ian Black

Newport Cathedral (Welsh: Eglwys Gaderiol Casnewydd/Cadeirlan Casnewydd), also known as St Gwynllyw's or St Woolos' Cathedral, is the cathedral of the Diocese of Monmouth within the Church in Wales, and the seat of the Bishop of Monmouth. (Note: There is potential for confusion over the name of the cathedral. Known locally as 'St Woolos', corrupted from the Welsh name 'Gwynllyw', the Latin version 'Gundleus' was often used in official documents. Historians sometimes favour the original 'Gwynllyw', up to the present day. More recently, attempts for it to be known as Newport Cathedral have only been partially successful. There is also a mismatch between the name of the diocese as 'Monmouth' and the cathedral located in Newport.) Its official title is Newport Cathedral Church of St Woolos, King and Confessor. The English name, Woolos, is an anglicisation of the Welsh name Gwynllyw.

It became a cathedral in 1949 and while it is the size of a large parish church rather than a typical cathedral, its history and development from the sixth to the twentieth century make it arguably one of the most interesting religious buildings in Wales.

== St Gwynllyw ==
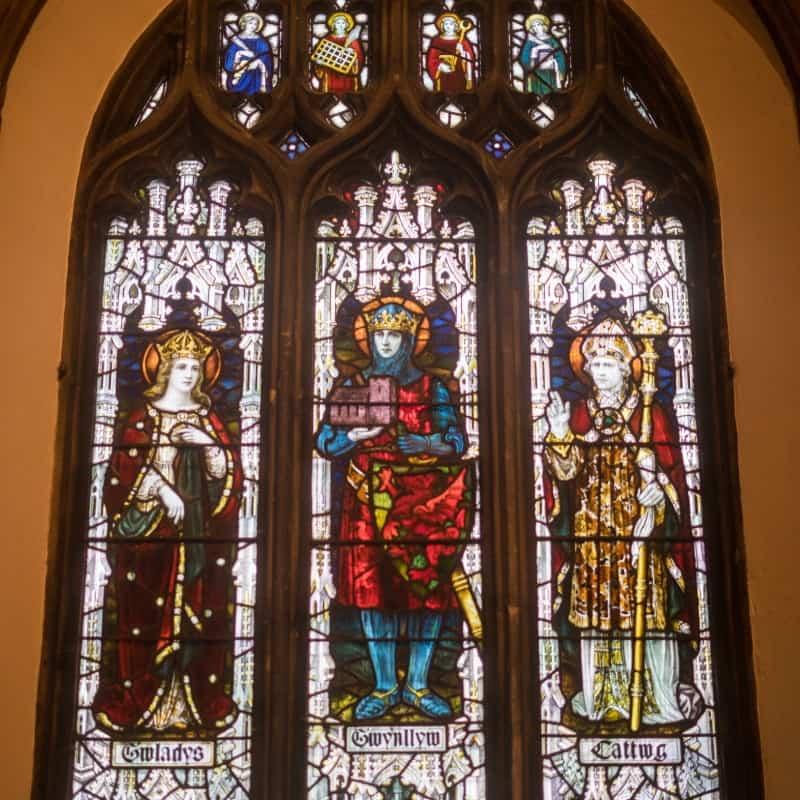
St Gwynllyw with St Gwladys and St Cattwg fancifully depicted in a 19th-century window in the south aisle

The church was founded by St Gwynllyw, who lived in the later fifth century, after the Roman occupation, at a time when Wales was beginning to develop a national identity. Gwynllyw was the king of Gwynllwg, an area which lay between later Glamorgan and Gwent. There seems little doubt of his historical existence as a real person, although miraculous events are associated with his life and burial place. He was alleged to have been originally a merciless warrior against adjoining kingdoms, a robber and a pirate. Later in life, he converted to Christianity, having been told in a dream to follow a white ox to the prominent hill where he built a church, probably of wood. The shape and footprint of this original church is reflected over 1500 years later in St Mary's chapel at the west end of the cathedral. The church became his burial place (Welsh: eglwys y bedd), and in succeeding centuries was a significant place of pilgrimage. It was subject to plundering and attack including, it is said, by Irish pirates and Danes, and in 1060 by followers of Harold Godwinson, the last Anglo-Saxon king.

Gwynllyw is venerated in Wales and in the Roman Catholic and Eastern Orthodox traditions. He was the husband of St Gwladys and their son was one of the greatest of all Welsh saints and scholars, Cadoc (Cattwg in Welsh).

== Medieval period ==
After their conquest of South Wales, the Anglo-Normans built the first castle in Newport in the late eleventh century or early twelfth century, close to Gwynllyw's church, which would itself have been rebuilt by then, probably in stone.

A much greater transformation took place at the site in the later twelfth century when a large new church was built in the Romanesque style with round-headed arches, favoured by the Normans. Instead of building this new church directly on the original site of Gwynllyw's church, it was built to the east, but attached to it, respecting the sanctity of the original site and indicating of the strength of the cult of Gwynllyw.

In the 14th century, the castle was replaced by a new castle on the bank of the River Usk. The town of Newport (Casnewydd in Welsh, meaning 'new castle') grew near the castle and river. St Gwynllyw's church remained prominent on its hill-top in a rural location, well outside the town boundaries and its defensive gates. It retained its status as the parish church of Newport due to its prestige. In the late nineteenth century the church become surrounded by the western suburbs of Newport.

== A tour of the cathedral ==
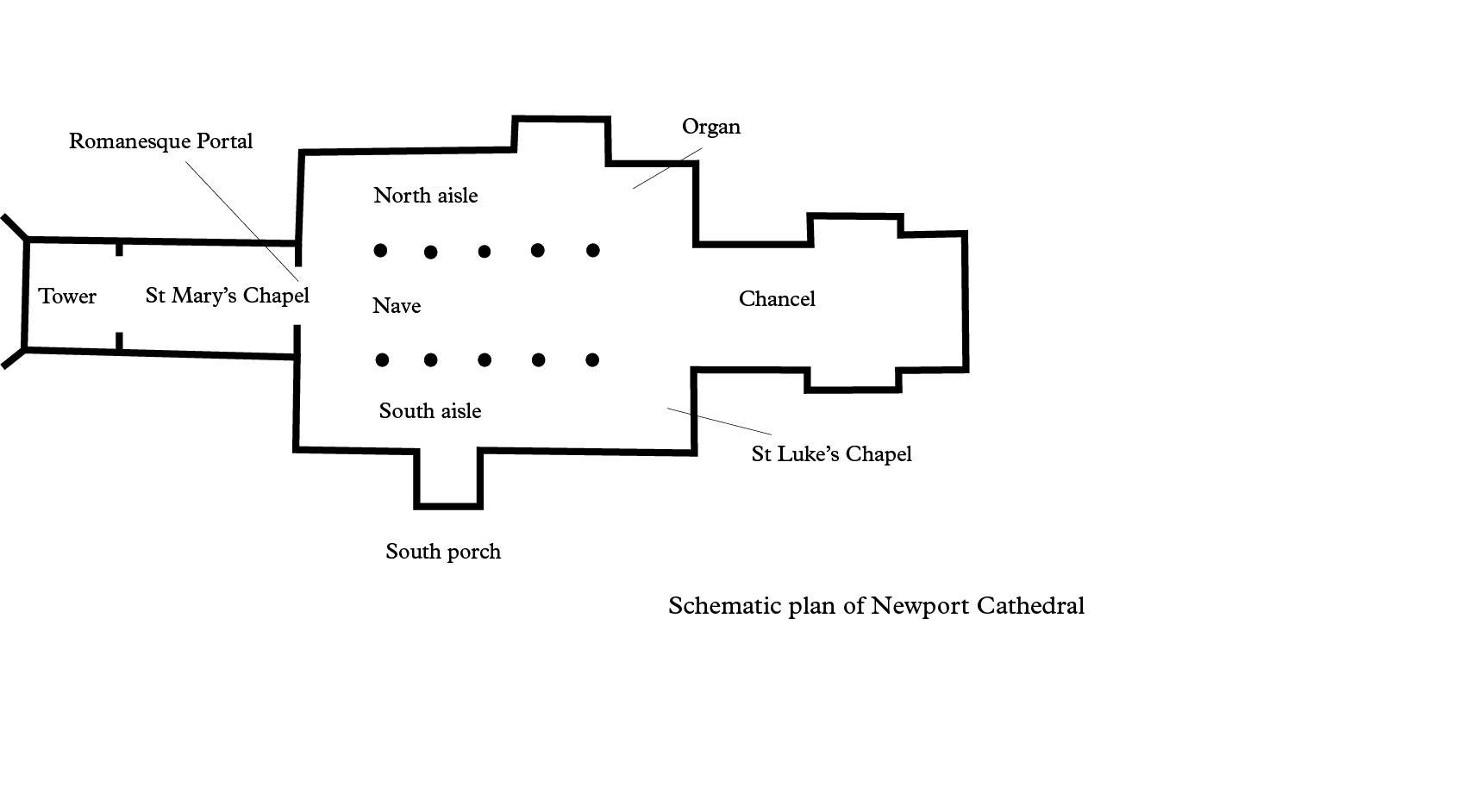
A schematic plan of the cathedral

The cathedral is usually approached from the west door, so the visitor moves from the west towards the east end, passing through the tower, then St Mary's chapel and through the Romanesque portal to the larger church beyond and finally to the twentieth-century eastern extensions.

== Tower ==
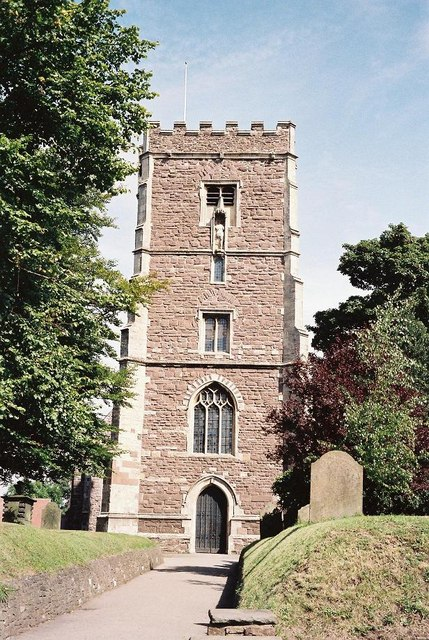
Newport Cathedral from the west

The tower dates from the fifteenth century and is built in the later medieval Perpendicular style with wider and flatter arches than earlier Gothic styles. The headless statue on the outside of the third story of the tower is traditionally associated with Jasper Tudor who may have funded its construction. He had strong Welsh connections and was the uncle of Henry VII, the first king of the Tudor dynasty. Tradition also asserts that his head on the statue was shot down during the English Civil War by Cromwell’s supporters.

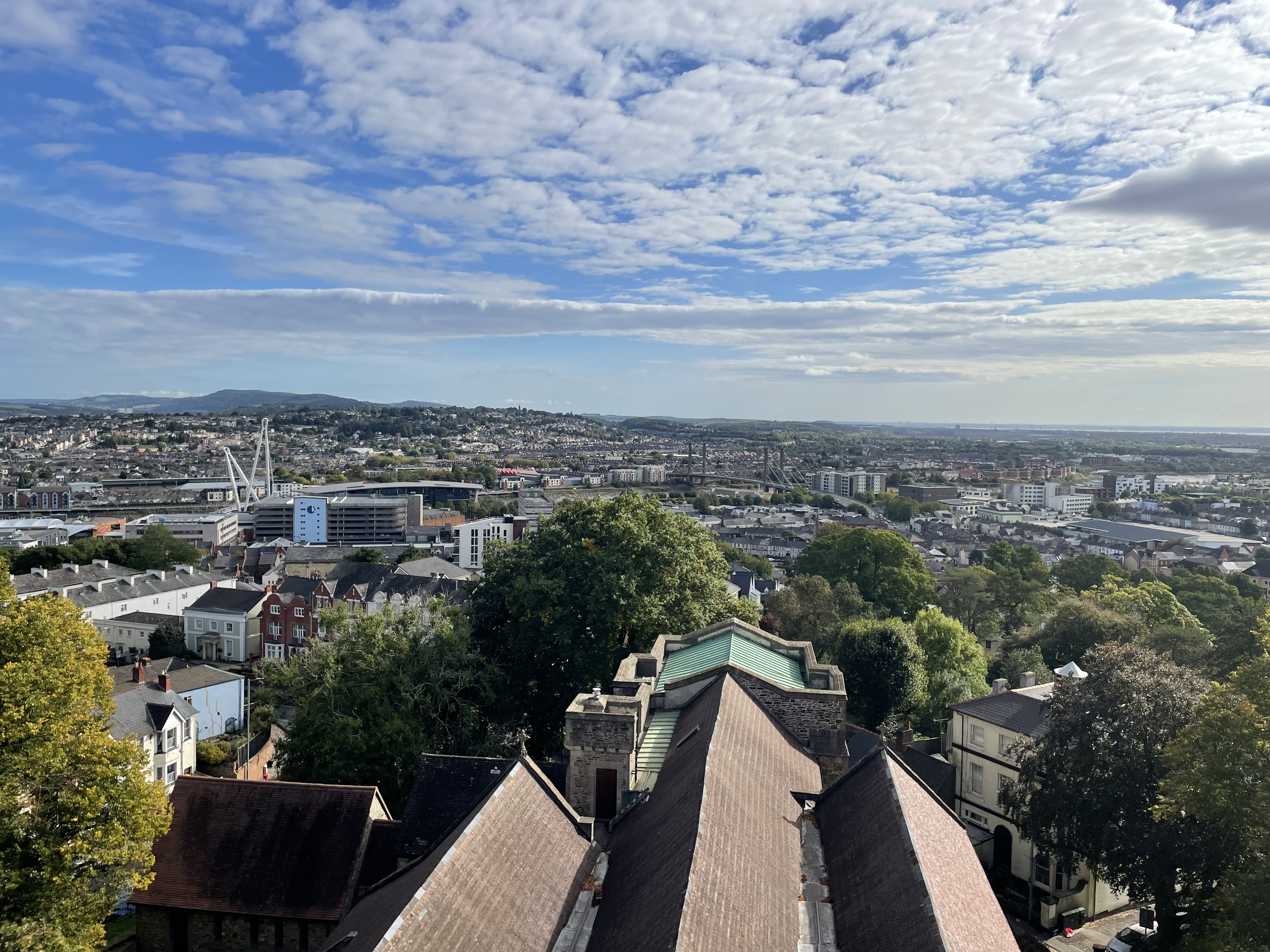
The view from the roof of the tower of St Woolos Cathedral

The tower contains a ring of 13 bells, the largest ring of bells in Wales. Although a fine tower, it is separated from the main body of the church by St Mary's chapel. It is not certain whether there was an earlier tower on the site.

== St Mary's Chapel ==
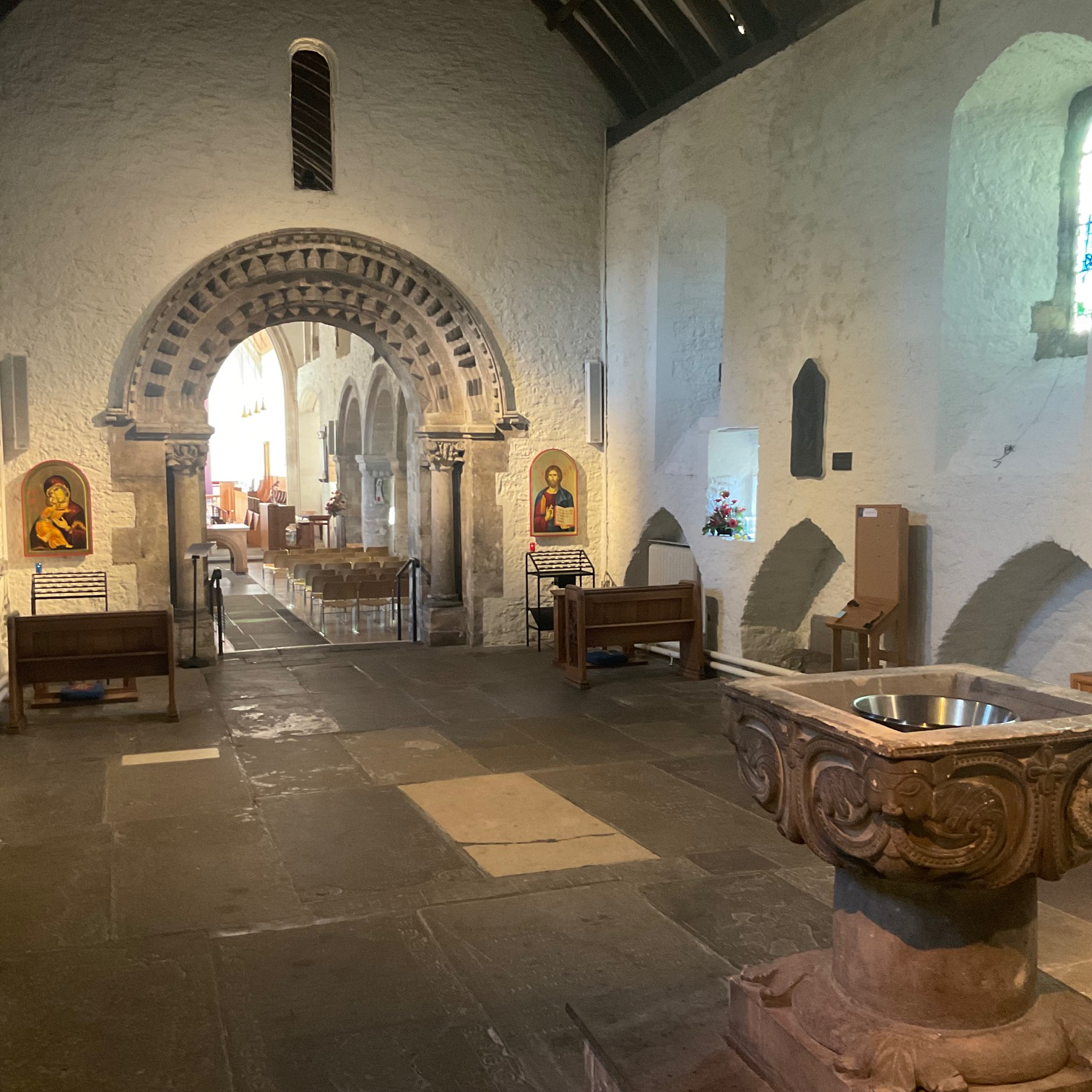
St Mary's Chapel looking towards the east with the font in the foreground

To enter St Mary's chapel, which now links the tower with the main body of the cathedral, we pass through a modern glass screen engraved with representations of St Gwynllyw holding his church and of St David (Welsh: Dewi Sant), the patron saint of Wales, with a dove on his shoulder.

St Mary's was the original site of Gwynllyw’s church, (though much restored and rebuilt in the 11th, 13th and 19th centuries) and the site of his tomb, (Welsh: bedd y sant), which is believed to have been on the south side of the building. This chapel is a place to savour the established tradition of Celtic Christianity in Wales, which long predates the arrival of St Augustine to convert England.

Towards the west end of the chapel is a splendid Victorian reconstruction of a Romanesque font based on a surviving fragment of the original which has been incorporated in the later work. The shaft and base of the font look medieval.

Low down on the south side of the chapel, a curious medieval octagonal window has been cut into the fabric which is believed to have been relocated here in 1913 when the south porch (now the cathedral shop) of the main building was remodelled.

== The Romanesque portal ==
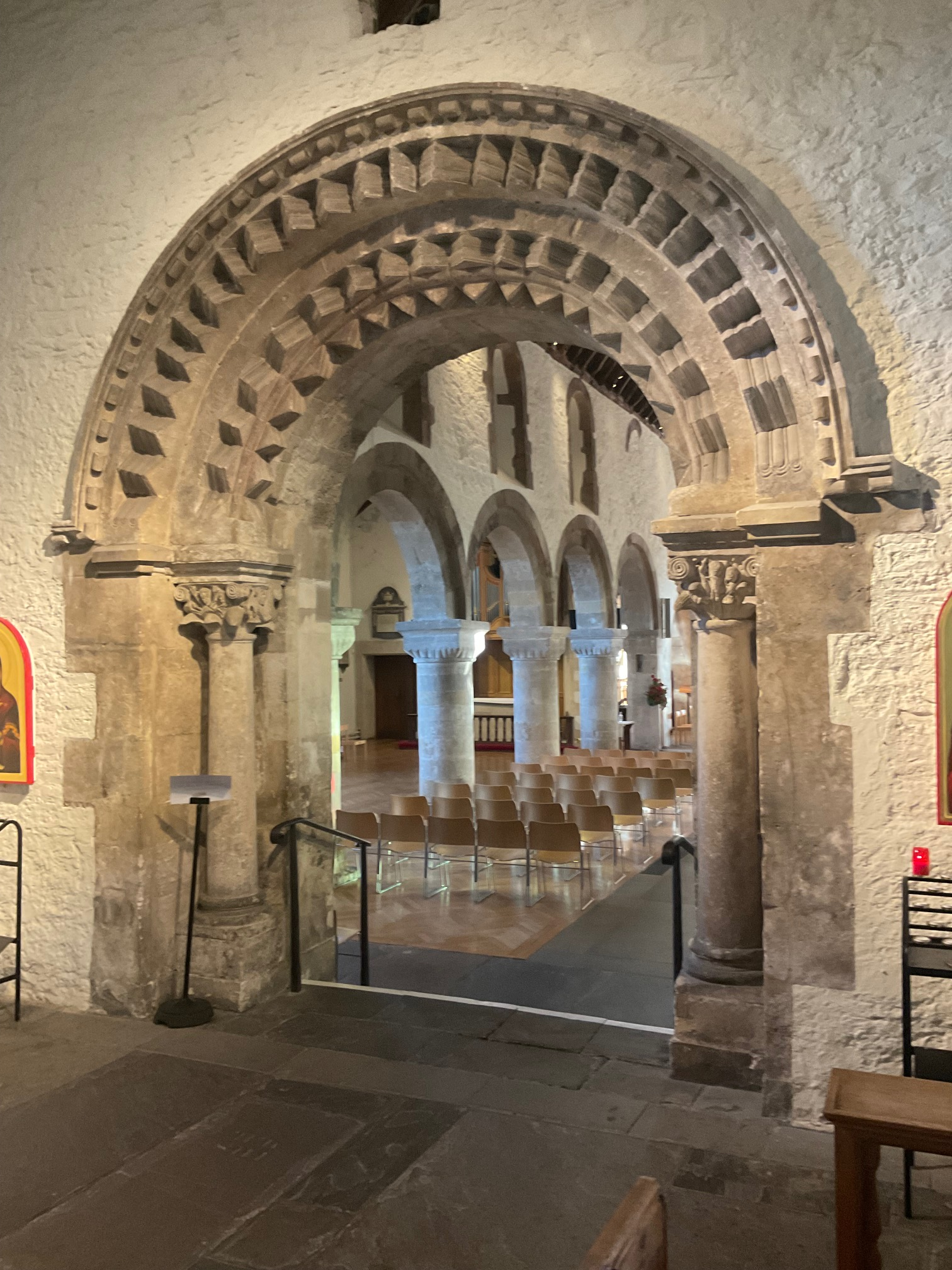
The great Romanesque portal leading from St Mary's Chapel to the main body of the cathedral to the east

It is from St Mary's chapel that we first view the chief glory of the cathedral – a twelfth-century Romanesque portal with its characteristic zig-zag chevron motifs framing the iconic view of the main body of the cathedral. The outer order of decoration is derived from Gloucester Cathedral, while the inner order has parallels in the Herefordshire School of Romanesque Sculpture. There are some remains of paint on parts of the portal, and it was almost certainly fully painted originally. The site of the archway may well mark the site of an opening to an earlier, smaller chancel, perhaps ending in an apse, before the major extension of the church took place.

The most unusual elements are the columns and capitals incorporated in the archway. The columns are definitely Roman in origin and perhaps brought from the Roman Legionary Fortress nearby at Caerleon. One theory is that they had been brought here at a rather earlier date to form part of the shrine which may have previously existed over Gwynllyw’s grave and subsequently relocated into the portal to lead the way into the new building. If so, they would be symbols of the power of his cult and the desire of the Anglo-Norman conquerors of Wales to associate themselves with him.

The capitals are of Roman Composite type and, if they were indeed also originally Roman, they have been recut. Over generations, scholars have debated what the scenes represent. They were thought to be Biblical scenes – the Creation, Fall, Flood, Baptism of Christ, and the Trinity. Scenes from the lives of Gwynllyw and Cattwg have also been suggested. More recently, it has been suggested that they were intended to be understood on two levels as the scenes may have echoes both in the Bible and in the lives of the two saints honoured at this site. The style of the hair and tunics on the figures on the north (left-hand) capital echoes fourth-century Roman art which suggests that we are indeed contemplating sculpture which looks back to the very earliest phase of Christianity in Britain. (Note: The most recent assessments of the origins of the columns and the capitals appear in two published articles.>)

== The nave and aisles ==
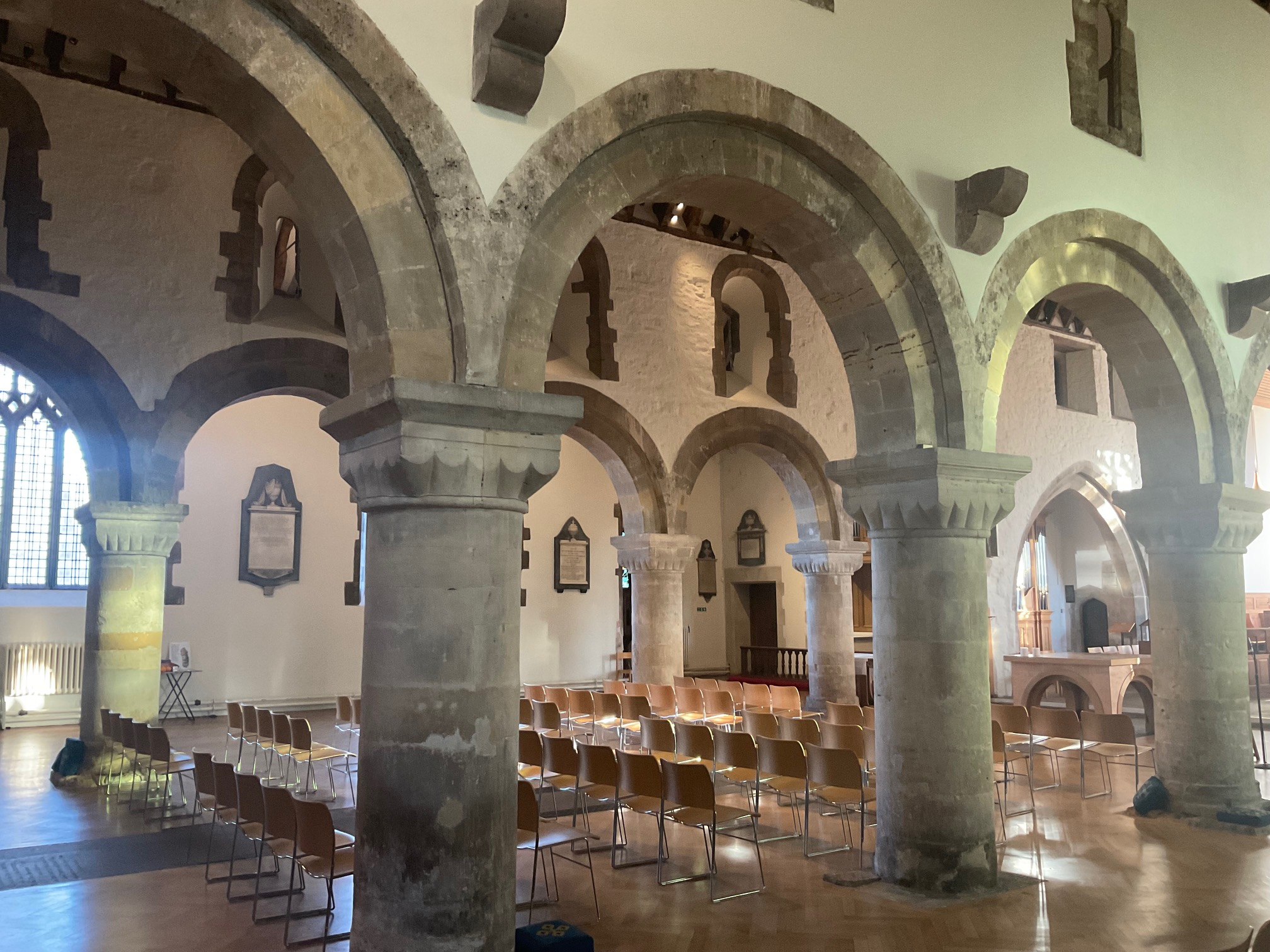
The Romanesque nave arcades seen from the south aisle

The nave consists of five Romanesque round arches rising from massive columnar piers on each side – a grand 12th century architectural scheme, but with rather less decoration than the Romanesque portal we have come through. This work was carried out under the patronage of the great abbey of Gloucester, or possibly Robert, Earl of Gloucester.

Above, the rounded clerestory windows would once have let in daylight, but are now internal windows since the aisles to north and south were rebuilt with higher roofs in the Perpendicular style of the 15th century, with characteristically pointed flatter and wider windows. While the principal aim here was to increase the capacity of the church, it might also have been a reaction to fire damage caused during an attack of followers of Owain Glyndwr in 1402, in his attempt to re-establish an independent Wales. Supporting this theory is a tree-ring date (dendrochronology) of the early fifteenth century recently given to the fine medieval wagon roof of the nave. (Note: The pre-Reformation roofs of the cathedral have been tree-ring dated by the Royal Commission on the Ancient and Historical Monuments of Wales (RCAHMW) for the National Dendrochronology Project, see primary reference number 220468 on the RCAHMW Coflein website. There are also digital images of the work in the RCAHMW National Monuments Record (Wales).)

== The east end of the cathedral ==
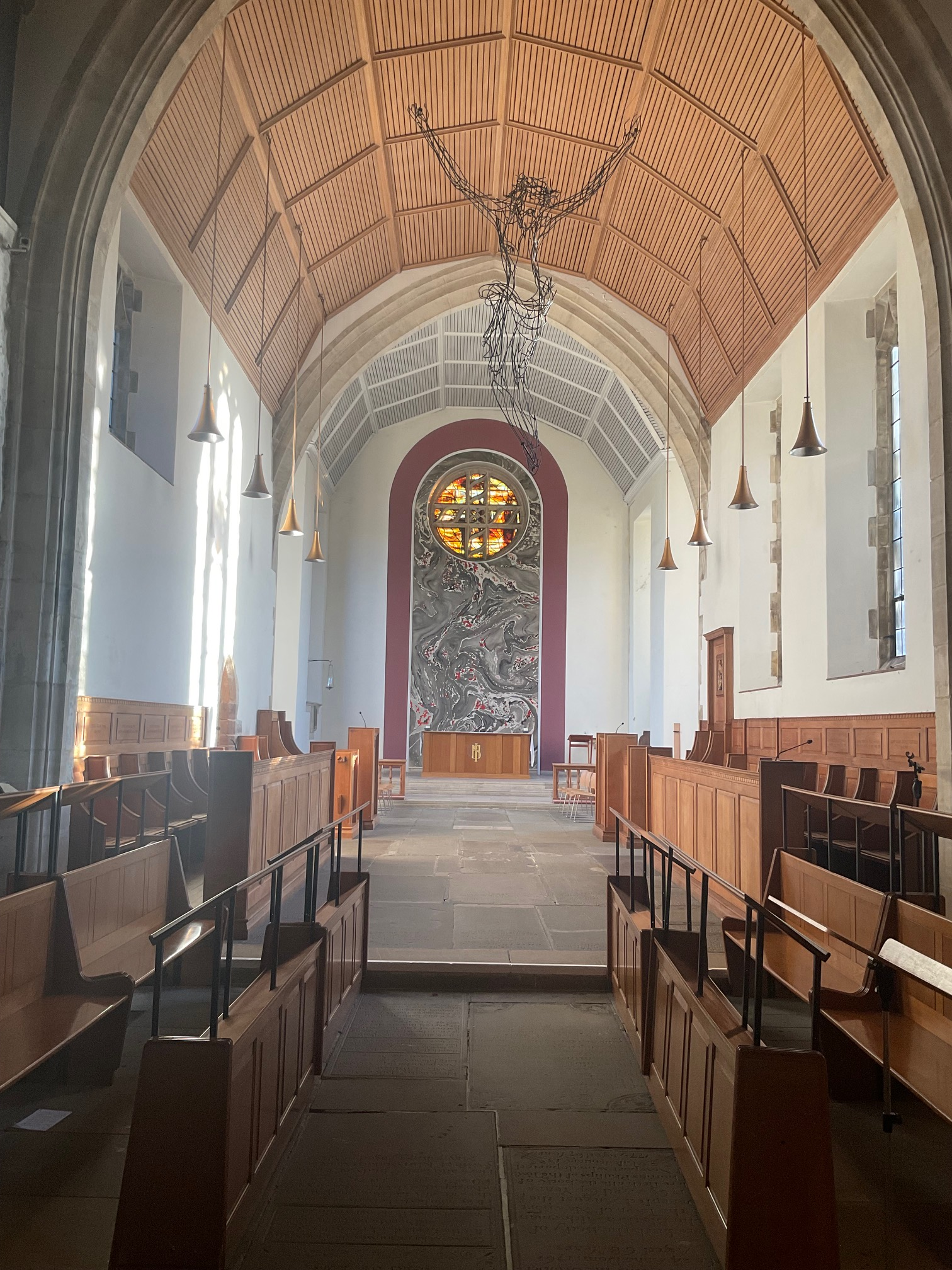
The east end of the cathedral

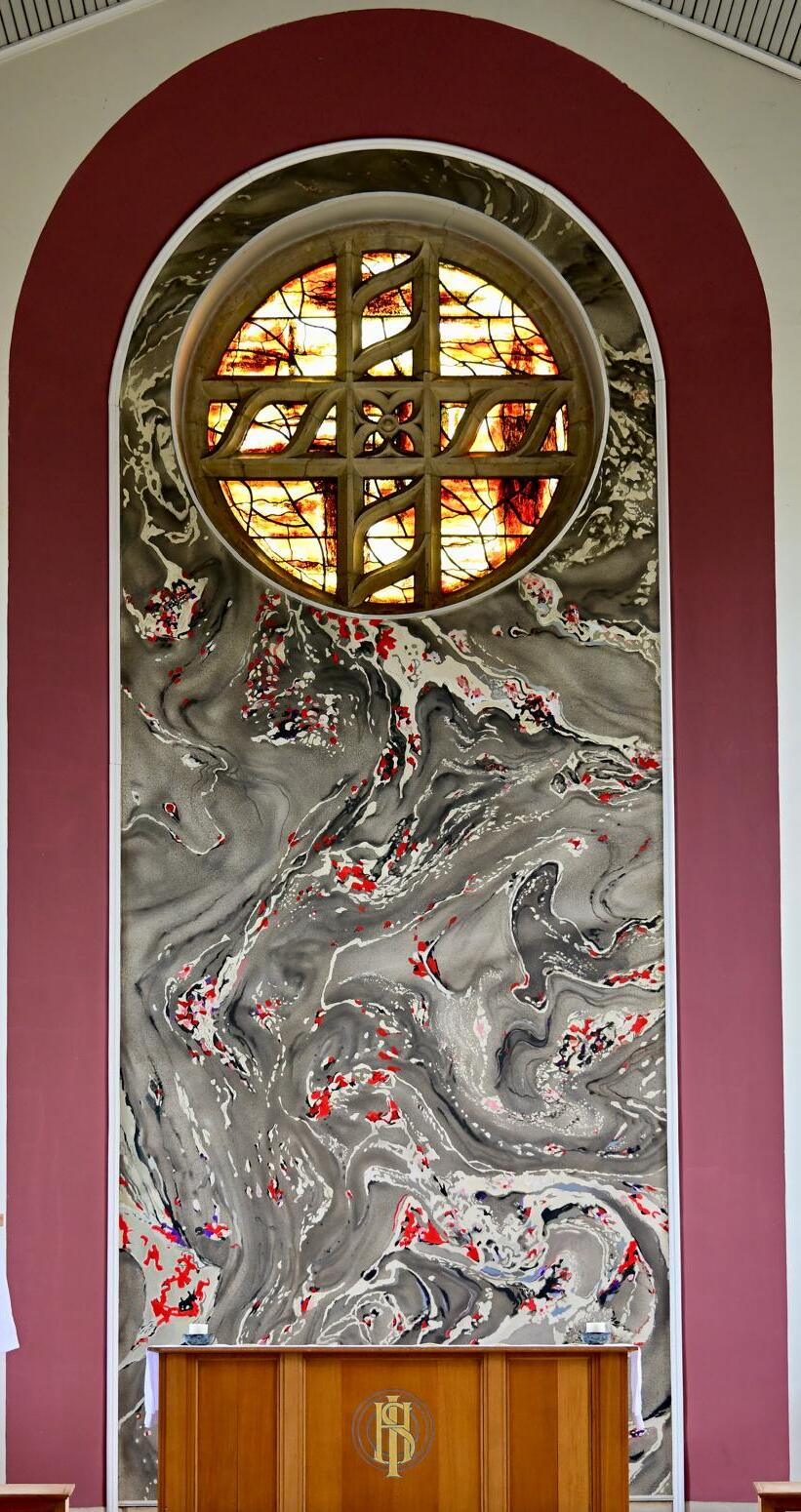
John Piper's dossal on the east chancel wall

The earlier chancel of the cathedral, regarded at the time as Victorian, or at least heavily restored by the Victorians, was demolished and rebuilt on a grander scale between 1960 and 1964 to provide a more cathedral-like chancel at the east end. The scheme also provided for a new chapel for the choir at the end of the south aisle, although the choir was subsequently relocated to its original place in front of the chancel, while the chapel, now dedicated to St Luke, is reserved for private prayer.

The architect of the extensions was Alban Caroe, whose distinguished family architectural partnership also undertook important work over several generations in Wales and elsewhere. Some regard his design as rather lacking in originality, but it does harmonise with the medieval fabric of the cathedral and the scale of the windows provide plenty of light. The east wall was decorated to the designs of John Piper in 1964. His mixed media composition incorporates a round window with tracery in the form of a double cross, filled with glass in an abstract pattern of golds and yellows made by Piper's regular collaborator Patrick Reyntiens, who enhanced Piper's design through the accomplished use of silver stain detailing. The window forms the upper element of a large painted dossal in a swirling mix of red, white, black and grey intended to give the impression of marble. Piper's design was painted on canvas by Peter Courtier, scenery maker at the Royal Opera House. The interpretation of Piper's entirely abstract work is left to the individual visitor.

In the north wall of the chancel there is a low thirteenth-century window relocated from the earlier chancel. Tradition asserts that this was a window for lepers to watch services (and in its original position would have been near the ground), but this purpose is not certain.

In the Middle Ages, at the entrance to the chancel, there would have been a rood screen with a loft and a large life-size crucifix above dividing it from the nave. The medieval doorways to the loft can still be seen high above the south west end of the chancel and at ground-level. A modern figure of the Crucified Christ now hangs in the chancel arch, the work of the Singaporean artist Tay Swee Siong.

== Monuments and tombs ==
The more important monuments and tombs include:

St Mary's chapel – Several badly mutilated medieval effigies survive in the north wall recesses of the chapel. In the central recess is a sculptured panel of four weepers bearing the heraldic arms of Sir John Morgan of Tredegar, who died in 1493, a member of the Morgan family, which was influential in South Wales for centuries right up to the twentieth century. He was rewarded with important local positions for supporting the seizure of the English crown by Henry Tudor in 1485.

West end of south aisle – The tomb of Sir Walter Herbert (died 1568). Not much of the effigy remains, but the tomb as a whole demonstrates fine Renaissance work.

East end of north aisle, (Crindau Chapel) – Memorial brass to Octavius Morgan MP FSA (1803–1885), distinguished Welsh historian and antiquarian and of the family of Sir John Morgan above. He took a great interest in the history of St Woolos. His house, The Friars, is in the parish of St Woolos. A nearby stained glass window features the arms of the Morgan family and of the Dioceses of Gloucester and Llandaff which had rights over St Woolos before the Diocese of Monmouth was created.

Niche in the last column of the nave, south arcade – Statue of Gwynllyw holding up his church in memory of Noel Morris, who died in 1967 and was the son of Edwin Morris, a former Archbishop of Wales. While there has been speculation that the sculpture may be by Elizabeth Frinck, no artistic or documentary evidence for this has yet come to light.

== Stained glass ==
Apart from two abstract twentieth century windows by Frank Roper in the north side of St Mary's Chapel, the glass is Victorian and Edwardian. Some windows have had their decorative backgrounds removed. Several are by John Hardman and Co, including the Good Samaritan in the south wall of the south aisle and Christ blessing Children in the west wall of the north aisle as well as the window of Gwynllyw, Gwladys and Cattwg illustrated above.

== Music in the cathedral ==
There is a long tradition of choral singing at the cathedral and music forms an important part in its life. The cathedral choir consists of three separate groups of singers: boys and girl choristers and adults, providing alto, tenor and bass parts. The choir sings at Sunday services and at Evensong on a Wednesday, as well as at other special services. The repertoire ranges from the seventeenth century to the twenty-first century. The cathedral is also a popular venue for musical and other artistic performances.

The cathedral organ was rebuilt in 1966 by Hill, Norman and Beard, incorporating elements from two organs: one the earlier organ in the cathedral, built by Griffin and Stroud in 1915, and the other an organ built by Hill which was salvaged from the demolished Newport Old Town Hall. This 1966 organ was rebuilt in 1997 by Nicholson of Worcester.

The organist and choirmaster is Thomas Coxhead, who was appointed in 2024.

Former Organists/Choirmasters

- 1894-1934 J A Gaccon
- 1934-1941 C J Ball
- 1941-1963 Charles St Ervan Johns
- 1964−1979 Donald Bate
- 1979 Christopher Barton
- 2015 Dr. Emma Gibbins

Former assistant organists

- 2006 Ronny Krippner (later Director of Music at Croydon Minster; currently Director of Music at Ripon Cathedral)
- 2007 Christopher Denton
- 2010 Jeremy Blasby

== Memorial to those shot during the Chartist uprising, 1839 ==
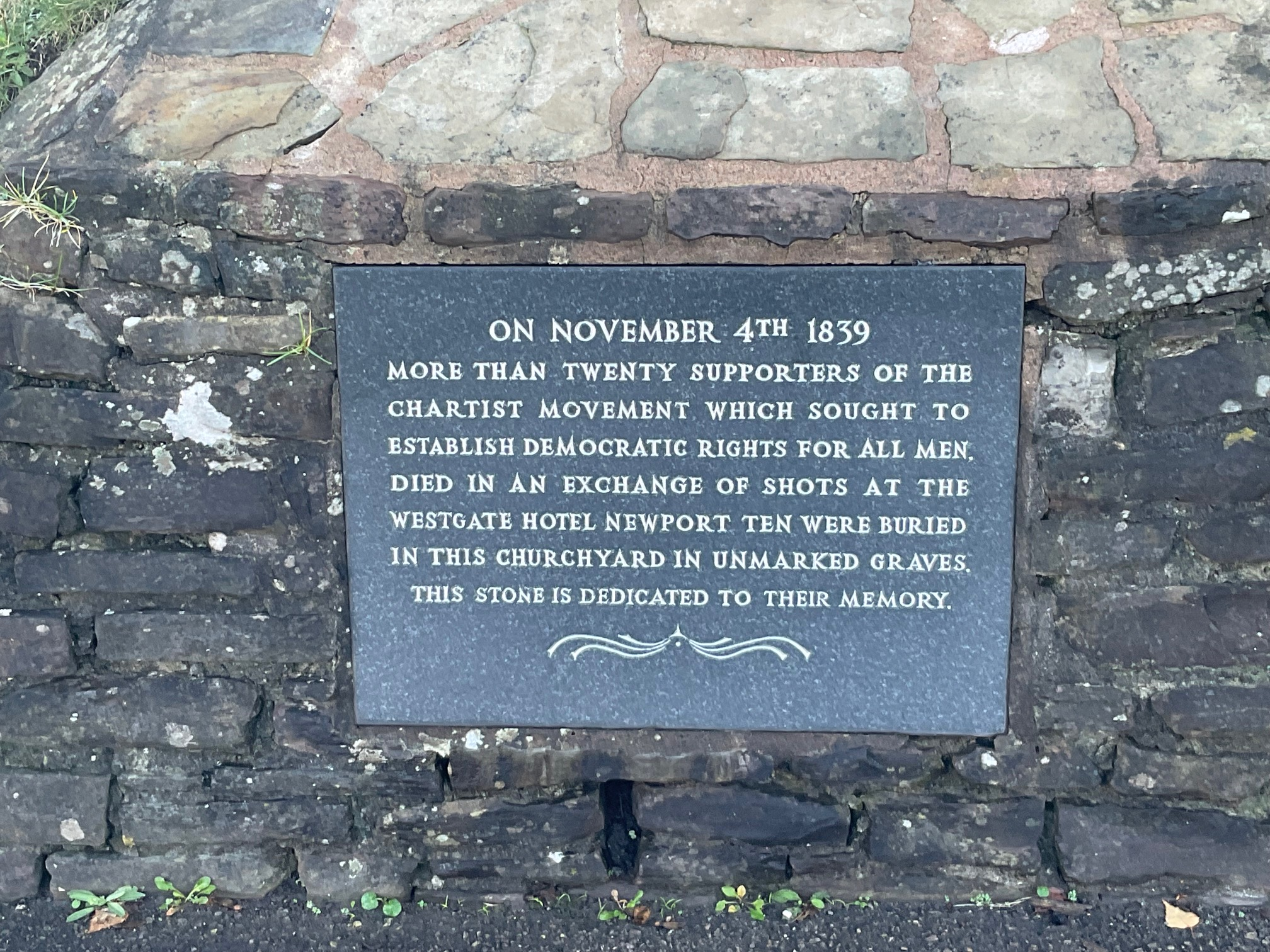
The Chartist Memorial

During the Chartist Uprising in favour of democratic rights which centred on Newport on 4 November 1839, at least 22 people were shot by a party of the 45th Regiment of Foot in front of the Westgate Hotel. Many of these would have walked past the cathedral on their way to the town centre. A memorial outside the cathedral to the left of the lychgate commemorates ten of these who were buried in unmarked graves in St Woolos churchyard. A sculpture of a large pair of nineteenth-century workman's boots is placed near the gates to the north-east of the memorial to commemorate the march of the Chartists.

== Timeline ==
- by 500: Gwynllyw builds original church
- c. 500: Gwynllyw buried
- c 1000 Church replaced with a stone structure
- c. 1050: Attacked by Irish pirates
- 12th century: Anglo-Normans build nave and archway
- c. 1200: St Mary's chapel substantially remodelled
- 1402: Damaged by followers of Owain Glyndwr
- 15th century: Tower and aisles built
- c 1650: Monuments damaged by Puritans
- 1819: St Mary's chapel restored
- 1853: Full restoration
- 1854: The new St Woolos Cemetery opens 1 mile to the west of the cathedral
- 1869: Last burials in the old graveyard in the cathedral ground
- 1913: Full restoration and re-roofing.
- 1922: Designated pro-cathedral of the Diocese of Monmouth
- 1949: Full cathedral status
- 1960–4: Chancel replaced on grander scale to designs by Alban Caroe
- 1987: Choir Chapel refurbished as St Luke’s Chapel
- 1997: Renovation of organ
- 2006: Pews removed to provide flexibility of use and sense of space and architecture
- 2011: Roof renovation

== Deans of Monmouth ==
- 1931–1946 (ret.): John Phillips
- 1946–17 March 1952 (d.): Joseph Davies
- 1952–1953 (res.): John Lloyd Thomas
- 1953–1975 (ret.): Ellis Evans
- 1976–1990 (ret.): Frank Jenkins
- 1990–1996 (ret.): Gareth Lewis
- March 1997 – May 2011 (res.): Richard Fenwick
- 10 September–21 November 2011 (d.): Jeremy Winston
- 31 March 2012 – 2018: Lister Tonge

== Deans of Newport ==
In 2018, the title of the post was changed to Dean of Newport.

- 2018–2020: Lister Tonge
- 22 May 2021 – present: Ian Black
