= John Morgan (of Tredegar) =

Welsh nobleman

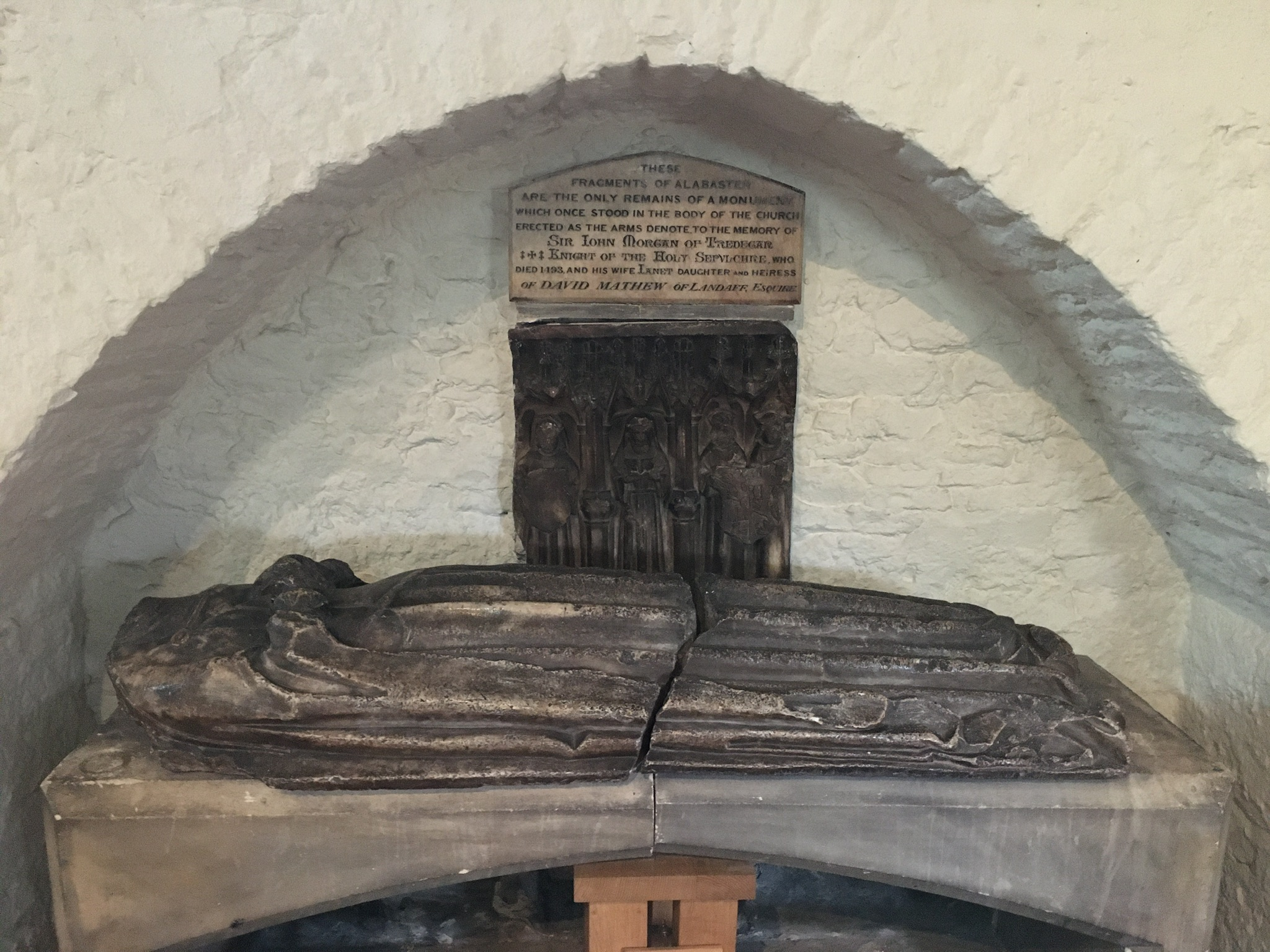
The remains of an alabaster monument to Sir John Morgan at Newport Cathedral.

Sir John Morgan (died c. 1492) was a Welsh nobleman and supporter of Henry Tudor.

== Biography ==
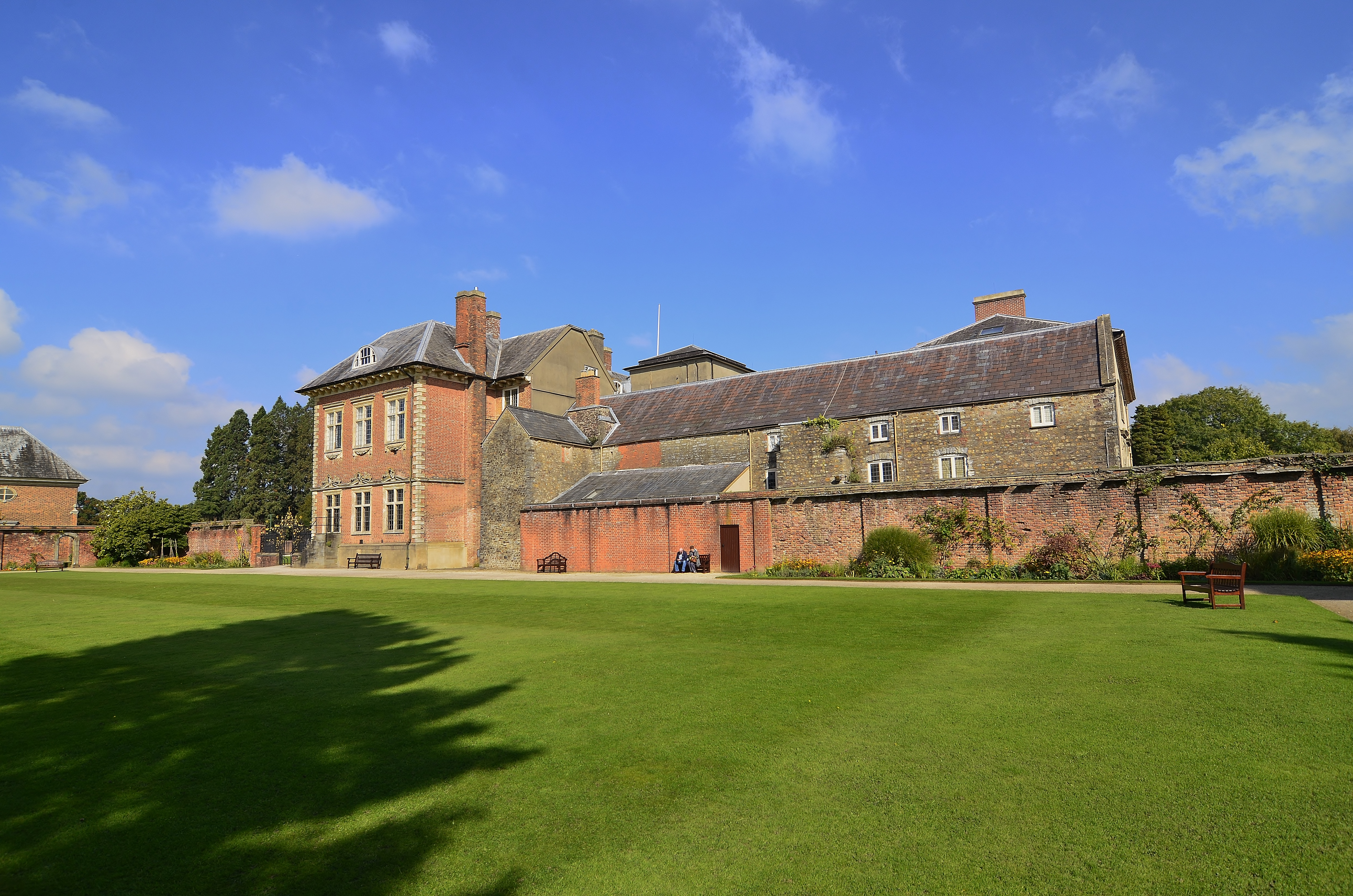
A view of the remaining wing of Sir John's Tudor Manor House (right) from the Cedar Garden.

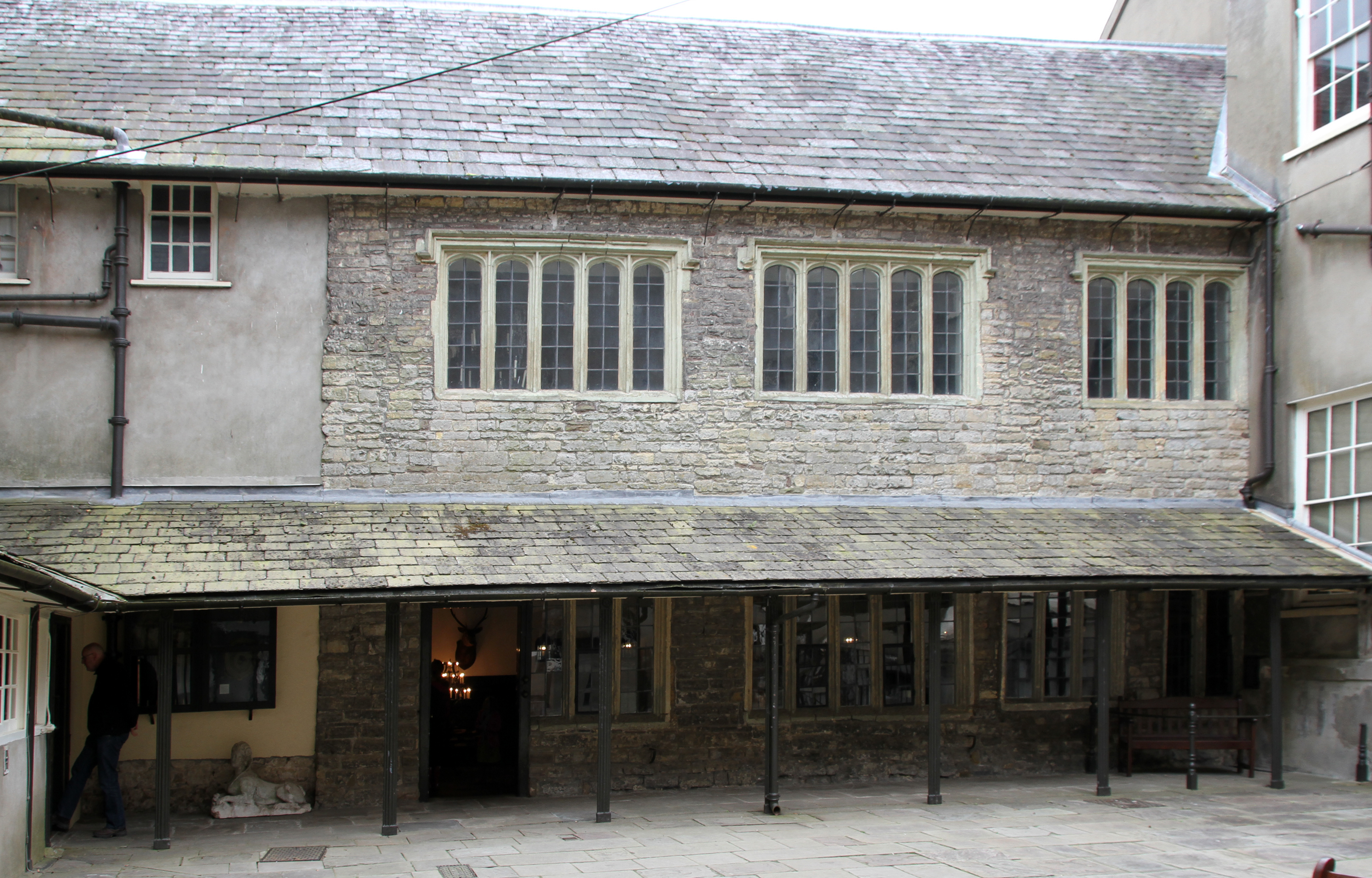
A view of the inward-facing side of the Tudor wing from the courtyard.

Sir John Morgan was a grandson of Morgan ap Llewelyn, who is recorded as living at Tredegar in 1402, the earliest record of a Morgan living there. Sir John was created a Knight of the Holy Sepulchre, possibly c. 1448, and was subsequently known as "Y Marchog Tew" ("The Fat Knight"). He was a supporter of Henry Tudor and his claim to the English Throne. Henry's ascension in 1485 was of great benefit to the Morgan family: Sir John was appointed as Sheriff of Wentloog and Newport and made Steward of the Machen Commote on 7 November 1485.

In around 1490, Sir John commissioned the building of a new manor house at Tredegar, which John Leland described in around 1540 as "a very faire place of stone". Only one wing of Sir John's manor house remains as the building was largely demolished in the 17th-century to facilitate the construction of a Restoration house; the remaining Tudor wing is the oldest part of the present-day Tredegar House. Sir John married Janet Mathew, daughter of David Mathew of Llandaf, by whom he had ten children. His second son, Thomas Morgan, was made esquire to the body of Henry VII and in the late 15th- or early 16th-century built Plas Machen, a building not dissimilar to his father's manor house at Tredegar. The Dictionary of Welsh Biography states that Sir John "probably died in 1492". The plaque to the remains of an alabaster monument to Sir John in Newport Cathedral states that he died in 1493.
