= Ellis Evans (priest) =

Welsh priest (1908–1983)

Raymond Ellis Evans (10 August 1908 – 30 December 1983) was Dean of Monmouth from 1953 to 1975.

Evans was educated at St David's College, Lampeter, and St John's College, Oxford. He was ordained deacon in 1934 and priest in 1935. After curacies in Penmaen and Newport he held incumbencies at Blackwood and Bettws before his long ministry as dean.

Church in Wales titles
Preceded by John Lloyd Thomas	Dean of Monmouth; 1953–1975	Succeeded by Frank Jenkins
