= Joseph Davies (priest) =

Irish priest (1890–1952)

Joseph Gwyn Davies (b St Davids 18 October 1890 – d Newport 17 March 1952) was Dean of Monmouth from 1946 until his death.

Davies was educated at St David's School, St David's College, Lampeter, Keble College, Oxford and Trinity College, Dublin; and ordained in 1916. After curacies in Llanelly and Aberystwyth he was Vicar of Llanganten. From 1926 to 1929 he was Chaplain at Valparaíso. He then held incumbencies in Talgarth, Cardiff and Sketty. He was also Grand Chaplain of the United Grand Lodge of England from 1947 to 1948.

Church in Wales titles
Preceded by John Leoline Phillips	Dean of Monmouth; 1946–1952	Succeeded by John Roland Lloyd Thomas
