= Annie Brewer =

Welsh nurse who served in France throughout World War One

Annie Elizabeth Mistrick
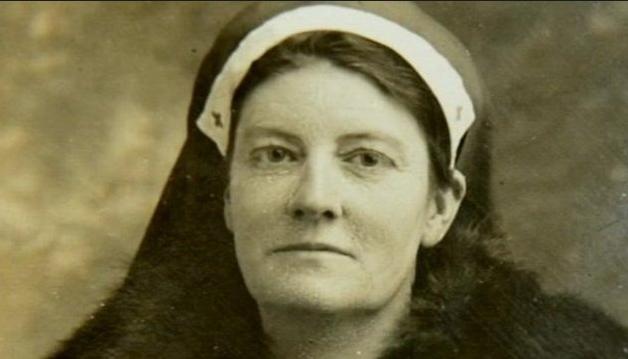
- Born: Annie Elizabeth Brewer; 21 November 1874; Newport, Wales
- Died: 30 January 1921 (aged 46); Newport, Wales
- Occupation: Nurse
- Medical career
- Field: Nursing
- Institutions: Fondation Baye
- Awards: Legion d'Honneur and Croix de Guerre

Annie Elizabeth Brewer (21 November 1874 – 30 January 1921) also known as Nancy, was a British nurse. She served in France throughout the First World War, often close to the front line, being injured in a shellfire attack. She was awarded the Legion d'Honneur and the Croix de Guerre. She also received the British War Medal and Victory Medal from the British Government but, since her death in 1921, has not been recognised by a Commonwealth War Graves Commission gravestone.

== Background ==
Annie Brewer was born in Newport, South Wales, on 21 November 1874. At the age of 24 she qualified as a nurse of 'insane persons' and worked in hospitals around Britain including in London and Chester, before travelling around Europe as a personal nurse and companion.

== War record ==
While in Paris in 1914, war broke out and she joined the French nursing and ambulance services, the Fondation Baye, serving at the Marne, the Somme and Verdun. She helped with 229 operations in 7 days at the battle of Verdun. On one occasion the ambulance in which she was travelling was shelled and she was wounded in the head and leg. She also came under shellfire while working in a French hospital. The strain led to a period of serious illness, but she insisted on returning to duty once she recovered.

== Marriage ==
She married French ambulance driver Daniel Mistrick, on the Verdun battlefield according to French genealogy sources. After the war she remained in Europe, working at a feeding station in Germany with the French army of occupation.

== Death ==
In 1921, she returned to Newport to nurse her ailing mother at 23 West Street, but was herself seriously ill and died of kidney disease, Bright's disease, on 30 January 1921 aged 46. Although she is buried at St. Woolos cemetery, she currently does not have a war grave. Gwent Western Front Association are campaigning for the Commonwealth War Graves Commission to put her on their register.

== Commemoration ==
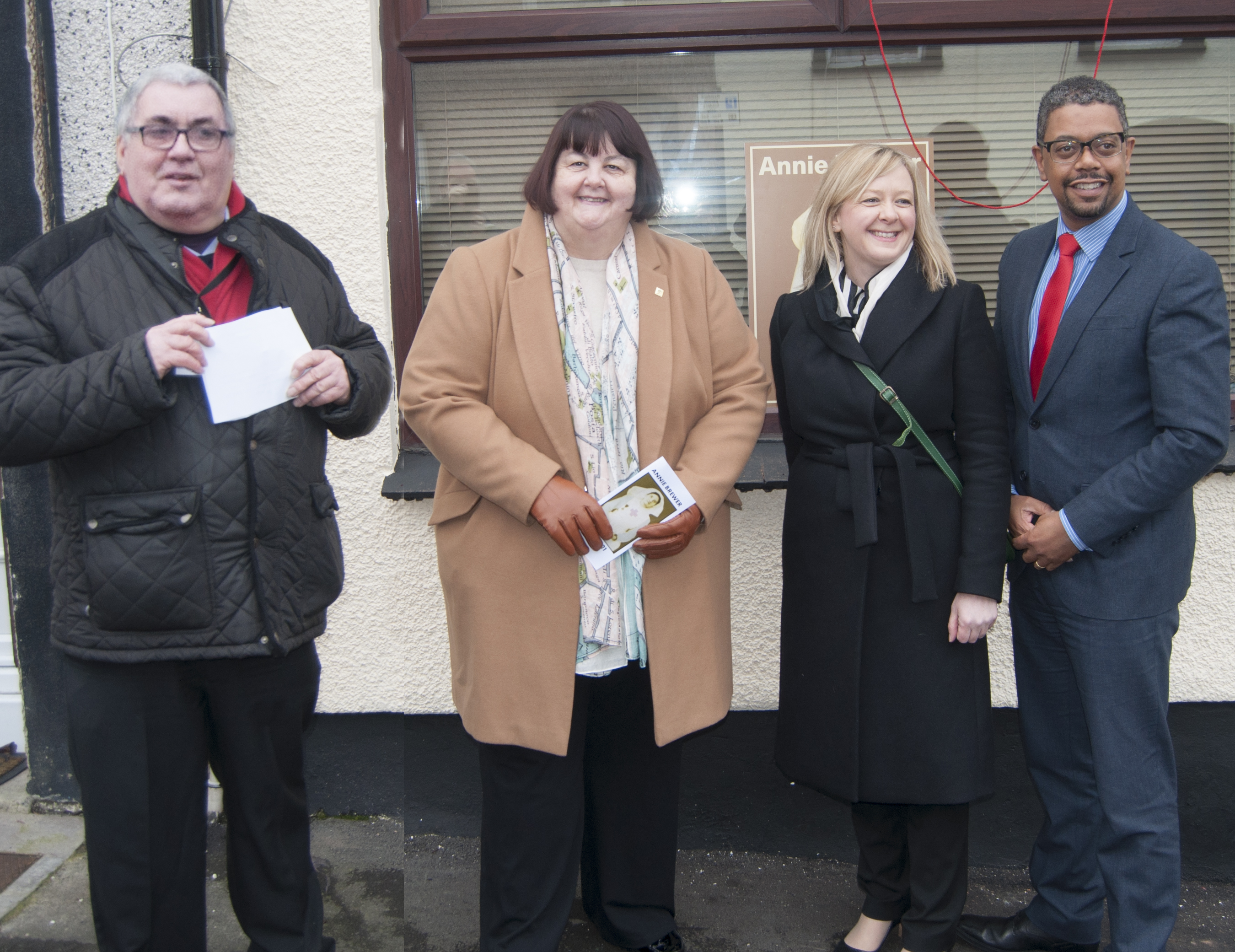
From left: Peter Strong, Gwent Western Front Association; Debbie Wilcox, Leader of Newport City Council; Jayne Bryant AM and Welsh Government Health Minister, Vaughan Gething AM; at the unveiling of a Blue Plaque to Annie Brewer at West Street Newport

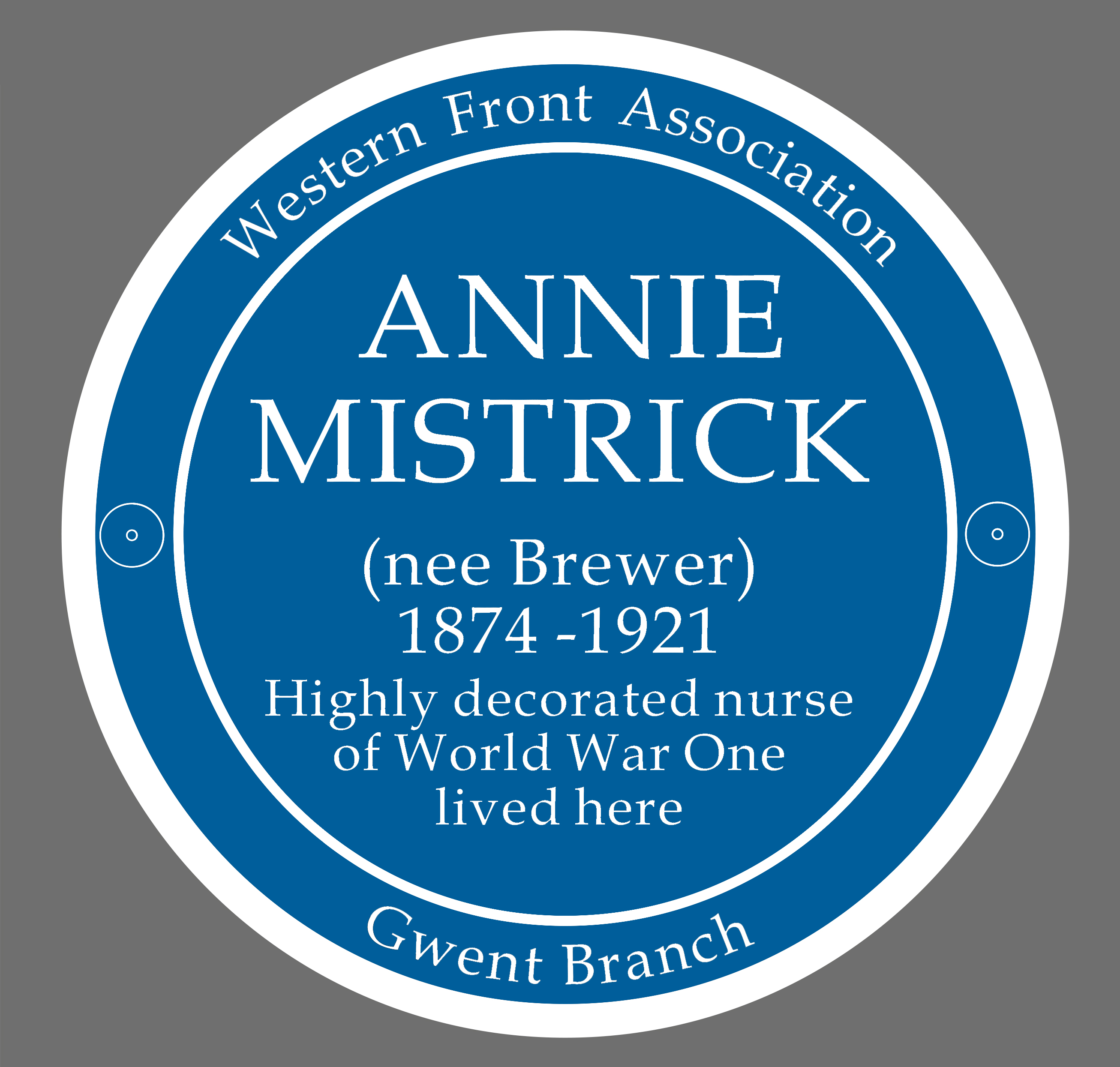
Blue Plaque for Annie Brewer at 25 West Street Newport

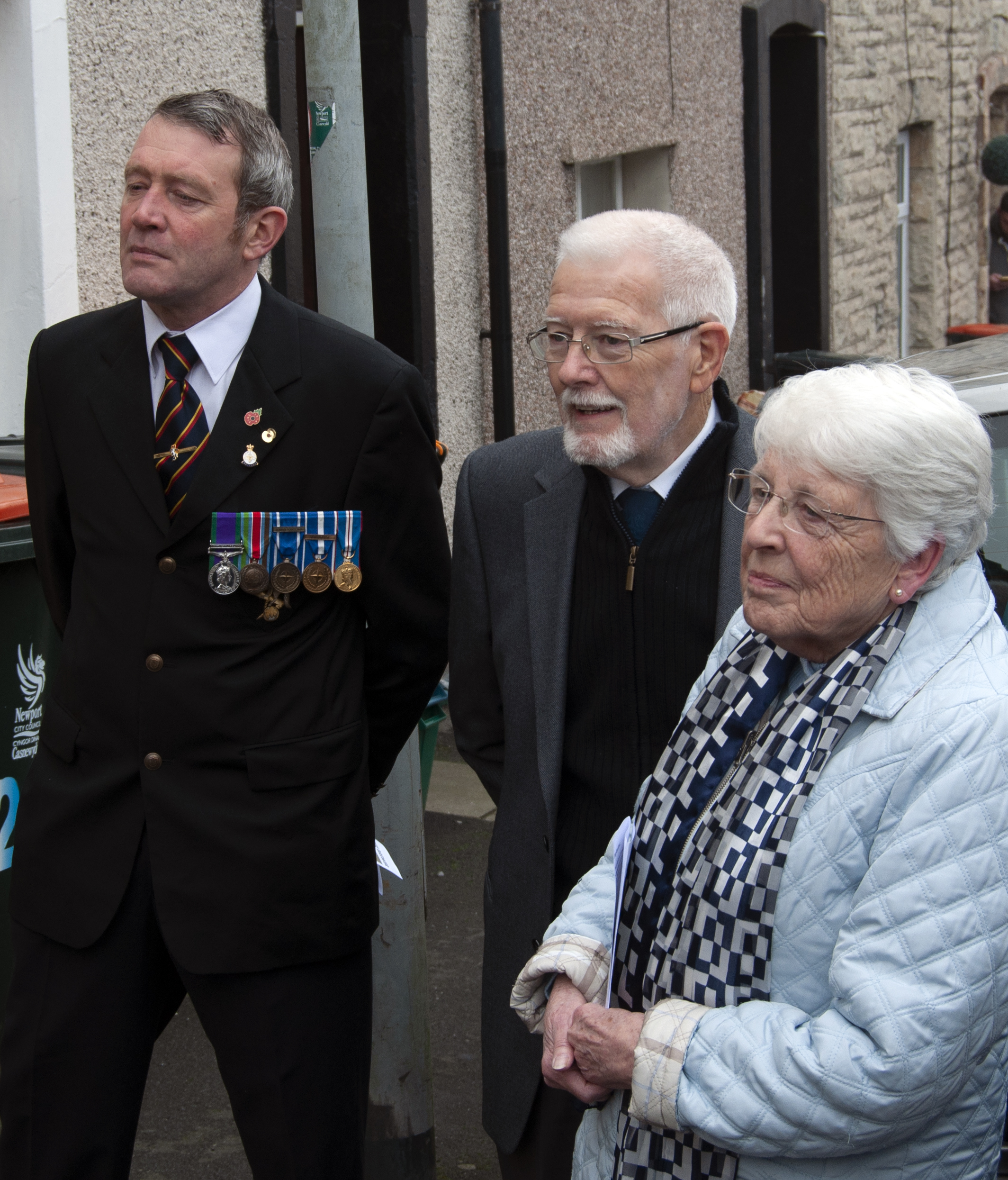
Ian Brewer and family at the unveiling

Ian Brewer, Annie's great nephew, has researched the life of Annie Brewer, published on BBC Cymru. She was also featured in BBC Wales television documentary Annie's War: A Welsh Nurse on the Western Front. The Western Front Association unveiled a blue plaque on West Street with guests including members of Mrs. Mistrick's family, Health Minister Vaughan Gething and pupils from St. Woolos primary school, on 30 January 2018.
