= Jeremy Winston =

Anglican priest (1954–2011)

Jeremy Hugh Winston (20 May 1954 – 21 November 2011) was an Anglican priest. He served as vicar of Abergavenny from 1993 until 2011, and briefly as Dean of Monmouth during 2011.

== Early life ==
Winston was born in Middlesex, near London, in 1954. After the death of his father, the family returned to Pontypool in Wales. He was educated at Griffithstown Primary School and Croesyceiliog Grammar School, where he became head boy, and then went as a music scholar to Trinity College, Carmarthen. He graduated with a B.Ed. and trained to be a teacher. He taught for a while in Llanelli Grammar School before turning to the priesthood. He studied at King's College London and at St Stephen's House, Oxford.

== Clerical career ==
He was ordained in 1980. After a curacy at St Basil, Bassaleg he was vicar of St Arvans with Penterry (Chepstow), before being appointed vicar of Abergavenny in 1993. He was appointed Area Dean of Abergavenny in 2002, and in the same year a canon of St Woolos Cathedral; and in 2011 he was installed as Dean of Monmouth. He was also a director of the Friends of Friendless Churches. He died the same year, from a brain tumor.

Church in Wales titles
Preceded by Richard Fenwick	Dean of Monmouth; 2011	Succeeded by Lister Tonge
