= Frank Jenkins (priest) =

English Anglican priest (1923–2011)

Frank Graham Jenkins (24 February 1923 – 22 October 2011) was Dean of Monmouth from 1976 to 1990.

Evans was educated at Cyfarthfa Grammar School, St David's College, Lampeter, Jesus College, Oxford and St Michael's College, Llandaff. He was ordained deacon in 1950 and priest in 1951. After a curacy in Llangeinor he was a minor canon at Llandaff Cathedral from 1953 to 1960. He was Vicar of Abertillery from 1960 to 1964, and then of Risca until his appointment as dean.

Church in Wales titles
Preceded by Ellis Evans	Dean of Monmouth; 1976–1990	Succeeded by Gareth Lewis
