= Frank Jenkins (musician) =

Frank Jenkins (1888–1945) was an American banjo and fiddle player.

He was born in 1888 in Dobson, North Carolina. Jenkins earned his living working on farms and in sawmills.

Jenkins was known for his skill as a 3-finger style banjo player, but he was also an accomplished fiddle player, winning prizes at many fiddle contests.

Jenkins played banjo in the band Da Costa Woltz's Southern Broadcasters in the 1920s. He later formed his own band, the Pilot Mountaineers, in which he played fiddle, his son Oscar played banjo, and Pop Stoneman played guitar.
