= Kloster =

Kloster is the German and Scandinavian word for monastery.

It may also refer to:

== Places ==
- Kloster, Styria
- Kloster, Denmark
- Kloster, Sweden
- Klošter, settlement in Slovenia

== People ==
- Asbjørn Kloster (1823–1876), Norwegian educator and social reformer
- Knut Kloster (1929–2020), Norwegian shipping magnate; grandson of Lauritz
- Kristin Kloster Aasen (born 1961), Norwegian Olympics official, horse breeder, and lawyer
- Lauritz Kloster (1870–1952), Norwegian shipping magnate; grandfather of Knut
- Line Kloster (born 1990), Norwegian track and field athlete
- Martin Alexander Kloster-Jensen (1917–2011), Norwegian linguist
- Robert Kloster (1905–1979), Norwegian museum director and art historian
- Uriel Ramírez Kloster (born 1999), Argentine footballer

== Other ==
- Das Kloster, a collection of magical and occult texts compiled by Johann Scheible

== See also ==
- Klosters
- Closter (disambiguation)
