= List of shipwrecks in October 1859 =

The list of shipwrecks in October 1859 includes ships sunk, foundered, grounded, or otherwise lost during October 1859.

== 1 October ==
List of shipwrecks: 1 October 1859
Ship	State	Description
Fenegina	Netherlands	The brig was wrecked at Sulina, Ottoman Empire.
Heroine	United Kingdom	The brig ran aground and sank on the Hvidodde Reef, north of Ronne, Denmark, with the loss of two of her crew. She was on a voyage from Troon, Ayrshire to Kronstadt, Russia.
Hope	United Kingdom	The barque foundered in the Atlantic Ocean. Her crew were rescued by the brig Jeune Celina (France). Hope was on a voyage from Saint John, New Brunswick, British North America to Whitby, Yorkshire.
Industry	United Kingdom	The paddle tug ran aground and sank in the Clyde at Renfrew.
Killarney	United Kingdom	The steamship ran aground in the Clyde at Spiers Point. She was on a voyage from Glasgow, Renfrewshire to Cork. She was refloated and resumed her voyage.
Viola	United Kingdom	The ship was driven ashore on Anholt, Denmark. She was on a voyage from Kirkcaldy, Fife to Riga, Russia. She was refloated and resumed her voyage.

== 2 October ==
List of shipwrecks: 2 October 1859
Ship	State	Description
Republican	France	The ship was driven ashore in a hurricane at Port-au-Prince, Haiti.

== 3 October ==
List of shipwrecks: 3 October 1859
Ship	State	Description
Agnes	Bremen	The ship was abandoned in the Atlantic Ocean. Her crew were rescued by Voltigeur (United Kingdom). Agnes was on a voyage from the Laguna River to London, United Kingdom. She came ashore in the Desertas Islands, Madeira on 28 March 1860 and was wrecked.
Argo	United Kingdom	The schooner ran aground on Sanda Island, Argyllshire. She was on a voyage from Troon, Ayrshire to Londonderry. She was refloated the next day and beached at Campbeltown, Argyllshire.
Bazilei	United Kingdom	The brig was wrecked at Port Elizabeth, Cape Colony.
Chasseur	France	The barque was wrecked at Port Elizabeth. She was on a voyage from Mozambique to Marseille, Bouches-du-Rhône.
Clara	United Kingdom	The troopship ran aground between The Manacles and Porthallow, Cornwall. She was on a voyage from Plymouth, Devon to Calcutta, India. She was refloated with the assistance of a tug and towed back to Plymouth in a leaky condition.
Ellen	United Kingdom	The schooner sprang a leak and foundered between The Manacales and St. Anthony's Lighthouse, Cornwall. She was on a voyage from Truro, Cornwall to a Welsh port.
Surat	(United Kingdom of Great Britain and Ireland) Cape Colony	The hulk was wrecked at Port Elizabeth.
Witch of the Wave	(United Kingdom of Great Britain and Ireland) Cape Colony	The brigantine was wrecked at Port Elizabeth.

== 4 October ==
List of shipwrecks: 4 October 1859
Ship	State	Description
Monarque	Belgium	The ship foundered 10 nautical miles (19 km) off Cocanada, India. Her crew were rescued. She was on a voyage from Pondicherry, India to ports on the Coromandel Coast.
William	United Kingdom	The brigantine was dismasted in the Atlantic Ocean and was abandoned in a sinking condition. Her crew were rescued by Railway (United Kingdom).

== 5 October ==
List of shipwrecks: 5 October 1859
Ship	State	Description
Blanche	France	The steamship ran aground at Helsingborg, Sweden. She was on a voyage from Bordeaux, Gironde to Kronstadt, Russia.
Cairo	United States	The full-rigged ship ran aground on the Pampero, off the Dutch coast. She was on a voyage from New York to Rotterdam, South Holland, Netherlands.
Mariana	United Kingdom	The barque was wrecked on Raine Island, Queensland. Her crew survived. She was on a voyage from Kiapara, New Zealand to Calcutta, India.
Tiber	United Kingdom	The barque ran aground on the Haisborough Sands, in the North Sea off the coast of Norfolk. She was on a voyage from Kronstadt to London. She was refloated on 9 October and taken in to Lowestoft, Suffolk.
Wallachia	United Kingdom	The brig was wrecked at Kiliya, Russia. She was on a voyage from Sulina, Ottoman Empire to Falmouth, Cornwall or Queenstown, County Cork.

== 6 October ==
List of shipwrecks: 6 October 1859
Ship	State	Description
American Congress	United States	The ship ran aground on the Owers Sandbank, in the English Channel off the coast of Sussex, United Kingdom. She was on a voyage from London to New York.
Iberia	United Kingdom	The steamship ran aground in the Clyde at Greenock, Renfrewshire. She was on a voyage from Dublin to Edinburgh, Lothian. She was refloated.
Isabella	United Kingdom	The schooner was abandoned off Cape Finisterre, Spain. Her crew were rescued by the schooner Lord Fitzgerald and Vescy (United Kingdom).
Jessica	United Kingdom	The ship foundered in the South Atlantic (10°00′S 25°39′W). Her 22 crew took to two boats. Fourteen crew on one boat were rescued by the steamship RMS Avon (United Kingdom); eight in the second boat were rescued by Duguay Trouin (France). Jessica was on a voyage from London to Bombay, India.
Little Dorette	Flag unknown	The ship was driven ashore on Hiiumaa, Russia. She was on a voyage from Havana, Cuba to Saint Petersburg, Russia. She was later refloated.
Majestic	United Kingdom	The barque ran aground at Bermuda and was damaged. She was on a voyage from St. George's, Bermuda to London. She was refloated and put back for repairs.
Mary	United Kingdom	The brig was driven ashore at Pakefield, Suffolk.
Neatine	Greece	The brig was abandoned in the Black Sea. Her crew were rescued by Australia ( Stralsund). Neatine was on a voyage from Taganrog, Russia to an English port.
Penelope	United Kingdom	The ship was abandoned in the Atlantic Ocean. Her crew were rescued by Felicia (France). Penelope was on a voyage from Quebec City, Province of Canada, British North America to Newcastle upon Tyne, Northumberland.
Sarah Johnston	(United Kingdom of Great Britain and Ireland) British North America	The schooner was driven ashore at Three Fathom Harbour, Nova Scotia. She was on a voyage from Barbados to Miramichi, New Brunswick.
Transit	United States	The schooner struck a sunken wreck in the English Channel off Portland, Dorset, United Kingdom. She was on a voyage from Galaţi, Ottoman Empire to London. She put in to Dartmouth, Devon in a severely leaky condition.
Urania	United Kingdom	The steamship ran aground on Whitburn Steel, of the coast of County Durham. Her passengers were taken off. She was on a voyage from Great Yarmouth, Norfolk to Newcastle upon Tyne, Northumberland. Urania was refloated and resumed her voyage.

== 7 October ==
List of shipwrecks: 7 October 1859
Ship	State	Description
Baseleia	United Kingdom	The snow was driven ashore and wrecked in Algoa Bay.
Brodrene	(Russian Empire) Grand Duchy of Finland	The brig was driven ashore on Starholm, Denmark. She was on a voyage from Cádiz, Spain to Turku. She had become a wreck by 11 October.
Chasseur	France	The ship was driven ashore and wrecked in Algoa Bay.
Comer	United Kingdom	The brig ran aground off Pakefield, Suffolk. She was on a voyage from Colchester, Essex to Sunderland, County Durham.
Harvey	United Kingdom	The brig was wrecked at Stormy Point, Newfoundland, British North America with the loss of twelve of her fourteen crew.
Henry and Margaret	United Kingdom	The schooner was driven ashore and severely damaged at Rock Ferry, Cheshire. She was on a voyage from Poole, Dorset to Runcorn, Cheshire.
Momolo	Austrian Empire	The barque was wrecked at Sulina, Ottoman Empire.
Nettledoing	Denmark	The galiot ran aground on the Whittaker Sand, in the North Sea off the coast of Suffolk, United Kingdom. She was on a voyage from Randers, Denmark to London, United Kingdom. She was refloated and take in to Wivenhoe, Essex, United Kingdom in a leaky condition.
Sampson	United Kingdom	The brig ran aground on the Doom Bar. She was on a voyage from London to Cardiff, Glamorgan. She was refloated and taken in to Padstow, Cornwall for repairs.
Superior	Sweden	The full-rigged ship ran aground on the Leman Sand, in the North Sea. She was on a voyage from Stockholm to Batvia, Netherlands East Indies. She floated off and sank. All on board were rescued by Albion ( (United Kingdom of Great Britain and Ireland) Guernsey).
Surat	United Kingdom	The ship was driven ashore and wrecked in Algoa Bay.
Two Sisters	United Kingdom	The brig ran aground on the Maplin Sand or the Whittaker Spit, in the North Sea off the coast of Essex. She was on a voyage from Newcastle upon Tyne, Northumberland to London. She was refloated and taken in to Harwich, Essex in a severely leaky condition.
Wild Wave	United Kingdom	The ship was driven ashore and wrecked in Algoa Bay.

== 8 October ==
List of shipwrecks: 8 October 1859
Ship	State	Description
Countess of Caithness	United Kingdom	The ship was driven ashore at "Wiken". She was on a voyage from Leith, Lothian to Stettin. She was refloated and resumed her voyage.
Duke of Cornwall	United Kingdom	The steamship was driven ashore 4 nautical miles (7.4 km) north of Aberdeen. She was on a voyage from a port in Caithness to Aberdeen.
Juno	United Kingdom	The ship ran aground in the Saint Lawrence River. She was on a voyage from Quebec City, Province of Canada, British North America to Sharpness, Gloucestershire. She was refloated and resumed her voyage.
Louise	Sweden	The schooner was driven ashore and wrecked at Cowie, Aberdeenshire. She was on a voyage from Saint Petersburg, Russia to Dundee, Forfarshire, United Kingdom.
Sphynx	(United Kingdom of Great Britain and Ireland) British North America	The barque was abandoned in the Atlantic Ocean. All on board were rescued by Queen (United Kingdom).
Star	(United Kingdom of Great Britain and Ireland) British North America	The brig was abandoned in the Atlantic Ocean. Her crew were rescued by John W. Lovitt (United Kingdom). Star was on a voyage from Halifax, Nova Scotia to Jamaica.

== 9 October ==
List of shipwrecks: 9 October 1859
Ship	State	Description
Alice	United Kingdom	The ship was wrecked on the Runnel Stone. Her crew were rescued.
Dove	United Kingdom	The schooner ran aground on the Holm Sand, in the North Sea off the coast of Suffolk. She was refloated and taken in to Lowestoft, Suffolk in a leaky condition.
Hannibal	United Kingdom	The barque was driven ashore at Sulina, Ottoman Empire.
Isabella	United Kingdom	The brig was abandoned in the North Sea 140 nautical miles (260 km) east south east of Flamborough Head, Yorkshire. Her crew were rescued by Hugh (United Kingdom). Isabella was on a voyage from Hartlepool, County Durham to Amsterdam, North Holland, Netherlands.
Nancy	United Kingdom	The ship struck a sunken rock off Land's End, Cornwall and was wrecked. Her crew were rescued by Celestine (France). She was on a voyage from Lydney, Gloucestershire to Appledore, Devon.
Sea	United Kingdom	The brig foundered in the Atlantic Ocean (44°40′00″N 11°00′05″W). Her crew were rescued.
T and C Sutton	United Kingdom	The schooner was driven ashore and wrecked near Middleton, County Durham. She was on a voyage from Saint Petersburg, Russia to Hartlepool.

== 10 October ==
List of shipwrecks: 10 October 1859
Ship	State	Description
Briton	United Kingdom	The sloop foundered off Strumble Head, Pembrokeshire. Her crew were rescued. She was on a voyage from Caldy Island, Pembrokeshire to Cardigan.
Jacama	United Kingdom	The full-rigged ship ran aground in the Strait of Banca. She was on a voyage from London to Singapore, Straits Settlements.
Margarethe	Netherlands	The ship was driven ashore and wrecked on Rodskaer.
Orient	United Kingdom	The ship was driven ashore and wrecked on Rodskaer. She was on a voyage from Hull, Yorkshire to Kronstadt, Russia.
Pallas	United Kingdom	The ship ran aground and was damaged at Hartlepool, County Durham. She was on a voyage from South Shields, County Durham to London. She was refloated and taken in to Hartlepool.
Red Port	United Kingdom	The brigantine foundered in the Mediterranean Sea off Cape Palos, Spain. Her crew were rescued by Scorpion (United Kingdom). Red Port was on a voyage from Agrigento, Sicily to Newcastle upon Tyne, Northumberland.
Ryhope	United Kingdom	The ship was driven ashore at Hartlepool. She was refloated and taken in to Hartlepool.
Susan T. Norcross	United States	The brig was abandoned in the Atlantic Ocean and sank. Her crew were rescued by J. A. Woodhouse (United States). Susan T Norcross was on a voyage from "Jaguna" to London, United Kingdom.

== 11 October ==
List of shipwrecks: 11 October 1859
Ship	State	Description
Arethusa	United Kingdom	The ship ran aground on Zaga Key, off the coast of Cuba. She was on a voyage from Zaga, Cuba to Liverpool, Lancashire.
Era	United Kingdom	The brig was driven ashore and wrecked at Hartlepool, County Durham.
Happy Return	United Kingdom	The ship driven ashore and wrecked at Bexhill-on-Sea, Sussex. She was on a voyage from Seaham, County Durham to Bexhill-on-Sea.
Henry	United Kingdom	The fishing smack was wrecked on the Scroby Sands, Norfolk. Her crew were rescued.
Jeanette Evans	United Kingdom	The ship ran aground and was wrecked at Gamle Hellesund, Norway. She was on a voyage from Riga, Russia to Hull, Yorkshire.
Lord Palmerston	United Kingdom	The brig ran aground off Tarifa, Spain. She was on a voyage from Marseille, Bouches-du-Rhône to Falmouth, Cornwall. She was refloated and taken in to Gibraltar in a leaky condition.
Marie	Greifswald	The ship was driven ashore at Gibraltar Point, Lincolnshire, United Kingdom. She was on a voyage from Greifswald to London, United Kingdom.
Providence	United Kingdom	The ship ran aground at Saint-Valery-sur-Somme, Somme, France. She was refloated the next day.
Quebec	United Kingdom	The ship ran aground on the Eddystone Rocks She was refloated with the assistance of the pilot boat Heroine (United Kingdom) with intention of beaching her, but she consequently sank 1 nautical mile (1.9 km) off Downderry, Cornwall. Her crew were rescued y HMS Topaze (Royal Navy). Quebec was on a voyage from Bordeaux, Gironde, France to South Shields, County Durham

== 12 October ==
List of shipwrecks: 12 October 1859
Ship	State	Description
Ajax	United Kingdom	The ship broke her back at Bombay, India and was condemned.
Atlas	United Kingdom	The brig ran aground and was severely damaged at Hartlepool, County Durham. She was on a voyage from South Shields, County Durham to London. She was refloated with the assistance of three tugs and taken in to Hartlepool for repairs.
Euphrates	United Kingdom	The barque was driven ashore on Inchkeith, Fife. She was on a voyage from Memel to Hull, Yorkshire. She was refloated and towed in to Leith, Lothian in a waterlogged condition.
Florence Nightingale	United Kingdom	The steamship ran aground off Porkkala, Grand Duchy of Finland.
Norma	United Kingdom	The barque was towed in to Bermuda in a sinking condition by HMS Himalaya (Royal Navy). Norma was on a voyage from British Honduras to Falmouth, Cornwall.

== 13 October ==
List of shipwrecks: 13 October 1859
Ship	State	Description
Bolina	United Kingdom	The barque was driven ashore at Redcar, Yorkshire. She was on a voyage from Sunderland, County Durham to Bordeaux, Gironde, France. She was refloated and taken in to West Hartlepool, County Durham in a leaky condition.
Norma	Wismar	The brig sprang a leak and sank 12 nautical miles (22 km) off the coast of Norway. Her crew were rescued by Aurora ( (Denmark) Duchy of Schleswig. Norma was on a voyage from Grimsby, Lincolnshire, United Kingdom to Riga, Russia.
Normandie	France	The ship was wrecked at Adra, Spain. She was on a voyage from the Gambia to Marseille, Bouches-du-Rhône.
Pacific	United States	The schooner collided with another vessel in the Magree Islands. Both vessels sank with the loss of all hands; thirteen lost in Pacific.

== 14 October ==
List of shipwrecks: 14 October 1859
Ship	State	Description
Bonita	Portugal	The ship was driven ashore at Figueira da Foz.
Buron	France	The brig was driven ashore on Governors Island, Massachusetts, United States. She was on a voyage from Saint Pierre and Miquelon to Boston, Massachusetts. She was refloated the next day and towed in to Boston.
Charlotte	United Kingdom	The ship was driven ashore at Figueira da Foz.
Danemark	Denmark	The schooner was lost in the Vlie. Her crew were rescued. She was on a voyage from Danzig to Amsterdam, North Holland, Netherlands.
Falcon	United Kingdom	The ship was wrecked on "Stoneskar". She was on a voyage from Clackmannan to Kronstadt, Russia.
Flora Temple	United States	The medium clipper was wrecked on a rock in the South China Sea with the loss of 868 lives. Survivors took to three boats. Those in one boat were rescued by the steamship Gironde (France). Twenty-nine crew in another boat reached Da Nang, Empire of Đại Nam. The third boat was reported missing. Flora Temple was on a voyage from Macao, China to Havana, Cuba.
General Codrington	United Kingdom	The steamship ran aground on the Lillegrund, in the Baltic Sea. She was on a voyage from Kronstadt to London. She was refloated on 29 October and taken in to Copenhagen, Denmark.
Josephine	France	The lugger collided with British Yeoman (United Kingdom and was consequently beached at Sunderland, County Durham, United Kingdom. She was on a voyage from Sunderland to Paimpol, Côtes-du-Nord.
Pandora	France	The schooner ran aground on the Holm Sand, in the North Sea off the coast of Suffolk, United Kingdom. She was refloated and taken in to Great Yarmouth, Norfolk, United Kingdom.
Templar	United Kingdom	The brig ran aground on the Kimmeridge Ledge, off St Albans Head, Dorset. She was on a voyage from Cardiff, Glamorgan to London. She was refloated and taken in to Weymouth, Dorset in a severely leaky condition with the assistance of HMS Blenheim (Royal Navy).

== 15 October ==
List of shipwrecks: 15 October 1859
Ship	State	Description
Agatha	United Kingdom	The barque was driven ashore near Cape Oro, Greece.
Aspasia	United Kingdom	The ship was abandoned in the Atlantic Ocean. Her crew were rescued by the barque Honour (United Kingdom). Aspasia was on a voyage from Sunderland, County Durham to Saint John, New Brunswick, British North America.
Jemima	United Kingdom	The ship was abandoned in the Irish Sea off Carlingford, County Louth. Her crew survived. She was on a voyage from Newport, Monmouthshire to a Baltic port.
Mayor	United Kingdom	The ship was abandoned in the North Sea off Winterton-on-Sea, Norfolk. Her crew were either rescued, or lost. She was on a voyage from Sunderland to a Dutch port.
Ringdove	(United Kingdom of Great Britain and Ireland) British North America	The barque was abandoned in the Atlantic Ocean. Her crew were rescued by Charles Chaloner (United States). Ringdove was on a voyage from Ardrossan, Ayrshire to Boston, Massachusetts, United States.
Robert	United Kingdom	The schooner ran aground on the Beacon Rocks. She was on a voyage from Dundee, Forfarshire to Riga, Russia. She was refloated and put back to Dundee.

== 16 October ==
List of shipwrecks: 16 October 1859
Ship	State	Description
Arabian	United Kingdom	The ship was driven ashore and wrecked in Algoa Bay.
Celibatoire	(flag) France	The ship collided with Cascade (United Kingdom and sank in the Atlantic Ocean.
Governess	United Kingdom	The ship was driven ashore and wrecked in Algoa Bay.
Howden	United Kingdom	The ship capsized and sank in the Victoria Dock, Hull, Yorkshire.
Lyme Regis	United Kingdom	The ship was driven ashore in Algoa Bay.
Prince Woronzoff	United Kingdom	The snow was driven ashore and wrecked in Algoa Bay.
Sabrina	United Kingdom	The barque was abandoned in the Atlantic Ocean (42°15′N 31°30′W). Her crew were rescued by William Jarvis (United States). Sabrina was on a voyage from Marseille, Bouches-du-Rhône, France to Boston, Massachusetts, United States.
Scotia	United Kingdom	The sloop ran aground on the Noord Haaks Bank, in the North Sea. Her crew were rescued. She was on a voyage from Fraserburg, Aberdeenshire to Harburg.
Star of the East	United Kingdom	The ship was driven ashore and wrecked in Algoa Bay.
Westmoreland	United Kingdom	The ship ran aground at Hartlepool, County Durham, her captain and mate being drunk. Consequently, both had their certificates cancelled.
Wigrams	United Kingdom	The ship was driven ashore and wrecked in Algoa Bay.

== 17 October ==
List of shipwrecks: 17 October 1859
Ship	State	Description
Arabian	United Kingdom	The ship was driven ashore and wrecked at Port Elizabeth, Cape Colony. Her crew survived.
Arrow	United Kingdom	The smack was driven ashore and wrecked at St Abbs Head, Berwickshire. Her crew were rescued. She was on a voyage from Danzig to Leith, Lothian.
Governess	United Kingdom	The ship was driven ashore and wrecked at Port Elizabeth. Her crew survived.
Huntley	United Kingdom	The ship ran aground in the River Mersey. Her crew were rescued. She had become a wreck by 27 October.
Iris	United Kingdom	The schooner caught fire and sank in the Bristol Channel off Hartland Point, Devon. She was carrying coal from Cardiff, Glamorgan, to Devoran, Cornwall.
Lyme Regis	United Kingdom	The ship was driven ashore and wrecked at Port Elizabeth. Her crew survived.
Navigator	Norway	The barque was abandoned in the Atlantic Ocean. Her fourteen crew were rescued by L. A. Allen (United States). Navigator was on a voyage from Bristol, Gloucestershire, United Kingdom to Miramichi, New Brunswick, British North America.
Prince Woronzoff	United Kingdom	The ship was driven ashore and wrecked at Port Elizabeth. Her crew survived.
Star of the East	United Kingdom	The ship was driven ashore and wrecked at Port Elizabeth. Her crew survived.
Wigrams	United Kingdom	The ship was driven ashore and wrecked at Port Elizabeth. Her crew survived.

== 18 October ==
List of shipwrecks: 18 October 1859
Ship	State	Description
Jarrow	United Kingdom	The ship ran aground at Scarborough, Yorkshire. She was on a voyage from Quebec City, Province of Canada to Scarborough.
Rainbow	United Kingdom	The ship ran aground on the Barber Sand, in the North Sea off the coast of Norfolk. She was on a voyage from Seaham, County Durham to Southampton, Hampshire. She was refloated.

== 19 October ==
List of shipwrecks: 19 October 1859
Ship	State	Description
Christine	Prussia	The brig was lost in the Jahde. Her crew survived. She was on a voyage from Riga, Russia to Bremen.
Clara Pries	Denmark	The brigantine was wrecked off Fjaltring. Her crew were rescued. She was on a voyage from Almería, Spain to Saint Petersburg, Russia.
Der Ost	Prussia	The ship was wrecked on the Scarbro Shoal. She was on a voyage from Manila, Spanish East Indies to Sydney, New South Wales.
Faria	Portugal	The ship ran aground at Porto. She was on a voyage from Rio de Janeiro, Brazil to Lisbon. She was refloated.
Merchant	United Kingdom	The ship was driven ashore and severely damaged at Seaham, County Durham. She was on a voyage from Ipswich, Suffolk to Seaham.

== 20 October ==
List of shipwrecks: 20 October 1859
Ship	State	Description
Adalbert	Flag unknown	The brig was driven ashore at Sulina, Ottoman Empire.
Anaa	Denmark	The ship was driven ashore at "Sandhale", Lincolnshire, United Kingdom. She was on a voyage from Nykøbing to Hull, Yorkshire, United Kingdom. She had broken up by 29 October.
Andrea	Flag unknown	The ship was lost at Constantinople, Ottoman Empire.
Canada	United Kingdom	The brig was wrecked off "Ferring", Denmark.
Cito	Stettin	The schooner was wrecked off Fjaltring, Denmark with the loss of her captain. She was on a voyage from Sunderland, County Durham, United Kingdom to Stettin.
Elise	United Kingdom	The ship ran aground on the Gelb Sand, in the North Sea and was abandoned by her crew. She was on a voyage from Newcastle upon Tyne, Northumberland to Harburg. She was refloated the next day and assisted in the Glückstadt, Kingdom of Hanover.
Energy	United Kingdom	The ship sprang a leak and foundered . Her crew were rescued by Thetis (United Kingdom). Energy was on a voyage from La Barre-de-Monts, Vendée, France to London.
Juno	United Kingdom	The ship ran aground at South Shields, County Durham. She was refloated and put back to South Shields in a leaky condition.
Mary	United Kingdom	The full-rigged ship was destroyed by fire at Sulina.
Pharos	United Kingdom	The smack collided with another smack and foundered off Shuna, Slate Islands. Her crew survived. She was on a voyage from Easdale, Slate Islands to Wick, Caithness. The other vessel also foundered. Her crew survived.
Punch	United Kingdom	The schooner ran aground on the Madonna Shallows, 4 nautical miles (7.4 km) off Antiparos, Greece. She was on a voyage from Newport, Monmouthshire to Corfu, United States of the Ionian Islands. She was refloated with the assistance of the steamship Dalmata (Greece) and resumed her voyage.
Viendren	Belgium	The sloop was run down and sunk in the North Sea by President (United Kingdom). Her crew were rescued by President.
Watchword	United Kingdom	The schooner sprang a leak and sank off Holyhead, Anglesey. Her crew were rescued by the steamship Prince Albert (United Kingdom). Watchword was on a voyage from Liverpool, Lancashire to Palermo, Sicily.

== 21 October ==
List of shipwrecks: 21 October 1859
Ship	State	Description
Activ	Prussia	The full-rigged ship foundered in the North Sea off Flamborough Head, Yorkshire, United Kingdom with the loss of three of her seven crew. Survivors were rescued by the schooner Clotilda (Spain). Activ was on a voyage from South Shields, County Durham, United Kingdom to Stettin.
Anna	United Kingdom	The ship was driven ashore and wrecked at "Sandhale", Lincolnshire. She was on a voyage from Nykøbing, Denmark to Hull, Yorkshire.
Ballachulish	United Kingdom	The smack collided with Pabros (United Kingdom) and foundered off Shuna, Slate Islands .
Claudia	United Kingdom	The smack was wrecked at Porthor, Caernarfonshire with the loss of all hands. She was on a voyage from Aberystwyth, Cardiganshire to Chester, Cheshire.
Guilliermina	Brazil	The schooner collided with Roderick Dhu (United Kingdom) and sank in the Atlantic Ocean 125 nautical miles (232 km) east of the Abrolhos Archipelago. All on board were rescued by Roderick Dhu.
Heika	Kingdom of Hanover	The brig ran ashore and was wrecked at South Shields. Her crew were rescued by the South Shields Lifeboat. She was on a voyage from London to South Shields.
Laurence	Belgium	The barque was driven ashore on Saaremaa, Russia. She was on a voyage from Antwerp to Kronstadt, Russia. She had become a wreck by 28 October.
Red	United Kingdom	The schooner was wrecked at Porthor. Her crew were rescued. She was on a voyage from Aberystwyth to Chester.
Victoria	United Kingdom	The ship ran aground on the Brazil Bank, in Liverpool Bay and sank. She was on a voyage from Mogador, Morocco to Liverpool, Lancashire. She was refloated and taken in tow, but consequently sank off the Magazines.

== 22 October ==
List of shipwrecks: 22 October 1859
Ship	State	Description
Agnes	United Kingdom	The ship ran aground on the West Rocks, in the North Sea off the coast of Essex. She was on a voyage from Sunderland, County Durham to London. She was refloated and resumed her voyage.
American	United Kingdom	The ship ran aground on the Point Neuf Shoals, in the Saint Lawrence River. She was on a voyage from Liverpool, Lancashire to Quebec City, Province of Canada, British North America. She was later refloated and taken in to Quebec City, where she arrived on 29 October.
Annie Lawson	United Kingdom	The ship was wrecked on the Punta Brava Rocks, off the coast of Uruguay.
Chesterfield	United Kingdom	The schooner was driven ashore and wrecked at the Point of Ayr, Flintshire. She was on a voyage from Truro, Cornwall to Holywell, Flintshire.
Colonist	United Kingdom	The ship ran aground on the White Island Reef. She was on a voyage from Liverpool, Lancashire to Quebec City, Province of Canada, British North America. She was refloated with the assistance of the steamship Victoria ( (United Kingdom of Great Britain and Ireland) British North America
Enterprise	United Kingdom	The ship was driven ashore near Kronstadt, Russia. She was on a voyage from Liverpool to Kronstadt.
Freundschaft	Prussia	The ship was driven ashore and wrecked near Treptow an der Rega. She was on a voyage from Königsberg to Antwerp, Belgium.
Hinde	United Kingdom	The ship ran aground on the Shipwash Sand, in the North Sea off the coast of Suffolk. She was on a voyage from South Shields, County Durham to London. She was refloated and made for Lowestoft, Suffolk.
Mary	United Kingdom	The brig was driven onto the Herd Sand, in the North Sea off the coast of County Durham. She was on a voyage from Dundee, Forfarshire to South Shields, County Durham. She was refloated and taken in to South Shields.
Mercury	United Kingdom	The brig was driven ashore near Helsingborg, Sweden. She was on a voyage from Copenhagen, Denmark to Helsingborg.
Panope	United Kingdom	The brig ran aground on the Holm Sand, in the North Sea off the coast of Suffolk. Her crew were rescued. Panope was on a voyage from Sunderland, County Durham to London. She was refloated and taken in to Lowestoft, Suffolk in a leaky condition.
Percy	United Kingdom	The brig ran aground on the Holm Sand. Her crew were rescued. Percy was on a voyage from Sunderland to London. She was refloated and taken in to Lowestoft in a leaky condition.
Santa Petronella	Spain	The barque was wrecked on the Punta Brava Rocks, off the coast of Uruguay.
Swallow	United Kingdom	The ship driven ashore at Narva, Russia. Her crew were rescued.
Vrouw Renske	Netherlands	The ship was driven ashore on Norderney, Kingdom of Hanover with the loss of all but two of her crew. She was on a voyage from Newcastle upon Tyne, Northumberland, United Kingdom to Lübeck.

== 23 October ==
List of shipwrecks: 23 October 1859
Ship	State	Description
Betsey	United Kingdom	The brig ran aground at Calais, France. She was refloated.
Concurrent	United Kingdom	The ship departed from Falmouth, Cornwall for Hull, Yorkshire. No further trace, presumed foundered with the loss of all hands.
Dina	Norway	The ship was driven ashore at Hulsbeck. Her crew were rescued. She was on a voyage from Hartlepool, County Durham, United Kingdom to Holmstad.
Lawrence	Flag unknown	The ship was driven ashore on Saaremaa, Russia. She was on a voyage from Antwerp, Belgium to Kronstadt, Russia.
Manuelita	Flag unknown	The ship was driven ashore at Narva, Russia. Her crew were rescued.
Mary	United Kingdom	The brig ran aground on the Herd Sand, in the North Sea off the coast of County Durham. She was on a voyage from Dundee, Forfarshire to South Shields, County Durham. She was refloated and taken in to South Shields in a leaky condition.
Oder	United Kingdom	The steamship departed from West Hartlepool, County Durham for Bordeaux, Gironde, France. No further trace, presumed foundered with the loss of all hands.
Pilot	United Kingdom	The schooner was driven ashore and wrecked at Dover, Kent with the loss of three of her four crew. She was on a voyage from Havre de Grâce, Seine-Inférieure, France to Hamburg.
Tolvo	Russia	The ship was driven ashore near the Catharinenthal Palace, Reval.

== 24 October ==
List of shipwrecks: 24 October 1859
Ship	State	Description
Anna Maria	United Kingdom	The schooner departed from Chester, Cheshire for Hayle, Cornwall. No further trace, presumed foundered during the Royal Charter Storm with the loss of all hands.
Brothers	United Kingdom	The schooner was driven ashore and wrecked at Sker Point, Glamorgan. Her three crew were rescued by the Tenby Lifeboat. She was on a voyage from Waterford to Porthcawl, Glamorgan.
Eleanor, and Kendal Castle	United Kingdom	Eleanor collided with Kendal Castle and drove ashore at Bideford, Devon. All on board were rescued. Eleanor was on a voyage from Cardiff, Glamorgan to Liverpool, Lancashire. She was refloated on 27 October and taken in to Bideford. The crew of Kendal Castle, except her captain, were reported to have gone aboard Eleanor. Kendal Castle also drove ashore.
Emil and Carl	Lübeck	The ship was wrecked on Hogland, Russia with the loss of all hands. She was on a voyage from Lübeck to "Frederickstadt".
Ernte	Grand Duchy of Oldenburg	The full-rigged ship ran ashore on "Sommars" and sank with the loss of all but two of her six crew. She was on a voyage from Kronstadt, Russia to London, United Kingdom.
Jane M. Thurston	United States	The barque was driven ashore at Pendennis Castle, Cornwall, United Kingdom. She was refloated with the assistance of the tug Dandy (United Kingdom) and taken in to Falmouth, Cornwall.
Jeune Celestine	France	The chasse-marée capsized in the English Channel off the Charpentiers Rocks. Her crew were rescued.
Jeune Marie	France	The ship sank off the Île-d'Aix, Charente-Inférieure. Her crew were rescued.
Lavinia	United Kingdom	The brig was driven ashore at Falmouth. She was on a voyage from Taganrog, Russia to Falmouth.
Leven	United Kingdom	The schooner departed from Chester for Barrow-in-Furness, Lancashire. No further trace, presumed foundered in the Royal Charter Storm with the loss of all hands.
Neptune	Norway	The yacht was sighted off Wick, Caithness, United Kingdom. Presumed subsequently foundered in the Royal Charter Storm.
Oscar	Sweden	The brig was driven ashore at St. Mawes, Cornwall. She was on a voyage from Sundsvall to Lisbon, Portugal. She was refloated and towed in to Falmouth in a waterlogged condition.
Royal Albion	United Kingdom	Joan of Arc (France) drove into Royal Albion, which sank in the River Thames at Erith, Kent with the loss of two of her crew.
St. Michel	France	The steamship was wrecked on the Lavardin Rocks. She was on a voyage from Marennes, Charente-Inférieure to Dunkirk, Nord.
Troy	United States	The vessel foundered in Lake Huron with the loss of 18 lives while carrying passengers and wheat. Eight people survived.
Union	United Kingdom	The sloop was driven ashore and wrecked at Worms Head, Glamorgan. She was on a voyage from Bridgwater, Somerset to Llanelly, Glamorgan.
Urania	Norway	The ship was driven ashore at Kloster, Denmark. She was on a voyage from Porto, Portugal to Stavanger, Norway.
328	Russia	The lighter sank whilst on a voyage from "Stieglitz" to Kronstadt.

== 25 October ==
List of shipwrecks: 25 October 1859
Ship	State	Description
Abbey	United Kingdom	The schooner was wrecked in Kingsgate Bay with the loss of all hands. Her crew, being drunk, refused the assistance of the Broadstairs and Margate Lifeboats.
Active	United Kingdom	The ship was damaged at Bangor, Caernarfonshire.
Active	United Kingdom	The smack was driven ashore at Clovelly, Devon. She was on a voyage from Newport, Monmouthshire to Liverpool, Lancashire. She was later refloated and taken in to Clovelly.
Adur	United Kingdom	The ship was damaged at Bangor, Caernarfonshire.
Alert	United Kingdom	The ship ran aground and capsized at Woodend, Cheshire.
Alice	United Kingdom	The ship was damaged at Bangor, Caernarfonshire.
Alice Ann	United Kingdom	The ship was damaged at Bangor, Caernarfonshire.
Alliance	United Kingdom	The ship was damaged at Bangor, Caernarfonshire.
Alma	United Kingdom	The ship was damaged at Bangor, Caernarfonshire.
Ann	United Kingdom	The schooner was driven ashore and severely damaged at Lyme, Dorset.
Ann and Elizabeth	United Kingdom	The ship was wrecked at Bangor, Caernarfonshire.
Ann and Susan	United Kingdom	The ship was damaged at Bangor, Caernarfonshire.
Ariadne	United Kingdom	The cutter was wrecked at Saltdean, Sussex. Her crew were rescued. She was on a voyage from Málaga, Spain to Leith, Lothian.
Arthur Wyaat	United Kingdom	The ship was damaged at Bangor, Caernarfonshire.
Avance	Sweden	The brig ran aground on the Herd Sand, in the North Sea off the coast of County Durham, United Kingdom.
Baretto Junion	United Kingdom	The barque was wrecked in the Mozambique Channel off "Maoote Island" with the loss of eleven of her eighteen crew.
Benjamin	United Kingdom	The ship sank at Bridlington, Yorkshire with the loss of all five crew. She was on a voyage from Hartlepool, County Durham to London.
Black Agnes	United Kingdom	The schooner was driven ashore at Blyth, Northumberland. Her crew were rescued. She was on a voyage from Leith, Lothian to the River Tyne. Black Agnes was refloated on 28 October and taken in to Blyth.
Blanche Marie	France	The schooner was driven on to rocks and sank at Guernsey, Channel Islands. Her seven crew were rescued by HMS Firefly (Royal Navy). Blanche Marie was on a voyage from Dieppe, Seine-Inférieure to Guernsey.
Boston	United Kingdom	The ship was severely damaged at Bangor, Caernarfonshire.
Busy	United Kingdom	The sloop was abandoned in the Bristol Channel 8 miles (13 km) south of Lundy Island, Devon. Her four crew were rescued. Busy was on a voyage from Newport, Monmouthshire to Pentewan, Cornwall. She came ashore at Port Isaac, Cornwall.
Caledonia	United Kingdom	The schooner collided with the schooner Curlew (United Kingdom) and sank 30 nautical miles (56 km) south west by west of the Smalls Lighthouse. Two crew were rescued by Curlew.
Caroline	Norway	The brig was driven ashore and wrecked at Dungeness, Kent with the loss of three of her crew.
Catherine	United Kingdom	The ship was damaged at Bangor, Caernarfonshire.
Catherine	United Kingdom	The ship was driven ashore at Cemaes, Anglesey. Her crew were rescued. She was on a voyage from Amlwch, Anglesey to Liverpool.
Catherine and Jane	United Kingdom	The ship was damaged at Bangor, Caernarfonshire.
Catherine Thomas	United Kingdom	The schooner was wrecked on Lundy Island. All hands presumed lost.
Conservative	United Kingdom	The ship sank at Bangor, Caernarfonshire.
Corner	United Kingdom	The ship was driven on to the Insand, in the North Sea off the coast of County Durham.
Dart	United Kingdom	The ship was damaged at Bangor, Caernarfonshire.
Douro	United Kingdom	The ship was damaged at Bangor, Caernarfonshire.
Eliza	United Kingdom	The smack was driven ashore and wrecked at the Mumbles, Glamorgan. Her crew were rescued.
Elizabeth	United Kingdom	Captain Evans's ship was damaged at Bangor, Caernarfonshire.
Elizabeth	United Kingdom	Captain Williams's ship was damaged at Bangor, Caernarfonshire.
Elizabeth Lass	United Kingdom	The brig was wrecked in Redlap Cove, Devon with the loss of a crew member. She was on a voyage from Kinsale, County Cork to Lymington, Hampshire.
Ellen and Esther	United Kingdom	The schooner was driven ashore and damaged at Newport, Pembrokeshire. She was on a voyage from Caernarfon to Hamburg.
Emily	United Kingdom	The ship was damaged at Bangor, Caernarfonshire.
Equity	United Kingdom	The ship sank at Bangor, Caernarfonshire.
Frederick William	United Kingdom	The schooner was driven ashore at Sunderland, County Durham.
Gaulois	France	The steamship ran aground in the Coueron Pass. She was on a voyage from Nantes, Loire-Inférieure to Bordeaux, Gironde. She was refloated and put back to Nantes.
George IV	United Kingdom	The ship was damaged at Bangor, Caernarfonshire.
Honiton Packet	United Kingdom	The ship was driven ashore at Lyme.
Isa	United Kingdom	The schooner foundered off the mouth of the River Tay with the loss of all hands. She was on a voyage from Sunderland to Dundee, Forfarshire.
Isabella	United Kingdom	The brig was driven ashore and wrecked at Dungeness. Her crew were rescued. Her crew survived. She was on a voyage from Sunderland to Caen, Calvados, France.
Isabella	United Kingdom	The ship was dismasted and sank at Bangor, Caernarfonshire.
James and Francis	United Kingdom	The ship departed from Great Yarmouth, Norfolk for Goole, Yorkshire. Presumed subsequently foundered with the loss of all hands; a boat was discovered in the North Sea before 31 October.
Jane	United Kingdom	Captain Gray's ship was dismasted and sank at Bangor, Caernarfonshire.
Jane	United Kingdom	Captain Roberts's ship was damaged at Bangor, Caernarfonshire.
J. C. Wade	United Kingdom	The ship was damaged at Bangor, Caernarfonshire.
John Abbey	United Kingdom	The ship was driven ashore at Kingsgate, Kent with the loss of all hands.
John and Sarah	United Kingdom	The ship was damaged at Bangor, Caernarfonshire.
John St. Barbe	United Kingdom	The ship was wrecked between Lavernock Point and Penarth, Glamorgan with the loss of a crew member.
John Wesley	United Kingdom	The ship was lost off Padstow with the loss of all hands.
John White	United Kingdom	The brig ran aground on the Whittaker Sand. She was on a voyage from Middlesbrough, Yorkshire to Rochester, Kent. She was refloated on 27 October and towed to Strood, Kent in a severely leaky condition and was beached there.
Julia	United Kingdom	The ship ran aground at South Shields. She was on a voyage from Havre de Grâce, Seine-Inférieure, France to South Shields. She was refloated.
Juno	United Kingdom	The schooner was driven ashore at Sunderland. Her crew were rescued by rocket apparatus. She was on a voyage from Scarborough, Yorkshire to Sunderland.
J. W. Johnson	United Kingdom	The schooner was wrecked on "Hoftea Island", Russia. Her crew were rescued. She was on a voyage from Liverpool to Narva, Russia.
Llansantfraid Trader	United Kingdom	The ship was damaged at Bangor, Caernarfonshire.
Louis Napoleon	United Kingdom	The ship was damaged at Bangor, Caernarfonshire.
Magdalene	United Kingdom	The schooner was driven ashore at Falmouth, Cornwall. She was on a voyage from Genoa, Kingdom of Sardinia to Aberystwyth, Cardiganshire. She was refloated on 30 October.
Margaret	United Kingdom	The ship was damaged at Bangor, Caernarfonshire.
Margaret and Ann	United Kingdom	The ship sank at Bangor, Caernarfonshire.
Margaret Lloyd	United Kingdom	The dandy foundered in the Irish Sea off Cardigan Island, Cardiganshire. Her eight crew were rescued by the Cardigan Lifeboat ( Royal National Lifeboat Institution).
Margaret Reed	United Kingdom	The ship was driven against the pier and severely damaged at Lowestoft, Suffolk. She was on a voyage from Newcastle upon Tyne, Northumberland to Plymouth, Devon.
Maria and Jane	United Kingdom	The ship was damaged at Bangor, Caernarfonshire.
Mariner	United Kingdom	The smack was driven ashore and wrecked at the Mumbles, Glamorgan. She was on a voyage from Wicklow to Swansea.
Marlborough	United States	The barque was wrecked on the Redcliff Rocks, in the Bristol Channel 2 nautical miles (3.7 km) west of Combe Martin, Devon with the loss of two lives. She was on a voyage from Baltimore, Maryland to Swansea, Glamorgan.
Martha	United Kingdom	The Amlwch-registered ship was damaged at Bangor, Caernarfonshire.
Martha	United Kingdom	Captain Jones's ship was severely damaged at Bangor, Caernarfonshire.
Martha	United Kingdom	The schooner was wrecked at Pengarnon Point, Pembrokeshire. Her crew were rescued. She was on a voyage from Neath, Glamorgan to Aberayron, Cardiganshire.
Mary Ann	United Kingdom	The schooner struck the wreck of Northern Bell (United Kingdom) and sank off the coast of Kent. Her four crew were rescued by the lugger Queen (United Kingdom). Mary Ann was on a voyage from Newcastle upon Tyne to Caen, Calvados, France.
Mathilda	United Kingdom	The schooner was wrecked at Newport, Monmouthshire with the loss of all hands.
Matthew Owens	United Kingdom	The schooner was driven ashore at Peterstone, Monmouthshire. She floated off and was subsequently driven ashore at Nash Point, Glamorgan.
Mouche	France	The schooner was driven ashore at Roscoff, Finistère. She was on a voyage from Sunderland to "Moricq". She was refloated the next day.
Nell	United Kingdom	The ship was severely damaged at Bangor, Caernarfonshire.
Nevin	United Kingdom	The ship was damaged at Bangor, Caernarfonshire.
Parsboro	United Kingdom	The collier, a brig, was driven ashore in the Belfast Lough near Cultra, County Antrim.
Port Penrhyn	United Kingdom	The ship was damaged at Bangor, Caernarfonshire.
Pride of Anglesea	United Kingdom	The ship was damaged at Bangor, Caernarfonshire.
Primera Galan	Spain	The brig was driven ashore and wrecked at Dover, Kent with the loss of three of her crew. She was on a voyage from Havana, Cuba to Bremen.
Priscilla	United Kingdom	The ship was damaged at Bangor, Caernarfonshire.
Sarah	United Kingdom	The ship was wrecked at Rouse Point, Glamorgan with the loss of all hands. She was on a voyage from Bristol to Cardigan.
Sea Wave	United Kingdom	The barque collided with Grand Trianon (United Kingdom) and was abandoned off the Bishop Rock, Isles of Scilly. Her crew were rescued by Grand Trianon. Sea Wave was on a voyage from Valparaíso, Chile to Liverpool. She was discovered off Strumble Head, Pembrokeshire on 29 October and towed in to Holyhead by the tug Briton Ferry (United Kingdom).
Syren	United Kingdom	The ship was run down and sunk in the North Sea off Whitby, Yorkshire by Victoria (United Kingdom) with the loss of four of her nine crew. Survivors were rescued by Victoria.
Two Brothers	United Kingdom	The ketch was driven ashore and severely damaged at Lyme.
Union	United Kingdom	The sloop was driven ashore at Worms Head, Glamorgan. Her crew survived. She was on a voyage from Bridgwater, Somerset, to Llanelli, Glamorgan.
Villa de Rivadeo	Spain	The barque was wrecked on the Porth Golman Rocks, off Bardsey Island, Pembrokeshire, United Kingdom with the loss of a crew member. She was on a voyage from Havana, Cuba to Liverpool, Lancashire, United Kingdom.
Vine	United Kingdom	The ship was damaged at Bangor, Caernarfonshire.
Vron	United Kingdom	The ship was damaged at Bangor, Caernarfonshire.
William	United Kingdom	The brig was driven ashore and wrecked at Lyme. Her crew were rescued.
William and Martha	United Kingdom	The ship was driven ashore at Scarborough. She was on a voyage from London to Scarborough. She was refloated on 28 October and taken in to Scarborough.
Unidentified smack	United Kingdom	The fishing smack was wrecked at Bangor, Caernarfonshire.
Unidentified ships	Flags unknown	Two vessels were lost on the Stones reef, Cornwall.
Unidentified ships	Flags unknown	Three ships (a barque, a brigantine and a schooner) were lost on Lundy Island in addition to Catherine Thomas mentioned above.
Unidentified sloop	Flag unknown	The sloop was wrecked at Newport, Monmouthshire with the loss of all hands.

== 26 October ==
List of shipwrecks: 26 October 1859
Ship	State	Description
A. B. Thompson	United Kingdom	The ship was driven ashore at Falmouth, Cornwall.
Acorn	United Kingdom	The ship sank at Penarth, Glamorgan.
Adeona	United Kingdom	The ship was wrecked near Strumble Head, Pembrokeshire. her crew were rescued.
Admiral Cator	United Kingdom	The steamship struck the pier and sank at West Hartlepool, County Durham. Her crew were rescued. She was on a voyage from Rotterdam, South Holland, Netherlands to West Hartlepool. She was refloated and taken in to Hartlepool.
Affo	United Kingdom	The sloop was driven ashore at Weston-super-Mare, Somerset.
Agnes	United Kingdom	The brig was wrecked at Dulas, Anglesey with some loss of life.
Amphitrite	Flag unknown	The ship was driven ashore at Falmouth. She was on a voyage from Belize City, British Honduras to London, United Kingdom.
Anais	France	The lugger was driven ashore and wrecked at Newquay, Cornwall, United Kingdom. Her crew were rescued by the Coast Guard using rocket apparatus. She was on a voyage from Cardiff, Glamorgan to Nantes, Loire-Inférieure.
Ann	United Kingdom	While carrying iron ore, the snow from Blyth, Northumberland, was stranded and lost on Morte Point, Devon in a north-westerly force 11 gale with the loss of all hands.
Ann	United Kingdom	The ship was driven ashore at West Hartlepool.
Ann	United Kingdom	The ship was driven ashore at Newquay. Her crew survived.
Ann	United Kingdom	The ship was driven ashore at Crantock, Somerset. Her crew were rescued by the Coast Guard using rocket apparatus. She was on a voyage from Plymouth, Devon to Milford Haven, Pembrokeshire.
Anna Dorothea	Norway	The barque was driven ashore at Lymington, Hampshire, United Kingdom. Her thirteen crew were rescued by the Coast Guard using rocket apparatus. She was on a voyage from Santa María la Antigua del Darién, Granadine Confederation to London
Anna Maria	United Kingdom	The ship was driven ashore and wrecked at Watchet, Somerset. Her crew were rescued.
Anne	United Kingdom	The schooner was driven ashore near Crantock. Her crew were either rescued, or lost. Anne was on a voyage from Penzance, Cornwall to Saundersfoot, Pembrokeshire. She was refloated the next day.
Annie	United Kingdom	The schooner was wrecked at Newquay. Her crew were rescued. She was on a voyage from Plymouth to Cardiff.
Atlas	United Kingdom	The brig was driven ashore at Middleton, County Durham. She was on a voyage from Dieppe, Seine-Inférieure, France to Hartlepool. She was refloated on 12 December and taken in to Hartlepool.
Auguste	United Kingdom	The ship was driven ashore and damaged at Hartlepool, County Durham.
Bahamian	United Kingdom	The barque was severely damaged in the Canada Dock, Liverpool, Lancashire.
Bard	United Kingdom	The ship was driven ashore and wrecked at Porthdinllaen, Caernarfonshire.
Beeswing	United Kingdom	The ship was driven ashore and damaged at Hartlepool.
Betsey	United Kingdom	The ship ran aground and was wrecked at Doniford, Somerset. Her crew survived.
Beverley	United Kingdom	The ship was driven ashore and wrecked at Stratton, Cornwall with the loss of one of the seven people on board. Survivors were rescued by the Coast Guard. She was on a voyage from Swansea, Glamorgan to Youghal, County Cork.
Blanche	United Kingdom	The ketch was driven ashore and sank at Penarth. Her crew were rescued. She was on a voyage from Tralee, County Kerry to Penarth.
Breeze	United Kingdom	The ship was driven ashore and wrecked at Port Isaac, Cornwall. Her crew were rescued.
Brigantine	United Kingdom	The ship was wrecked at Cardiff with the loss of all hands.
Britannia	United Kingdom	The ship was driven ashore in Ceibwr Bay. She was on a voyage from Port Madoc, Caernarfonshire to Newport, Monmouthshire. She became a wreck on 1 November.
British Rover	United Kingdom	The ship was driven ashore and wrecked at Bilsdean, Lothian. Her crew were rescued. She was on a voyage from Berwick upon Tweed, Northumberland to Scarborough, Yorkshire.
Bubona	United Kingdom	The schooner was driven ashore and wrecked 2 nautical miles (3.7 km) east of North Berwick, Lothian with the loss of all hands. She was on a voyage from Sunderland, County Durham to Aberdeen.
Campion	United Kingdom	The ship was driven ashore and damaged at Hartlepool.
Carnarvon Packet	United Kingdom	The ship was driven ashore at Port Dinorwic, Caernarfonshire.
Caroline	United Kingdom, and Taliesen	The sloop was driven into the steamship Taliesen (and then drove ashore at Burnham-on-Sea, Somerset. Taliesen also drove ashore.
Caroline	United Kingdom	The schooner was driven ashore at Bridgwater, Somerset.
Caroline	United Kingdom	The ship was driven ashore at Perranuthnoe, Cornwall. Her crew were rescued. She was on a voyage from Neath, Glamorgan to Weymouth, Dorset.
Carolina	Denmark	The barque was driven ashore and wrecked at Porthgain, Pembrokeshire. Her crew were rescued. She was on a voyage from Dublin to Cardiff.
Catherine	United Kingdom	The Mersey Flat was driven ashore in Rhos Bay.
Ceres	United Kingdom	The ship was driven ashore near Dunster, Somerset.
Charles George Fryer	United Kingdom	The schooner was driven ashore in Widemouth Bay near "Mellock", Cornwall. Her crew survived. She was on a voyage from Cork to Cardiff.
Cherry	United Kingdom	The Mersey Flat was driven ashore in the River Dee.
Clara	France	The schooner was stranded and a total loss on Morte Point and became a total loss.
Croggs	United Kingdom	The ship was driven ashore and damaged at Hartlepool.
Cuba, and Mary Anne	United Kingdom	The brig Cuba collided with the schooner Mary Anne and was then driven ashore and wrecked at Winterton-on-Sea, Norfolk. Cuba was on a voyage from Hartlepool to London. Mary Anne was also driven ashore and wrecked. She was on a voyage from Blyth to Great Yarmouth, Norfolk. There was only one survivor from Cuba amongst the eleven men that formed both crews.
Cyril	United Kingdom	The schooner was driven ashore and severely damaged at Flint. She had been refloated by 31 October.
Diana	United Kingdom	The schooner sprang a leak and foundered 12 nautical miles (22 km) off Douglas Head, Isle of Man. Her crew were rescued. She was on a voyage from Maryport, Cumberland to Belfast, County Antrim.
Dovey Packet	United Kingdom	The sloop was driven ashore and severely damaged at Aberdovey, Merionethshire. She was on a voyage from Aberdovey to Flint. She was refloated.
Drake	United Kingdom	The coaster was lost near Portreath, Cornwall.
Duke of York	United Kingdom	The ship was driven ashore and damaged at Hartlepool.
Ebenezer	United Kingdom	The ship was driven ashore and wrecked at the Mumbles. Her crew were rescued.
Edward Protheroe	United Kingdom	The ship was driven ashore and wrecked at Sandy Mouth, north of Bude with the loss of four of her five crew
Eleanor	United Kingdom	The brig was driven ashore and severely damaged at West Hartlepool.
Eleanor	United Kingdom	The schooner ran aground on the Northern Burrows, off the coast of Devon. Her crew were rescued. She was on a voyage from Cardiff to Liverpool. She was refloated the next day and taken in to Bideford, Devon.
Eleanor	United Kingdom	The ship was driven ashore at Flint.
Eliza	United Kingdom	The schooner was wrecked at "Porthferyn", Pembrokeshire with the loss of all hands.
Eliza	flag unknown	The brig was driven ashore at Teignmouth, Devon with the loss of a crew member.
Eliza and Jane	United Kingdom	The schooner was driven ashore in Cardigan Bay. She was on a voyage from Port Madoc to Bristol, Gloucestershire. She was refloated on 11 December and resumed her voyage.
Elizabeth, and Paragon	United Kingdom	The schooner Elizabeth collided with the brig Paragon and was driven ashore and wrecked at Great Yarmouth. Her crew were rescued by rocket apparatus. Paragon was also driven ashore at Great Yarmouth. Her crew were rescued by rocket apparatus. She was on a voyage from South Shields to London. Paragon was refloated on 7 November and taken in to Great Yarmouth.
Eliza Beynon	United Kingdom	The ship was run ashore and wrecked at the Mumbles, Glamorgan. Her crew were rescued.
Eliza Emma	United Kingdom	The ship was driven ashore and damaged at Hartlepool.
Eliza	United Kingdom	The schooner was driven ashore near North Berwick. Her crew were rescued. Eliza was subsequently run into by John and May (United Kingdom). She was on a voyage from Sunderland to Grangemouth, Stirlingshire and /or Montrose, Forfarshire. She was refloated and found to be severelh damaged.
Ellen, England, John and Ann, and Prince of Wales	United Kingdom	The barque England was driven into Ellen, John and Ann and the smack Prince of Wales then drove ashore at Holyhead, Anglesey. England was on a voyage from Liverpool to New Orleans, Louisiana, United States. She was refloated on 7 November and taken in to Holyhead. Ellen, John and Ann and Prince of Wales also drove ashore. Ellen was on a voyage from Bangor, Caernarfonshire to Belfast, County Antrim. John and Ann was on a voyage from Conway, Caernarfonshire to Dublin. Prince of Wales was on a voyage from Arklow, County Wicklow to Woodend, Cheshire.
Ellen Gwenllen	United Kingdom	The smack was driven ashore and wrecked at Barnstaple, Devon with the loss of one of her three crew. She was on a voyage from Bristol to Tenby, Pembrokeshire.
Emma	United Kingdom	The brig was driven ashore and severely damaged in the River Thames at Erith, Kent. Her crew were rescued. She was on a voyage from London to Exmouth, Devon.
Endeavour	United Kingdom	The sloop was driven ashore at Aberdovey. Her four crew were rescued by the Aberdovey Lifeboat. She was on a voyage from Port Madoc to Portsmouth, Hampshire. She was refloated on 28 October.
Enterprise	United Kingdom	The ship was driven ashore and wrecked 7 nautical miles (13 km) south of Bridlington, Yorkshire with the loss of a crew member. She was on a voyage from Middlesbrough, Yorkshire to London.
Endeavour	United Kingdom	The sloop ran aground at Aberdovey. She was refloated and taken in to Aberdovey for repairs.
Enterprise	United Kingdom	The full-rigged ship was driven into the tug Endeavour (United Kingdom) and severely damaged at Erith.
Ernest	France	The chasse-marée was driven ashore and severely damaged at Saint-Nazaire, Loire-Inférieure.
Evadne	United Kingdom	The ship ran aground on a reef south of Graemsay, Orkney Islands. She was on a voyage from Sunderland to Veracruz, Mexico. She was refloated.
Exeter	United Kingdom	The trow foundered at Burnham-on-Sea, Somerset. Her four crew were rescued.
Fairy Queen	United Kingdom	The pilot boat was driven ashore and wrecked at Burnham-on-Sea.
Fame	United Kingdom	The ship was wrecked at Mostyn, Flintshire. Her crew were rescued.
Fanny Kemble	United Kingdom	The ship was driven ashore in Bridgwater Bay. All six people on board were rescued.
Favourite	United States	The full-rigged ship was driven ashore and wrecked at Stepper Point, Cornwall. Her crew were rescued. She was on a voyage from London to Padstow, Cornwall and/or a Welsh port.
Firebrick	United Kingdom	The sloop sank at Mostyn. She was on a voyage from Mostyn to Rhuddlan, Denbighshire.
Fly	United Kingdom	The ship was driven ashore and damaged at Hartlepool.
Forth	United Kingdom	The ship caught fire when her cargo of quicklime got wet. She was on a voyage from Sunderland to Aberdeen. She was escorted in to Aberdeen by Heather Bell (United Kingdom).
Four Brothers and Four Sisters	United Kingdom	The ship was driven ashore and severely damaged at Cardiff. She was refloated on 28 October and taken in to Penarth for repairs.
Foulkes	United Kingdom	The brig was driven ashore at Holyhead. She was on a voyage from Chester, Cheshire to Drogheda, County Louth.
Francis Langley	United Kingdom	The ship was wrecked on the Robber Platte, in the North Sea. Her crew were rescued.
Frederick and Alfred	United Kingdom	The ship was driven ashore at Hendon, County Durham. Her crew were rescued by rocket apparatus. She was on a voyage from King's Lynn, Norfolk to Seaham, County Durham.
Freya	Russia	The barque was severely damaged by fire at Cardiff.
Friends	United Kingdom	The sloop was driven ashore and wrecked at Bettws, Carmarthenshire. Her crew were rescued.
George and Mary	United Kingdom	The sloop was driven ashore in the River Thames. Her crew were rescued by a lifeboat.
George and Mary	United Kingdom	The sloop was driven ashore at Filey, Yorkshire. Her three crew were rescued by the Filey Lifeboat. She had broken up by 31 October.
George Boutland	United Kingdom	The schooner sank in the North Sea 2 nautical miles (3.7 km) north of Berwick upon Tweed, Northumberland with the loss of all hands.
Gipsy	United Kingdom	The schooner was driven ashore and sank at Holyhead. She was on a voyage from Queensferry, Flintshire to Drogheda, County Louth.
Glory	United Kingdom	The schooner was driven ashore and severely damaged at Holyhead. She was on a voyage from the River Dee to Drogheda, County Louth.
Grace	United Kingdom	The ship was driven ashore and damaged at Hartlepool.
Greyhound	United Kingdom	The pilot boat was driven ashore at Penarth.
Happy Family	United Kingdom	The ship was driven ashore and damaged at Hartlepool.
Happy Return	United Kingdom	The smack was driven ashore and wrecked near Boscastle, Cornwall. Her crew were rescued. She was on a voyage from Bideford to "Portgavron" or Appledore, Devon to Cardiff.
Hawkhill	United Kingdom	The brig was wrecked on the Black Rocks, on the coast of County Durham. Her crew were rescued.
Henrietta	United Kingdom	The ship was wrecked on the Sprat Sands, in the English Channel off the coast of Devon.
Henry	United Kingdom	The pilot boat was driven ashore and wrecked at Burnham-on-Sea.
Hero	United Kingdom	The ship was driven ashore at Dale, Pembrokeshire. She was on a voyage from Milford Haven to Dieppe.
Hills	United Kingdom	The schooner was driven ashore and wrecked at Seaton Carew, County Durham with the loss of two of her crew.
Hope	United Kingdom	The ship was driven ashore in Bridgwater Bay.
Hope	United Kingdom	The ship was driven ashore and severely damaged at Portland, Dorset.
Idas	United Kingdom	The ship was run ashore at Nelson Point, Somerset. She was on a voyage from Arkhangelsk, Russia to Gloucester.
Iron Age	United Kingdom	The vessel foundered off Trevose Head, Cornwall with the loss of her entire crew of eleven.
Isabella	United Kingdom	The brig was driven ashore at Middleton. She was refloated on 31 October and taken in to Hartlepool.
Isabella	United Kingdom	The coble was abandoned off Hartlepool. Both crew were rescued by the Redcar Lifeboat. She was subsequently driven ashore and damaged at Hartlepool.
James and Ann	United Kingdom	The ship was driven ashore and severely damaged at the Mumbles.
James and Jessie	United Kingdom	The sloop was driven ashore and wrecked at the Britannia Pier, Great Yarmouth. Her four crew were rescued. She was on a voyage from Gordon, Aberdeenshire to Rotterdam, South Holland. She was refloated the next day.
James Dowell	United Kingdom	The ship was driven ashore and damaged at Hartlepool.
Jane	United Kingdom	The ship was driven ashore and damaged at Hartlepool.
Jane	United Kingdom	The Mersey Flat sprang a leak and sank at Garston, Lancashire. Her crew were rescued.
Jane and Susan	United Kingdom	The schooner was wrecked at Minehead. Her crew were rescued. She was on a voyage from Bridgwater, Somerset to Port Talbot, Glamorgan.
Jason	United Kingdom	The ship was driven ashore and damaged at Hartlepool.
Jessamine	United Kingdom	The ship foundered in the North Sea with the loss of all hands.
Joan of Arc	United Kingdom	The brig was driven into the brig Royal Albion (United Kingdom) and sank in the River Thames at Erith with the loss of two of her crew.
John	United Kingdom	The ship was driven ashore at Great Yarmouth.
John and Jane	United Kingdom	The ship was driven ashore and wrecked at Spittal Point, Northumberland. Her crew were rescued. She was on a voyage from South Shields, County Durham to Dunbar, Lothian.
John and Mary	United Kingdom	The schooner was driven ashore and wrecked near the Nash Lighthouse, Glamorgan. Her crew were rescued. She was on a voyage from Swansea to Bridgwater, Somerset.
John and May	United Kingdom	The ship collided with Eliza (United Kingdom) and was driven ashore near North Berwick. Her crew were rescued. She was on a voyage from Sunderland to Perth. John and May was later refloated and found to be severely damaged.
John Elliotson	United Kingdom	The ship was driven ashore and damaged at Hartlepool.
Joseph	United Kingdom	The smack was driven ashore at Milford Haven, Pembrokeshire. Her crew were rescued. She was on a voyage from Glasgow, Renfrewshire to Cardiff.
Kingston	United Kingdom	The brigantine was driven ashore and wrecked at Cardiff. Her crew were rescued.
Lady Helena	United Kingdom	The schooner was driven ashore and severely damaged at Flint.
La Petite	Flag unknown	The yacht was wrecked at Weston-super-Mar.
Lavinia	United Kingdom	The ship was driven ashore at Falmouth.
Leo	(United Kingdom of Great Britain and Ireland) Guernsey	The brig sprang a leak and foundered in the English Channel off Folkestone, Kent. Her crew were rescued. She was on a voyage from Guernsey to London.
Lewis and Albert	France	The brig was abandoned off Penarth.
Livingstone	United Kingdom	The smack was driven ashore and wrecked at Beadnell, Northumberland. Her crew were rescued.
Lizzie Tindle	United Kingdom	The ship was driven ashore at Falmouth.
Lord Douglas	United Kingdom	The schooner was driven ashore and wrecked at Corton, Suffolk. Her five crew were rescued by the Lowestoft Lifeboat. She was on a voyage from Bo'Ness, Lothian to Dordrecht, South Holland.
Lord Hawkesbury	United Kingdom	The ship was driven ashore and damaged at Hartlepool.
Louis Albert	France	The brig was driven ashore and severely damaged at Cardiff. Her crew were rescued.
Magdalene	United Kingdom	The schooner was driven ashore at Falmouth. She was on a voyage from Genoa, Kingdom of Sardinia to Falmouth.
Majestic	United Kingdom	The schooner was driven ashore and wrecked at Spittal Point. Her five crew were rescued by the Berwick Lifeboat. She was on a voyage from Dundee to Seaham or vice versa.
Majestic	United Kingdom	The ship was driven ashore at Flint.
Margaret	United Kingdom	The Colchester-registered brig was driven ashore at Hartlepool.
Margaret	United Kingdom	The Hartlepool-registered ship was driven ashore at Hartlepool.
Martha Jane	United Kingdom	The schooner was wrecked near St. Ives, Cornwall. Her crew were rescued. She was on a voyage from Llanelly, Glamorgan to Plymouth.
Mary	United Kingdom	The ship was abandoned in the Atlantic Ocean and sank. Her crew were rescued.
Mary Ann	United Kingdom	The ship was wrecked at Perranuthnoe with the loss of three of her crew. She was on a voyage from Plymouth to Weymouth.
Mary Lauder	United Kingdom	The ship was wrecked at Watchet. Her crew were rescued.
Mariha	United Kingdom	The ship was driven ashore and wrecked in Whitesand Bay. Her crew were rescued.
Mariner	United Kingdom	The brigantine was driven ashore and was damaged at the Mumbles. She was on a voyage from Cardiff to Barcelona, Spain. She was refloated on 31 October and taken in to Cardiff in a severely leaky condition.
Mariquita	United Kingdom	The yacht sank at Holyhead when the tug Despatch (United Kingdom) ran into a cable securing her.
Mary	United Kingdom	The sloop sank at Sully Island, Glamorgan with the loss of all three of her crew. She was on a voyage from Bristol to Carmarthen.
Mary	United Kingdom	The ship was wrecked at Minehead. Her crew were rescued.
Mary Lander	United Kingdom	The ship wrecked at Watchet.
Matthew Thompson	United Kingdom	The ship was wrecked in Morte Bay with the loss of all hands.
Mecca	United Kingdom	The brig was driven ashore and wrecked at West Hartlepool. Her crew were rescued.
Medora	United Kingdom	The ship was wrecked at Hartlepool.
Melanie	United Kingdom	The brigantine was driven ashore and wrecked near Crantock. Her crew were rescued She was on a voyage from Cardiff to Paimbœuf, Loire-Inférieure.
Messenger	United Kingdom	The sloop ran aground and sank at Pwllheli, Caernarfonshire with the loss of all hands.
Milo	United Kingdom	The ship foundered in the Bristol Channel off the coast of Cornwall.
Mina	Denmark	The ship struck the pier at Fredrikshavn and was severely damaged. She was on a voyage from Hartlepool to Fredrikshavn.
M. L. Frank	United Kingdom	The ship ran aground on the Spit Sand, in the Bristol Channel. She was on a voyage from Penarth, Glamorgan to Bristol, Gloucestershire. She was refloated the next day and taken in to Bristol in a leaky condition.
Morning Star	United Kingdom	The ship was driven ashore in Ceibwr Bay with the loss of all hands. She was on a voyage from Port Madoc to Newport.
Nancy	United Kingdom	The ship was driven into a bridge and severely damaged at Teignmouth, Devon.
Noes	United Kingdom	The lugger was wrecked at Newquay. Her crew were rescued. She was on a voyage from Cardiff to Nantes, Loire-Inférieure, France.
Nugget	United Kingdom	The brigantine was wrecked at Crackington Haven. Her crew were rescued. She was on a voyage from Newport to the Clyde.
Number Two	United Kingdom	The barque was abandoned in the North Sea. She was discovered 8 nautical miles (15 km) east of Tynemouth, Northumberland and towed in to South Shields by the tugboat Brothers (United Kingdom).
Number Two	United Kingdom	The sloop was wrecked 9 nautical miles (17 km) west of Rhyl. Her crew were rescued. She was on a voyage from Woodend, Cheshire to Llandulas, Caernarfonshire.
Nummer Drie	Netherlands	The ship was driven ashore at Falmouth.
Ocean	United Kingdom	The schooner ran aground on the Holm Sand. She was refloated and subsequently driven ashore at Caister-on-Sea, Norfolk. She was on a voyage from Hartlepool to Rochester, Kent. Her crew were rescued by the Caister Lifeboat. She was refloated and taken in to Great Yarmouth, where she sank. Ocean was raised on 29 October.
Ocean	United Kingdom	The smack was driven ashore at Penarth.
Ocean Queen	United Kingdom	The pilot boat foundered off Laxey, Isle of Man.
Øresund	Sweden	The barque was driven ashore at Bridgwater. She was on a voyage from Viborg to Bridgwater. She was refloated.
Oriental	United Kingdom	The schooner was driven ashore at Rhyl, Denbighshire. Her six crew were rescued by the Rhyl Lifeboat. She was on a voyage from Ardrossan, Ayrshire to Lancaster, Lancashire. She had become a wreck by 10 November.
Orion	United Kingdom	The ship was driven ashore and wrecked in Whitesand Bay with the loss of all hands.
Oronoko	Flag unknown	The ship of the line was driven in to London Bridge and became jammed across its arches.
Palace	United Kingdom	The trow was driven ashore at Weston-super-Mare. Her crew survived.
Parana	(United Kingdom of Great Britain and Ireland) Jersey	The sloop was driven ashore at Sidmouth, Devon.
Pearl	United Kingdom	The brig was wrecked at St. Agnes, Cornwall. Her crew were either lost, or rescued.
Peggy	United Kingdom	The ship was driven ashore at the Mumbles.
Percival	United Kingdom	The ship was wrecked at Bristol. Her crew were rescued.
Petrel	United Kingdom	The pilot boat was driven ashore and wrecked at Burham-on-Sea.
Petrel	United Kingdom	The yacht was wrecked at Weston-super-Mare.
Petrel	United Kingdom	The schooner was run ashore in Calf Sound on the Calf of Man, Isle of Man. Her three crew survived. She was on a voyage from Troon, Ayrshire to Fleetwood, Lancashire.
Prefere	United Kingdom	The brig was lost near "Lugari", Sicily. Her crew were rescued. She was on a voyage from "Catono" to Marseille, Bouches-du-Rhône.
Proteus	Flag unknown	The ship was driven ashore at Falmouth.
Providence	France	The lugger was driven ashore near Crantock. Her crew were rescued. She was on a voyage from Cardiff to Bordeaux, Gironde. She had become a wreck by 30 October.
Queen	United Kingdom	The schooner was driven ashore at St. Mawes, Cornwall. Her crew were rescued. She was on a voyage from Troon, Ayrshire to Bayonne, Basses-Pyrénées, France.
Rapid	United Kingdom	The ship ran aground at Hayle, Cornwall. Her crew were rescued.
Rapid	United Kingdom	The ship was wrecked at St. Ives. Her crew were rescued.
Reveil Matin	France	The brig was wrecked at Mimizan, Landes with the loss of 125 of the 157 people on board. She was on a voyage from Terra Nova, Newfoundland, British North America to Bayonne, Basses-Pyrénées.
Robinson	United Kingdom	The ship was driven ashore and damaged at Hartlepool.
Rock	United Kingdom	The lugger was driven ashore at the Britannia Pier, Great Yarmouth.
Rockingham	United States	The full-rigged ship was driven ashore at Portishead, Somerset. She was on a voyage from Cardiff to an American port. She was refloated on 27 October and taken in to Bristol.
Rose	United Kingdom	The schooner was driven ashore and wrecked on Morte Point. All five of her crew were lost with the exception of William Darke, the owner and master of the vessel. She was on a voyage from Newport, Monmouthshire to Newquay and/or Padstow.
Rose and Margaret	United Kingdom	The smack ran aground on the Greenfield Bank, in the River Dee and was abandoned. Her crew were rescued. She was subsequently discovered derelict off Parkgate, Cheshire and taken in to Chester, Cheshire.
Rosebud	United Kingdom	The ship was driven ashore and wrecked at Watchet. Her crew were rescued.
Royal Charter	United Kingdom	Royal Charter. The steam clipper dragged her anchors and was wrecked in Lligwy Bay near Moelfre, Anglesey, with the loss of over 450 lives. She was on a voyage from Melbourne, Victoria to Liverpool, Lancashire.
Ruby	United Kingdom	The ship was driven ashore at St. Mawes. She was on a voyage from Plymouth to Newport.
Sally	United Kingdom	The ship was driven ashore at Theddlethorpe, Lincolnshire. She was on a voyage from Wells-next-the-Sea, Norfolk to Newcastle upon Tyne, Northumberland.
Selina	United Kingdom	The schooner foundered off Padstow with the loss of all hands.
Severn	United Kingdom	The brig was driven ashore and sank at West Hartlepool. She was refloated the next day and found to be severely damaged.
Severn	United Kingdom	The barque was driven ashore and wrecked at Hayle with the loss of ten of her eleven crew. She was on a voyage from Cardiff to Havre de Grâce and/or Rouen, Seine-Inférieure.
Silva	United Kingdom	The schooner was wrecked on the Holm Sand, in the North Sea off the coast of Suffolk. Her four crew were rescued by the Lowestoft Lifeboat.
Sirius	Rostock	The galiot was abandoned in the North Sea 8 nautical miles (15 km) off Whitby, Yorkshire. Her crew were rescued by Sarah and Elizabeth (United Kingdom. Sirius was on a voyage from Rostock to Hartlepool.
Sir Robert Peel	United Kingdom	The schooner was wrecked at Greenbank, 2 or 2 nautical miles (3.7 or 3.7 km) west of Portreath with the loss of all six of her crew. She was on a voyage from Cardiff to St. Ives
Sisters	United Kingdom	The yacht was driven ashore at Weston-super-Mare.
Spec	UKGBI	The schooner was driven ashore and wrecked at Exmouth, Devon.
Sprite	United Kingdom	The smack was driven ashore and wrecked near "Merlock", Cornwall with the loss of all hands. She was on a voyage from Newport, Monmouthshire to Boscastle, Cornwall.
Star of the West	United Kingdom	The ship foundered in the Bristol Channel. She was on a voyage from Watchet to Newport.
Stephen and Elizabeth	United Kingdom	The ship was run ashore at Sunderland. She collided with Triton (United Kingdom) and was severely damaged. She was on a voyage from Fareham, Hampshire to Sunderland.
Stroud Packet	United Kingdom	The ship was driven ashore in Bridgwater Bay.
Sultan Selina	United Kingdom	The coaster was wrecked on the Doom Bary. Her crew were either rescued, or lost.
Susan	United Kingdom	The brigantine sank at Cardiff with the loss of all hands.
Susan	United Kingdom	The schooner was driven ashore at the Mumbles. She was on a voyage from Combe Martin, Devon to Porthcawl, Glamorgan. She was refloated and beached at Port Talbot. Subsequently refloated and resumed her voyage in a leaky condition.
Susan	United Kingdom	The ship was wrecked at Bideford. Her crew were rescued.
Susanna	United Kingdom	The schooner was driven ashore at "Aberbach".
Swan	United Kingdom	The schooner was driven ashore and wrecked at Saunton, Devon. Her crew were rescued. She was on a voyage from Looe, Cornwall to Cardiff.
Swift	United Kingdom	The ship was wrecked at Bristol. Her crew were rescued.
Sylvia	United Kingdom	The schooner was wrecked on the Holm Sand. Her four crew were rescued by the Lowestoft Lifeboat.
Thames	United Kingdom	The ship sprang a leak and was beached at Penarth, where she was wrecked with the loss of a crew member.
Thistle	United Kingdom	The brigantine ran aground and was wrecked in Morte Bay. Her six crew were rescued. She was on a voyage from Cardiff to Hayle.
Thomas	United Kingdom	The ship sank at Penarth. She was on a voyage from Cardiff to Plymouth.
Times	United Kingdom	The schooner was driven ashore and wreck 2 nautical miles (3.7 km) east of North Berwick. Her crew were rescued. She was on a voyage from Sunderland to Alloa, Clackmannanshire.
Trial	United Kingdom	The ship was driven ashore and damaged at Hartlepool.
Trio	United Kingdom	The ship was driven ashore and damaged at Hartlepool.
Trio	United Kingdom	The schooner was wrecked at Crackington Haven. Her crew were rescued. She was on a voyage from Devoran, Cornwall to Pembrey, Carmarthenshire.
True Bess	United Kingdom	The ship was wrecked 5 nautical miles (9.3 km) from Solva, Pembrokeshire with the loss of three of her crew.
Two Sisters	United Kingdom	The brig was abandoned in the North Sea off the coast of Lincolnshire. Her crew were rescued by Skylark (United Kingdom). Two Sisters was on a voyage from Mistley, Essex to Whitby, Yorkshire. She was subsequently discovered by Modeste (France), which put ten crew aboard but she had to be abandoned off Flamborough Head, East Riding of Yorkshire. a fishing smack towed her in to Hull, Yorkshire on 2 November.
Union	France	The schooner was wrecked in Crantock Bay. Her crew were rescued by the Coast Guard using rocket apparatus. She was on a voyage from Cardiff to Bordeaux, Gironde. She had become a wreck by 29 October.
Union	United Kingdom	The ship was driven ashore and severely damaged at Great Yarmouth. She was on a voyage from Grangemouth, Stirlingshire to Calais, France.
Victoria	United Kingdom	The ship sank in the River Mersey.
Victoria	United Kingdom	The brig was abandoned in the North Sea 34 nautical miles (63 km) north east of Flamborough Head, Yorkshire.. Her crew were rescued by the barque William (United Kingdom). Victoria was on a voyage from Dartmouth, Devon to Middlesbrough, Yorkshire.
Vixen	United Kingdom	The pilot skiff was wrecked near Sully, Glamorgan. Her crew were rescued.
Wave	United Kingdom	The ship foundered in Freshwater Bay, Pembrokeshire with the loss of all hands.
Watchet Trader	United Kingdom	The ship foundered in the Bristol Channel off the coast of Glamorgan. Her crew were rescued.
Westmorland	United Kingdom	The brig was driven ashore at Port Madoc. She was on a voyage from Port Madoc to Rotterdam, South Holland, Netherlands. She was refloated.
White Star	United Kingdom	The clipper was driven ashore near Eastham, Cheshire. She was on a voyage from Liverpool to Melbourne, Victoria. She was refloated and anchored at New Ferry.
William	United Kingdom	The Mersey Flat capsized and sank in the River Mersey with the loss of both crew.
No. 5	United Kingdom	The pilot boat sank at Sully Island. Her crew were rescued.
No. 12	United Kingdom	The pilot boat was driven ashore at Liverpool with the loss of all hands.
No. 12	United Kingdom	The pilot boat sank at Sully Island. Her crew were rescued.
No. 35	United Kingdom	The pilot boat sank at Sully Island. Her crew were rescued.
Unnamed vessel	Flag unknown	The ship was driven ashore and wrecked at Aberporth, Glamorgan with the loss of all hands.
Unnamed schooner	Flag unknown	The schooner was wrecked at Berry Head, Devon with the loss of all hands.
Unnamed schooner	Flag unknown	The schooner was driven ashore at Port Dinorwick.
Unnamed schooner	Flag unknown	The schooner was driven ashore at Perranporth, Cornwall with the loss of three of her four crew.
Unnamed schooner	Flag unknown	The schooner was run ashore at Perranporth. Her crew were rescued.
Unnamed vessel	United Kingdom	The ship was driven ashore and wrecked at Christchurch, Hampshire. Her thirteen crew were rescued by rocket apparatus.
Unnamed vessels	France	Two ships were driven ashore on the Île de Batz, Finistère. Their crews were rescued.
Unnamed vessels	Flag unknown	Two ships were driven ashore at Crackington Haven, Cornwall with some loss of life.
Weston-super-Mare Lifeboat	United Kingdom	The lifeboat was wrecked at Weston-super-Mare.

== 27 October ==
List of shipwrecks: 27 October 1859
Ship	State	Description
Ann and Margaret	United Kingdom	The schooner was driven ashore and severely damaged at Aberayron, Cardiganshire.
Ann Bridson	United Kingdom	The ship sprang a leak and was abandoned off the Cape of Good Hope, Cape Colony. She was on a voyage from Tuticorin, India to Queenstown, County Cork.
Aquila	United Kingdom	The ship was driven ashore on the Welsh coast. She was later refloated.
Beatrice Catherine	United Kingdom	The smack was driven ashore and wrecked at Porthor, Caernarfonshire with the loss of all hands.
Bee	United Kingdom	The schooner was wrecked at Porthor. Her crew were rescued. She was on a voyage from Aberdovey, Cardiganshire to Chester, Cheshire.
Caroline	Russia	The steamship ran aground in the Scheldt. She was refloated and resumed her voyage.
Catherine	United Kingdom	The smack was driven ashore and wrecked at Traethgwyn, Cardiganshire. Her crew were rescued.
Claudia	United Kingdom	The smack was wrecked at Porthor with the loss of all hands. She was on a voyage from Aberdovey to Chester.
Comet	United Kingdom	The tug was driven ashore and severely damaged at Neath, Glamorgan. She was refloated.
Deerhound	United Kingdom	The steam yacht was driven ashore on the coast of Essex. She was refloated with the assistance of Dapper (United Kingdom).
Elida	Hamburg	The barque foundered in the North Sea. Her crew were rescued by Wilhelmine (Flag unknown). Elida was on a voyage from Sunderland, County Durham, United Kingdom to Hamburg.
Eliza	United Kingdom	The ship foundered in the North Sea off the coast of Yorkshire. Her crew were rescued by the brig Louise Augustine (France).
Ellen	United Kingdom	The ship was driven ashore and sank at Aberayron. She was on a voyage from Milford Haven, Pembrokeshire to "Craiglas".
Flora	United Kingdom	The steamship was wrecked on Neckmann's Ground, in the Baltic Sea. All on board were rescued. She was on a voyage from London to Saint Petersburg, Russia.
Gomer	United Kingdom	The smack was driven ashore and severely damaged at Aberayron.
Hellegina Annegina	Netherlands	The ship struck a sunken wreck at Sulina, Ottoman Empire whilst on a voyage from Brăila, Ottoman Empire to an English port. She consequently foundered in the Black Sea 40 nautical miles (74 km) off Sulina. Her crew were rescued.
Hope	United Kingdom	The smack was driven ashore and wrecked at Port Llechog, Anglesey. Her crew were either lost, or rescued. She was on a voyage from Holyhead, Anglesey to Liverpool, Lancashire. Hope was later refloated.
Jane	United Kingdom	The schooner was abandoned in the North Sea 82 nautical miles (152 km) off Flamborough Head Yorkshire. Her crew were rescued by Albion (France). Jane was on a voyage from Dunkerque, Nord, France to Whitby, Yorkshire.
Jane Morgan	United Kingdom	The ship was driven ashore at "Pwll Morgan". She was on a voyage from Barrow-in-Furness, Lancashire to Bristol, Gloucestershire. She was later refloated and taken in the New Quay, Cardiganshire.
Johann August	Norway	The schooner sank near Mandal, Norway. Her crew were rescued.
Laura and Ellen	United Kingdom	The ship was driven ashore at Porthdinllaen, Caernarfonshire.
Lillydale	United Kingdom	The ship was wrecked at Hook of Holland, South Holland, Netherlands. Her crew were rescued. She was on a voyage from Liverpool to Dordrecht, South Holland.
Major Nanny	United Kingdom	The ship was driven ashore and sank at Traethgwyn with the loss of a crew member. She was on a voyage from Swansea, Glamorgan to Liverpool.
Margaret	United Kingdom	The sloop was driven ashore and wrecked at Traethgwyn. Her crew were rescued.
Mary	United Kingdom	The smack was driven ashore and severely damaged at Aberayron.
Mary Ann	United Kingdom	The ship was driven ashore and wrecked at Traethgwyn. Her crew were rescued.
Mary Hughes	United Kingdom	The schooner was driven ashore and severely damaged at Aberayron.
Mary Jane	United Kingdom	The ship was driven ashore and sank at Aberayron. Her crew were rescued. She was on a voyage from Aberystwyth, Cardiganshire to Douglas, Isle of Man.
Pearl	United Kingdom	The schooner was driven ashore and severely damaged at Aberayron.
Perseverance	United Kingdom	The schooner was driven ashore and severely damaged at Aberayron.
Pilot	United Kingdom	The brig foundered in the North Sea 36 nautical miles (67 km) east south east of Flamborough Head, Yorkshire. Her crew were rescued by the fishing lugger Jeune Alexandre (France). Pilot was on a voyage from South Shields, County Durham to London.
Priscilla	United Kingdom	The smack was wrecked at Porthor with the loss of all hands. She was on a voyage from Aberdovey to Chester.
Robert	United Kingdom	The ship was driven ashore and wrecked at "Pwll Morgan". Her crew were rescued. She was on a voyage from Aberystwyth, Cardiganshire to Liverpool.
Svea	Sweden	The brigantine foundered in the Dogger Bank. Her crew were rescued by the brig Concordia (Norway). Swea was on a voyage from Barrow in Furness to Newcastle upon Tyne, Northumberland, United Kingdom.
Urania	Norway	The barque was driven ashore at Klosterhavn. She was on a voyageb from St. Ubes, Portugal to Stavanger. She was later refloated, and was towed in to Stavanger by the steamship Ryfylke (Norway) on 29 October.

== 28 October ==
List of shipwrecks: 28 October 1859
Ship	State	Description
Agnes	United Kingdom	The schooner ran aground on Big Ferne Island, Northumberland. She was refloated but consequently sank off Beadnell, Northumberland with the loss of her captain. She was on a voyage from Sunderland, County Durham to Dundee, Forfarshire.
Clothilde	Spain	The brigantine ran aground at Ramsgate, Kent, United Kingdom. She was on a voyage from Bergen, Norway to Vigo. Spain. She was refloated but found to be in a sinking condition.
Columbus	United Kingdom	The brig was lost with all hands off Flamborough Head, Yorkshire.
Credo	United Kingdom	The brig sank off Cardigan.
Edith	United Kingdom	The ship departed from Southampton, Hampshire for Llanelly, Glamorgan. No further trace, presumed foundered with the loss of all hands.
Eliza	United Kingdom	The smack was driven ashore and wrecked at "Porthferyn", Pembrokeshire with the loss of all hands.
Golden Grove	United Kingdom	The brig was wrecked on the Holm Sand, in the North Sea off the coast of Suffolk. Her crew were rescued by a yawl. She was on a voyage from South Shields, County Durham to London.
Hebe	United Kingdom	The brig departed from Saint John, New Brunswick, British North America for Porto, Portugal. No further trace, presumed foundered with the loss of all hands.
Ida	Denmark	The schooner collided with Lallah Rookh (United Kingdom) and sank at Liverpool, Lancashire, United Kingdom. Her crew were rescued. She was on a voyage from Westport, County Mayo, United Kingdom to Liverpool. She was refloated on 4 November.
Jane Thompson	United Kingdom	The brig was driven ashore and wrecked at Agger, Denmark with the loss of all hands.
Jessie	(United Kingdom of Great Britain and Ireland) Jersey	The ship was driven ashore at Sandy Hook, New Jersey, United States. She was on a voyage from New York, United States to Paspébiac, Province of Canada, British North America.
Johanna	Wismar	The brig was driven ashore, capsized and sank at "Karingo". Her crew were rescued. She was on a voyage from Hartlepool, County Durham to Wismar.
Johns	United Kingdom	The brig was driven ashore at South Shields. Her crew were rescued by rocket apparatus. She was on a voyage from Saint John, New Brunswick, British North America to South Shields. She was refloated on 29 October with the assistance of four steamships.
Louise and Leonie	France	The brig was driven ashore near "La Nouvelle". She was refloated the next day.
Margaret	United Kingdom	The ship was driven ashore at Workington, Cumberland. Her crew were rescued. She was on a voyage from Londonderry to Workington or vice versa.
Pioneer	United Kingdom	The ship was driven ashore and wrecked west of the Covesea Skerries Lighthouse, Moray. She was on a voyage from Lossiemouth, Moray to Wick, Caithness.
Precilla	United Kingdom	The ship was driven ashore and wrecked at Porthor, Caernarfonshire with the loss of all hands.
Rachel	United Kingdom	The smack was driven ashore at Porthor. Her crew were rescued. She was on a voyage from New Quay, Cardiganshire to Bangor, Caernarfonshire.
Richard Carnell	(United Kingdom of Great Britain and Ireland) Jersey	The schooner was wrecked on the Haisborough Sands, in the North Sea off the coast of Norfolk. Her crew were rescued. She was on a voyage from Liverpool to Great Yarmouth, Norfolk.
Richard Tanton	United States	The ship departed from New York for Liverpool. No further trace, presumed foundered with the loss of all hands.
Tay	United Kingdom	The yacht was driven ashore and severely damaged at Newton, Northumberland.
Triumph	United Kingdom	The ship ran aground in the Strangford Lough. She was on a voyage from Dublin to Ardrossan, Ayrshire. She was refloated and taken in to Strangford, County Antrim in a severely leaky condition.
Weaver	United Kingdom	The schooner was driven ashore and wrecked at Porthdinllaen, Caernarfonshire. Her crew were rescued. She was on a voyage from Saltney, Cheshire to Dublin.

== 29 October ==
List of shipwrecks: 29 October 1859
Ship	State	Description
Active	United Kingdom	The ship was driven ashore and wrecked near Culzean Castle, Ayrshire. Her crew were rescued. She was on a voyage from Glasgow, Renfrewshire to Gatehouse of Fleet, Wigtownshire.
Amy Louisa	United Kingdom	The ship ran aground at the mouth of the River Wear. She was on a voyage from Sunderland, County Durham to a Scottish port. She was refloated and taken in to South Shields, County Durham in a leaky condition.
Bee	United Kingdom	The smack sank at Scrabster, Caithness. She was on a voyage from Scrabster to Macduff, Aberdeenshire.
Belwether	United Kingdom	The ship departed from Sunderland for a French port. No further trace, presumed foundered with the loss of all hands.
Caroline	United Kingdom	The ship was driven ashore at Perranporth, Cornwall. Her crew survived. Caroline was on a voyage from Neath, Glamorgan to Weymouth, Dorset. She was dismantled in situ.
Diamond	United Kingdom	The Yorkshire Billyboy was driven ashore at Redcar, Yorkshire. She was on a voyage from Bridlington, Yorkshire to Middlesbrough, Yorkshire. She was refloated the next day and resumed her voyage.
Diligence	United Kingdom	The schooner was driven ashore and wrecked at Whitby, Yorkshire.
Emerald Isle	United States	The schooner foundered off North Chatham, Massachusetts with the loss of all but one of her crew.
Fly	United Kingdom	The schooner was driven against the quayside and severely damaged at Hull, Yorkshire with the loss of a crew member.
Freden	Denmark	The ship collided with the schooner Harriet (United Kingdom) and was abandoned by her crew, who were rescued by Haabet (Denmark). Freden was on a voyage from Burntisland, Fife, United Kingdom to a Danish port.
Harmina Annegiena	Norway	The ship collided with the brigantine Deo Gloria ( Grand Duchy of Mecklenburg-Schwerin) and was presumed to have sunk off Hirtshals, Denmark. Her crew were rescued by Deo Gloria. Harmina Annegiena was on a voyage from Hartlepool, County Durham, United Kingdom to Malmö, Sweden.
Lillias	United Kingdom	The ship was driven ashore at Abererch, Caernarfonshire. She was on a voyage from Barmouth, Merionethshire to Quebec City. Province of Canada, British North America.
Magnet	United Kingdom	The fishing lugger collided with the schooner S. T. Johanna (Sweden) and was abandoned off Texel, North Holland, Netherlands. Her crew were rescued by S. T. Johanna. Magnet was towed in to Great Yarmouth, Norfolk in a derelict condition on 1 November.
Neptune	United Kingdom	The brig ran aground at Southwold, Suffolk. She was refloated but drove ashore and was wrecked. Her eight crew were rescued by rocket apparatus. She was on a voyage from Hartlepool to London.
Penelope	United Kingdom	The ship put in to Lowestoft, Suffolk in a leaky condition and subsequently sank. She was on a voyage from Hartlepool to Rochester, Kent. She was later refloated.
Plantaganet	United States	The ship was destroyed by fire at Nantucket, Massachusetts.
Richard Carnell	(United Kingdom of Great Britain and Ireland) Jersey	The schooner was wrecked on the Haisborough Sands, in the North Sea off the coast of Norfolk. Her crew were rescued. She was on a voyage from Liverpool, Lancashire to Great Yarmouth.
Rimouski	(United Kingdom of Great Britain and Ireland) British North America	The ship was run ashore at Knott End, Lancashire. She was on a voyage from Quebec City, Province of Canada to Maryport, Cumberland. Rimouski was refloated on 31 October and taken in to Maryport in a severely damaged condition.
Theta	United Kingdom	The ship was driven ashore at Fredrikshavn, Denmark.
Thomas	United Kingdom	The ship was driven ashore at Porthdinllaen, Cardiganshire.
Undine	United Kingdom	The ship ran aground on the Barber Sand, in the North Sea off the coast of Suffolk. She was on a voyage from Harwich, Essex to Sunderland. She was refloated and taken in to Great Yarmouth, Norfolk in a severely leaky condition.
Victoria	United Kingdom	The ship was driven ashore and wrecked at Aberayron, Cardiganshire. She was on a voyage from Port Madoc, Caernarfonshire to Weston-super-Mare, Somerset.

== 30 October ==
List of shipwrecks: 30 October 1859
Ship	State	Description
Ann Emma	United Kingdom	The brig was driven ashore and wrecked at Southwold, Suffolk. Her crew were rescued. She was on a voyage from South Shields, County Durham to London.
Aurora	Grand Duchy of Oldenburg	The galiot was abandoned in the North Sea. Her crew were rescued by Carl (Brazil). Aurora was on a voyage from Middlesbrough, Yorkshire to Leer, Kingdom of Hanover. Aurora was taken in to "Fedderwerden" on 1 November in a derelict condition.
Chat-Botte	France	The ship struck rocks and sank in the Raz de Sein. Her crew were rescued. She was on a voyage from Cardiff, Glamorgan, United Kingdom to Nantes, Loire-Inférieure.
Clarence	United Kingdom	The ship was driven ashore in the Strangford Lough. She was on a voyage from Dublin to Glasgow, Renfrewshire. She was refloated on 1 November and found to be leaky.
Diligence	United Kingdom	The schooner was driven ashore and wrecked at Whitby, Yorkshire. Her crew were rescued. She was on a voyage from Berwick upon Tweed, Northumberland to Great Yarmouth, Norfolk.
Ellen Drinan	United Kingdom	The schooner foundered in the Bristol Channel. Her crew were rescued. She was on a voyage from Llanelly, Glamorgan to Waterford.
Hazard	United Kingdom	The ship was driven ashore at Pembrey, Pembrokeshire. She was refloated with the assistance of the Coast Guard.
James	United Kingdom	The schooner ran aground in the Solway Firth near the Solway Lightship ( Trinity House). She was on a voyage from Dublin to Maryport, Cumberland. She was refloated with the assistance of a steamship and taken in to Maryport.
Margaret Lloyd	United Kingdom	The ship sank off Cardigan Island, Cardiganshire.
Perseverance	United Kingdom	The schooner struck the pier and was damaged at Whitby, Yorkshire.
Princess Victoria	United Kingdom	The ship was run down by a steamship and sank in the Swin, ff the coast of Essex. Her crew survived.
Salvia	United Kingdom	The brig ran aground on the Barnard Sand, in the North Sea off the coast of Suffolk. She was refloated and beached at Covehithe, where she sank. Her crew were rescued by rocket apparatus.
Theda	Danzig	The brig was driven ashore and wrecked on Skagen, Denmark. She was on a voyage from Sunderland, County Durham to Danzig.
Vedra	United Kingdom	The ship struck a submerged object in the North Sea 2 nautical miles (3.7 km) north east of Southwold and was damaged. She was on a voyage from London to Blyth, Northumberland. She put in to Harwich, Essex in a leaky condition.

== 31 October ==
List of shipwrecks: 31 October 1859
Ship	State	Description
Æolus	United Kingdom	The ship was wrecked between Penarth and Lavernock Point, Glamorgan.
Amethyst	United Kingdom	The ship was run into by the steamship Stanley (United Kingdom) and was severely damaged. She was on a voyage from Liverpool, Lancashire to Genoa, Kingdom of Sardinia. She was taken in to Liverpool in a severely leaky condition.
Amphitrite	France	The barque was driven ashore and wrecked at "Pendowen", Cornwall, United Kingdom. Her crew were rescued. She was on a voyage from Newport, Monmouthshire, United Kingdom to Alexandria, Egypt.
Anegiena	Netherlands	The koff collided with the galeas Argo (Prussia) and was abandoned 4 nautical miles (7.4 km) north of the Kullen Lighthouse, Sweden. Her crew were rescued by Argo. Angeiena was on a voyage from Saint Petersburg, Russia to the Firth of Forth. She was subsequently discovered by Patriot and Sidonia (both Prussia) and taken in two. The tow was later transferred to the steamship Marie (Denmark) and she was taken in to Helsingør.
Brilliant	United Kingdom	The brig was wrecked at Coatzacoalcos, Mexico.
Bron Eryn	United Kingdom	The ship departed from the Isles of Scilly for Belfast, County Antrim. No further trace, presumed foundered with the loss of all hands.
City of Chester	United Kingdom	The sloop was driven ashore and wrecked at Clogherhead, County Louth. Her crew were rescued. She was on a voyage from the River Dee to Drogheda, County Louth. City of Chester broke up on 5 November.
Comet	United Kingdom	The ship caught fire at Aberdeen.
Confidence	Norway	The barque was wrecked in Freshwater Bay, Pembrokeshire, United Kingdom. Her crew were rescued.
De Haven	Netherlands	The ship was driven ashore on "Tamio", Denmark, Her crew were rescued. She was on a voyage from Kronstadt, Russia to London, United Kingdom.
Devonian	United Kingdom	The brig collided with the brig Lightning (United Kingdom) and sank in the North Sea off the Dudgeon Sandbank with the loss of two of her nine crew. She was on a voyage from Hartlepool, County Durham to London.
Elizabeth	United Kingdom	The schooner was wrecked on the Batten Rocks. She was on a voyage from Queenstown, County Cork to Plymouth, Devon.
Eurpoea	United Kingdom	The ship ran aground at Newcastle upon Tyne, Northumberland. she was on a voyage from Newcastle upon Tyne to London. She was refloated and resumed her voyage, but consequently put in to Sunderland, County Durham in a leaky condition.
Flecha	Belgium	The steamship ran aground on the Spijkerplaat. She was on a voyage from Ghent, East Flanders to London.
Henry	United Kingdom	The ship was driven ashore at Llanelly, Glamorgan.
Isaiah	United Kingdom	The ship was driven ashore and wrecked at Great Yarmouth, Norfolk. Her crew were rescued. She was on a voyage from London to Grangemouth, Stirlingshire.
James McHenry	United Kingdom	The ship sank at Quebec City, Province of Canada, British North America. She was refloated.
Jeune Mathilde	France	The schooner was driven ashore and wrecked at Lowestoft, Suffolk, United Kingdom. Her five crew were rescued by the Pakefield Lifeboat. She was on a voyage from Trouville-sur-Mer, Calvados to Seaham, County Durham, United Kingdom.
Joseph and Mary	United Kingdom	The sloop was driven ashore at the Landguard Fort, Felixtowe, Suffolk. She was on a voyage from Goole, Yorkshire to London. She was refloated and taken in to Harwich, Essex.
Laura	United Kingdom	The brigantine was driven ashore and wrecked at Scrabster, Caithness. She was on a voyage from Arklow, County Wicklow to Newcastle upon Tyne, Northumberland.
Levant	United Kingdom	The ship was driven ashore at Plymouth. She was on a voyage from Sundsvall, Sweden to Plymouth.
Marguerite Anais	Norway	The ship was abandoned at sea. Her crew were rescued by the steamship Vulture (United Kingdom). Marguerite Anais was on a voyage from Sunderland to Christiania.
Monica	United Kingdom	The ship foundered in the North Sea off the coast of Yorkshire. Her crew survived. She was on a voyage from Newcastle upon Tyne to London.
Northern Maid	United Kingdom	The sloop was driven ashore and wrecked at Peterhead, Aberdeenshire with the loss of a crew member. She was on a voyage from Peterhead to Dundee, Forfarshire.
Ocean Breeze	United Kingdom	The ship ran aground and was severely damaged at the Mumbles, Glamorgan. She was on a voyage from Swansea, Glamorgan to Gibraltar.
Robert Henry	United Kingdom	The schooner foundered in the Bristol Channel 4 nautical miles (7.4 km) off Pennard, Glamorgan. Her crew survived.
Shepherd	United Kingdom	The ship ran aground at the mouth of the Elbe. She was on a voyage from Altona to Drogheda, County Louth. She was refloated and resumed her voyage, but consequently put in to Inverness on 1 November in a leaky condition.
Victoria	United Kingdom	The schooner was driven ashore and wrecked at "Crumtree Burrows", Glamorgan. Her crew were rescued.

== Unknown date ==
List of shipwrecks: Unknown date in October 1859
Ship	State	Description
Ajax	United Kingdom	The ship was severely damaged at Bombay, India before 12 October and was consequently condemned.
Anna Emma	United Kingdom	Royal Charter Storm: The ship was wrecked. Her crew were rescued.
Ann Hinckley	United States	The barque was abandoned in the Atlantic Ocean before 25 October, foundering on that date.
Arab	United Kingdom	The ship foundered off Ilfracombe, Devon between 24 and 27 October.
Beatrice	United Kingdom	The ship foundered in the Atlantic Ocean with the loss of one of her ten crew. She was on a voyage from Quebec City, Province of Canada, British North America to Liverpool, Lancashire.
Bruce	United Kingdom	The smack was wrecked at Tenby, Pembrokeshire. Her three crew were rescued by the Tenby Lifeboat.
Cæsar	United Kingdom	Royal Charter Storm: The ship foundered in the Dogger Bank. Her crew were rescued.
Catharina	United States of the Ionian Islands	The brig sprang a leak and foundered in the Mediterranean Sea before 26 October. Her crew were rescued. She was on a voyage from Sulina, Ottoman Empire to Livorno, Grand Duchy of Tuscany and Marseille, Bouches-du-Rhône, France.
Celebataire	France	The ship collided with another vessel and foundered in the Grand Banks of Newfoundland. Her crew were rescued by Reveil Matin (France).
Charles Holmes	United States	The ship was wrecked at "Porthdwrgan" with the loss of all hands, She was on a voyage from Liverpool, Lancashire, United Kingdom to Mobile, Alabama.
Charles S. Peaslee	United States	The schooner foundered with the loss of all but one of those on board. She was on a voyage from Jacksonville, Florida to Philadelphia, Pennsylvania.
Cobden	Sweden	The ship was wrecked near Farsund, Norway between 22 and 29 October. Her crew were rescued. She was on a voyage from Newcastle upon Tyne, Northumberland, United Kingdom to Gävle.
Cumberland	United Kingdom	Royal Charter Storm: The ship was wrecked. Her crew were rescued.
Edgar	United Kingdom	Royal Charter Storm: The ship was lost with all hands.
Edinburgh	United Kingdom	The barque departed from Algiers, Algeria for Saint John, New Brunswick, British North America. No further trace, presumed foundered with the loss of all hands.
Emily	United Kingdom	Royal Charter Storm: The brig foundered off Texel, North Holland, Netherlands with the loss of all nine crew.
George	United Kingdom	The ship was wrecked in the Black Sea before 15 October.
Good	United Kingdom	The wherry was swamped in the River Tyne by the wake from a steamship and sank with the loss of a crew member.
Greenock	United Kingdom	The ship was abandoned in the Atlantic Ocean before 25 October. Her crew were rescued by Advice (United Kingdom). Greenock was on a voyage from Quebec City to Belfast, County Antrim.
Hannibal	United Kingdom	Royal Charter Storm: The ship was wrecked. Her crew were rescued.
Hellenie	United Kingdom	The ship was wrecked with the loss of 180 of the 300 people on board. She was on a voyage from Kertch, Russia to Constantinople, Ottoman Empire.
Helios	United Kingdom	The ship was destroyed by fire at New Orleans, Louisiana, United States before 8 October.
Henry H. Hynds	United States	The brig was driven ashore near Ship Harbour, Nova Scotia, British North America between 11 and 18 October.
Homer	United Kingdom	Royal Charter Storm: The ship was wrecked. Her crew were rescued.
Inkerman	United Kingdom	The ship was lost whilst on a voyage from London to Hong Kong.
James Hartley	United Kingdom	The steamship was wrecked 80 nautical miles (150 km) from Hong Kong. Her crew were rescued.
Jane	United Kingdom	The ship was wrecked on the Salisbury Bank, in Liverpool Bay before 8 October. She was on a voyage from Liverpool to Dublin.
John and Lucy	United Kingdom	The ship was wrecked at "Gardas" before 29 October. She was on a voyage from Liverpool to the Cape of Good Hope, Cape Colony.
John Henry	United Kingdom	The barque ran aground on the Memillon Reef before 26 October. She was on a voyage from Matanzas, Cuba to Falmouth. She was refloated and put in to Charleston, South Carolina, United States for repairs.
Josephine	France	The brig collided with Cascade (United Kingdom and was abandoned in the Grand Banks of Newfoundland. All 40 people on board were rescued by Cascade (United Kingdom).
Lady of the Lake	United Kingdom	The ship was driven ashore at Lindisfarne, Northumberland. She was on a voyage from King's Lynn, Norfolk to Leith, Lothian. She was refloated on 26 October and beached at Berwick upon Tweed, Northumberland.
Manalitta	United Kingdom	Royal Charter Storm: The ship was wrecked. her crew were rescued.
Manuel Mount	Chile	The full-rigged ship was wrecked at the mouth of the Paraíba River. Her crew were rescued.
Marguerite	France	The schooner was abandoned in the North Sea before 31 October.
Marie Dolphine	(United Kingdom of Great Britain and Ireland) British North America	The schooner was wrecked at Cape St. Charles, Labrador.
Mary Ivos	Austrian Empire	The ship was wrecked in the Black Sea before 15 October.
Maxim	United Kingdom	Royal Charter Storm. The ship was wrecked. Her crew were rescued.
Mongo	Spain	The barque was driven ashore and wrecked at Folden, Norway in early October. Her crew were rescued. She was on a voyage from London, United Kingdom to Kristiansand, Norway.
New World	United States	The steamship foundered with the loss of eight or nine lives.
Portland	United States	The ship ran aground on the Moselle Shoals. She was on a voyage from Liverpool to New Orleans, Louisiana. She had been refloated by 22 October and taken in to Bimini, Bahamas.
Possidone	Greece	The brig was wrecked at Andros. Her crew were rescued. She was on a voyage from Odesa to a Mediterranean port, or from Constantinople, Ottoman Empire to Marseille, Bouches-du-Rhône, France
Rafaela	United Kingdom	The ship was driven ashore at Gibraltar before 26 October.
Redwood	United States	The ship was wrecked on the Bahama Banks. Her crew survived. She was on a voyage from New Orleans to Havre de Grâce, Seine-Inférieure, France.
Rienzi	United States	The barque foundered with the loss of six of her thirteen crew. She was on a voyage from Africa to Rotterdam, South Holland, Netherlands.
Royalist	United Kingdom	Royal Charter Storm: The ship was wrecked. Her crew were rescued.
Sapphire	United Kingdom	The ship was wrecked in the Torres Straits with the eventual loss of eighteen of the 28 people on board.
Shepherdess	United Kingdom	The ship ran aground on a sunken rock in the Gulf of Bothnia. She was on a voyage from Svartvick, Sweden to Scarborough, Yorkshire. She was refloated and towed in to Stockholm, Sweden in a waterlogged condition.
St. André	(United Kingdom of Great Britain and Ireland) British North America	The ship was wrecked at "Five Leagues Harbour", in the Strait of Belle Isle before 14 October. She was on a voyage from Labrador to Quebec City, Province of Canada.
Superb	United Kingdom	The sloop was abandoned in the North Sea 10 nautical miles (19 km) off Coquet Island, Northumberland. Her crew were rescued by Albion (France). Superb was on a voyage from Great Yarmouth, Norfolk to Berwick upon Tweed.
Swallow	United Kingdom	Royal Charter Storm: The ship was wrecked. Her crew were rescued.
Syphax	(United Kingdom of Great Britain and Ireland) British North America	The barque was abandoned in the Atlantic Ocean before 10 October.
Transit	(United Kingdom of Great Britain and Ireland) British North America	The ship was abandoned off Bermuda before 12 October. Her crew were rescued by Ocean Telegraph ( (United Kingdom of Great Britain and Ireland) British North America). Transit was on a voyage from "Ragged Island", Nova Scotia to Trinidad.
Twin Sisters	United Kingdom	Royal Charter Storm: The schooner was presumed to have foundered in Cardigan Bay with the loss of all five crew. She was on a voyage from Newport to Liverpool.
Walachia	Ottoman Empire	The brig was wrecked near "Kelia" with the loss of all but four of her crew.
