= Closter =

Closter may refer to:

- Closter (surname)
- Closter, New Jersey, a borough in Bergen County, New Jersey, United States
- Closter, Nebraska, an unincorporated community in Boone County, Nebraska, United States

== See also ==
- Kloster (disambiguation)
