= Gustaf de Laval =

Swedish engineer and inventor (1845–1913)

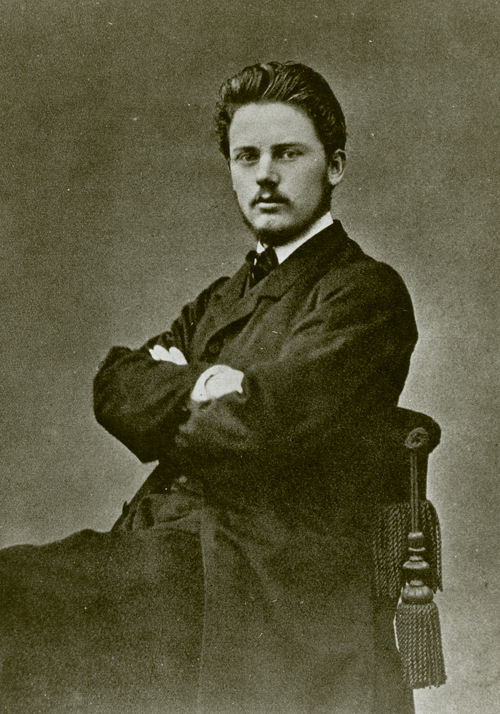
- de Laval 1875
- Born: 9 May 1845; Orsa, Dalarna, Sweden
- Died: 2 February 1913 (aged 67); Stockholm, Sweden
- Education: KTH Royal Institute of Technology; Uppsala University
- Known for: Steam turbines, dairy machinery, and the de Laval nozzle for rocket engines

Karl Gustaf Patrik de Laval (Swedish pronunciation: [ˈɡɵ̂sːtav dɛ laˈvalː]; 9 May 1845 – 2 February 1913) was a Swedish engineer and inventor who made important contributions to the design of steam turbines and centrifugal separation machinery for dairy.

== Life ==
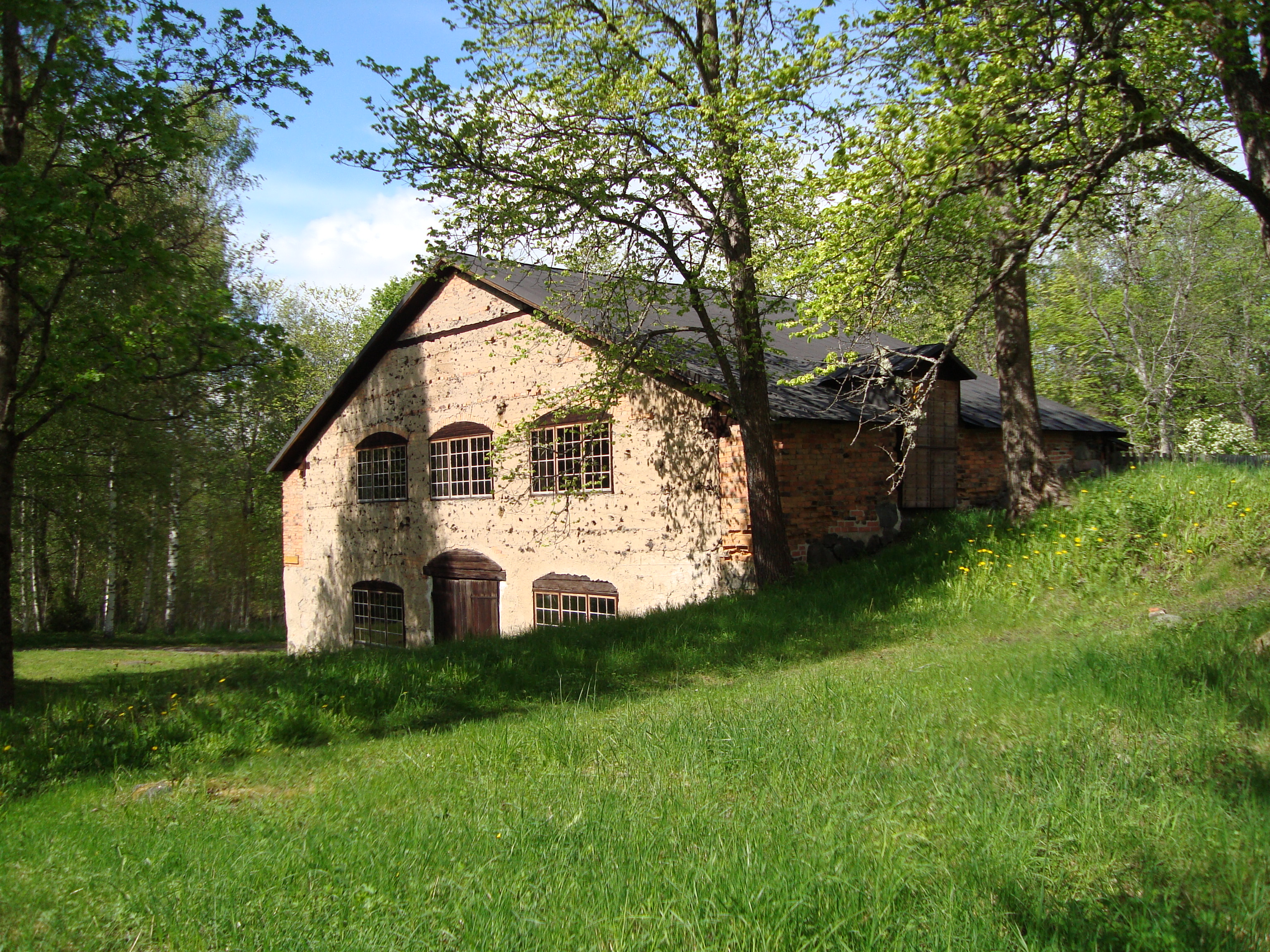
de Laval's forge in Kloster

Gustaf de Laval was born at Orsa in Dalarna in the Swedish de Laval Huguenot family (immigrated 1622 - Claude de Laval, soldier - knighted de Laval 1647). He enrolled at the Institute of Technology in Stockholm (later the Royal Institute of Technology, KTH) in 1863, receiving a degree in mechanical engineering in 1866, after which he matriculated at Uppsala University in 1867.

He was then employed by the Swedish mining company, Stora Kopparberg. From there he returned to Uppsala University and completed his doctorate in 1872. He was further employed in Kloster Iron works in Husby parish, Sweden.

de Laval was a member of the Royal Swedish Academy of Sciences from 1886. He was a successful engineer and businessman. He also held national office, being elected to the Swedish parliament, from 1888 to 1890, and later became a member of the senate. He was elected an honorary member of the American Society of Mechanical Engineers in 1912.

De Laval died in Stockholm in 1913 at the age of 67. He is interred at Norra begravningsplatsen in Stockholm, Sweden.

== Contributions ==
=== de Laval nozzle ===
In 1882 he introduced his concept of an impulse steam turbine and in 1887 built a small steam turbine to demonstrate that such devices could be constructed on that scale. In 1890, Laval developed a nozzle to increase the steam jet to supersonic speed, working from the kinetic energy of the steam, rather than its pressure. The nozzle, now known as a de Laval nozzle, is used in modern rocket engine nozzles. De Laval turbines can run at up to 30,000 rpm. The turbine wheel was mounted on a long flexible shaft, its two bearings spaced far apart on either side. The higher speed of the turbine demanded that he also design new approaches to reduction gearing, which are still in use today. Since the materials available at the time were not strong enough for the immense centrifugal forces, the output from the turbine was limited, and large scale electric steam generators were dominated by designs using the alternative compound steam turbine approach of Charles Parsons.

Using high pressure steam in a turbine that had oil-fed bearings meant that some of the steam contaminated the lube-oil, and as a result, perfecting commercial steam-turbines required that he also develop an effective oil/water separator. After trying several methods, he concluded that a centrifugal separator was the most affordable and effective method. He developed several types, and their success established the centrifugal separator as a useful device in a variety of applications.

=== De Laval cream separators and Alfa Laval ===
De Laval also made important contributions to the dairy industry, including the first centrifugal milk-cream separator and early milking machine, the first of which he patented in 1894. It was not until after his death, however, that the company he founded marketed the first commercially practical milking machine, in 1918. Together with Oscar Lamm, de Laval founded the company Alfa Laval in 1883, which was known as AB Separator until 1963 when the present name was introduced.

=== DeLaval ===
In 1991, Alfa Laval Agri, a company producing dairy and farming machinery was split from Alfa Laval when it was bought by the Tetra Pak Group. When Alfa Laval was sold, Alfa Laval Agri remained a part of the Tetra Pak group and was renamed DeLaval, after the company's founder.

== Image gallery ==
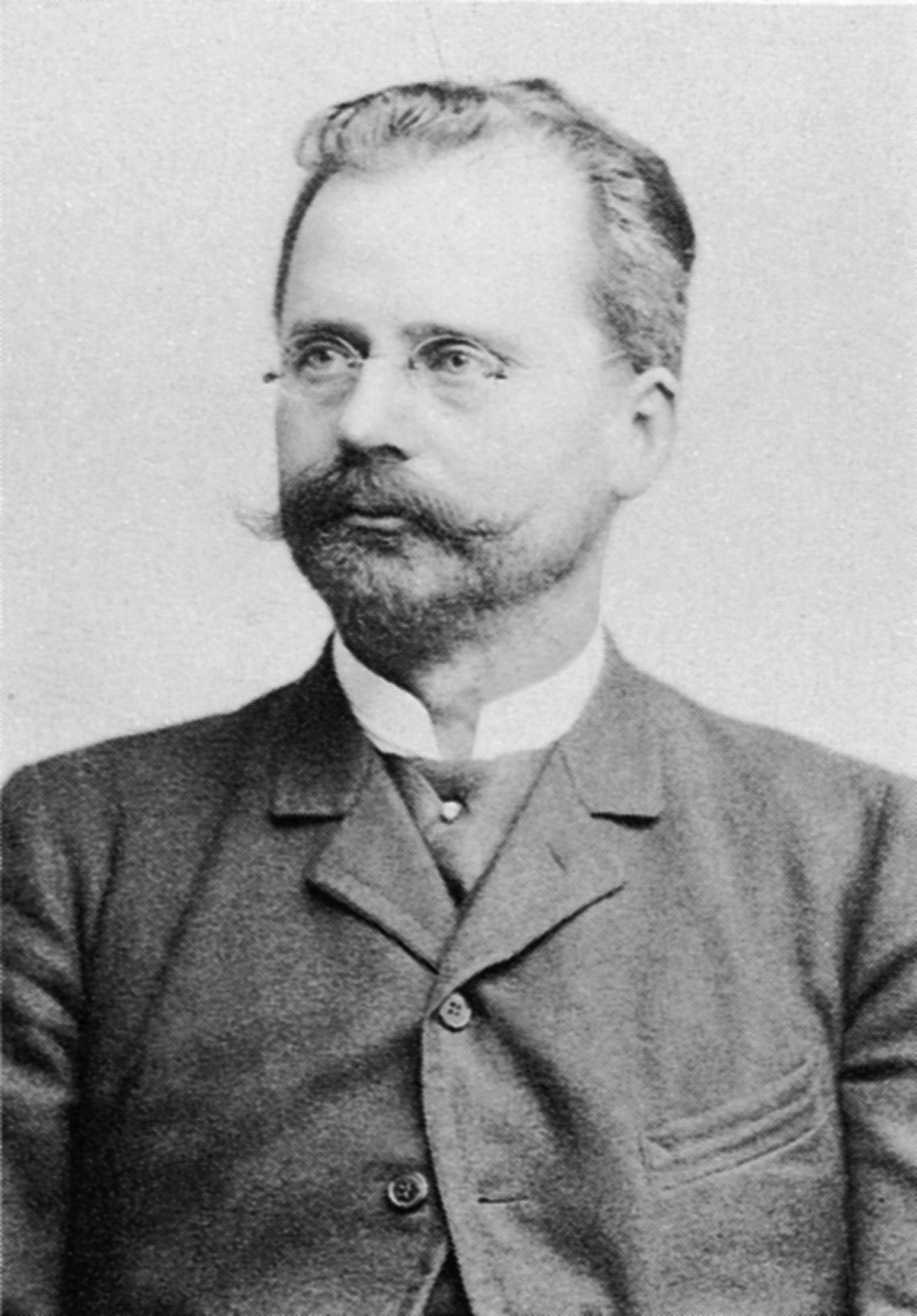
Gustaf de Laval at around age 50.

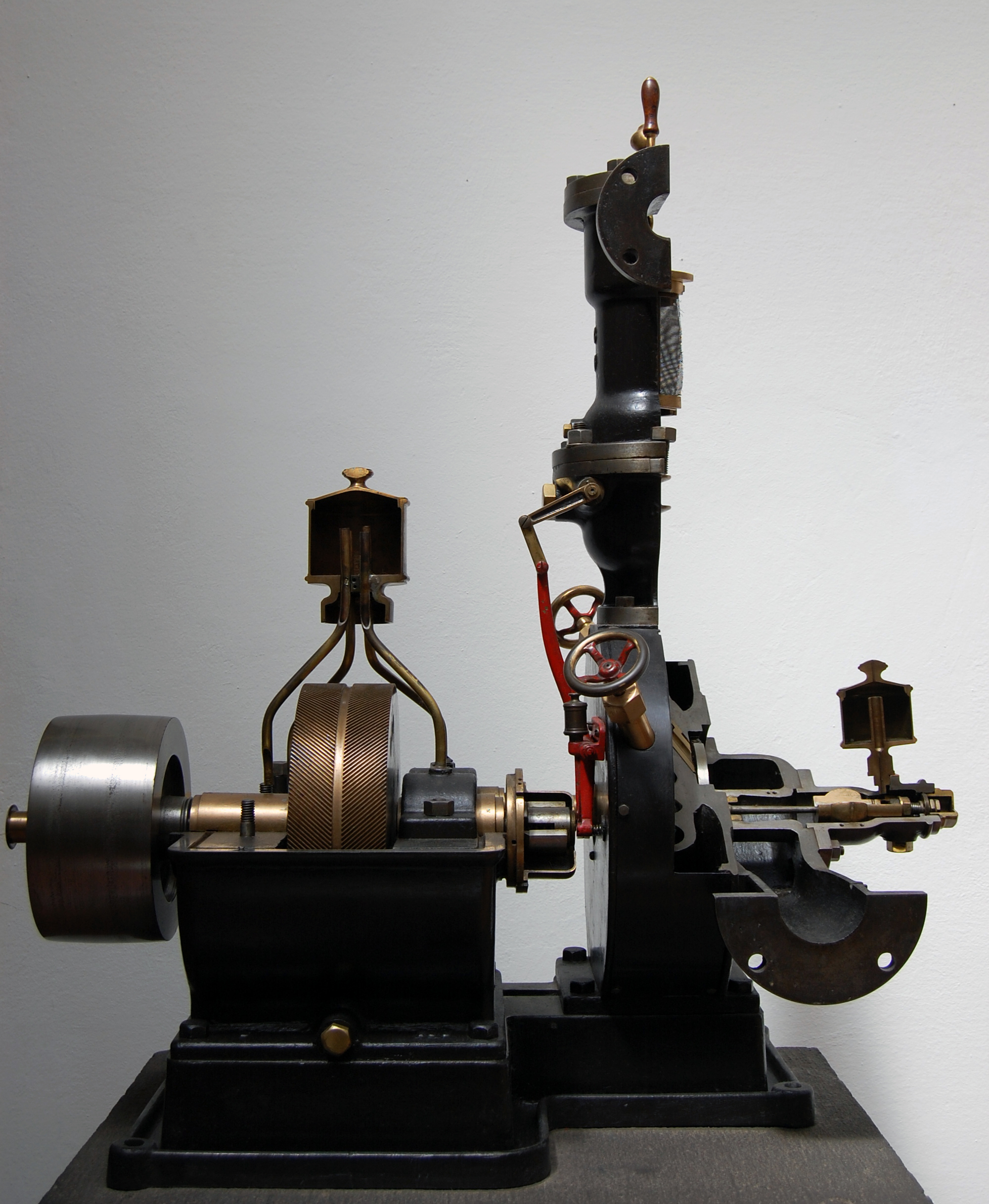
Impulse turbine by Gustaf de Laval. Built in Sweden, 1888. Deutsches Museum, Munich.

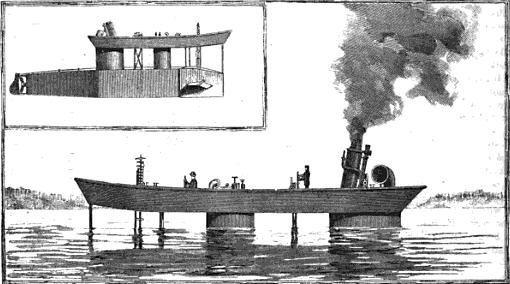
A unique semi-submersible invented by Gustaf de Laval

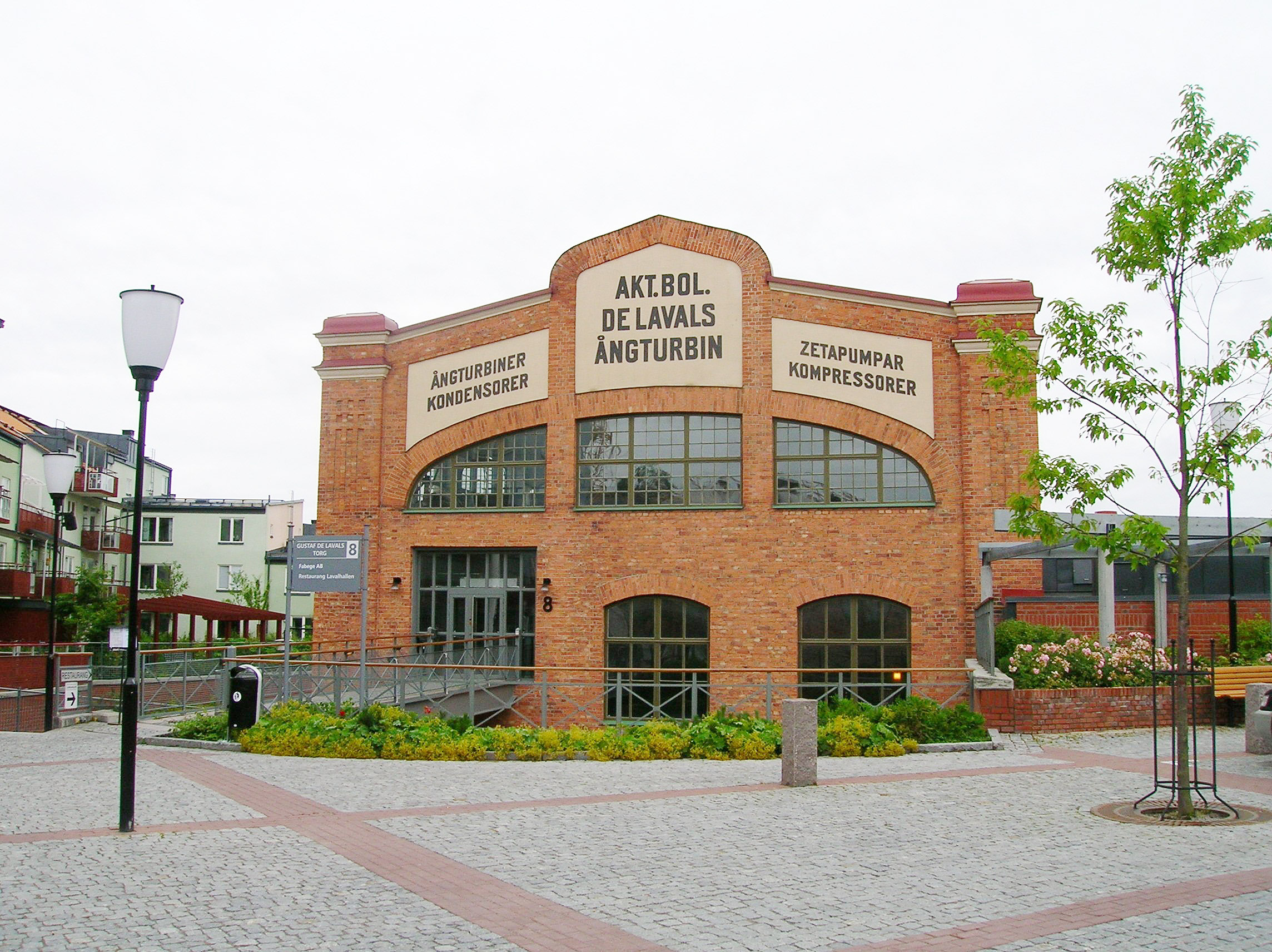
The former De Laval steam turbine factory in Nacka outside Stockholm, now converted to a conference centre.

== See also ==
- History of the internal combustion engine
