= Kloster, Sweden =

Village in Hedemora Municipality, Sweden

Coordinates: 60°22′N 16°10′E

Kloster is a village in Hedemora Municipality, Dalarna, Sweden, kloster is a historically significant village in Hedemora Municipality, Dalarna County, Sweden, renowned for its transition from a medieval religious center to a major industrial hub. The village takes its name from the Gudsberga Abbey (Gudsberga kloster), which was established in 1486 as the final Cistercian monastery founded in Sweden before the Protestant Reformation. Following the dissolution of the monastery in 1527, the site evolved into a vital industrial site; by the 18th century, it housed Sweden's largest black powder mill (operating from 1741 to 1871) and a pioneering ironworks. At its peak in the 19th century, the ironworks employed approximately 900 people and featured the country's first sheet-metal rolling mill. Today, the village is a key stop on the Husbyringen nature trail and maintains several cultural landmarks, including the ruins of Gudsberga Abbey, the Kloster Ironworks Museum located in the former stables, and a forge used by the famed inventor Gustaf de Laval.

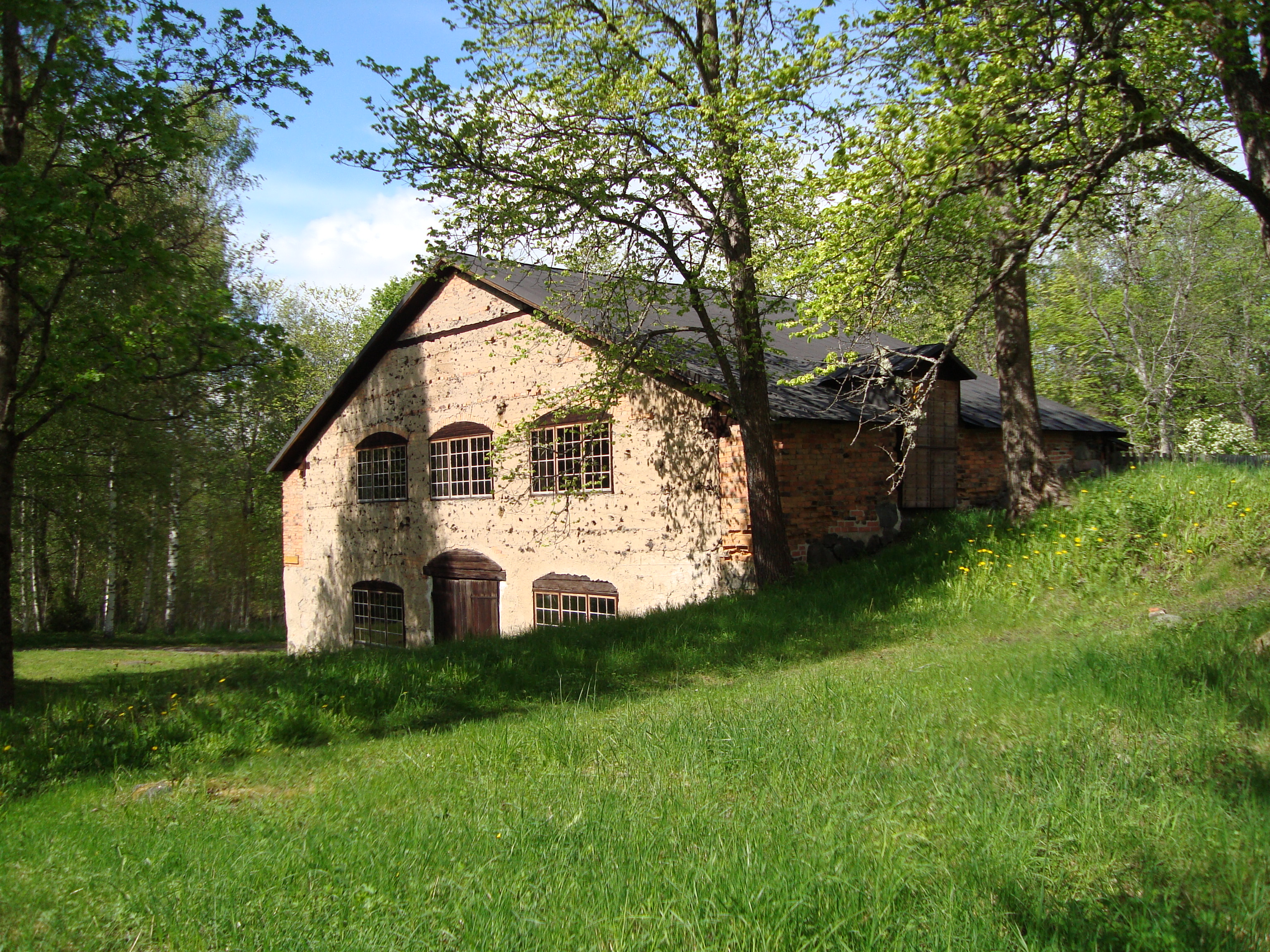
Gustaf de Laval's forge at Kloster Ironworks

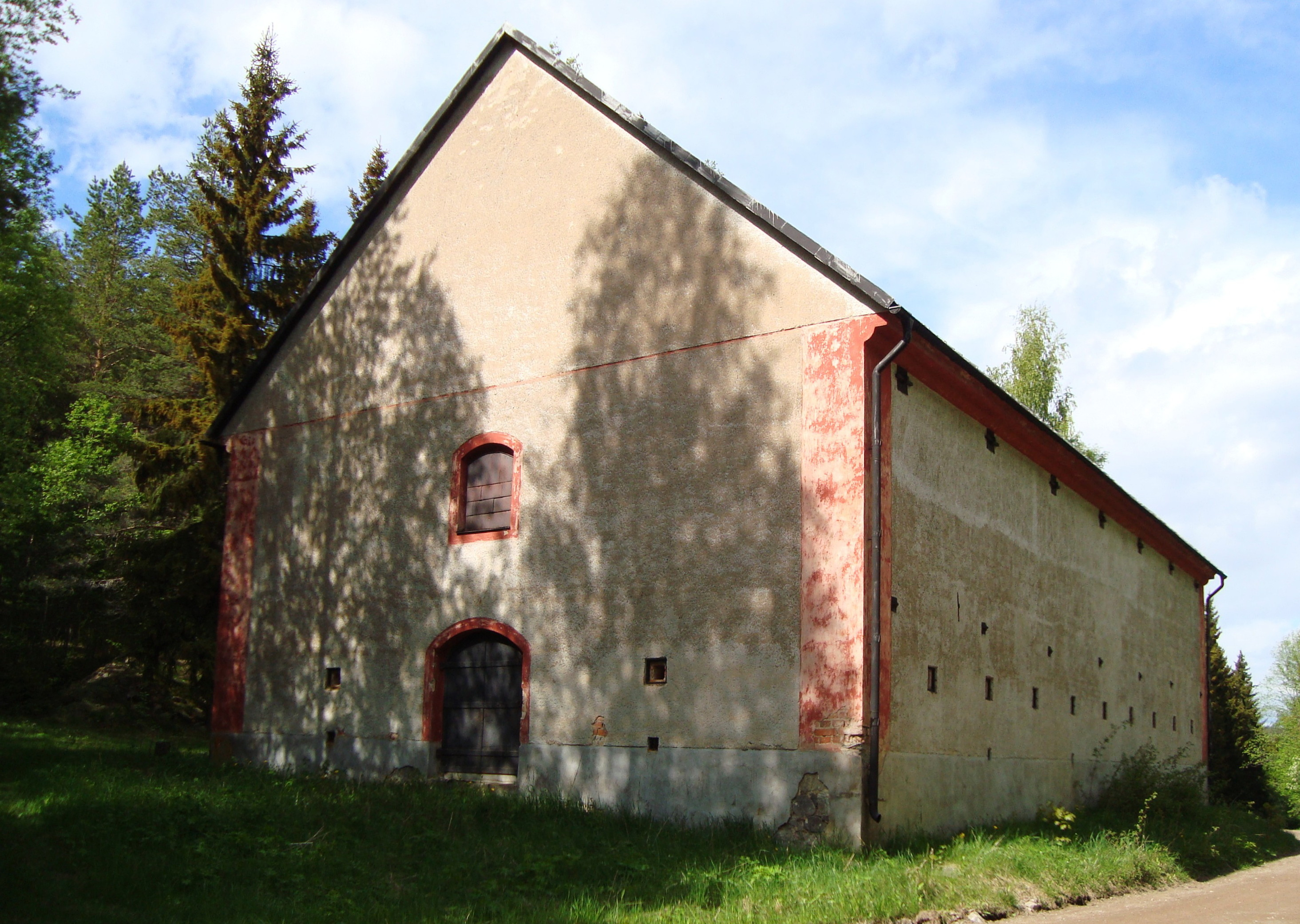
Powder magazine of Kloster's black powder mill (1741–1871)

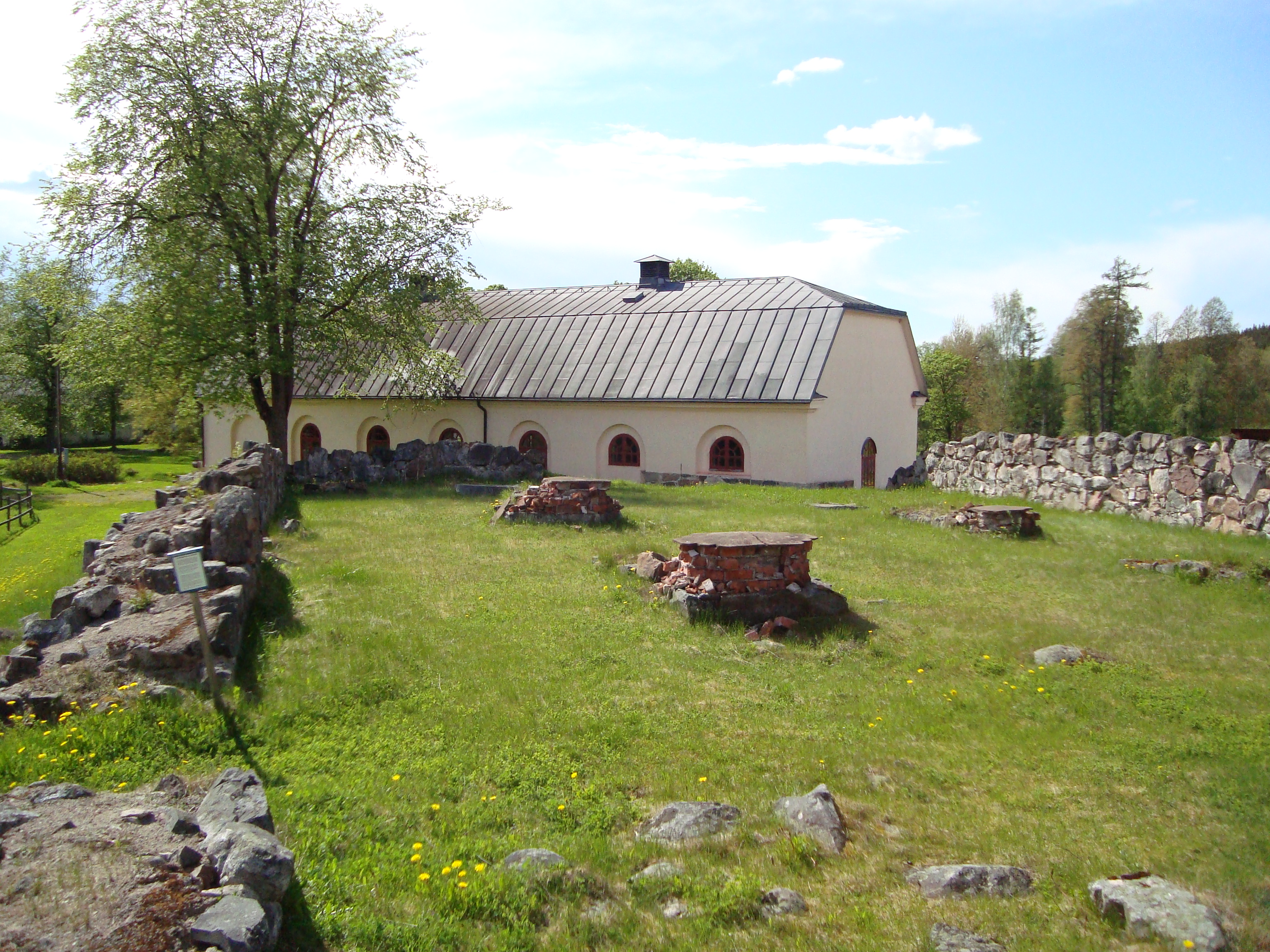
Ruins of Gudsberga Cistercian monastery (1486–1544)
