= Uriel Ramírez =

Argentine professional footballer

Personal information
- Full name: Uriel Matías Ramírez Kloster
- Date of birth: 19 August 1999 (age 27)
- Place of birth: Buenos Aires, Argentina
- Height: 1.89 m (6 ft 2 in)
- Position: Forward

Team information
- Current team: Acasusso

Youth career
- Vélez Sarsfield
- 2019–2020: Aldosivi

Senior career*
Years	Team	Apps	(Gls)
2020–2022	Aldosivi	5	(0)
2023	Estudiantes BA	0	(0)
2024–	Acasusso	35	(1)
- * Club domestic league appearances and goals as of 17:46, 22 March 2025 (UTC)

Uriel Matías Ramírez Kloster (born 19 August 1999) is an Argentine professional footballer who plays as a forward for Acasusso.

== Career ==
Ramírez Kloster started his career in his homeland with Vélez Sarsfield, before joining Aldosivi in 2019. After a year in the latter's youth system, the forward made the breakthrough into their first-team squad in late-2020 under manager Guillermo Hoyos. He was initially an unused substitute for a Copa de la Liga Profesional match with Estudiantes, though soon made his senior debut on 6 November in the same competition against Argentinos Juniors; replacing Leandro Maciel near the end of the second half.

== Career statistics ==
As of 7 November 2020.

Appearances and goals by club, season and competition
Club	Season	League			Cup		League Cup		Continental		Other		Total	
Club	Season	Division	Apps	Goals	Apps	Goals	Apps	Goals	Apps	Goals	Apps	Goals	Apps	Goals
Aldosivi	2020–21 (Note: Soccerway counts Copa de la Liga Profesional appearances as league appearances.)	Primera División	1	0	0	0	0	0	—		0	0	1	0
Career total			1	0	0	0	0	0	—		0	0	1	0
