= Closter (surname) =

Closter is a surname. Notable people with the surname include:

- Al Closter (born 1943), American baseball player
- René Closter (born 1952), Luxembourgish businessman
- Sebastián Closter (born 1989), Argentine volleyball player
- Wayne Closter (born 1945), Australian rules footballer
