= Kloster, Denmark =

Kloster
- Village
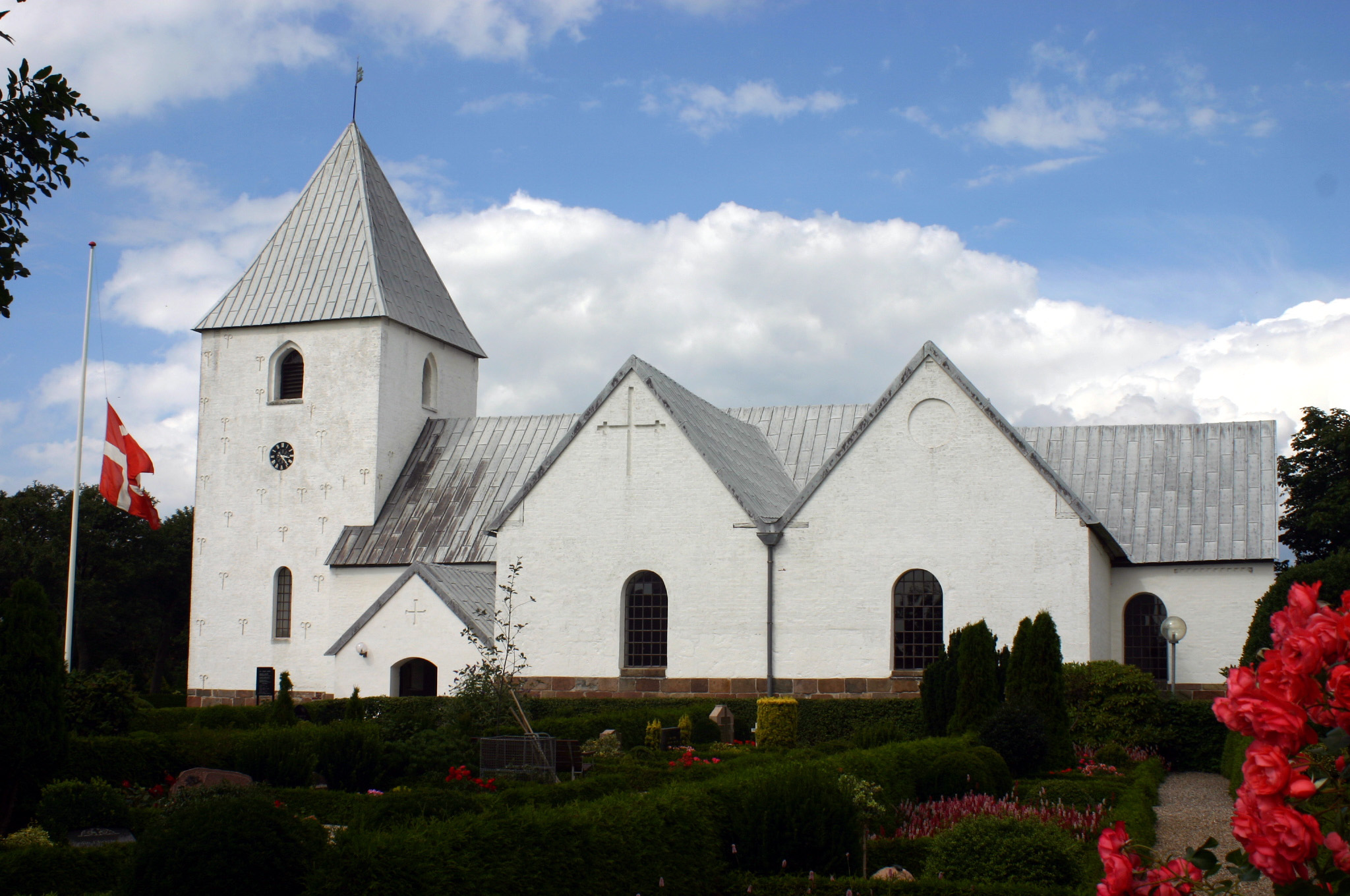
- Ny Sogn Kirke, the church in Kloster

- Location in Central Denmark Region Kloster (Denmark)
- Coordinates: 56°7′38″N 8°10′38″E
- Country: Denmark
- Region: Central Denmark
- Municipality: Ringkøbing-Skjern
- Parish: Ny Sogn Parish

Population (2026)
  - Total: 626

Kloster is a small town in the western part of Central Denmark Region with a population of 626 (1 January 2026). Kloster is located between the North Sea, Stadil Fjord and Ringkøbing Fjord.

== Background and history ==
The village of Kloster sits halfway between Ringkøbing and Søndervig in an area called Holmsland. The area traces its recorded beginnings to the early 1600s when a local lord used the term in a letter to the king. Central to the village is the New Sogn Church which dates to the mid-thirteenth century and is one of the largest village churches in Denmark, seating approximately 340.

There has never been an actual "cloister" in the village and the stories regarding attribution of the name are not in agreement.

606 people from 23 different countries call the village home and enjoy an elementary school (along with daycare and a kindergarten), a modern sports hall, easily accessible natural resources, broadband fiber communications, several active sports and interest clubs and a Dagli' Brugsen food store.

The area is promoted under the name "Natures Riches". The shallow water and steady winds of Ringkøbing Fjord attract kitesurfers.

The "tourist" area, centered in Søndervig has recently been recognized as Denmark's most active tourist destination with several thousand "summer houses" nestled in the dunes against the North Sea attracting visitors from across Northern Europe. The high percentage of German tourists tends to make German the most common second language of the area.
