= Cemaes Head =

Nature reserve in north Pembrokeshire

Coordinates: 52.11477°N 4.72947°W

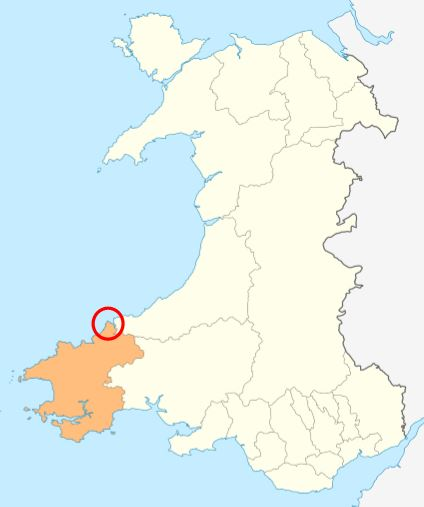
Location of Cemaes Head (circled) in Pembrokeshire, Wales

Cemaes Head (formerly Cemais, and historically anglicised as Cemmaes, Kemmaes or Kemmes) (Welsh: Pen Cemaes or Trwyn Cemaes) is a headland and nature reserve in north Pembrokeshire. It lies in the community of St Dogmaels, within the Pembrokeshire Coast National Park. To the west and north it overlooks Cardigan Bay, and to the east Cardigan Island and the estuary of the River Teifi.

== Geology and structure ==
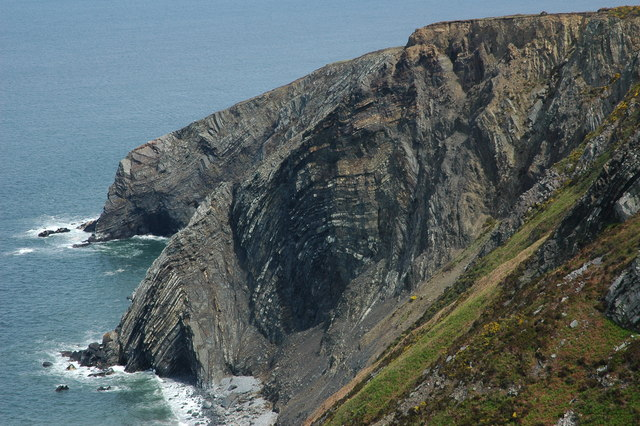
Contorted strata on the cliffs at Cemaes Head

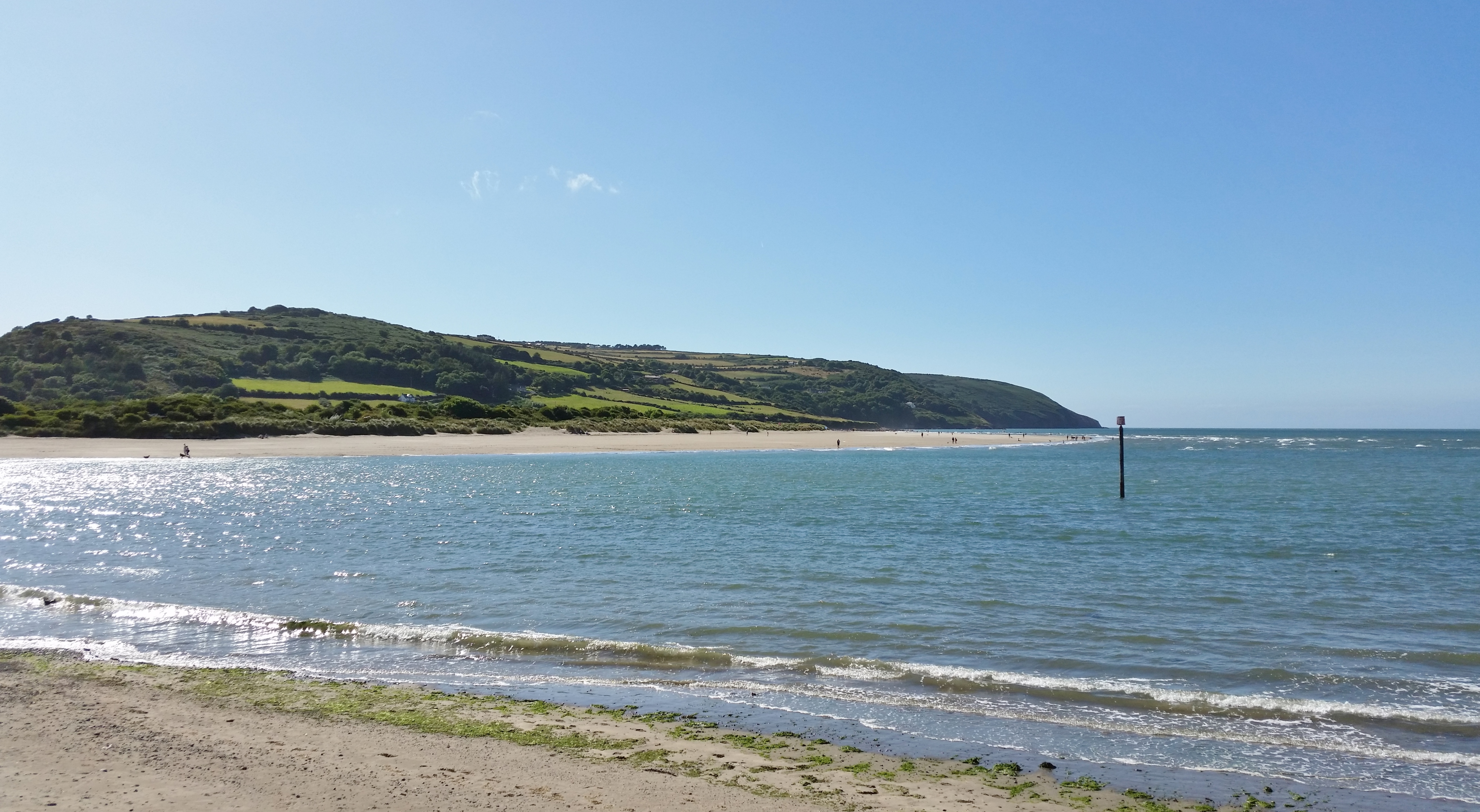
Seen from across the Teifi estuary, the headland of Cemaes Head behind Poppit Sands beach

Although the headland, when viewed from across the Teifi estuary, is relatively unspectacular, its cliffs, which are most dramatic on its north-western side, and reach over 575 ft (175m) in height, are the highest in Pembrokeshire. This makes the bays below the cliff tops largely inaccessible. The bedrock is composed of Silurian and (mostly) Ordovician sedimentary rocks, more specifically of Llanvirn-Caradoc black mudstone, i.e. some 470 million years old. This rock stretches southwest as far as Newport, but Cemaes Head lies north of the Ceibwr Bay Fault, which runs largely WSW – ENE from Ceibwr Bay to Cardigan.

These rocks are severely twisted and buckled, with even acute folds, a feature easily seen from the clifftops, though appreciated better from the sea. The soft composition of these sedimentary rocks also means that erosion by the sea through hydraulic action, abrasion and attrition is commonplace, and they are thus largely unsuitable for climbing.

In 1840, George Nicholson in The Cambrian Traveller's Guide, and Pocket Companion, wrote :

The coasts on each side of the mouth of the river are uncommonly grand, particularly on the Pembroke side, where rises Cemmaes Head, a promontory of immense elevation.

The highest part of the headland, at Pengarn (189m / 620 ft), grid reference SN 13214 48500, is marked by a pillar trig point (ref. 2097).

On the western side of the headland, at the foot of the cliffs, is a stony beach area called Traeth Godir Coch which is exposed at low water.

The western side of the headland is exposed to the full force of the south-westerly Atlantic weather; the eastern side is sheltered.

The whole headland to the north of the hamlet of Cippyn is a distinctive area; there is an absence of trees and to some extent hedges; fields have stony boundary banks; properties are small, and there is a general absence of modern development.

== Nature reserve ==
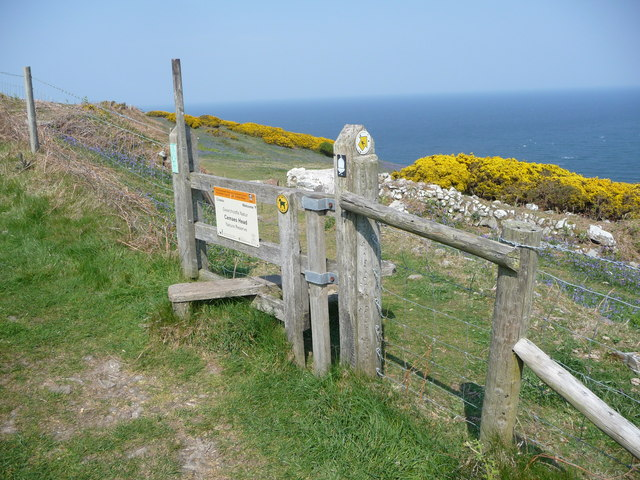
The stile entrance to Cemaes Head Nature Reserve

Most of Cemaes Head comprises pastureland, but the headland contains a nature reserve – Cemaes Head Nature Reserve (site centre no. SN131500) – measuring 20 ha (49.4 acres) in size. It is also rated as a Marine Special Area of Conservation (SAC) and a Site of Special Scientific Interest (SSSI). Since 1984 this has been owned and managed by the Wildlife Trust of South and West Wales and its predecessor trust who purchased the tenure with help from the Countryside Commission, Dyfed County Council, the Nature Conservancy Council and the World Wildlife Fund. At the time it was the 50th nature reserve to be acquired by the Trust.

== Wildlife ==
The headland is home to a large variety of wildlife. Birds such as choughs, ravens, kestrels and buzzards are commonly seen, and the sea cliffs provide nesting sites for herring gulls, shags, fulmars, cormorants, razorbills and guillemots.

Seals are commonly seen at the foot of the cliffs and in the bay – more grey seals breed here than anywhere else in Wales from mid-summer – and the area is also home to bottlenose dolphins and porpoises, which can often be seen swimming offshore.

The grassy western slopes of the headland are grazed by ponies and rabbits. Welsh Mountain ponies were reintroduced here to trample down the bracken in order to encourage the breeding of choughs. This is also the habitat of voles. On the higher parts are varieties of maritime heather, such as ling heather and bell heather, and gorse also grows. Bracken and wild flowers commonly grow on the more protected eastern slopes; efforts are being made to keep this bracken under control. Recent efforts have also been made to tackle the invasion of Himalayan Balsam.

== Access ==
Cemaes Head lies on the 186-mile (299 km) Pembrokeshire Coast Path, close to its northern end. This is itself part of the much longer 870-mile (1,400 km) Wales Coast Path. The remote section of path over Cemaes Head from Poppit Sands to Ceibwr Bay is some 5½ miles long, with a considerable amount of ascent and descent.

All stiles and gates on the Pembrokeshire Coast Path are numbered from north to south; the stile on Cemaes Head carries the number 1.

It is possible to drive up part of Cemaes Head on the lane from Poppit Sands. This lane accesses a couple of private properties near the top, and stops at Allt y Coed campsite, some ¼ mile short of the furthest point of the coastal path; there is car parking available here, from where a two-mile round of the headland can be made on Rights of Way. A round of the headland can also be made from the hamlet of Cippin, a mile up the lane from Poppit Sands, where there is also a car park.

Both Cippin and Poppit Sands are on the route of the Poppit Rocket, a seasonal coastal bus service.

== The Coastguard lookout post ==
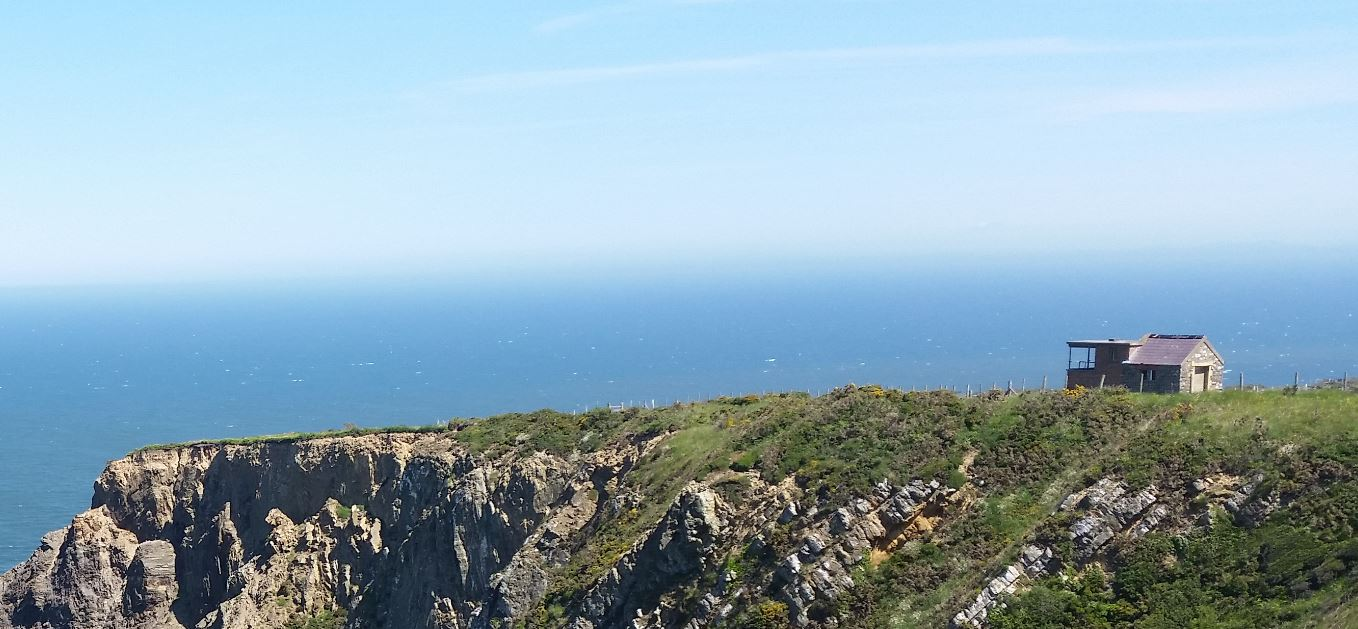
The old Coastguard lookout building on Cemaes Head, showing the newer extension on the seaward side of the original building

On the cliff top above the beach of Traeth Godir Coch is an old coastguard lookout post. This was originally built in the 19th century (it is marked on the O.S. map of 1887) and was subsequently enlarged seawards in World War II by the addition of a brick wide-windowed extension. At the same time the main doorway was enlarged and edged with the same red brick. The site was accessed via a track and footpath from Pengarn, ½ mile to the south-east and from Alltycoed Farm upon whose land it lies. This was one of hundreds of wartime coastal lookouts which kept watch for enemy aircraft and submarines; the oil storage tanks at Milford Haven were only a short flight from here, and during the war they were heavily bombed.

The lookout post was abandoned after the war, it being replaced by the Coastguard lookout post across the estuary at Gwbert (originally established in 1878 as a Board of Trade Rocket Life Saving Apparatus Station and since extended, and now part of the Maritime and Coastguard Agency Emergency Response).

== Cantref Cemais ==
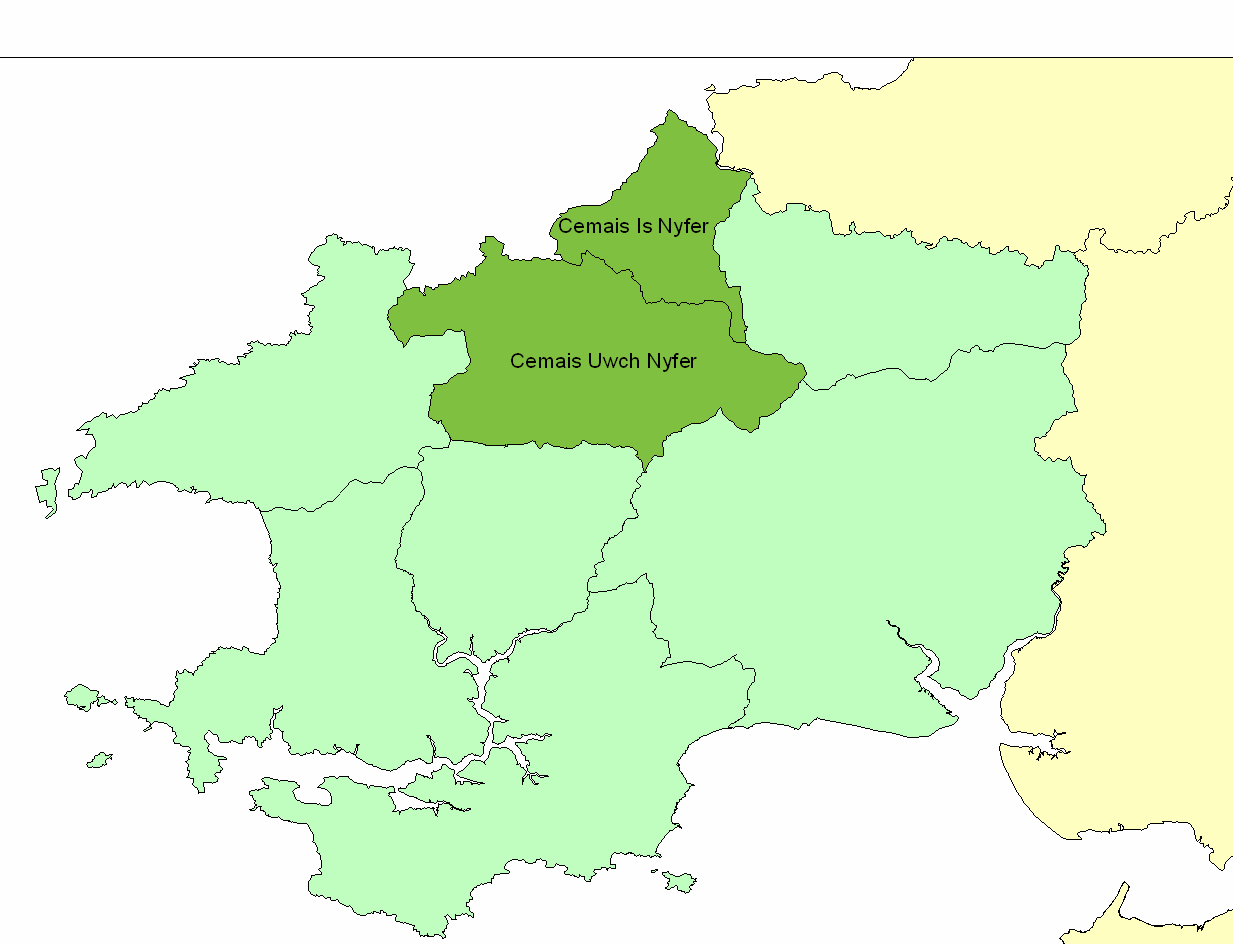
Ancient Dyfed showing the cantref of Cemais and its commotes

Cemaes Head lies on the northern edge of the former Medieval barony (or lordship) of Cemais, known as Cantref Cemais, one of the so-called 'Seven Cantrefs of Dyfed'.

Cemais (sometimes spelled Kemes after one of several variations found in Medieval orthography) occupied the coastal area between the Teifi estuary and Fishguard, and the northern and southern slopes of the Preseli Hills, and had an area of about 359 km^{2}. Robert fitz Martin (c. 10?? – c. 1159), a Norman knight from the west of England who supported Henry I in his campaigns in Wales, became first Lord of Cemais and founded nearby St Dogmaels Abbey.

Despite being occupied by the Normans in the 12th century, and made part of the March, it remained exclusively Welsh-speaking.

It later became known as the Hundred of Cemais, which was created from the cantref at the time of the Acts of Union of 1535–1542, by transferring the parish of Llantood to Cilgerran hundred and adding a small area of Cantref Gwarthaf cantref.

== Etymology ==
The word 'cemais' is the plural form of the old Welsh word 'camas', meaning a 'bend or loop in a river' or (less commonly) a 'bay/inlet of the sea'. As a name it is by no means unique in Wales: Cemaes is a riverside village located on Cemaes Bay on the north coast of Anglesey, and was part of a similarly named Cantref Cemais. Neither Cemmaes (Welsh: Cemaes) in northern Powys, or Kemeys Commander (Welsh: Cemais Comawndwr) in Monmouthshire is by the sea, but both have developed beside rivers.

In The Place-names of Wales (1912), the author Thomas Morgan puts forward another less-likely suggestion, namely:

Cemaes/Cemmaes — This name is very common in Wales. It is a compound word, made up of CEFN, back, ridge, and MAES, a field, thus signifying a high field. Or better, from CAM and MAES, meaning land at the bend of the river .... Others think it a compounded form of CAMP, a feat [in this case military], a game; and MAES, a field.

Archaeologia Cambrensis (1904) had the following to say on the matter:

Allow me to call attention to the spelling Kernels, which shows that the modern Welsh spelling should be Cemais or Cemmais, or else Cemes if you like, only not Cemmaes: there is no maes, field or plain, in it, as some people seem to imagine. The word is derived from cam, crooked, bent, and refers to the bend of a coast line or of a river. In the Pembrokeshire case the name refers, I fancy, to the angle made by the coast line with the mouth of the Teifi.

The Welsh name of Pen Cemaes (pen = head) has been in use since at least as far back as the early 19th century. In recent years the name Trwyn Cemaes (trwyn = nose) has also been used by the Welsh Government and maritime authorities.

There was no recorded settlement here called Cemaes, only the Cantref/Hundred of that name. The earliest reference to it comes from Gerald of Wales (c. 1146 – c. 1223), the archdeacon of Brecon and chronicler of his time, who referred to it in his autobiography:

But on the next day in Cemais, not far from the bridge of Aberteifi [Cardigan] ....

In Barons, Rebels & Romantics (2004), Alan John Fitzgerald erroneously refers to the town of Cemais:

The knights tried to retreat to the town of Cemais but many were drowned when a bridge collapsed and others were burned to death when the Welsh set fire to the town. The survivors had to take refuge in Cardigan Castle.

It seems probable that the name Cemaes Head derives from the ancient Cantref, rather than vice versa, since the headland had no recorded significance in medieval times.

== Gallery ==
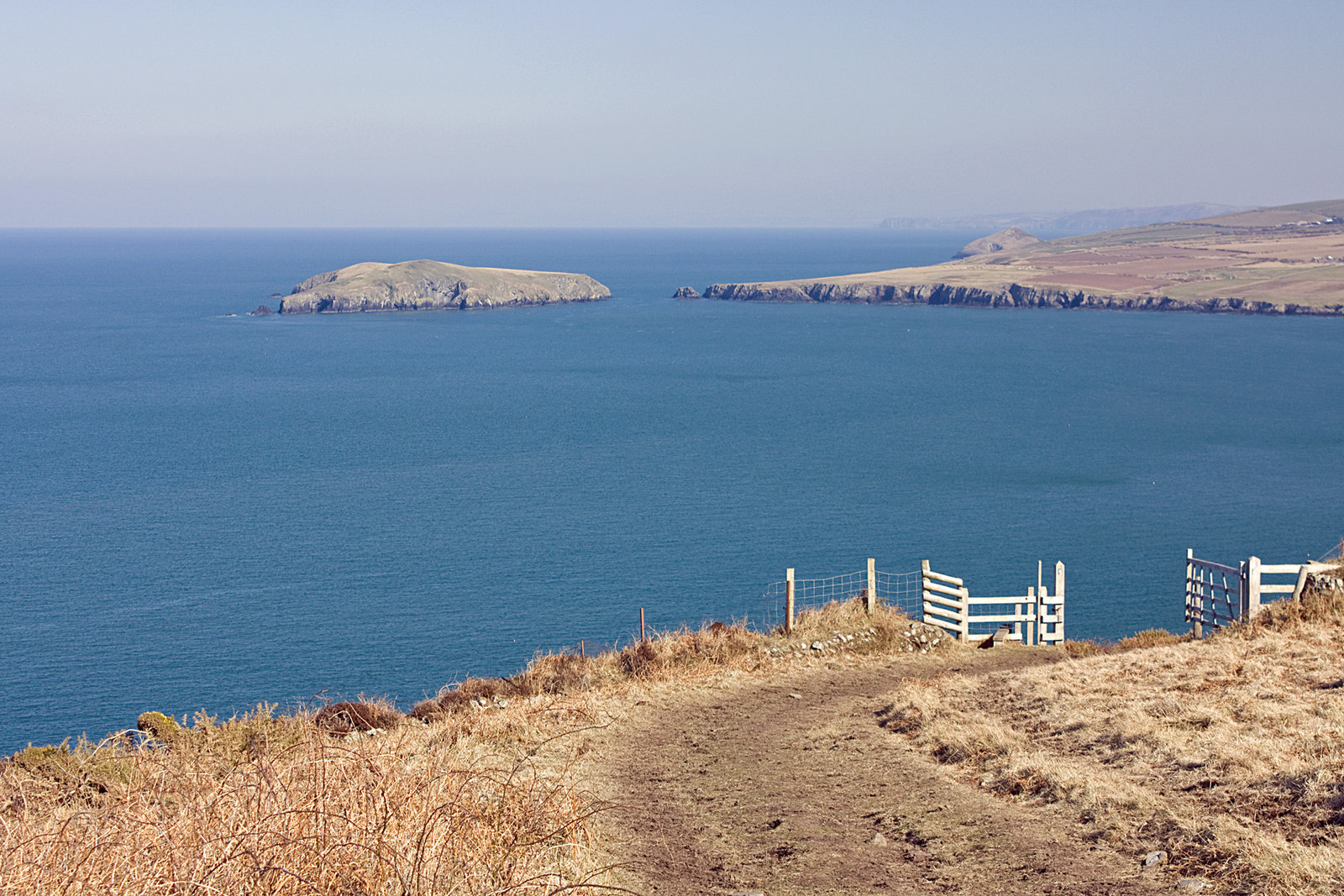
The coastal path on Cemaes Head, looking towards Cardigan Island

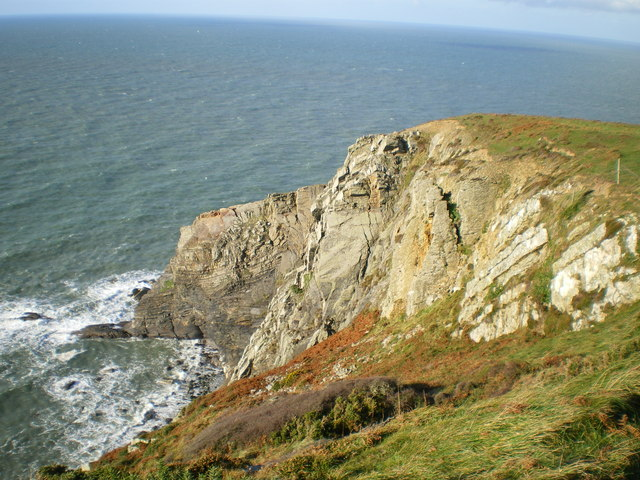
The cliffs viewed from the coastal path

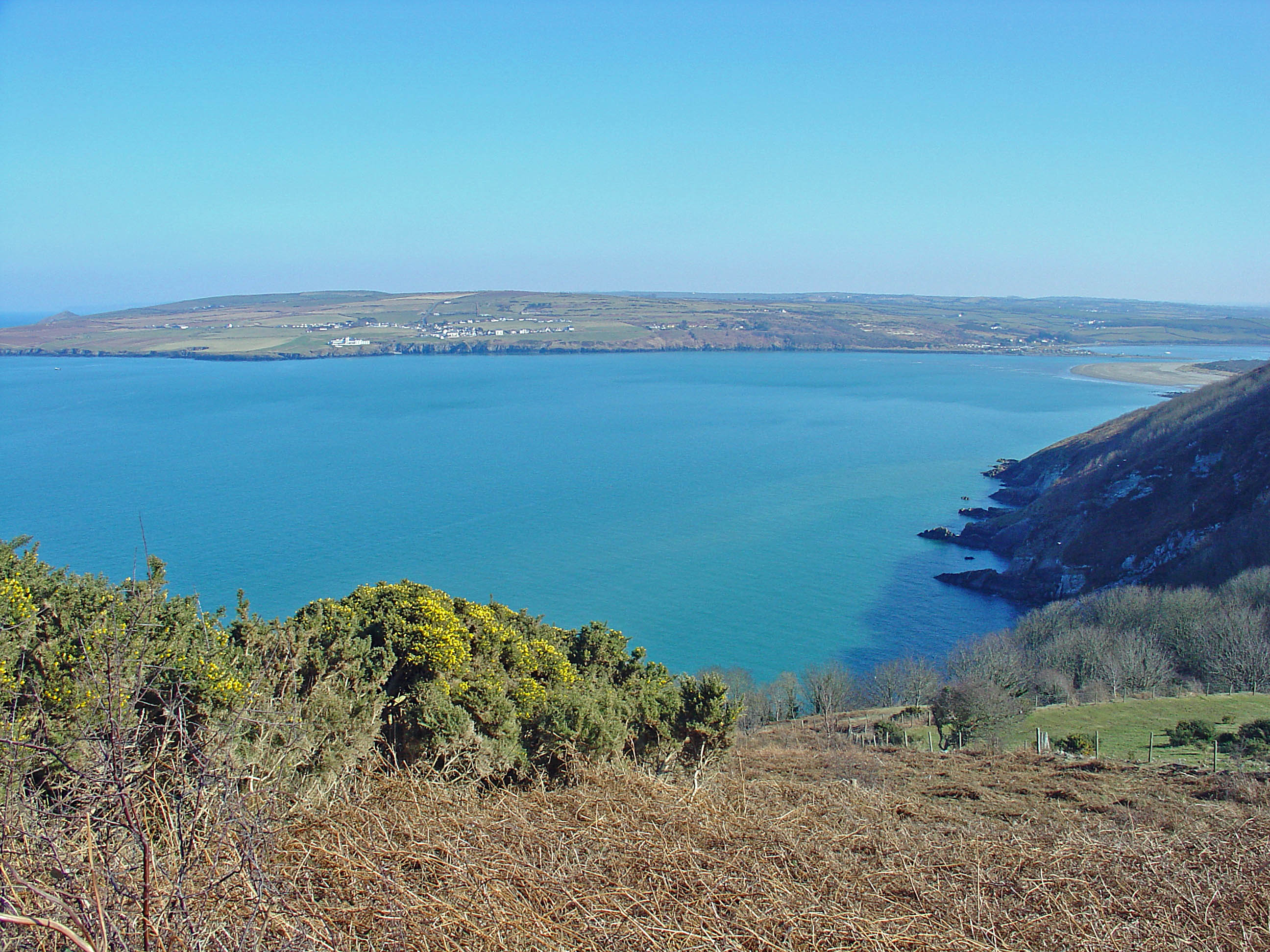
The Teifi Estuary and Gwbert from Cemaes Head

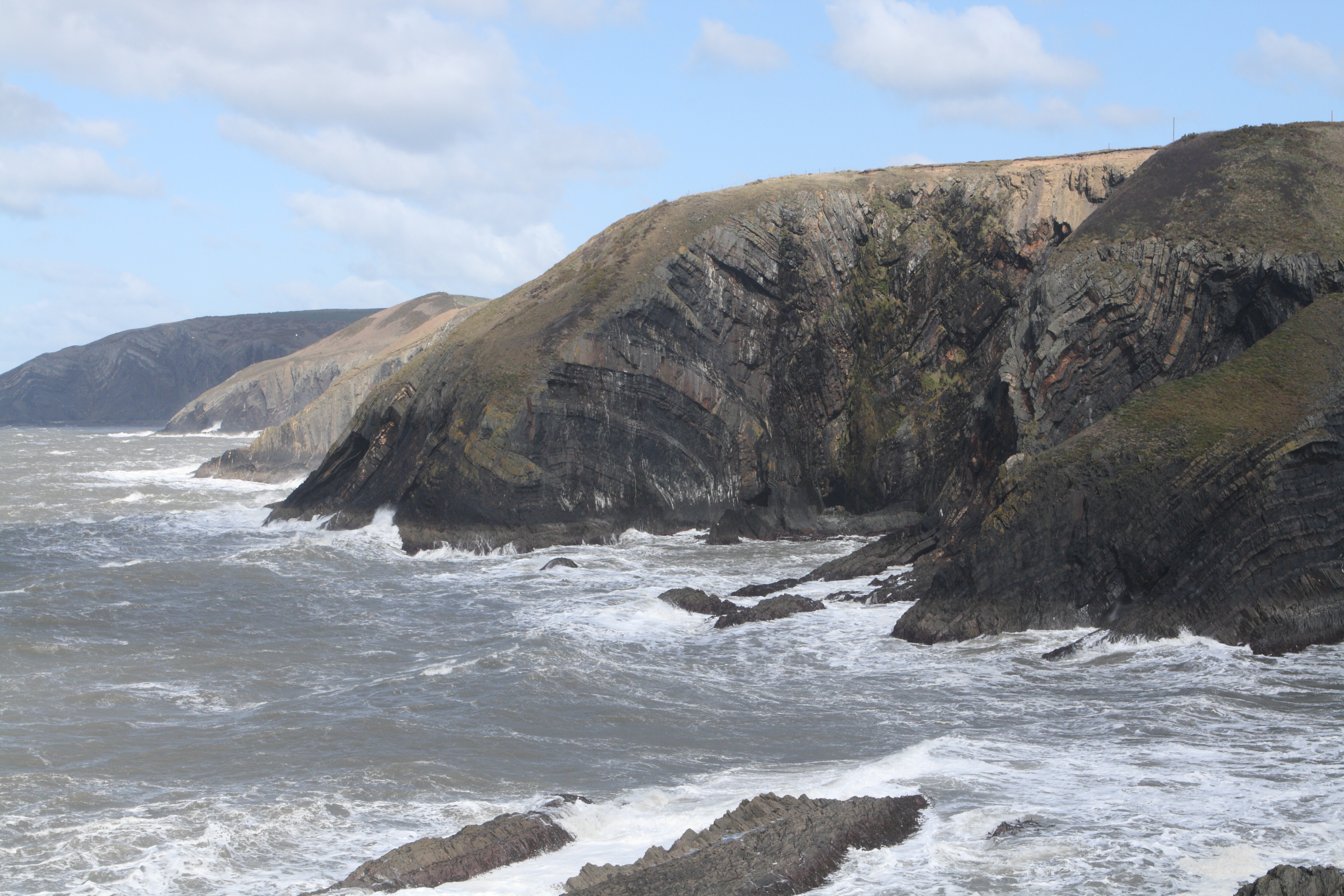
Looking towards Cemaes Head from Ceibwr Bay to the south. The contorted strata is evident.

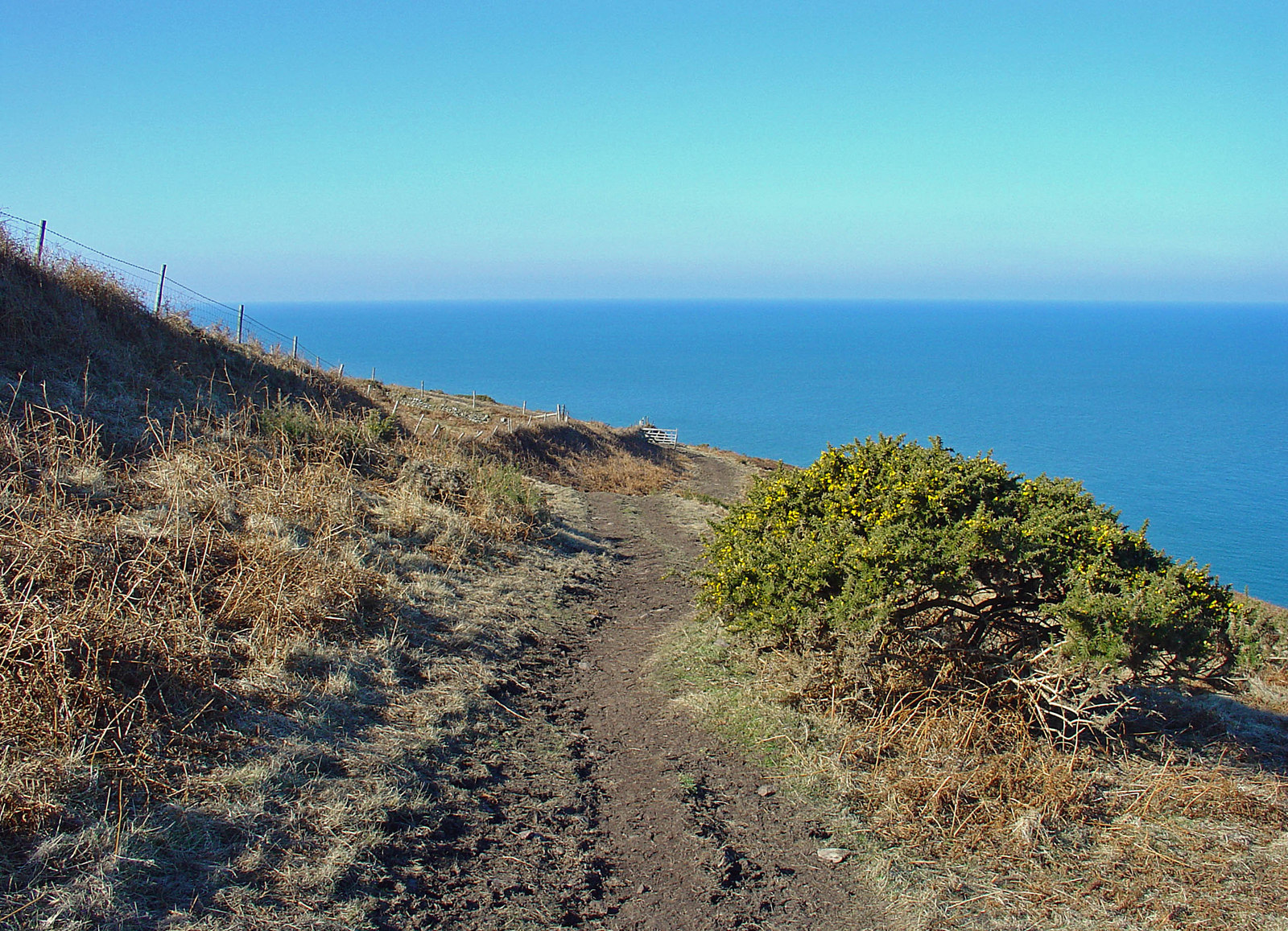
The coastal path on Cemaes Head

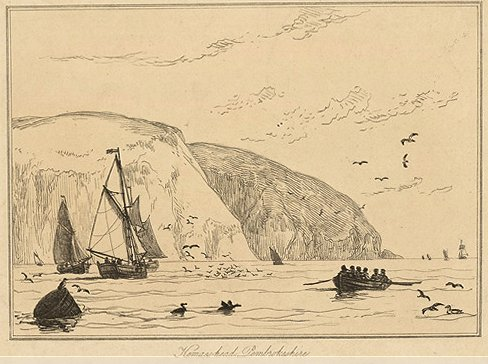
A drawing of 'Kemaes Head' as viewed from the sea, by William Daniell, 1815

== See also ==
- Poppit Sands
- Cardigan Island
- List of Sites of Special Scientific Interest in Pembrokeshire
