= Margaret Price =

Welsh operatic soprano (1941–2011)

Price as Elisabetta in Verdi's Don Carlo at the Metropolitan Opera in 1989.

Margaret Price singing the Welsh folk song Wrth Fynd Efo Deio i Dywyn (extract)

Dame Margaret Berenice Price DBE (13 April 1941 – 28 January 2011) was a Welsh soprano.

== Early years ==
Price was born in Blackwood, near Caerphilly in South Wales, to a Welsh-speaking family. Born with deformed legs, she underwent surgery at age four and suffered pain in her legs for the rest of her life. She often looked after her younger brother John, who had learning difficulties. The family had ties in Cardigan and north Pembrokeshire and often spent their summer holiday in Moylgrove.

Her father, a talented amateur pianist, was opposed to a musical career, and hence she never attended an eisteddfod and was aiming for a career as a biology teacher. She was educated at Pontllanfraith Secondary School, near Caerphilly. When she was 15, her school music teacher organised an audition with Charles Kennedy Scott, who persuaded her to study with him at Trinity College of Music in London and obtained a scholarship for her. Over the next few years Price trained as a mezzo-soprano.

== Career ==
After graduation, she joined the Ambrosian Singers, performing with them on the soundtrack of the 1961 Charlton Heston film El Cid. She remained only briefly with that ensemble and later admitted to having struggled somewhat during her time with that group due to her inadequate skills at sight-singing.

Unrecognised through the normal channel of competitions, she was championed by her now-converted father, who wrote to opera houses to arrange auditions. As a result, Price made her operatic debut in 1962, singing Cherubino in Mozart's The Marriage of Figaro at the Welsh National Opera.

After her father wrote to the Royal Opera House in Covent Garden in 1962, she auditioned and was turned down twice by musical director Georg Solti who said that she "lacked charm". However, she was accepted as an understudy, thanks to casting director Joan Ingpen, and she formed of a close personal and professional relationship with pianist and conductor James Lockhart. Solti added a rider to her contract, stating that she should never expect to sing lead in the main house, so she sang minor roles as a mezzo. Her breakthrough came in 1963 when Teresa Berganza cancelled a performance and Price got the chance to take over as her nominated understudy, again in the role of Cherubino, a performance that made her famous overnight.

After that, Lockhart convinced Price to take further singing lessons to improve her technique and develop the luminous high range that made her one of the most popular lyric sopranos of the 1970s and 1980s.

In 1967, she performed with Benjamin Britten's English Opera Group in Mozart's The Impresario, and as Titania in Britten's A Midsummer Night's Dream. In 1968, critic Desmond Shawe-Taylor called her singing "brilliant, flexible and large scale" as Constanze in Mozart's Die Entführung aus dem Serail at Glyndebourne.

As Price did not enjoy travelling, she always kept a "home" stage, where she stayed and performed for the majority of each year. Initially this was Covent Garden, but from 1971 she made Germany her base, initially at Cologne Opera where she made her debut in Don Giovanni, and latterly the Bavarian State Opera in Munich, where she lived until retirement in 1999. Price hence formed a professional relationship with Otto Klemperer, who conducted her first recording of a major role in a complete opera – Fiordiligi in Mozart's Così fan tutte. The 1972 recording established Price as a Mozart specialist.

In the years that followed, Price appeared as a guest at important opera houses. Her Metropolitan Opera debut came in 1985 as Desdemona in Verdi's Otello. In 1989 she appeared in the WNO production of Salome at the Brooklyn Academy of Music in New York, in a performance attended by the Prince and Princess of Wales.

== Repertoire ==
Price was most famous for her Mozart roles, especially Fiordiligi, Donna Anna in Don Giovanni, the Countess in The Marriage of Figaro (after having sung Cherubino and Barbarina at the beginning of her career), and Pamina in The Magic Flute. Additionally, she sang Verdi roles, such as Amelia (Un ballo in maschera, a role she also recorded with Luciano Pavarotti), Élisabeth (Don Carlos) and Desdemona (Otello), her debut role at the Met, as well as the title role in Aida (also with Pavarotti in San Francisco, which was preserved on video), Richard Strauss's Ariadne (Ariadne auf Naxos) and Adriana Lecouvreur by Cilea. Price was also very active as a lieder singer, equally at home in the romantic idiom of Franz Schubert and Robert Schumann or Richard Strauss and the Second Viennese School.

During her career, Price made many recordings of operas and of lieder. One of her most famous recordings is as Isolde in Carlos Kleiber's complete recording of Richard Wagner's Tristan und Isolde, a role she never sang on stage. She was a Kammersängerin of the Bavarian State Opera.

== Later years ==
Price retired to a 160-year-old farmhouse on Ceibwr Bay, part of Moylegrove near Cardigan, Ceredigion, overlooking Cardigan Bay. From there, she successfully bred and showed Golden Retrievers, having the rear seats of her Chrysler removed to create what she termed a "dogmobile." She came out of retirement once to perform at a Remembrance Day concert at her local church, something she later commented on: “It was the most nerve-racking occasion of my life. Never again will I sing in public.”

== Death ==
Price died on 28 January 2011 from heart failure at her home in Ceibwr, near Cardigan, aged 69.

== Honours ==
- Bayerische (Bavarian) Kammersängerin
- Commander of the Order of the British Empire (CBE), 1982 Birthday Honours
- Dame Commander of the Order of the British Empire (DBE), 1993
