= Poppit Sands =

Settlement in Pembrokeshire, Wales

Coordinates: 52.107°N 4.696°W

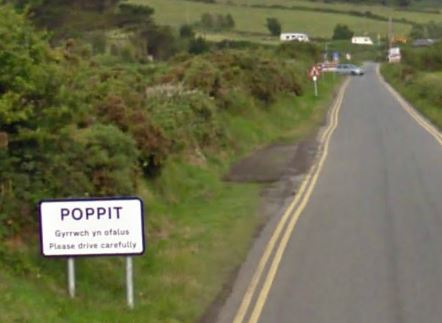
The settlement is called Poppit. This, the main road access, also leads to Poppit Sands.

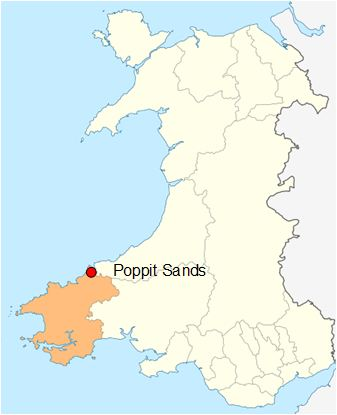
Poppit Sands, showing its location within Pembrokeshire

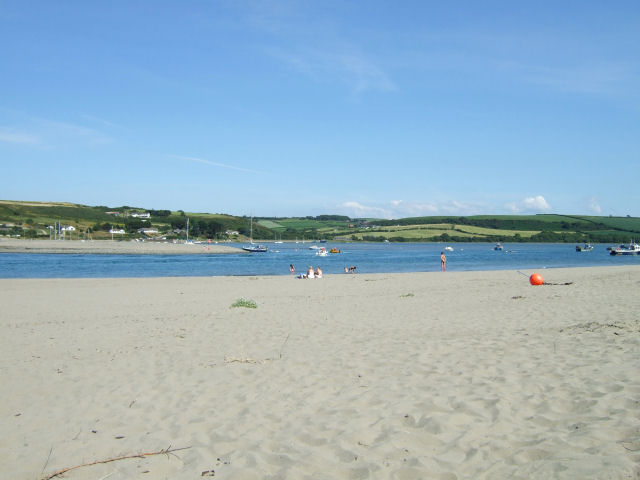
Poppit Sands, looking across the estuary towards Patch

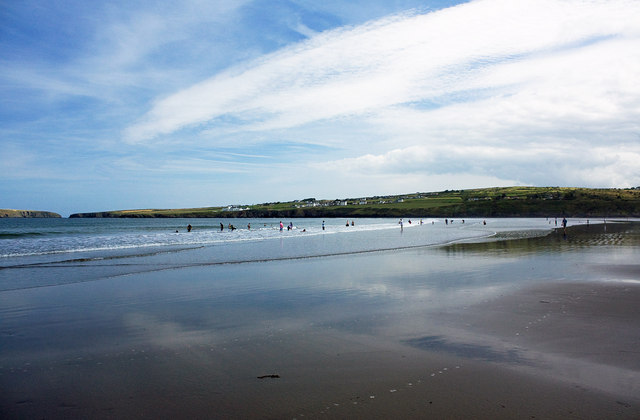
Poppit Sands, looking across the bay entrance towards Gwbert

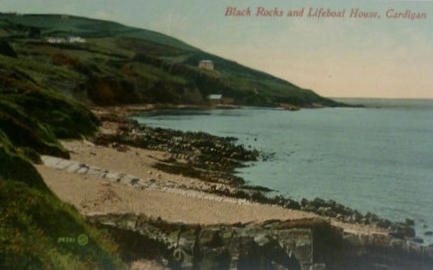
An early 20th century postcard entitled "Black Rocks and Lifeboat House" (centre, just above waterline). This was the 1876 boathouse.

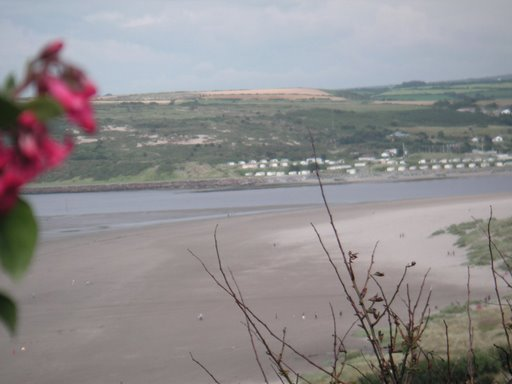
A view of Poppit Sands from the hill above the beach

Poppit is a small, dispersed settlement which lies on the southern side of the estuary of the River Teifi, near Cardigan, in northern Pembrokeshire, Wales.

It is primarily known for its popular sandy beach, called Poppit Sands (Welsh: Traeth Poppit) which adjoins St Dogmaels beach at its eastern estuary end. The beach offers views across the estuary and bay towards Gwbert and Cardigan Island, and the nearest village is St Dogmaels, 1 1/2 miles away.

The beach has Blue Flag status and lifeboat and lifeguard cover.

== Geography ==
=== Features ===
Backed by low dunes, the top of the beach comprises about 80m of dry, very loose sand, making it very popular with families. Lower down it is hard-packed. The beach slopes gently, and therefore the sea is shallow for quite a long way out. Even at high tide there is plenty of soft sand exposed.

On the eastern side of the dunes, erosion has formed sand cliffs over 4 metres (13 feet) high. New dunes are now building up close to the access boardwalk.

When the tide is fully out, the flats at the far south-eastern end (known as Cardigan Bar) extend for nearly a mile and almost reach Gwbert on the other side. However, due to the estuary there are unpredictable currents at this end of the beach.

At the north-western end of the beach there are rock pools which support a myriad of sea-life.

=== Wildlife and plant life ===
The dunes at Poppit Sands are important for wildlife, especially unusual plants such as the bee orchid. National Park staff manage over 20 hectares (50 acres) of dune, marsh and grazing land here, and one of its projects is to turn the willow scrub behind the dunes back to a reed bed.

In the summer months it is often possible to observe bottlenose dolphins, porpoises and Atlantic grey seals in this part of Cardigan Bay. Occasional boat trips around the bay, with wildlife spotting their main aim, leave from Poppit Sands during the summer months.

=== Fish trap ===
Archaeologists studying aerial photographs of the coast have discovered a large V-shaped fish trap in the sea off the Poppit coast. Some 280 yards (260 m) long, and comprising a wall 3 feet (0.91 m) wide, it now lies totally submerged (under some 12 feet (3.7 m) of water), even at low tide. Estimated to be some 1,000 years old, in those days it would have appeared at low tide, acting as a shallow rock pool, trapping fish behind the walls as the tide flowed out. At that time the sea level was lower and the entrance to the Teifi Estuary was nearer the Poppit side.

Further research into the fish-trap, the rocks of which are now covered in worms, algae and sea anemones, and only protrude by some 12 inches (300 mm) above the sea-bed, is currently being undertaken by Pembrokeshire College and the Dyfed Archaeological Trust.

=== Geology ===
The rocks of the area are mostly mudstone, deposited in a deep ocean basin some 450 million years ago. Very few fossils are found in the rocks because the sediments were deposited in such deep water. Associated locally with the mudstone are beds of hard sandstone (turbidites); at Poppit Sands these beds are up to a metre or two thick. Deposited as muds and sands on the ocean floor, they were subsequently squeezed and folded by major earth movements, which changed the mudstones into slates. Excellent examples of these folded rocks can be seen at the western end of Poppit Sands.

The last (Eemian) interglacial period, which lasted for some 30,000 years, is sometimes termed the "Poppit Interglacial", the name deriving from Poppit Sands. Here there is a perfectly exposed beach, where it rests upon a classic example of a raised beach platform just above the high-water mark.

=== Climate ===
As with the rest of the British Isles, Poppit Sands experiences a maritime climate with cool summers and mild winters. The nearest official Met Office weather station for which online records are available is at Aberporth, which is 6.5 miles (10.7 km) ENE of Poppit Sands, and has a similar coastal aspect.

Typically, less than 3 days of the year will reach 25.1 °C (77.2 °F) or above, the warmest of which should rise to 26.8 °C (80.2 °F) - The highest temperature recorded was 32.7 °C (90.9 °F), during July 2006. On average 18.3 nights will report air frost and the coldest night of the year should fall to −4.5 °C (23.9 °F). The lowest recorded temperature was −9.9 °C (14.2 °F), during January 1963.

Rainfall averages around 870mm a year, with at least 1mm falling on 143.5 days.

Climate data for Aberporth Weather Station (6.5 Miles ENE of Poppit Sands) at 133m asl, 1971-2000, Extremes 1960-present
Month	Jan	Feb	Mar	Apr	May	Jun	Jul	Aug	Sep	Oct	Nov	Dec	Year
Record high °C (°F)	13.4 (56.1)	15.2 (59.4)	21.0 (69.8)	25.6 (78.1)	26.6 (79.9)	31.5 (88.7)	32.7 (90.9)	31.5 (88.7)	25.2 (77.4)	22.0 (71.6)	17.0 (62.6)	14.1 (57.4)	32.7 (90.9)
Mean daily maximum °C (°F)	7.3 (45.1)	7.3 (45.1)	8.7 (47.7)	10.6 (51.1)	13.7 (56.7)	15.9 (60.6)	18.0 (64.4)	18.1 (64.6)	16.1 (61.0)	13.2 (55.8)	10.0 (50.0)	8.3 (46.9)	12.3 (54.1)
Mean daily minimum °C (°F)	2.9 (37.2)	2.6 (36.7)	3.8 (38.8)	4.9 (40.8)	7.5 (45.5)	10.0 (50.0)	12.2 (54.0)	12.3 (54.1)	10.7 (51.3)	8.4 (47.1)	5.6 (42.1)	3.9 (39.0)	7.1 (44.8)
Record low °C (°F)	−9.9 (14.2)	−7.5 (18.5)	−6.6 (20.1)	−2.0 (28.4)	0.1 (32.2)	1.7 (35.1)	5.6 (42.1)	5.5 (41.9)	3.3 (37.9)	−0.9 (30.4)	−5.0 (23.0)	−6.0 (21.2)	−9.9 (14.2)
Average precipitation mm (inches)	88.5 (3.48)	62.7 (2.47)	63.7 (2.51)	50.7 (2.00)	48.2 (1.90)	61.1 (2.41)	49.2 (1.94)	68.2 (2.69)	75.7 (2.98)	104.2 (4.10)	98.3 (3.87)	99.2 (3.91)	870.2 (34.26)
Mean monthly sunshine hours	54.6	74.0	109.7	168.6	213.6	190.5	198.7	184.8	141.0	100.1	63.3	45.6	1,544.5
Source: Met Office

A detailed daily weather forecast for the area, including sea temperature, can be found here.

== The sands ==
=== Activities ===
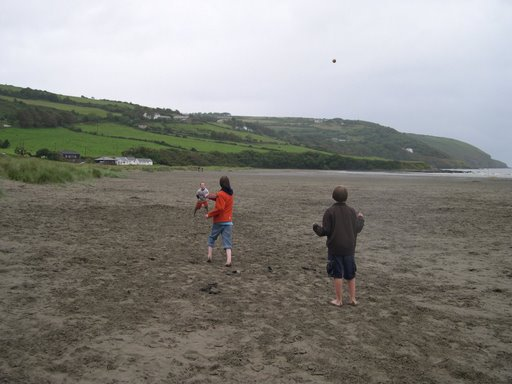
Looking towards the northern end of the beach

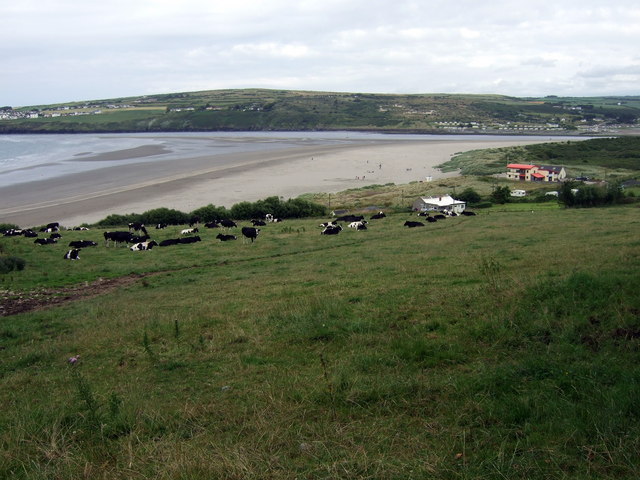
Looking down onto Poppit Sands - the RNLI station is on the right.

The area is a gathering spot for surfers and boogie-boarders. As such, daily surf reports are issued. The hard sand below the high tide line also attracts power-kiting, land-boarding and buggying.

The beach is dog-friendly. Although some restrictions apply in the summer months, there is nevertheless a large area set aside for dog-walkers. The beach and the estuary flats are popular with dog-walkers all year round.

=== Fishing ===
For fishermen the beach offers good catches of flounder, cod and whiting in winter, and mullet can be caught near the river mouth. Salmon and sea trout run the river from March to October (an Environment Agency rod licence is necessary if trying for sea trout on the incoming tide).

=== Publicity ===
Local photographer Michael Jackson spent a considerable amount of time between 2007 and 2012 photographing Poppit Sands beach, from above and at dusk. His work won numerous awards, including three Hasselblad Masters finalist places (in 2008, 2009 and 2010). The work has been exhibited in the UK, Hong Kong, Copenhagen and New York, and has also been published in a book entitled Poppit Sands Moonscapes.

=== Status ===
Up until 2012 the beach carried Blue Flag status, but following a wet year, which resulted in more naturally occurring bacteria present, and a general tightening of criteria, it lost this status in 2013. It regained its Blue Flag status in 2016 and retained it in 2017 and 2018. It is also a Seaside Award (Resort) winner.

=== Safety ===
Lifeguards patrol the beach from late June to early September, from 10.00 - 6.00 each day, and bathing is safe within the patrolled area, marked by flags.

Water users are advised not to swim in the estuary to the south due to fast currents, but rather to stay at the main beach.

There is a Poppit Sands Surf Lifesaving Club. In June 2011 it was announced that the club had been awarded £35,980 from the Big Lottery Fund, for use on new equipment and to provide additional opportunities for recruiting new members.

=== Lifeboat station ===
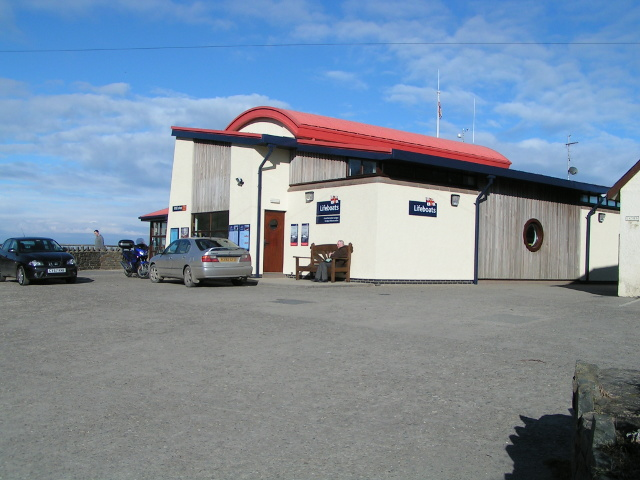
The RNLI Station

The first RNLI lifeboat station at Poppit Sands was opened in 1971. The original Cardigan lifeboat station was built in 1849 (on the south side of the River Teifi below Penrhyn Castle) after the loss of the crew from the brig Agnes Lee. This station was taken over by the RNLI the following year. In 1876 a replacement boathouse with slipway was built, the remains of which can be seen down the estuary at Black Rocks, but this was abandoned in 1932, leaving the nearest other stations at Fishguard and Aberystwyth. The subsequent popularity of this area, with increased leisure incidents and accidents, led to the decision to construct a station on the present site.

In 1987 a new boathouse, built for the new C class lifeboat, was officially opened. Then in 1998 a new double boathouse was completed for a B class and D class lifeboats, for launching vehicles, and it also provided improved crew facilities. Consequently, the station today houses two inshore lifeboats, which operate from the beach.

The station is open to the public on Wednesdays (18:00-20:00) and Sundays (10:00-12:00), and also houses an RNLI shop, open throughout the year, volunteers permitting.

== Facilities and access ==
Poppit Sands lies at the northern end of the Pembrokeshire Coast Path, a 186 mile long-distance walk, now part of the Wales Coast Path. There is a large pay car-park, with adjacent public toilets. Over the winter and spring of 2012/13 the car park was renovated, and now provides marked bays for 100 cars, with an improved bus-turning area.

The cafe and shop, located by the car park, has also been recently refurbished, and additionally sells beach items like beach balls, inflatables, buckets and spades, and a limited range of body boards and wetsuits.

The main beach is accessed from a boardwalk, and is suitable for disabled access.

Poppit Sands gives its name to "The Poppit Rocket", a local bus service which largely follows the coast between Cardigan and Fishguard, and which calls at the beach here.

Poppit Sands Youth Hostel, a former inn, is up the lane towards Cemaes Head, and has views over the estuary and bay.

Camping is no longer available at Poppit Sands. However 500m up from the youth hostel is Alltycoed Campsite

The nearest pub/hotel is the Webley Hotel, located on the road between Poppit Sands car park and the village of St. Dogmaels.

== Etymology ==
Despite the wealth of travel literature and gazetteers which prevailed in the 19th century, and which include information on nearby Cardigan, the growing resort of Gwbert (across the estuary), and the Abbey at St. Dogmaels, they fail to record any beach here, and it seems it did not become known as a resort until later in the 20th century.

The earliest published reference to the name "Poppit" appears to be in Archaeologia Cambrensis by W. Pickering, 1902, where there is a reference to "the main road to Poppit".

The name "Poppit", however, can be traced back to the 16th century, and is found in documents relating to the Dissolution of the Monasteries, in particular with regard to lands owned by nearby St. Dogmael's Abbey. A document of 1537 records :

"One close called Potpitt containing 15 acres adjacent to the seashore - 6s.8d."

A later Patent Roll of 1544 records :

"Charter of John Bradshaw to him and his heirs .... Also all that our close called Potpyt containing by estimation fifteen acres adjacent to the seashore."

In "The History of St. Dogmaels Abbey", by Emily M. Pritchard, 1907, it states :

"Among the particulars for grants, dated March 1537, is the preliminary account of the Manor and property of the Abbey of St. Dogmaels .... . These [Abbey] deeds should be specially interesting to the present inhabitants of St Dogmaels, owing to the family names, which are still mostly the same, and also the place names of various portions of land, lately belonging to the Abbey. Among these, Potpitt , now Poppitt , formerly the name for 'Pwll-cam' (the crooked pool)."

"It is between this Manaian Marsh and the sea that this Poppit lays, mentioned as Potpitt in one of the Abbey grants; the sands also on the same side of the river are called the Poppit Sands."

=== Usage on maps ===
On 19th century maps the north-western headland of Trwyn Careg-ddu is named, but not until the 1930s did the name "Poppit Sands" first appear on Ordnance survey maps. The increase in small properties in the area from the 1970s onwards has led to the designation of "Poppit" as an area and settlement in its own right, although this name is still not in fact used on O.S. maps. Cardigan Bar, exposed at low tide, was marked on maps before any usage of the name "Poppit Sands", and is still used today.

== See also ==
- Blue Flag Beaches of Wales
- Cemaes Head

== Gallery ==
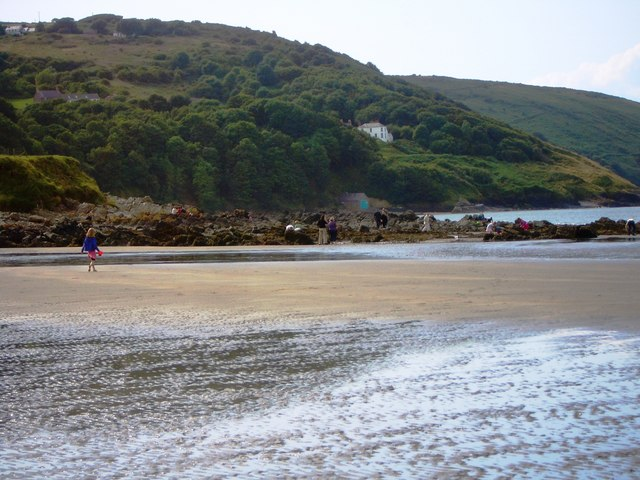
The rocky western end of the beach

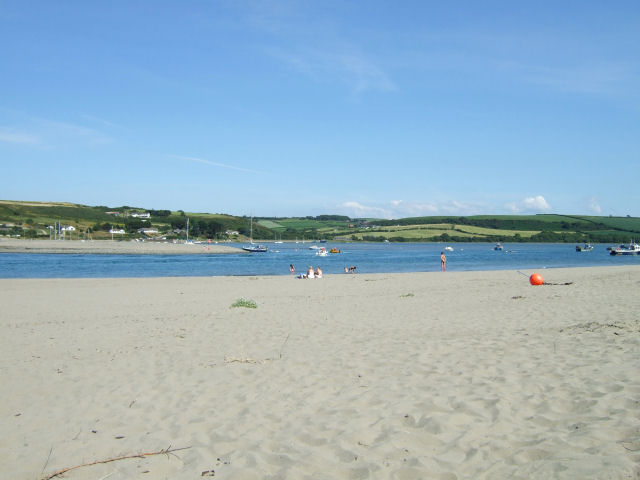
The beach in mid-summer

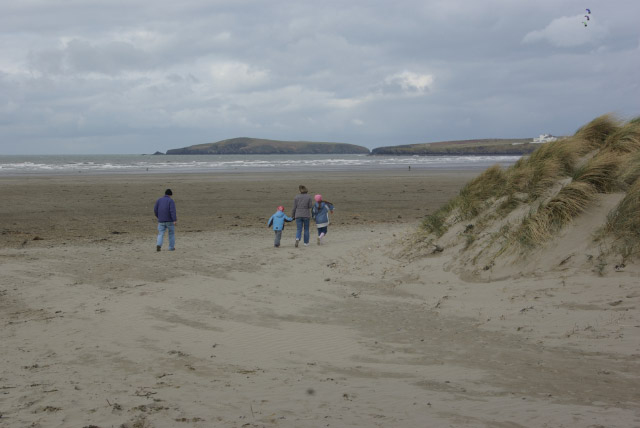
The edge of the dunes

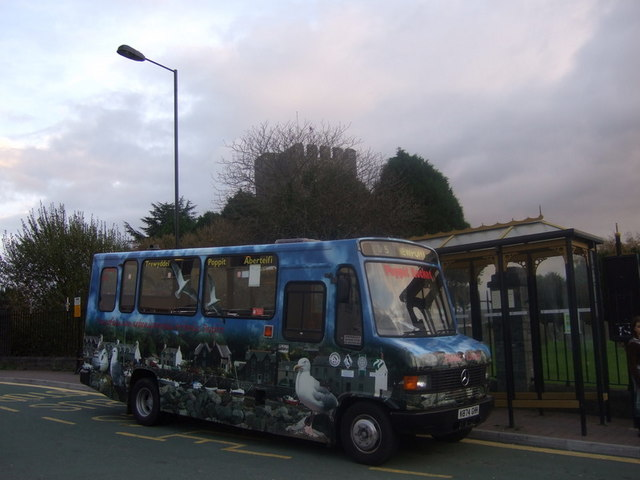
The Poppit Rocket in Cardigan

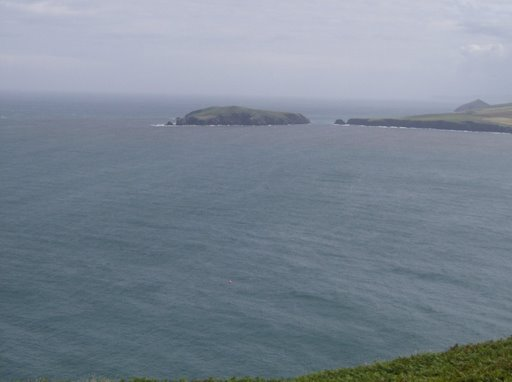
A view of Cardigan Island from Cemaes Head, above Poppit Sands
