= Ceibwr Bay Fault =

Geological fault in Great Britain

Coordinates: 52.09°N 4.65°W

The Ceibwr Bay Fault is a WSW-ENE trending fault zone that cuts Ordovician rocks of the Ashgill Nantmel Mudstones Formation and the Caradoc Dinas Island Formation. The fault is exposed on the south side of Cardigan Bay in Wales and forms part of the Fishguard-Cardigan Fault Zone. It extends from the coast at Ceibwr Bay at its western end to the coast at Aberporth at its eastern end. The fault zone is thought to have been active as a normal fault throughout the deposition of the Ordovician sequence.

== See also ==
- List of geological faults of Wales
