= Cardigan Bay Special Area of Conservation =

Special Area of Conservation in Wales

Coordinates: 52°15′N 4°32′W

Cardigan Bay Special Area of Conservation (SAC) in Cardigan Bay, West Wales, UK, has been designated under European Union law to protect a variety of important species and habitats.

Located between Ceibwr Bay in Pembrokeshire and Aberarth in Ceredigion, and extending almost 20 km from the coast, the SAC protects the wildlife of some 1000 km² of sea.

== Conservation aims ==
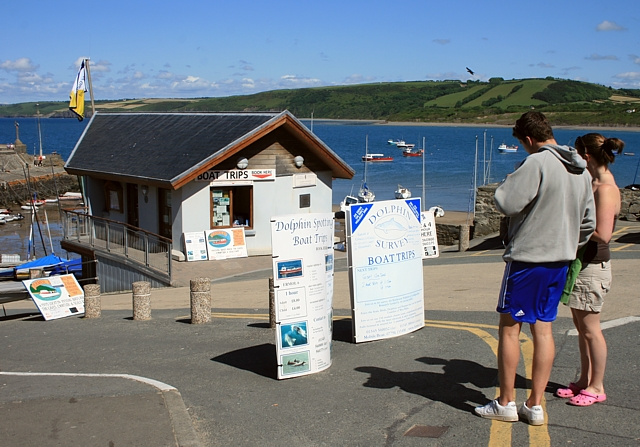
Dolphin watching information for visitors

The protected area supports a large variety of marine animals and plants, from reef-building worms to bottlenose dolphins—Europe’s largest population of the latter, there being few places where they are more easily seen in the wild.

There are seven features for whose conservation the area has been designated:

- Bottlenose dolphins, Tursiops truncatus
- Atlantic grey seals, Halichoerus grypus
- River lampreys, Lampetra fluviatilis
- Sea lampreys, Petromyzon marinus
- Reefs
- Sandbanks (slightly covered by seawater at all times)
- Sea caves (submerged or partially submerged)

"Cardigan Bay’s Big Three" include bottlenose dolphins, harbor porpoises and Atlantic grey seals. Other mammals, such as minke whales, Risso's dolphins and common dolphins, many species of sea birds such as puffin, and sharks can be seen as well. Seasonal or rarer megafauna visiting the area include humpback whales, Fin whales, sperm whales, pygmy sperm whales, northern bottlenose whales, Sowerby's beaked whales, killer whales, long-finned pilot whales, thresher sharks, basking sharks, and sunfish. The leatherback turtle, a very rare, critically endangered species, is also known to visit the bay.

Management of the SAC is directed through the Relevant Authorities Group (RAG), coordinated by a SAC Officer. The aim of the SAC is to maintain its rich and varied marine life (biodiversity) in at least as good a condition as when the site was first designated – ideally to bring it into ‘Favourable Conservation Status’. Special attention is paid to ensuring that human activities carried out in the area are done so sustainably.

== See also ==
- Special Area of Conservation for definition and assessment methodology
