= Gwbert =

Village in Ceredigion, Wales

Coordinates: 52.116°N 4.686°W

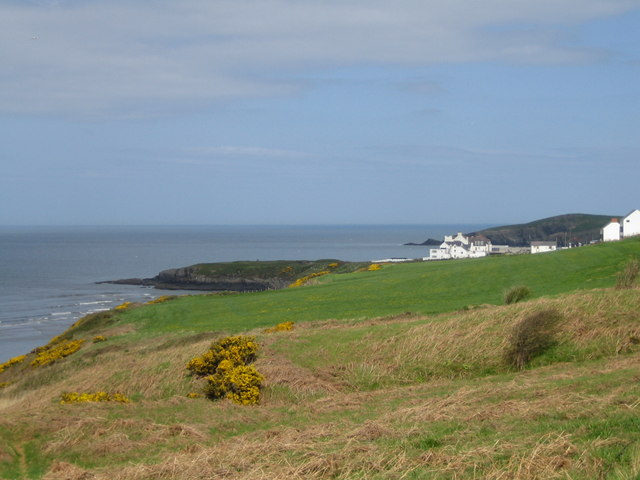
- The shore by Coronation Drive, Gwbert, Ceredigion

- Location within Ceredigion
- OS grid reference: SN175465
- Community: Y Ferwig
- Principal area: Ceredigion
- Preserved county: Dyfed
- Country: Wales
- Sovereign state: United Kingdom
- Post town: CARDIGAN
- Postcode district: SA43
- Dialling code: 01239
- Police: Dyfed-Powys
- Fire: Mid and West Wales
- Ambulance: Welsh
- UK Parliament: Ceredigion Preseli
- Senedd Cymru – Welsh Parliament: Ceredigion Penfro

Gwbert (Welsh pronunciation: [ˈɡubɛrt]), also known as Gwbert-on-Sea, is a cliff-top coastal village in Y Ferwig community, Ceredigion, Wales. It lies at the most southerly coastal point of Ceredigion, on the eastern shore of the Teifi estuary, from where there are views westwards over Cardigan Bay, and south-westwards to Poppit Sands and the headland of Cemaes Head, in neighbouring Pembrokeshire. It is reached by the B4548 road from the town of Cardigan (Welsh: Aberteifi), 2.8 miles (4.5 km) away.

== History ==
Gwbert as seen today essentially dates back only as far as the early 20th century, the most prominent buildings being the extensive Cliff Hotel and the smaller Gwbert Hotel. The settlement has an interesting history as a failed would-be resort, but despite its lack of facilities it is a popular holiday venue, being within easy reach of the Ceredigion and Pembrokeshire coastlines, both rich in scenery and wildlife.

The Ceredigion Coast Path, a 60-mile (97 km) long-distance footpath, and part of the Wales Coast Path, passes through Gwbert, making a marked detour inland north of the Cliff Hotel to avoid a dangerous cliff path. (Note: Although a right-of-way continues along the coast for a short distance past the Cliff Hotel, the dangerous condition of the cliff beyond this point has necessitated a detour of the Coastal Path inland and around the Farm Park, returning to the coast on the northern side of the Farm Park, and then continuing to Mwnt. This route is marked on the latest Ordnance Survey maps. On 12 September 2014, the definitive route of the local section of the Coastal Path was determined by the WAG inspectors. The revised order takes effect immediately. Details were published in a public notice in the Cambrian News, 23 September 2014.)

== Etymology ==
Before the area was populated at the end of the 19th century, it was often called The Gwbert.

The name Gwbert is thought to derive from a Celtic dedication (i.e. St Cubert), suggesting that a chapel may have existed here at one time. Gwbert, a wandering saint, is said to have landed here and sheltered in a cave. In fact, Gwbert is among a group of five Saints (the others being Pedrog, Briog, Carannog and Meugana) honoured in church dedications near the mouth of the river Teifi, and also in churches lying in close proximity to each other in mid-Cornwall, and then again in neighbouring churches in Brittany.

Although Gwbert is not recorded, by name, as a settlement in medieval documentation, Towyn Farm—on the northern edge of the adjoining dunes—was recorded as a late medieval gentry house/settlement, owned by Gwilym ap Einon, constable of Cardigan Castle, in 1326.

The name "Pant-y-Gilbert" appears on maps of 1697, and both this and "Gwbert" had been used by 1748. The spelling "Goobert" appears on an 1838 map.

== Population ==
In 1833 the population of the whole Ferwig parish was 439.

The 1851 census recorded 378 inhabitants.

In 2001 the rural community of Y Ferwig (which extends south-east of the A487, and of which Gwbert comprises only some 15 per cent in area) had a population of 1,177. Of these:

- 63.1 per cent spoke, read and/or wrote Welsh.
- 31.4 per cent were aged 45–64, and 22.17 per cent aged 65 or over.
- The mean age of the whole population was 44.3, the median age being 47.0.
- 40 per cent were economically active.
- 22.4 per cent reported having a limiting long-term illness.

Although Gwbert and Ferwig are only one mile apart (and share a common Community Council) their demographics and environments are very different. Ferwig is a long-established agricultural area, characterised by little change to the indigenous population, or to their lifestyles. Gwbert has only existed for little more than 120 years, and is considerably more diverse. Since inception it has been predominantly a community of well-funded incomers from many areas of Wales and beyond, permanent and temporary. The vibrant tourist and sporting facilities encourage out-of-town visitors; the residents of the caravan park and hotels more than double the population for much of the year, and additional diversity is created by international staff within the hospitality sector. The dominant language is English.

The main settlement of Gwbert today comprises some 60 residential properties, mostly located on Coronation Drive, Towyn Farm, and Evelyn Terrace, a number of which are not owner-occupied, but are leased out for holiday use. There are approximately 70 residential caravans on the Patch Caravan Park, usable from March to October. There are close to 100 bedrooms within the two main hotels.

Employment in Gwbert is provided by the Cliff Hotel, the Gwbert Hotel, Cardigan Golf Club, and Cardigan Island Farm Park. Many of these workers travel in from nearby areas, notably from Cardigan, which also provides an additional source of employment for Gwbert's small working population.

== Facilities ==
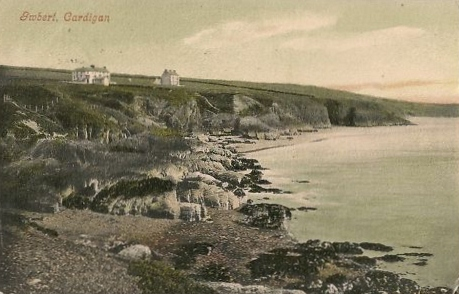
A postcard, postally used in 1904, showing "Gwbert, Cardigan"

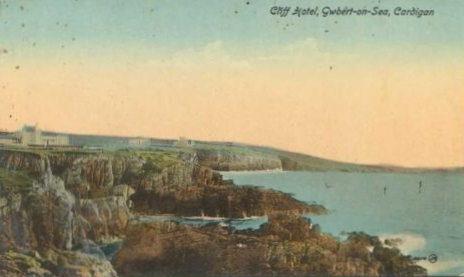
A postcard, postally used in 1919, showing "Cliff Hotel, Gwbert-on-Sea, Cardigan"

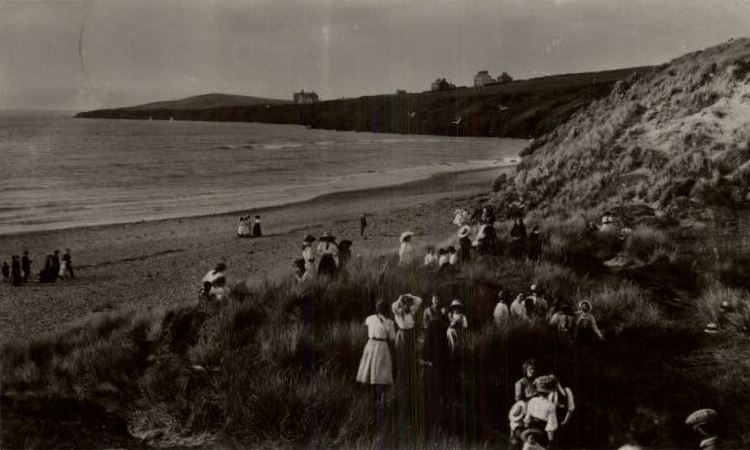
A postcard, pre-1918, showing the popular beach at Patch. The few properties in Gwbert at the time can be seen on the cliff in the distance

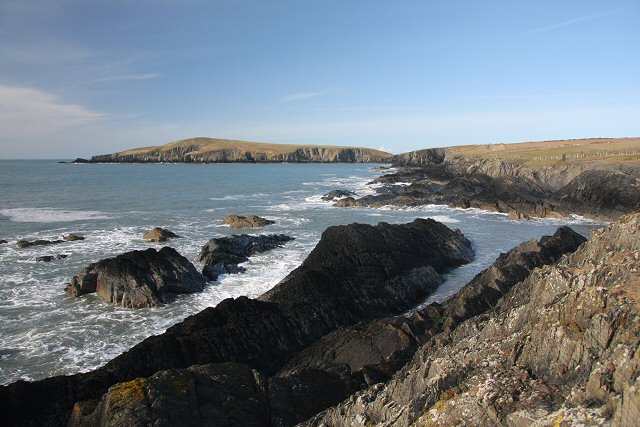
The view north towards Cardigan Island from Craig-y-Gwbert

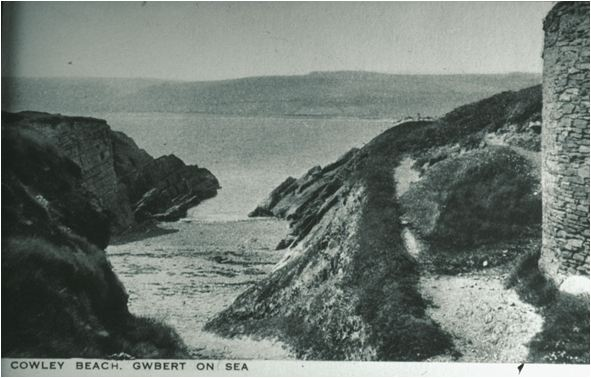
An old postcard showing "Cowley Beach, Gwbert on Sea". This small bay can be accessed from beside Craig-y-Gwbert. The Grade II listed lime kiln can be seen on the right.

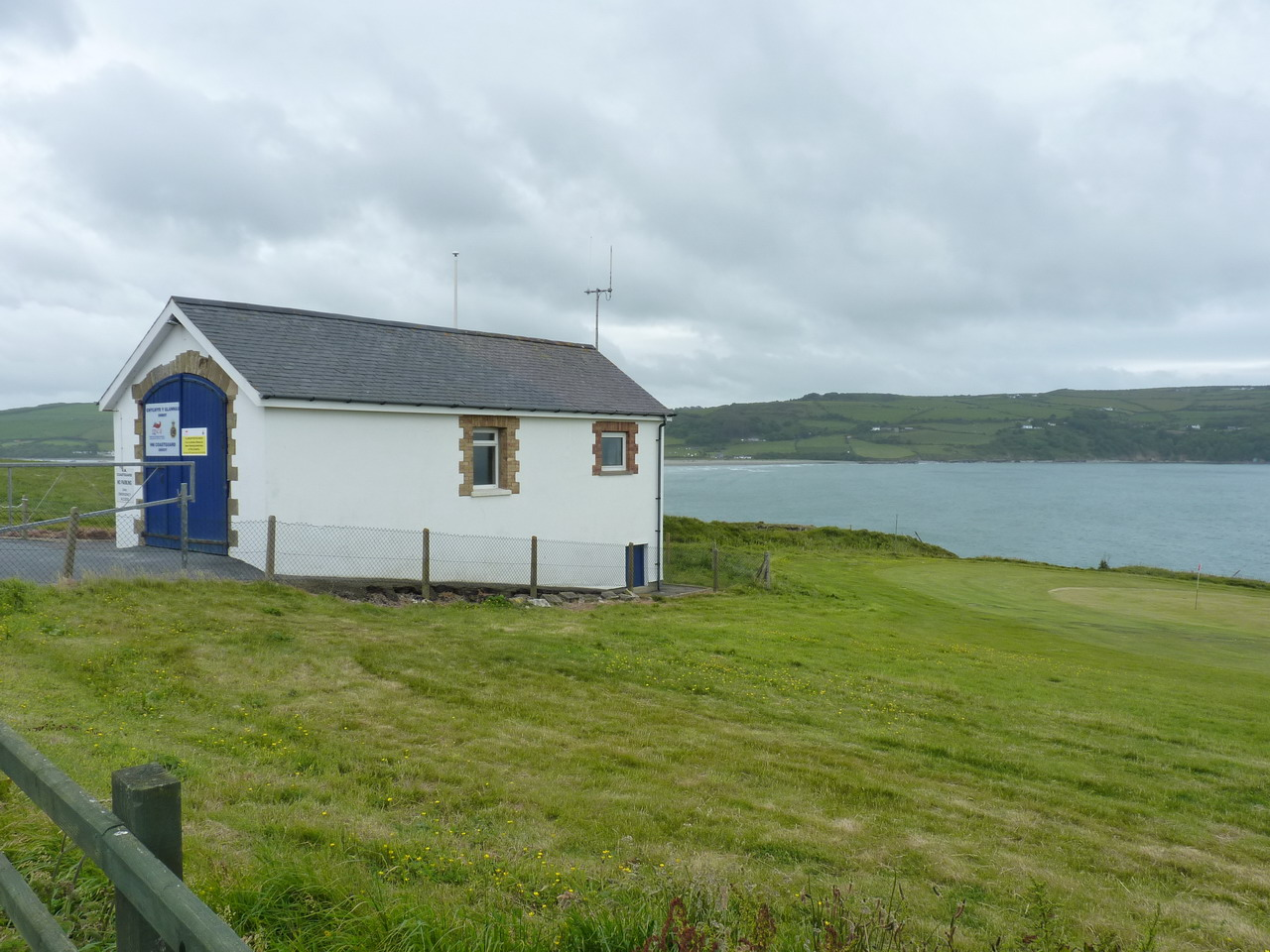
The Coastguard lookout centre at Gwbert. Poppit Sands, an RNLI centre, can be seen in the distance.

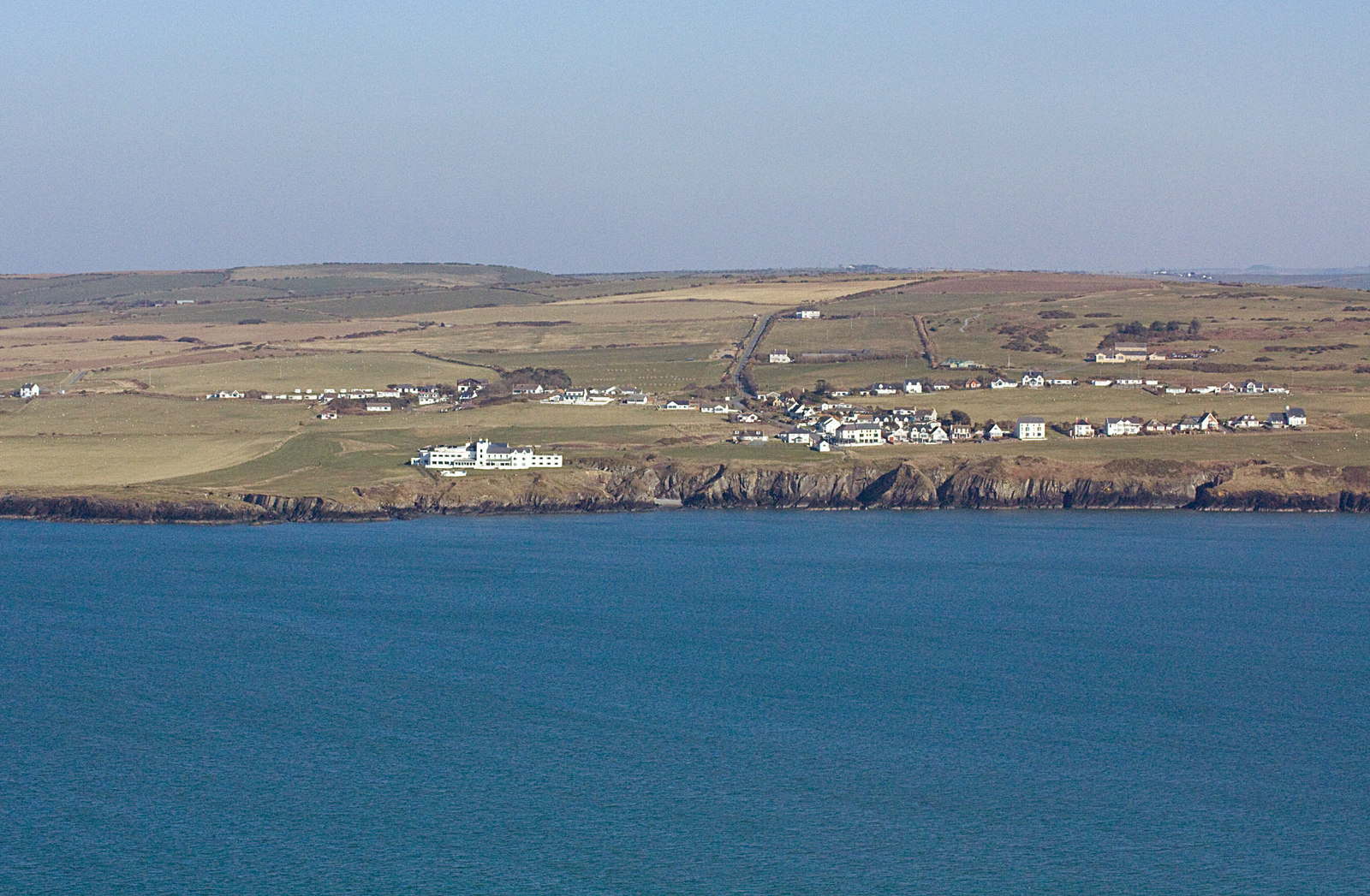
Gwbert viewed from Cemaes Head, across the estuary

Gwbert has no shop, church or school. The nearest churches are at Y Ferwig, some 1.5 miles (2.4 km) away, both being built before any development at Gwbert. The nearest shops and schools are in Cardigan.

Gwbert incorporates the adjacent Towyn Burrows (also called Towyn Warren), much of which is now home to Cardigan Golf Club.

There is a very limited bus service which runs primarily to/from Cardigan. The nearest railway station (Cardigan's station closed in 1963) is at Fishguard, some 20 miles (32 km) away.

Despite the presence of hotels, and the nearby caravan park and boatyard at Patch, the impact of the tourist industry on the landscape is not great.

== Promotion of the "watering hole" ==
In the 1880s the small inn at Gwbert was known as the "Gwbert Watering Hole". The proposal that Gwbert should be a major seaside resort "to challenge Brighton and Scarborough" was first made in 1886, following the opening of the Whitland and Cardigan Railway to nearby Cardigan, a line which was taken over that same year by the Great Western Railway. In 1888 the local Corporation met regarding the leases of the new proposed Villa residences, and in 1889 The Cardigan & Tivyside Advertiser was reporting on "Cardigan's 'New Brighton'", with Mr C.E.D. Morgan-Richardson, a Cardigan solicitor and businessman, named to head a company to develop the old Gwbert Inn property through the purchase of 96 acres of land, and with capital of £20,000. In addition to the considerable development of the Gwbert Inn, a row of villa boarding houses were to be built along what became Evelyn's Terrace. (Morgan-Richardson was later to become mayor of Cardigan.)

In July 1889 the local paper wrote of Gwbert: "Surrounded on two sides by the sea, its rocky boundaries are fringed by golden sands, conveniently approached, abounding with charming nooks for the privacy of bathing without machines, while the magnificent scenery of the opposite, or Pembrokeshire coast, including its bold rocky headlands, glistening sands, snug homesteads &c., form a picture not easily rivalled." There was even talk of the construction of a landing jetty.

Journalist Ebenezer Rees, writing in 1894, referred to Gwbert as "Cardigan's famous and favourite watering place".

In 1897 a new road to Gwbert was built to open up the area; this road initially ran from the Cliff Hotel to Patch (where Cardigan Boating Club is located) but it was many years before it reached its original intended destination, namely Nant-y-Ferwig Bridge. In construction of the new road, parts of the old road ceased to be used, though it can still be traced. Some eleven of the Carn Meini (Preseli Hills) stones have now been utilised as gateposts on the eastern side of the old road, three south of the Gwbert road, and eight to the north. Seven others can be seen straddling a lane leading to Stepside Farm.

Kelly's Directory of South Wales (1895) stated: "Gwbert, a small place on the coast in this parish, on the east side of the estuary of the Teifi, is now rising into favour as a watering place." The adjacent Cardigan & Tivyside Golf Club opened in this year.

In The Rivers of Great Britain (1897), Charles Edwardes wrote: "If you wish to see Teifi, or Tivy, quite to its end, it is worth while to go north another three miles, to Gwbert-on-the-Sea, a distinctly primitive and pleasing watering-place, facing Kemmaes Head, with the mile and a half of Teifi's mouth (at its widest) intervening."

In Walks and Wanderings in County Cardigan (1902), E.R.H. Turner described Gwbert as "a spot on the coast marked by a hotel and a few villas, but sufficiently near to Cardigan to be a favourite pleasure resort." The article continued: "It stands at the mouth of the Teivi estuary on the top of the most romantic cliffs and coves. There are many nooks for bathing, but the possibilities of the place are by no means developed. A new road has been formed across the dunes and along the Teivi shore back to Cardigan town, and possesses the advantage of charming views of the Pembrokeshire hills and cliffs."

The following year the local newspaper reported on the progress of Gwbert as a residential centre, reporting again in 1906 on the "bright look to the development of the resort". In 1910 it carried an article entitled "Gwbert on Sea, where is it and what is it?"

The Encyclopædia Britannica of 1911 also acknowledged the growth: "In modern times several small watering-places have sprung up on the coast, notably at Borth, New Quay, Tresaith, Aberporth and Gwbert."

Growth, whilst clearly recognised, was limited, and The English Illustrated Magazine (vol 39, 1908) wrote "Amongst these [places worthy of attention] may be mentioned Gwbert-on-Sea—where satisfactory bathing is to be obtained. Perched on the brown cliffs which domionate the dancing waves, the little village has, up till now, almost remained undiscovered."

Despite, however, the developers' ambitious plans for growth, along with much publicity and promotion in journals and books of the period, a lack of appropriate accommodation and a derth of facilities meant that relatively little came about, and Gwbert never grew to be anything larger than a very minor resort.

In 1911 Gwbert held grand pre-Coronation festivities for King George V.

== The Cliff Hotel ==
Central to the Gwbert development plan was the extension to the old Gwbert Inn, opened in July 1890 by Mrs Evelyn Morgan-Richardson, wife of the developer. As a present for performing this ceremony she was presented with a "massive silver key" supplied by a Cardigan jeweller. The status of the inn was raised to that of a hotel, at this time being known as the Gwbert Hotel. A promotional book, published by the Great Western Railway in 1907, declared "The Gwbert Hotel, the only one, is situate in its own grounds of 101 acres on the lofty cliffs by the mouth of the river Teifi, facing the Atlantic. An ideal spot for those who seek complete rest, bracing air, and country life with all its glorious advantages." However, in May 1906 the hotel was totally destroyed by fire.

After rebuilding and considerable extension it re-opened in April 1909 as the new Cliff Hotel (the name "Gwbert Hotel" being later used by another hotel), and the golf links was set out to additionally attract visitors. (The Cardigan and Tivyside Golf Club on the adjacent burrows had "died a natural death" by this time, through lack of patronage.) Early publicity postcards from the hotel proclaimed: "The Bishop of Bangor writes of Gwbert—'This is one of the most charming spots I ever visited.'"

The Cliff Hotel was sold to new owners in April 1913, and more recently it has again been extended and refurbished with the addition of more rooms and a new spa and leisure complex.

== The coastline ==
The coastline around Gwbert is part of Ceredigion Heritage Coast, a protected area running from Gwbert northwards to Aberystwyth. It has been designated a Special Area of Conservation.

The Ceredigion Coast Path at this point runs northwards through Patch and Gwbert, on towards and beyond Mwnt, but it does not follow the coastline itself. The official route currently runs eastwards to Y Ferwig, thence northwards to the coastline at Mwnt. An alternative route, heading north from Cardigan Island Farm Park to reach the coastline much sooner, is currently under dispute, with alleged dangerous cliff sections. South of Gwbert, at St Dogmaels, the Coast Path links to the Pembrokeshire Coast Path.

The sandy area of Towyn Burrows, which comprises much of Gwbert, was caused by strong onshore winds following the last ice age, which left deposits of Irish Sea glacial till, now overshadowed by the extensive dunes.

Gwbert beach (at Patch, south of the hamlet) is the nearest beach to Cardigan, is south-west facing, and is sandy. Despite early 20th-century promotion, the tide here can drastically change the shape of the beach, and swimming can be dangerous. Rather than a family beach, it has a reputation for sailing, sea-fishing and extreme sports.

Although Gwbert hamlet has a cliff-top location, it is possible to get down to the sea by Craig-y-Gwbert, below the Cliff Hotel. Steps cut into the rock allow access to Cowley beach and a neighbouring enclosed small bay. There are also accessible beaches below the Cliff Hotel with steps leading down one beach, known to locals as Evelyn's Beach, presumably after Mrs Morgan Richards. There is also a sandy cove, again known locally as Morgan's Beach, and below the hotel are Flat Rock and The Point.

In 1977 concerns were expressed about erosion along the coastline between Cardigan and Gwbert, notably at Patch, where the road was only 45 feet (14 m) from the top of the eroding boulder clay cliffs. In the early 1990s, following further erosion at Pen-Yr-Ergyd, remedial work was undertaken, whereby six groynes consisting of rock mounds were constructed. The scheme cost Ceredigion County Council some £151,000, half of this coming from the European Regional Development Fund.

The coastline around Gwbert is rugged—particularly from Patch headland northward—and in 1922 the trawler Princess Mary was lost on the coast here. A decade later, in 1934, the 7,000-ton liner Herefordshire ran aground on Cardigan Island while being towed to the breaker's yard; the four men aboard were rescued through the use of rocket life-saving equipment that was kept at Gwbert.

Today on the cliff edge there is a Coastguard lookout post, part of the Maritime and Coastguard Agency Emergency Response. The original station was formed in 1878 (there was another on the other side of the estuary, at Penrhyn Castle) and comprised a building 20 ft long, 12 ft wide and 9 ft high. The rescue teams were under the control of coastguards, and were made up of local volunteers. Known as Board of Trade Rocket Life Saving Apparatus Stations (and marked on maps as "Rocket Stations"), each was equipped with ropes, lifebelts, rockets and buoys, and the equipment was carried in a horse-drawn waggon. Today an RNLI lifeboat operates from nearby Poppit Sands, the centre being visible across the estuary from Gwbert.

Teifi Boating Club (Clwb Cychod Teifi) is based at The Patch, Gwbert, on the estuary road towards Cardigan.

== Wildlife ==
The coastal landscape at Gwbert is home to a great variety of sea-life, birds, butterflies and wild flowers.

Bottlenose dolphins and porpoises can often be seen swimming in the bay, as can grey seals from the neighbouring Cardigan Island colony. Cardigan Bay has a resident population of over 100 bottlenose dolphins (some estimates exceed 200), which are most frequently seen off southern Ceredigion between Gwbert and Aberaeron. (This is Europe's largest resident population of bottlenose dolphins, the UK's only other one being in the Moray Firth, Scotland.)

Seals also live in the network of caves below Gwbert's Cardigan Island Coastal Farm Park, where they can often be seen basking on the rocks, notably on Carreg Lydan (Wide Rock).

In recent years visiting basking sharks, sun fish, and even orcas, minke and humpback whales have been spotted. In September 1979 a 24-foot whale was found washed up dead at the foot of the rocks by Clunyrynys Farm, Gwbert. On inspection of the carcass, a scientific officer found a rare 15-spined sea stickleback feeding on it.

Choughs live in holes in the cliffs, and the coast at Gwbert is also home to gannet, razorbill, guillemot, Manx shearwater, black-headed gull and fulmar. On the land other frequently spotted birds are birds of prey such as red kite, buzzard, peregrine falcon, kestrels and sparrowhawks. Skylarks are also a regular sight.

At low tide a variety of wading birds can be seen in the estuary.

During the summer months of June to September many hundreds of Canada geese can daily be seen heading northwards over Gwbert towards the Dyfi estuary marshes, returning each evening. These feral geese reside in the Teifi estuary and valley up as far as Newcastle Emlyn. They also graze on Cardigan Island, and the pond at Gwbert's Cardigan Island Farm Park also attracts geese (the farm has three tame geese) where, on some days, there will be a flock of over 100 Canada geese. Wild shelducks, teal and mallard also nest at the farm.

Boat trips to see the wildlife off the Gwbert coast run from the Teifi Boating Club jetty at Gwbert, as well as from Poppit Sands, and Cardigan.

== Climate ==
As with the rest of the British Isles, Gwbert experiences a maritime climate with cool summers and mild winters. The nearest official Met Office weather station for which online records are available is at Aberporth, which is 5.7 miles (9.2 km) ENE of Gwbert, and has a similar coastal aspect.

Typically, less than three days of the year will reach 25.1 °C (77.2 °F) or above, the warmest of which should rise to 26.8 °C (80.2 °F) The highest temperature recorded was 32.7 °C (90.9 °F) in July 2006. On average 18.3 nights will report air frost and the coldest night of the year should fall to −4.5 °C (23.9 °F). The lowest-recorded temperature was −9.9 °C (14.2 °F), during January 1963.

Rainfall averages around 870 mm a year, with at least 1 mm falling on 143.5 days.

Climate data for Aberporth Weather Station (5.7 miles ENE of Gwbert) at 133 m asl, 1971–2000, Extremes 1960–present
Month	Jan	Feb	Mar	Apr	May	Jun	Jul	Aug	Sep	Oct	Nov	Dec	Year
Record high °C (°F)	13.4 (56.1)	15.2 (59.4)	21.0 (69.8)	25.6 (78.1)	26.6 (79.9)	31.5 (88.7)	32.7 (90.9)	31.5 (88.7)	25.2 (77.4)	22.0 (71.6)	17.0 (62.6)	14.1 (57.4)	32.7 (90.9)
Mean daily maximum °C (°F)	7.3 (45.1)	7.3 (45.1)	8.7 (47.7)	10.6 (51.1)	13.7 (56.7)	15.9 (60.6)	18.0 (64.4)	18.1 (64.6)	16.1 (61.0)	13.2 (55.8)	10.0 (50.0)	8.3 (46.9)	12.3 (54.1)
Mean daily minimum °C (°F)	2.9 (37.2)	2.6 (36.7)	3.8 (38.8)	4.9 (40.8)	7.5 (45.5)	10.0 (50.0)	12.2 (54.0)	12.3 (54.1)	10.7 (51.3)	8.4 (47.1)	5.6 (42.1)	3.9 (39.0)	7.1 (44.8)
Record low °C (°F)	−9.9 (14.2)	−7.5 (18.5)	−6.6 (20.1)	−2.0 (28.4)	0.1 (32.2)	1.7 (35.1)	5.6 (42.1)	5.5 (41.9)	3.3 (37.9)	−0.9 (30.4)	−5.0 (23.0)	−6.0 (21.2)	−9.9 (14.2)
Average precipitation mm (inches)	88.5 (3.48)	62.7 (2.47)	63.7 (2.51)	50.7 (2.00)	48.2 (1.90)	61.1 (2.41)	49.2 (1.94)	68.2 (2.69)	75.7 (2.98)	104.2 (4.10)	98.3 (3.87)	99.2 (3.91)	870.2 (34.26)
Mean monthly sunshine hours	54.6	74.0	109.7	168.6	213.6	190.5	198.7	184.8	141.0	100.1	63.3	45.6	1,544.5
Source: Met Office

A detailed daily weather forecast for Gwbert, including sea temperature, can be found here .

== Historical remains ==
Craig y Gwbert, on the cliff edge near the Cliff Hotel, comprises the remains of a well-defended coastal promontory Iron Age fort, but no associated field systems have been found. It is only accessible via a narrow neck of land, and defended by a substantial earthen bank, measuring 2.5 m in height and 40 m in length. The entrance is a small gap through this bank. Today there are remains of lime pits within this area, together with a Grade II listed lime kiln, and the Cliff Hotel's nine-hole golf course makes use of the promontory.

In the mid-1970s a sand-covered medieval rubbish pit (3 m diameter and 1.5 m deep) was excavated in the eroding cliff-section in Coronation Drive, south-west of the present village of Gwbert. Some medieval leather shoes were recovered, as were 75 items of pottery, which has given its name to "Gwbert Ware", a variation of Dyfed Gravel-Tempered Ware, this being very gravelly without much glaze. Examples of these 13th-century pieces can be seen in Cardigan Heritage Centre. Images are available online. Other finds in the pit included animal bones including an ox scapula and a stone axe found in the loose. Excavation also revealed earlier plough soil and cattle hoof prints under the sand.

== Notable residents ==
The Rev. Caleb Morris (1800–1865), a native of Pembrokeshire who was educated at Cardigan, then moved to London in 1838 as an ordained minister, where he acquired a reputation as an eloquent and powerful speaker, and one of the leading lights of the London pulpit. During periods of physical weakness he would return to Wales to recover, but continued ill health forced him to retire early. He lived the last year of his life at Gwbert, where he died at The Lodge on 26 July 1865.

== Gallery ==
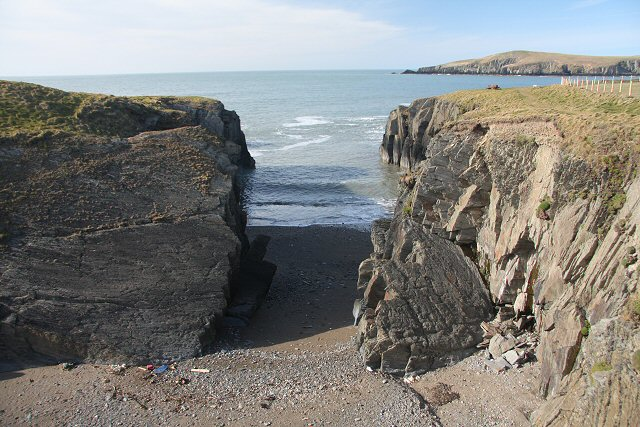
The coastline by Craig y Gwbert

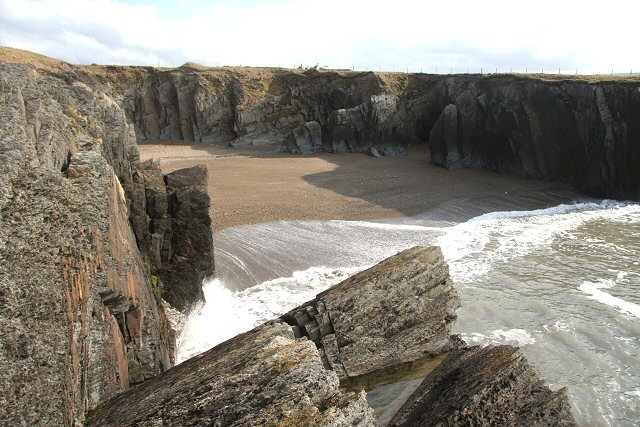
A sandy cove near Gwbert

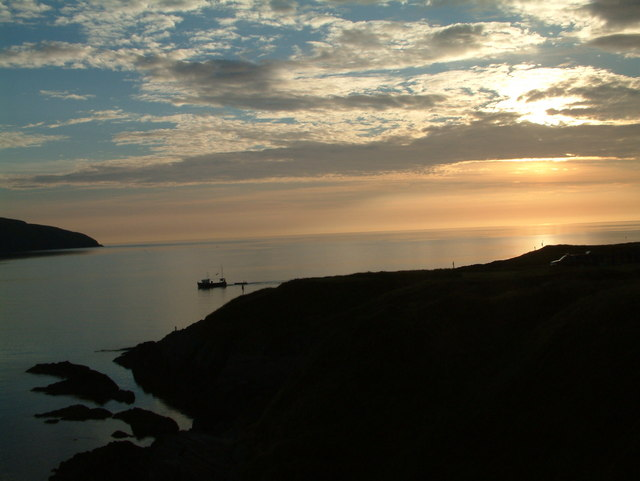
A sunset from Gwbert

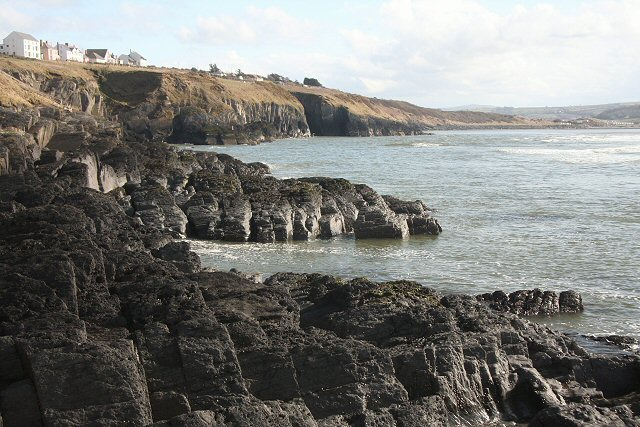
Gwbert's rocky coastline

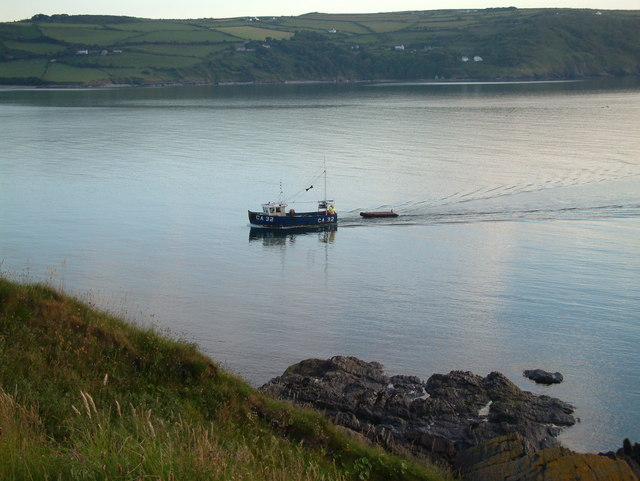
Fishing boat off Gwbert

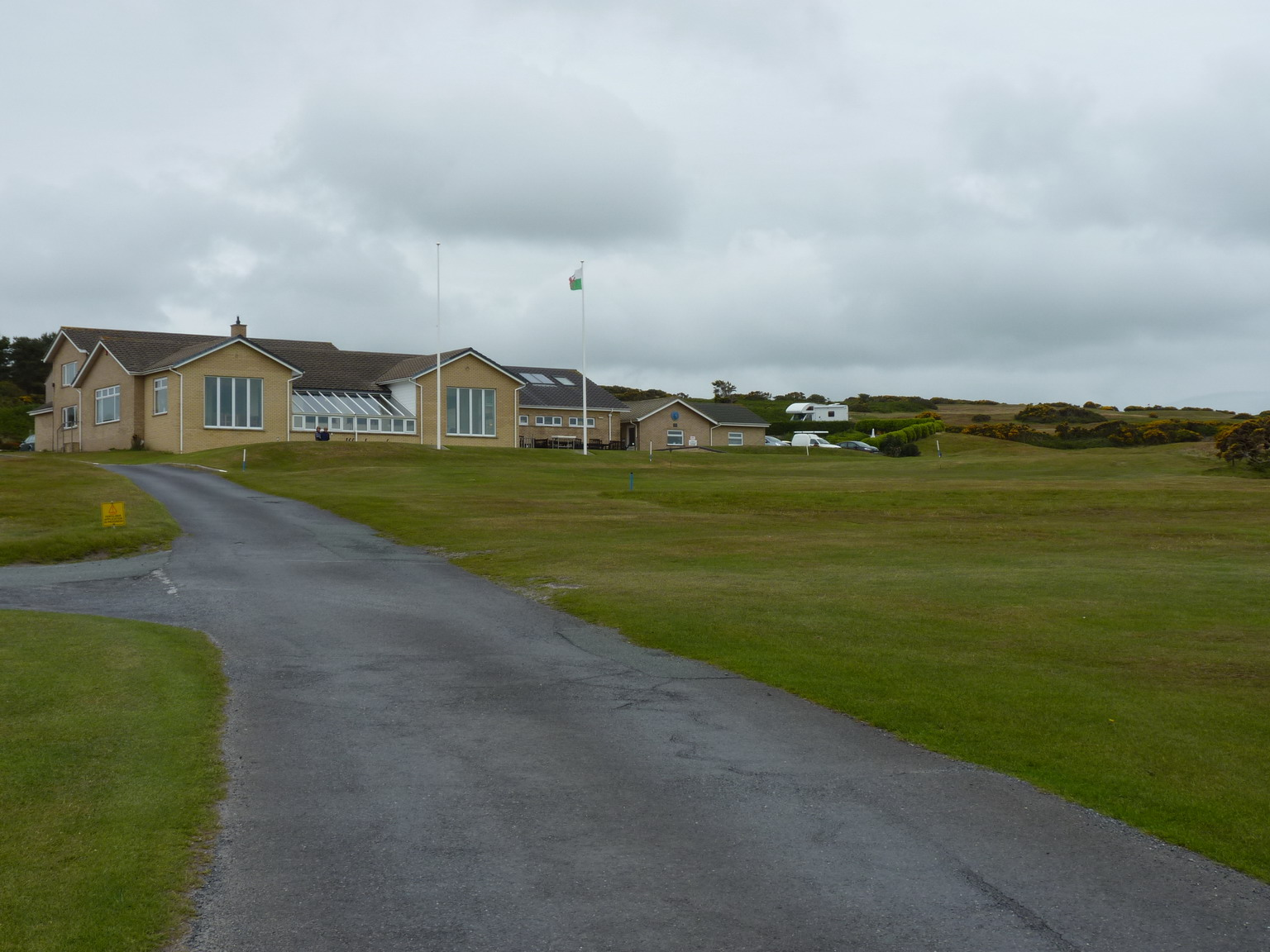
The golf-course clubhouse at Gwbert

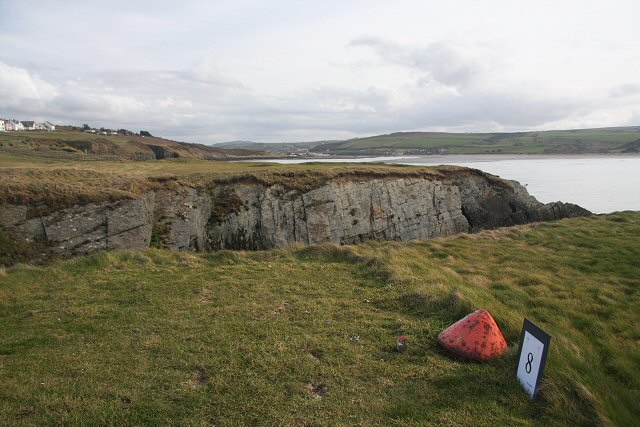
The 8th hole on Craig y Gwbert

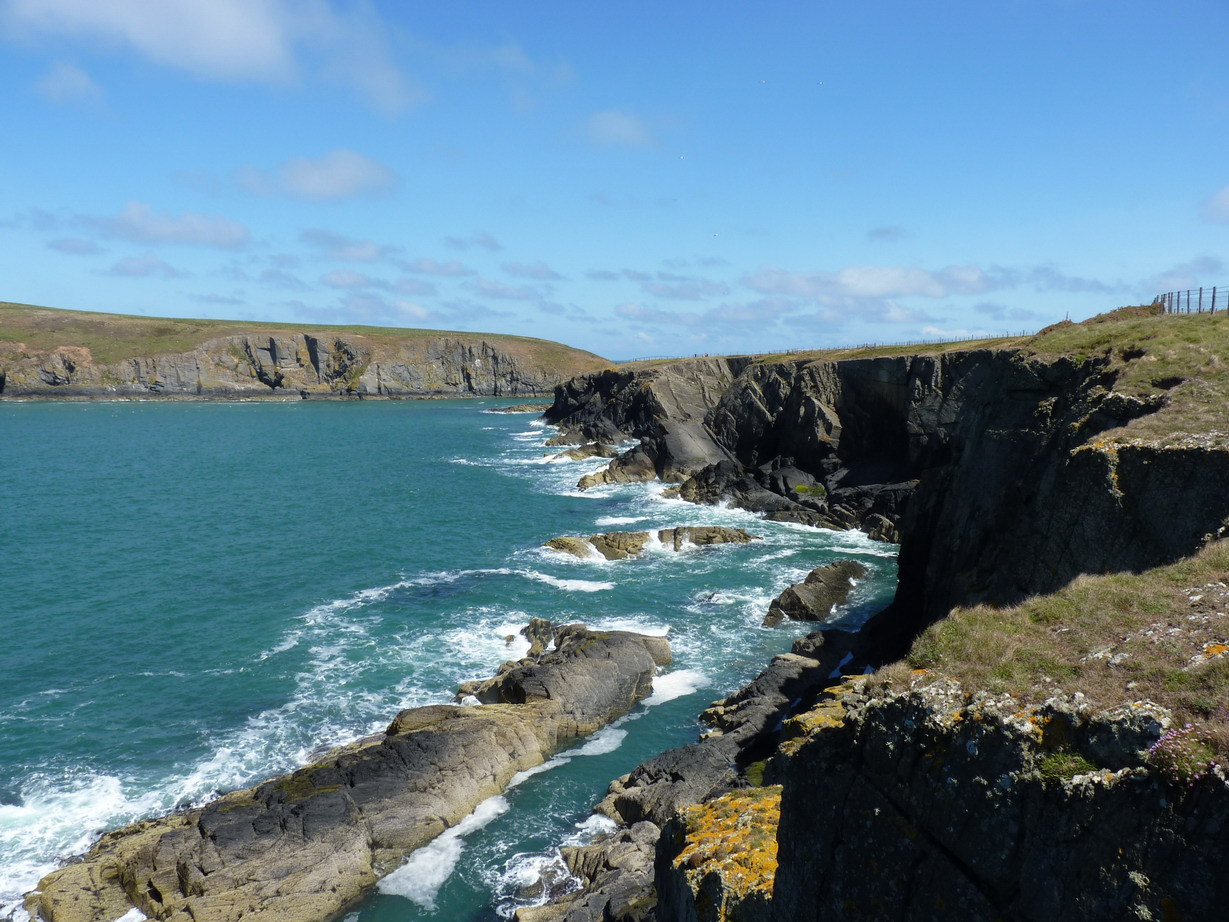
The coastline at Gwbert, looking towards Cardigan Island

== See also ==
- Cubert, a village in Cornwall also associated with the saint
