= Ceibwr Bay =

Bay in Pembrokeshire, west Wales

Coordinates: 52°04′06″N 4°44′52″W

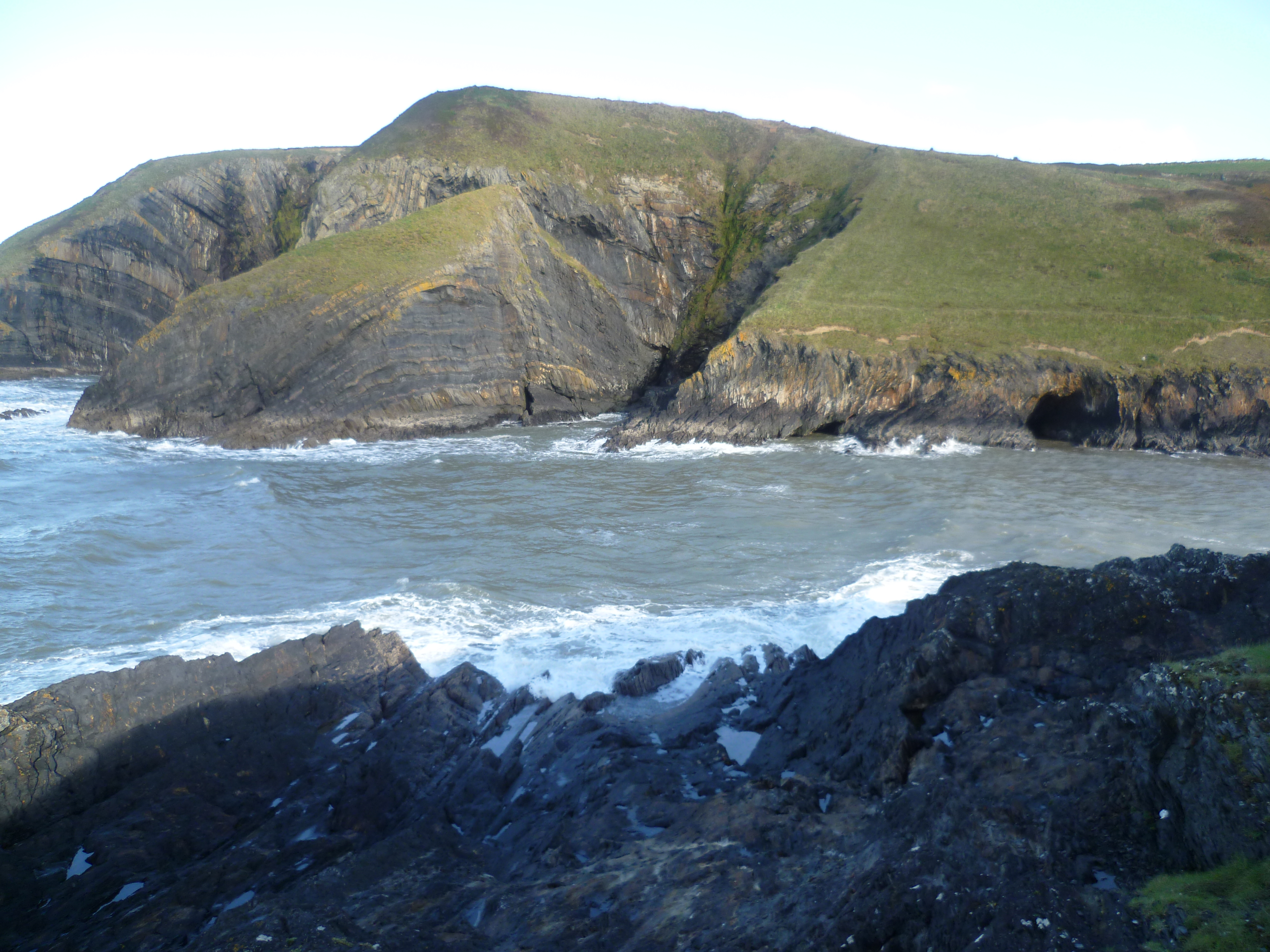
Ceibwr Bay, looking north across the entrance to Ceibwr Cove

Ceibwr Bay (Welsh: Bae Ceibwr) is a bay opening into the Irish Sea in Pembrokeshire, west Wales. It is about 7 km west of Cardigan, and 3 km south of the headland of Cemaes Head. A part of it known as the Moyle is owned by the National Trust, and lies within the Pembrokeshire Coast National Park and on the Pembrokeshire Coast Path.

== Geology ==
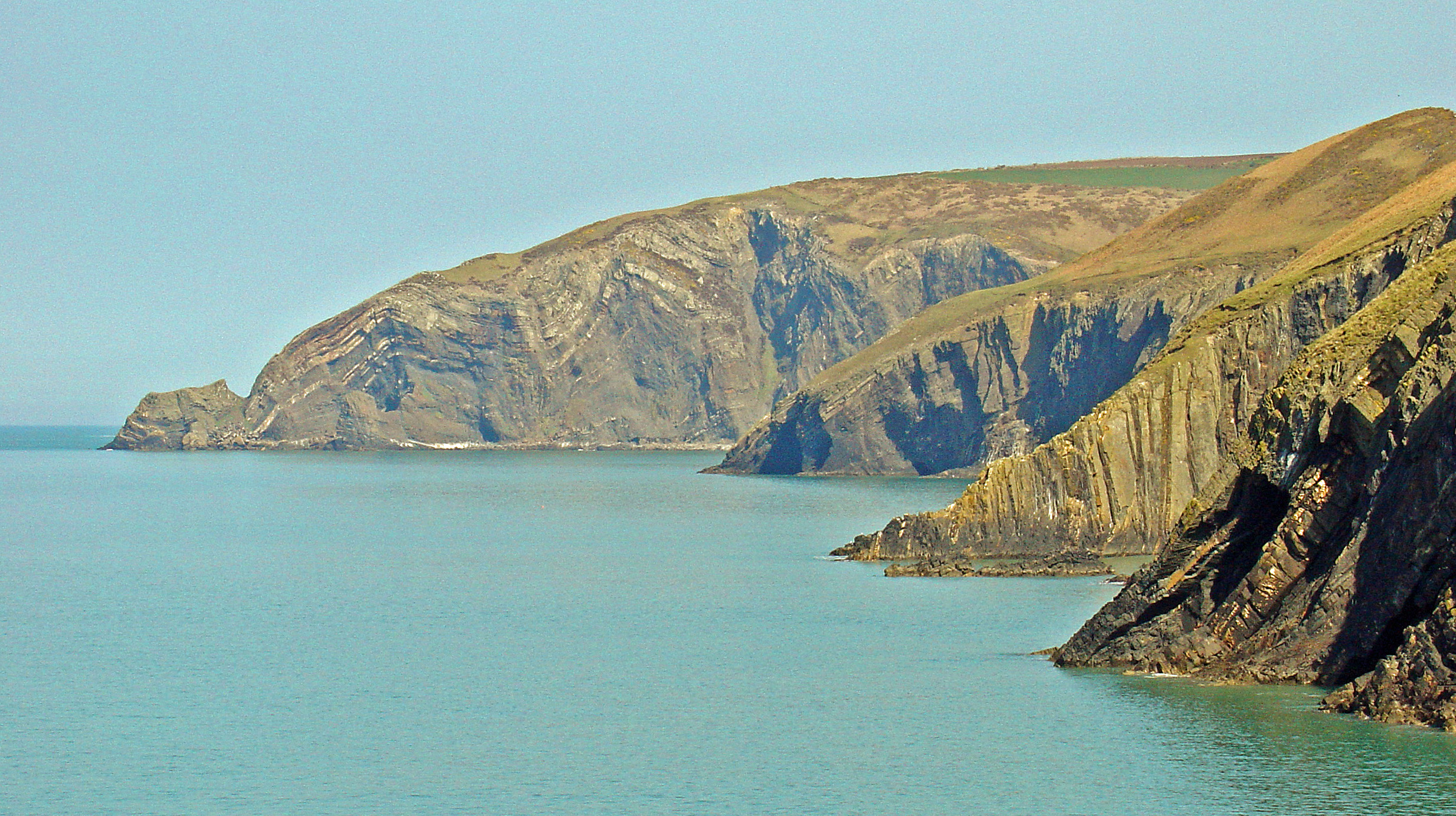
Cliffs of Penyrafr, viewed from Ceibwr Bay

The elevated landscape at Ceibwr Bay is made up of spectacular cliff folds, part of the Nant Ceibwr valley leading through the village of Moylegrove, originally formed by glacial erosion. The river runs out into the Irish Sea through Ceibwr Bay.

The Ceibwr Bay Fault is a WSW-ENE-trending fault zone, that extends from the coast at Ceibwr Bay at its western end to the coast at Aberporth at its eastern end.

== Features ==
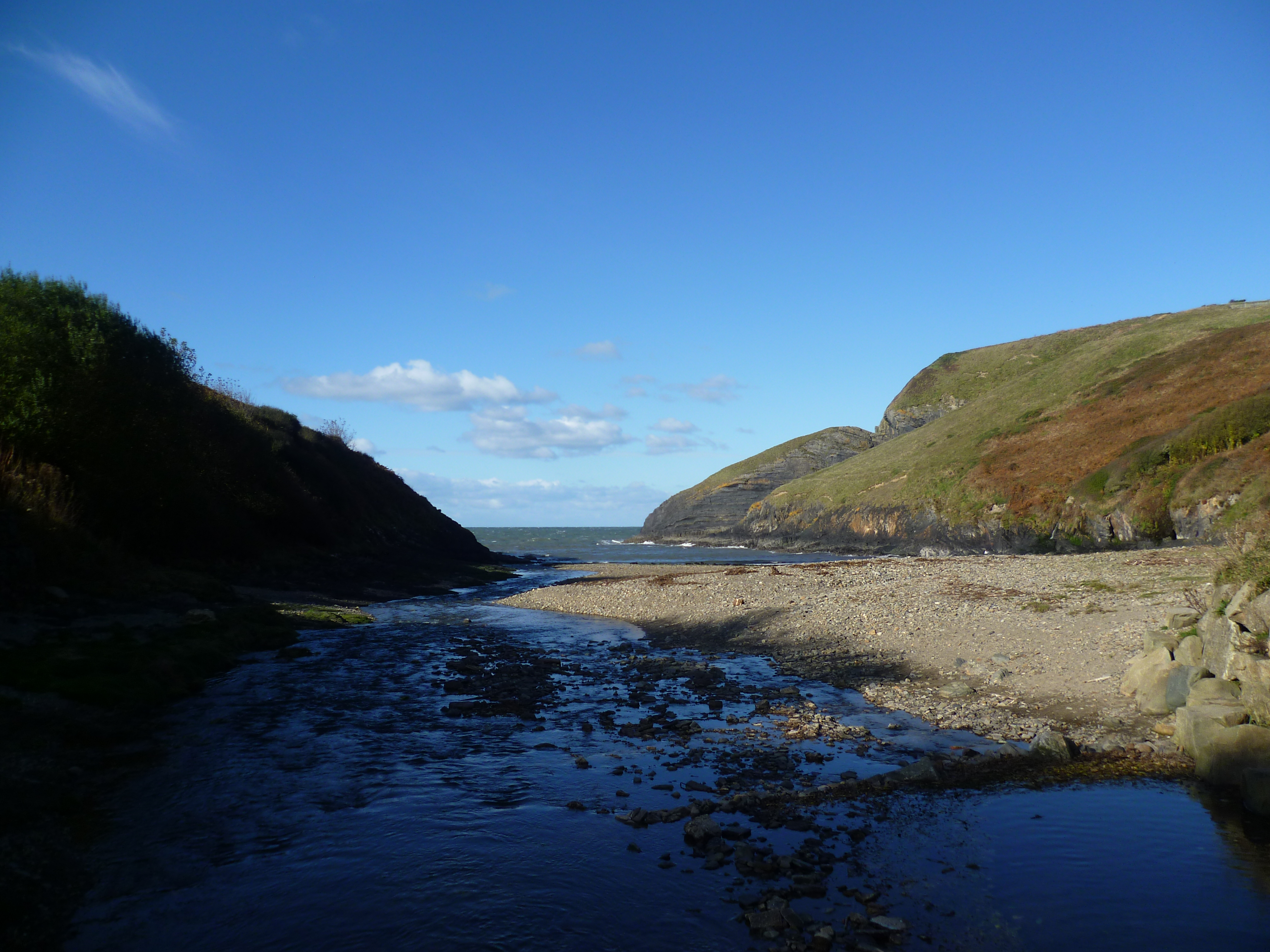
Ceibwr Cove and former harbour; Ceibwr Bay beyond

Ceibwr Bay is in the Pembrokeshire Coast National Park and is owned by the National Trust. The landscape is a significant bird habitat (gulls, fulmar, shag, cormorant and chough) and its natural environment and geological features attract nature lovers and coasteerers. Accessed by the Pembrokeshire Coast Path (part of the Wales Coast Path), its cliff-tops afford sightings of bottlenose dolphins and Atlantic grey seals.

To the south of the bay is the Witches' Cauldron (Pwll-y-wrach), a collapsed cave. Ceibwr Cove has a small stony beach beside the outflow of Nant Ceibwr and was once a port serving Moylegrove and the surrounding area.

== See also ==
- Cardigan Bay Special Area of Conservation
