= Cardigan Island =

Island in Wales

Native name: Ynys Aberteifi
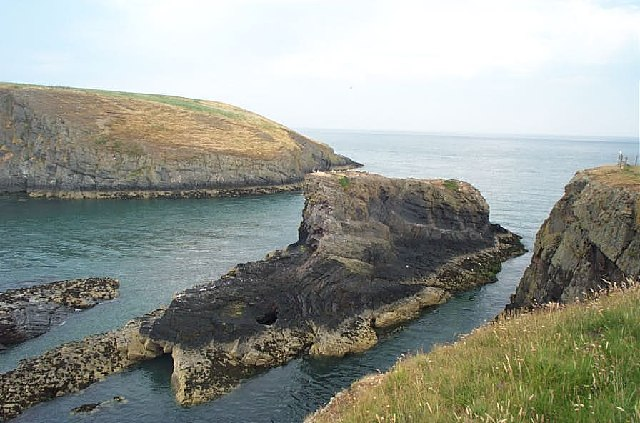
- Carreg Lydan and Cardigan Island

- Location within Wales

Geography
- Location: Cardigan, Wales
- Coordinates: 52.133331°N 4.683333°W

Administration
- Wales
- County: Ceredigion

Demographics
- Population: 0 (uninhabited)

Cardigan Island (Welsh: Ynys Aberteifi) is an uninhabited island north of Cardigan, Ceredigion, south-west Wales. It reaches a height of 52 metres (171 ft) a.s.l., and 38 acres (15 ha) in area.

Lying in the estuary of the River Teifi, it is known for having a small colony of grey seals. It is within 200 metres (220 yd) of the Welsh coastline near Gwbert. It is owned and managed by the Wildlife Trust of South and West Wales.

The island was once the home of puffins and Manx shearwater. A guide book in the 1890s referred to the puffins as “Welsh parrots”. In 1924 Welsh writer and naturalist Ronald Lockley wrote that there were probably 25 to 30 pairs on the island. However, in 1934 the liner Herefordshire, being towed to the breakers' yard, ran aground on the island in a storm, and rats made it ashore. Over a period of years they ate the eggs and chicks of nesting seabirds, and wiped out the island’s population of puffin and Manx shearwater, which have never returned. The wreck has attracted a wide variety of marine life and is a diving attraction. It was 45 years before the rat population was exterminated.

Today, birds such as guillemots, razorbills, cormorants, shags, fulmars and a variety of sea-gulls all nest on the island. Bottlenose dolphins and Atlantic grey seals are also often seen in the sea around the island.

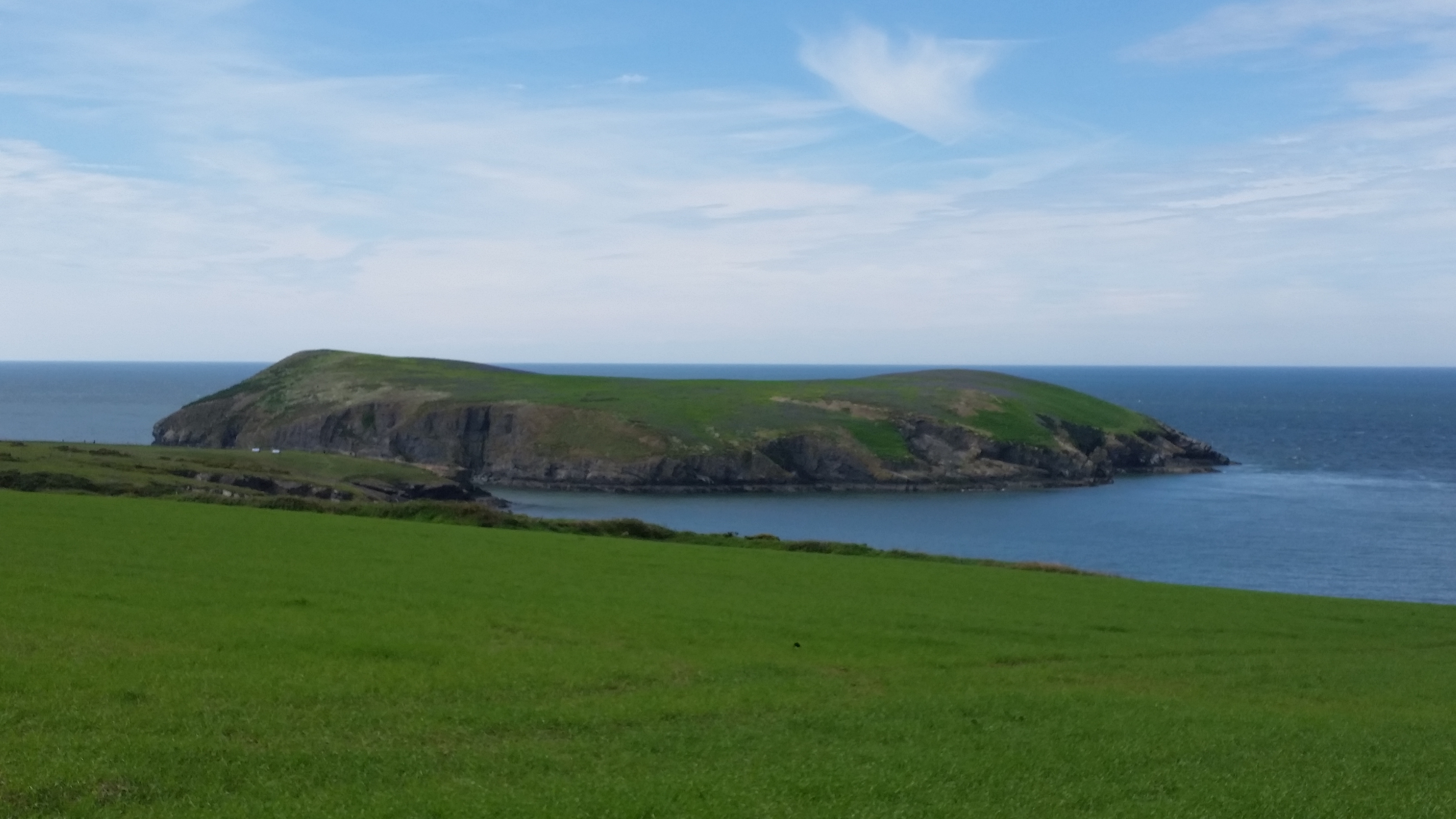
Cardigan Island as viewed from the coastal path

Map of Cardigan Island

== See also ==
- Cardigan Bay
