= Cardigan Bay =

Bay in Wales

Coordinates: 52°30′N 04°25′W

- Bae Ceredigion (Welsh)
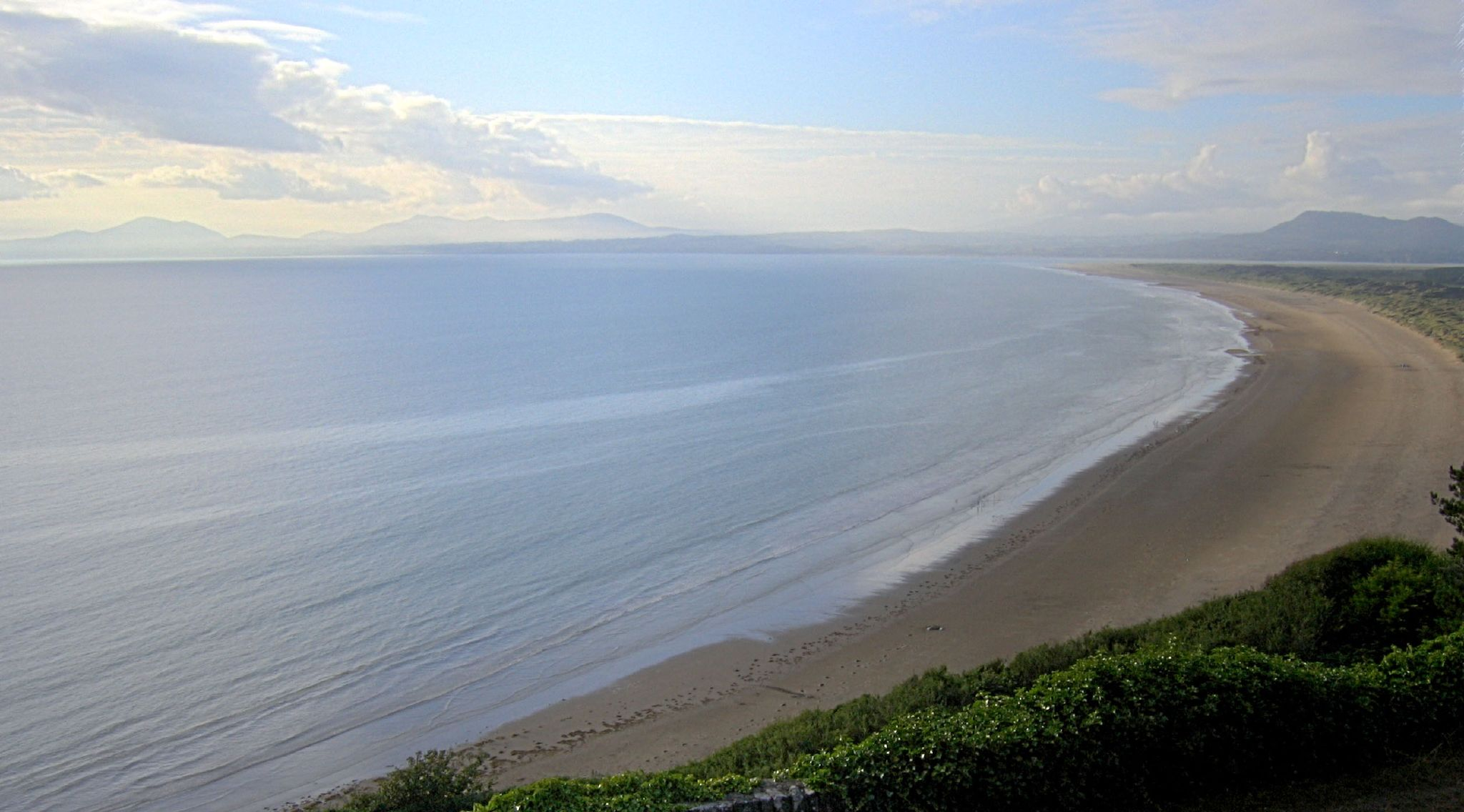
- Cardigan Bay near Harlech
- Interactive map of Cardigan Bay
- Map showing Cardigan Bay
- Location: Wales
- Type: Bay and inlet
- Etymology: Cardigan/Ceredigion
- Part of: Irish Sea
- Basin countries: United Kingdom

Cardigan Bay (Welsh: Bae Ceredigion) is a large inlet of the Irish Sea, indenting the west coast of Wales between Bardsey Island, Gwynedd in the north, and Strumble Head, Pembrokeshire at its southern end. It is the largest bay in Wales.

== Geography ==
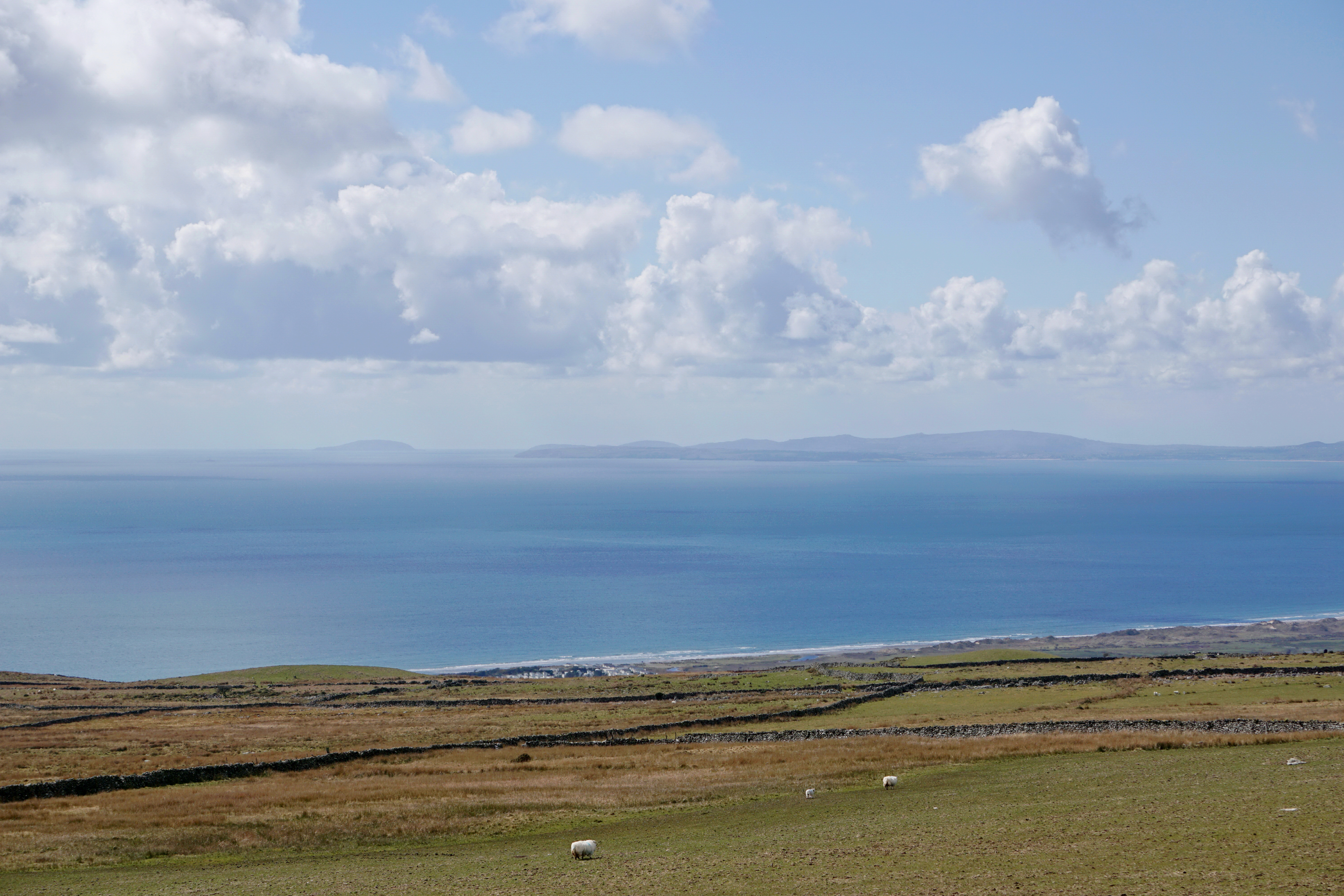
Bardsey Island and Llŷn Peninsula from Ardudwy

Cardigan Bay has numerous beaches, and marine life. Much of the coast surrounding the bay is fertile farmland, dotted with towns and seaside resorts such as Fishguard, New Quay, Aberaeron, Llanon, Aberystwyth, Borth, Aberdyfi, Tywyn, Barmouth, Porthmadog, Criccieth and Pwllheli on the Cambrian Coast. Smaller coastal villages include Cwmtydu, Nanternis and Llangrannog.

Major rivers flowing into the bay include the Glaslyn, Mawddach, Dysynni, Dyfi, Rheidol, Ystwyth, Aeron and Teifi.

== History ==
Until the early 20th century, Cardigan Bay supported a strong maritime industry. Cardigan is located at the mouth of the River Teifi; hence the Welsh name, Aberteifi (Mouth of the Teifi). At the turn of the 19th century, the heyday of the port, it was a more important port than Cardiff. At this time more than 300 ships were registered at Cardigan—seven times as many as Cardiff, and three times as many as Swansea.

The central and northern areas of the bay are the location of the legendary Cantre'r Gwaelod, the drowned "Lowland Hundred" or "Hundred under the Sea". During the winter storms of 2014, parts of the lost ancient forest of Borth, which 4,500 years ago stretched on the boggy land to Ynyslas, reappeared on the shoreline in the form of preserved exposed tree stumps. Due to climate change and rising sea levels, the forest was buried under layers of peat, sand and saltwater.

== Nature and tourism ==
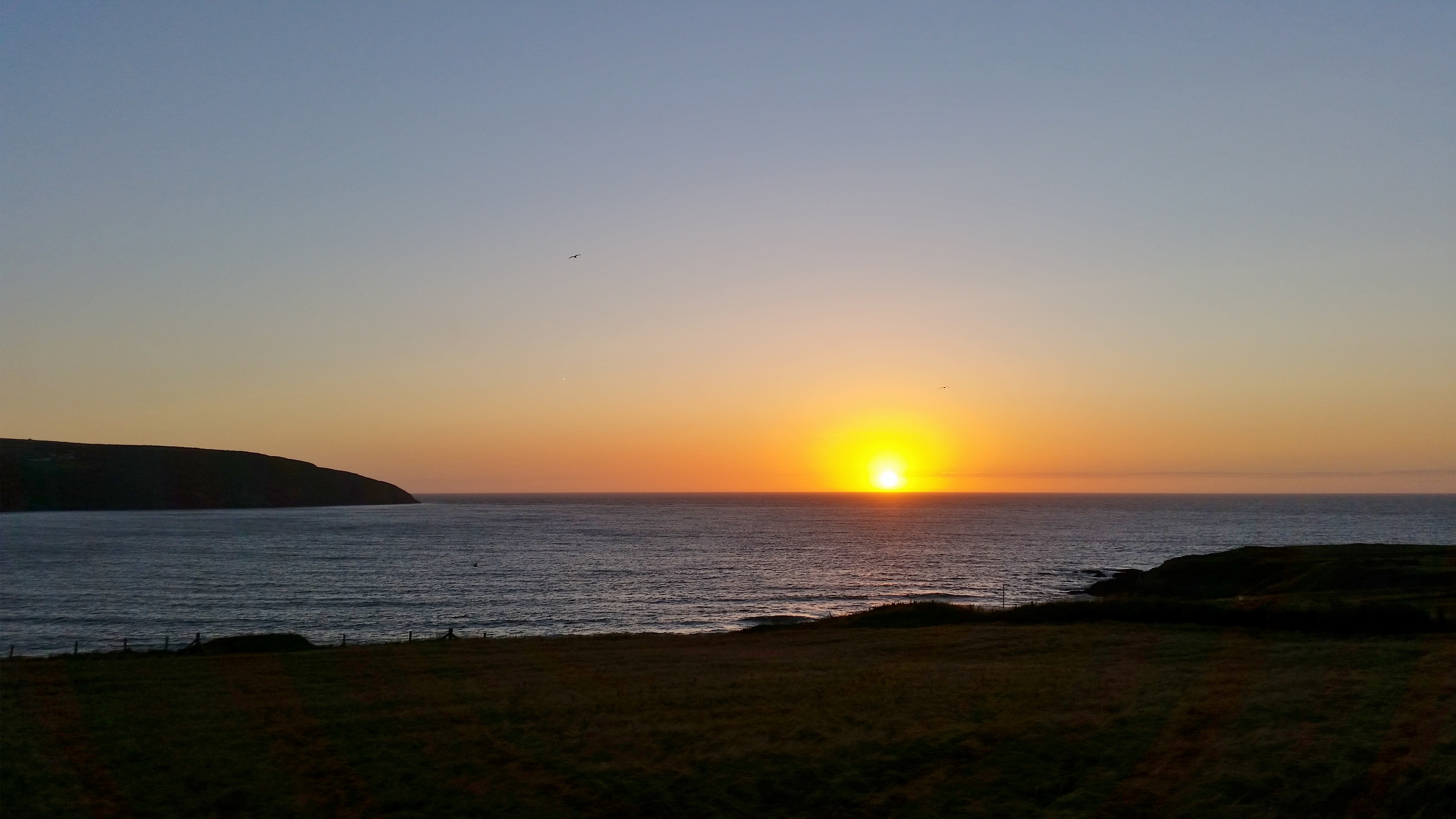
Sunset over Cardigan Bay from Gwbert

The Cardigan Bay Special Area of Conservation was set up to preserve the natural wildlife in the area, both in the sea and on the surrounding foreshore.

From the Ceredigion Coast Path it is often possible to observe the Bay's "Big Three" species of harbour porpoise, grey seals, and bottlenose dolphins, of which the bay has the largest population in the UK. Other mammals, such as minke whales, Risso's dolphins and common dolphins, together with many species of seabirds, such as puffin, and sharks, including basking sharks, can also be seen.

Since the late 1990s and early 2000s, the bay has been invaded by spider crabs. Not a seafood normally consumed by British people, since 2010 the local fishermen have supplied the Michelin-starred restaurants of Raymond Blanc.

== Military testing ==
A military testing range was first established in Cardigan Bay during the Second World War. The range is controlled from a main operating base located near Aberporth, known as MoD Aberporth. Historically, the range has played a significant part in the development and testing of a variety of military weapons.

Today the Ministry of Defence (MOD) range within Cardigan Bay provides a large secure safety area for the testing of air launched weapons and unmanned aerial systems. The range is a significant employer in the West Wales area, employing some 200 people who work in direct support of the range operation.

The Range Danger Area covers some 6,500 km^{2} (2,500 sq mi) of Cardigan Bay from sea level to unlimited height. To supplement the safe operation of the range, there are a number of small outposts located on the edge of Cardigan Bay and the Llŷn Peninsula. These outposts contain equipment that enables the range to effectively assess the performance of weapons.

Qinetiq operates the Cardigan Bay/Aberporth Range on behalf of the MOD under the terms of a Long Term Partnering Agreement. The purpose of the agreement is to deliver defence test, evaluation and training support services to ensure air launched weapon systems, associated sub-systems and UAS are safe and fit for purpose.

== See also ==
- Cemaes Head
