= St Cwyfan's Church, Llangwyfan =

Coordinates: 53.1855°N 4.4919°W

St Cwyfan's Church
- Eglwys Cwyfan (Welsh)
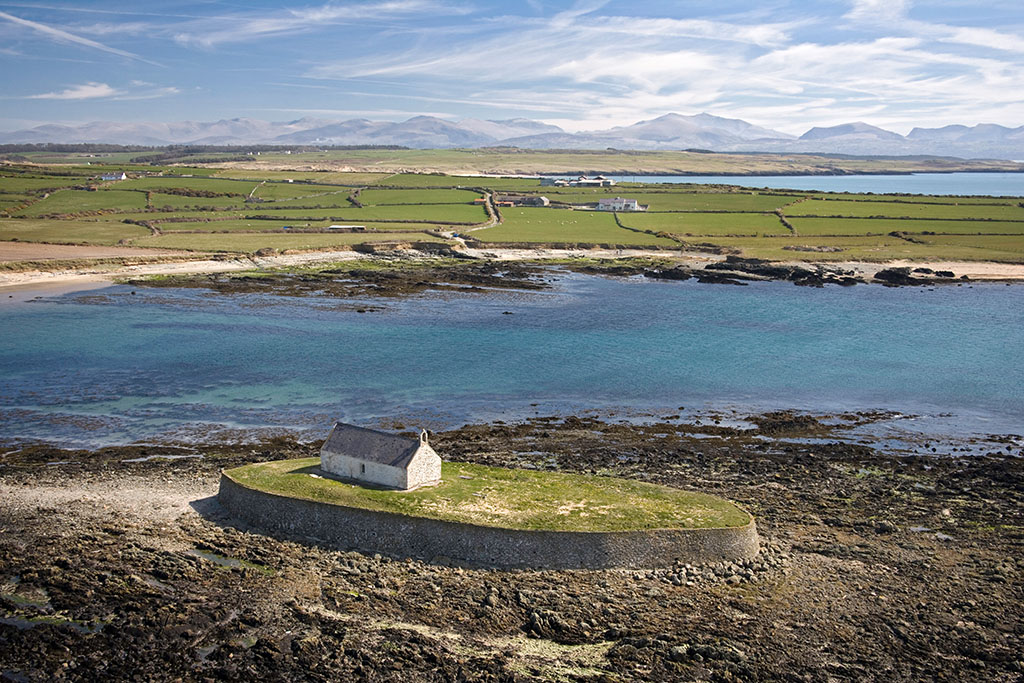
- St Cwyfan's Church
- Country: Wales
- Denomination: Church in Wales

Architecture
- Heritage designation: Grade II*
- Architectural type: Church
- Style: Medieval

St Cwyfan's Church (Welsh: Eglwys Cwyfan) is a Grade II*-listed medieval church in Aberffraw, Anglesey, Wales. Located on the small tidal island of Cribinau, it is popularly known as the "Little Church in the Sea" (or Eglwys fach y môr in Welsh). The church dates from the 12th century, with some renovations made in the 19th century.

== History and architecture ==
Dating from the 12th century, St Cwyfan's Church is dedicated to Saint Kevin, who founded the monastery at Glendalough in County Wicklow, Ireland. The church originally stood at the end of a peninsula between two bays, Porth Cwyfan and Porth China. In later years the sea slowly eroded around the coast in the two bays, therefore the peninsula was cut off, turning Cribinau into a small tidal island. As a consequence, a causeway was built to the island to allow the local population to get to the church.

In 1766 the Bishop of Bangor appointed Thomas Bowles as the parish priest of Trefdraeth, which included St Cwyfan's Church. Bowles spoke no Welsh, and only five of the 500 church-goers understood English. As a result, they protested against his appointment and the case was heard in an ecclesiastical court in 1773. The judge ruled that Welsh-speaking priests should be sent to primarily Welsh-speaking parishes.

The waves continued to erode Cribinau until the late 19th century, when some of the graves surrounding the church began to fall into the sea. During this time the church fell into disrepair; the walls became disused and roofless, and the church was consequently replaced by a new building further inland in Llangwyfan. However, in 1893 a local architect, Harold Hughes, raised money to save the church by constructing a seawall around the Cribinau, and for the restoration of the building.

== Current use ==
The church remains in use and is popular for weddings and baptisms.

== Welsh language controversy ==
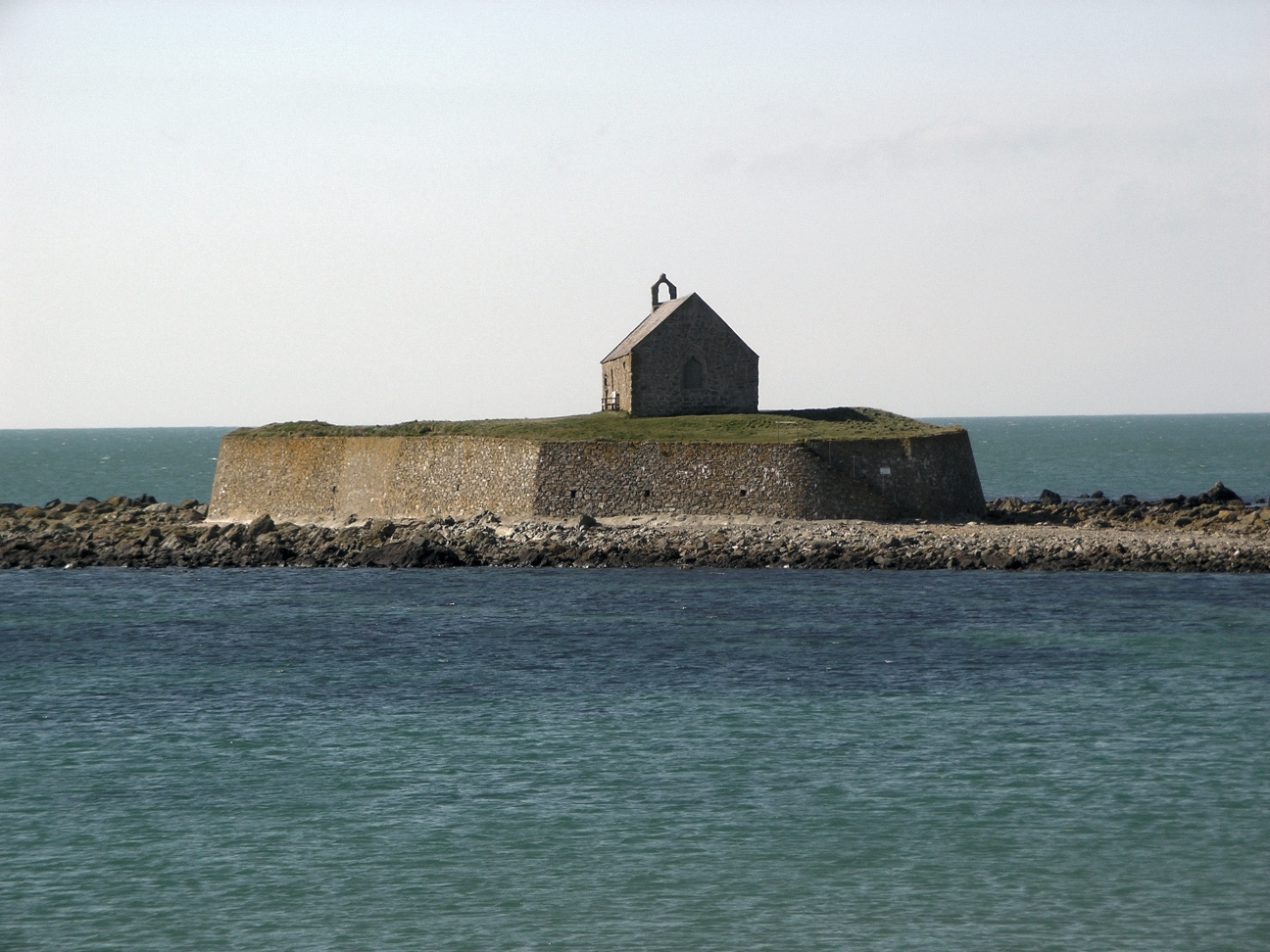
Cribinau and its church

By 1766 St Cwyfan, Llangwyfan was a chapelry of the parish of St Beuno, Trefdraeth. In that year John Egerton, Bishop of Bangor, appointed an elderly English priest, Dr Thomas Bowles, to the parish and chapelry. Between them the parish and chapelry had about 500 parishioners, of whom all but five spoke only Welsh, whereas Bowles spoke only English.

The parishioners and churchwardens of Trefdraeth petitioned against Bowles's appointment, with the Honourable Society of Cymmrodorion supporting and helping to fund their case. The Court of Arches heard evidence in the case in May 1770 but did not hear the prosecution and defence arguments until January 1773.

The prosecution argued that Bowles's inability to minister in Welsh contravened Article XXV of the Articles of Religion, the Act for the Translation of the Scriptures into Welsh 1563 and the Act of Uniformity 1662. The defence argued that the prosecution would have to prove that Bowles was totally incapable of speaking any Welsh at all, and even if they did so Bowles had lawfully been granted the ecclesiastical freehold and therefore could not be deprived of it.

The case was judged by the Dean of the Arches, George Hay. In January 1773 he ruled that only clergy who could speak Welsh should be appointed to Welsh-speaking parishes, and Bowles should not have been appointed, but he now held the ecclesiastical freehold of the benefice and the case to deprive him of it had not been proved. He therefore let Bowles stay in post, which he did until he died in November of that year. Bowles was then replaced in the parish and chapelry with Richard Griffith, a priest who spoke Welsh.
