= Christianity in Wales =

Representing 43.6% of the Welsh population in 2021, Christianity is the largest religion in Wales. Wales has a strong tradition of nonconformism, particularly Methodism. From 1534 until 1920 the established church was the Church of England, but this was disestablished in Wales in 1920, becoming the still Anglican but self-governing Church in Wales.

Most adherents to organised religion in Wales follow the Anglican Church in Wales, Presbyterian Church of Wales, Baptist Union of Wales, Union of Welsh Independents, Methodist, Catholic and Eastern Orthodox churches.

== History ==
=== Celtic Christianity ===
Nearly 200 years before Constantine, Saint Lucius, a legendary 2nd-century King of the Britons (or Silures) is traditionally credited with introducing Christianity into Britain in the tenure of Pope Eleutherius (c. 180), although this is disputed. Christianity certainly arrived in Wales sometime in the Roman occupation, but it was initially suppressed. The first Christian martyrs in Wales, Julius and Aaron, were killed at Isca Augusta (Caerleon) in south Wales in about AD 304. The earliest Christian object found in Wales is a vessel with a Chi-Rho symbol found at the nearby town of Venta Silurum (Caerwent). By the end of the 4th century, Christianity became the sole official religion of the Roman Empire. Wales was the birthplace of Pelagius, noted theologian and contemporary of Augustine of Hippo.

As the Roman legions garrisoned in Wales withdrew in the early 5th century, Britain was invaded by tribes including the Angles and Saxons who later became the Anglo-Saxons. They were unable to make inroads into Wales except possibly along the Severn Valley as far as Llanidloes, but they gradually conquered eastern and southern Britain, which would eventually become known as England. The writer Gildas drew sharp contrasts between the Christian Welsh at this time and the pagan Anglo-Saxon invaders, although at the same time lamenting the shortcomings of Welsh Christians.

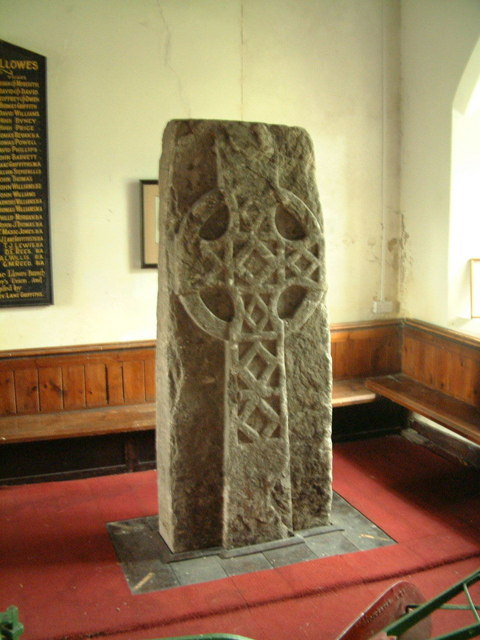
St. Meilig's Cross, Llowes, Powys. One side of this 'Celtic cross' was carved in the 7th century and the other side was carved in the 11th century.

=== Emergence and Reformation ===
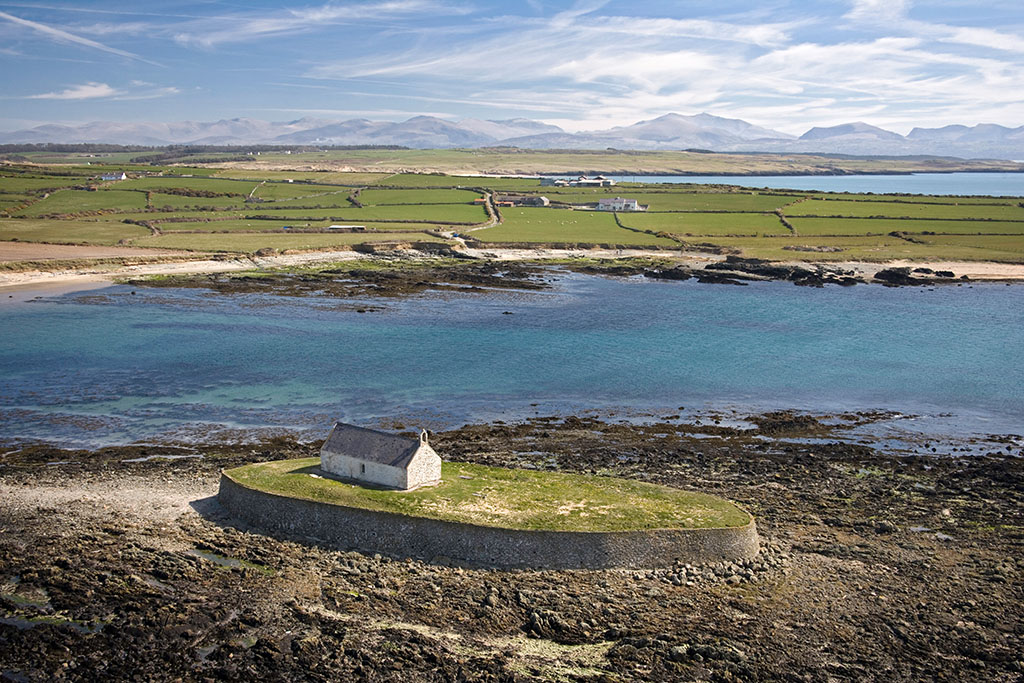
12c St Cwyfan's Church, Llangwyfan

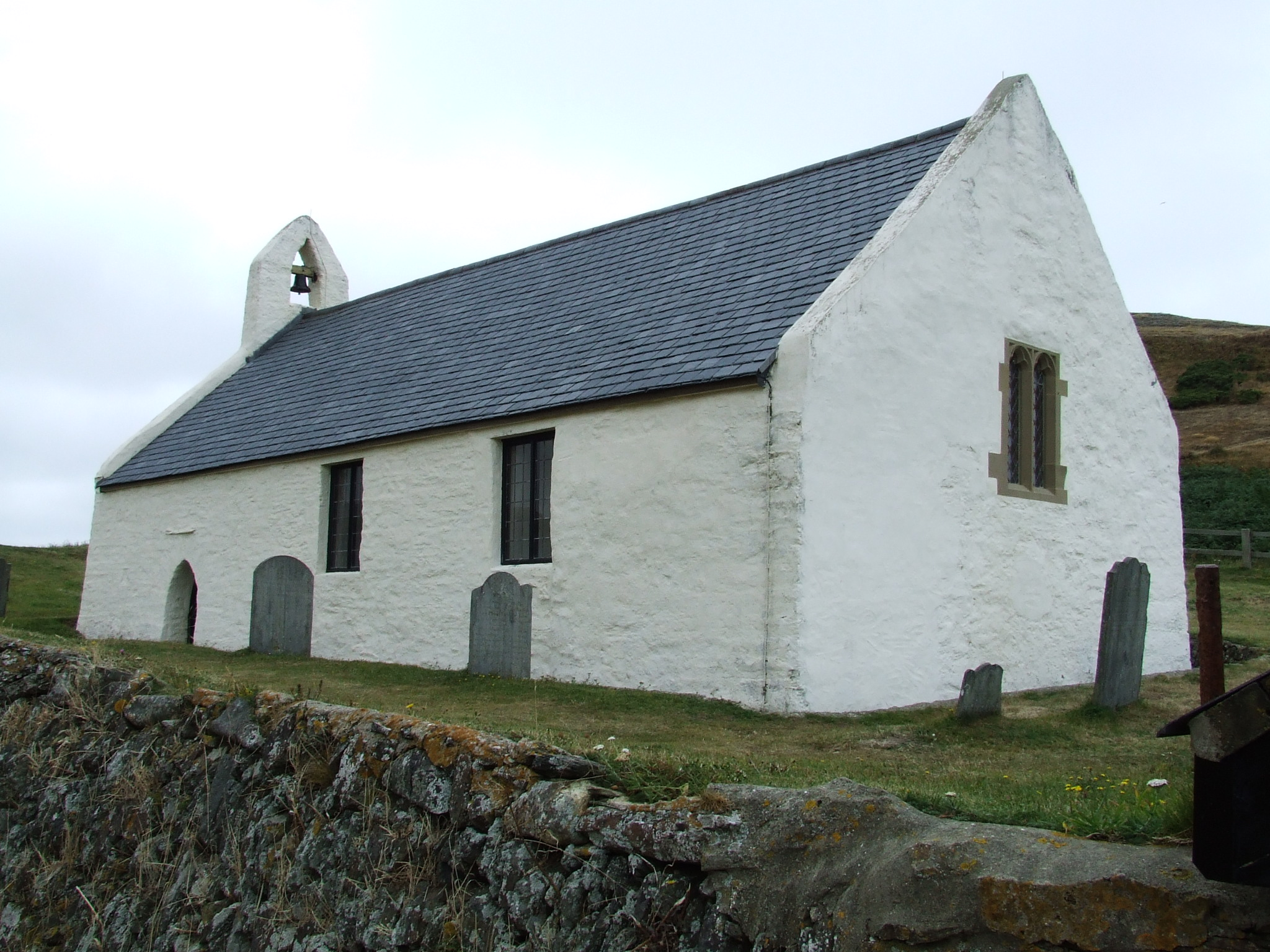
Eglwys-y-Grog, a 13th-century church in Mwnt, Ceredigion

The Age of the Saints in the 6th and 7th centuries was marked by the establishment of monastic settlements throughout the country, by religious leaders such as David, Illtud, Padarn, and Teilo. This was the period when the Welsh developed a shared national identity, arising from their language and religious beliefs. Welsh bishops refused to co-operate with Augustine's mission to the Anglo-Saxons. However, a combination of Celtic Christianity's reconciliation with Rome and conquest of Wales by Edward I meant that from the Middle Ages until 1920, the Welsh dioceses were part of the Province of Canterbury – in communion with Rome until the Reformation.

This participation in the Province of Canterbury continued afterwards as part of the Church of England. During the reign of Henry VIII, Wales had been legally incorporated into the realm of the Kingdom of England and the Established Church in Wales was the Church of England. Some books of the Bible and of the Apocrypha had been translated in the Middle Ages, but the Laws in Wales Acts 1535 and 1542 passed under Henry VIII effectively banned the Welsh language from official use. However, under Elizabeth I, Parliament passed An Act for the Translating of the Bible and the Divine Service into the Welsh Tongue 1563. In 1567, William Salesbury, Richard Davies and Thomas Huet completed the first modern translation of the New Testament and the first translation of the Book of Common Prayer (Welsh: Y Llyfr Gweddi Gyffredin). Then in 1588 William Morgan completed a translation of the whole Bible. These translations were important to the survival of the Welsh language through the effect of conferring status on Welsh as a liturgical language and vehicle for worship. This had a significant role in its continued use as a means of everyday communication and as a literary language down to the present day despite the increasing use of English.

Bishop Richard Davies and dissident Protestant cleric John Penry introduced Calvinist theology to Wales. They used the model of the Synod of Dort of 1618-1619. Calvinism developed through the Puritan period, following the restoration of the monarchy under Charles II, and within Wales' Methodist movement. However few copies of Calvin's works were available before the mid-19th century. A major point of contention among Welsh Christians were that English bishops were routinely granted benefices in Welsh-speaking areas despite being unable to speak Welsh. This contravened Article XXIV of the Articles of Religion of the Church of England:

It is a thing plainly repugnant to the Word of God, and the custom of the Primitive Church, to have publick Prayer in the Church, or to minister the Sacraments in a tongue not understanded of the people.

In 1766, the churchwardens of the parish of St Beuno, Trefdraeth on Anglesey, supported by the Cymmrodorion, began a test case against the English clergyman Thomas Bowles, who could not conduct services in Welsh and whose attempt to do so had ended in ridicule. In its verdict in 1773 the Court of Arches refused to deprive Dr Bowles of his living, but did lay down the principle that clergy should be examined and found proficient in Welsh in order to be considered for Welsh-speaking parishes.

=== Nonconformity and revivals ===
Nonconformity was a significant influence in Wales from the eighteenth to the twentieth centuries. The Welsh Methodist revival of the 18th century was one of the most significant religious and social movements in the history of Wales. The revival began within the Church of England in Wales and at the beginning remained as a group within it, but the Welsh revival differed from the Methodist revival in England in that its theology was Calvinist rather than Arminian. Welsh Methodists gradually built up their own networks, structures, and even meeting houses (or chapels), which led eventually to the secession of 1811 and the formal establishment of the Calvinistic Methodist Church in 1823 (later renamed the Presbyterian Church of Wales in 1923).

The Welsh Methodist revival also had an influence on the older nonconformist churches, or dissenters – the Baptists and the Congregationalists – who in turn also experienced growth and renewal. As a result, by the middle of the nineteenth century, Wales was predominantly a nonconformist country.

The 1904–1905 Welsh Revival was the largest full scale Christian revival in Wales in the 20th century. It is believed that at least 100,000 people became Christians during the 1904–1905 revival, but despite this it did not put a stop to the gradual decline of Christianity in Wales, only holding it back slightly.

=== Disestablishment ===
The Welsh Church Act 1914 provided for the separation of the four dioceses of the Church of England located in Wales (known collectively as the Church in Wales) from the rest of the Church, and for the simultaneous disestablishment of the Church. The Act came into operation in 1920. Since then there has been no established church in Wales. In 2008, the Church in Wales narrowly rejected a proposal to allow women to become bishops. In 2018, research conducted by YouGov found that 56% of Christians in Wales identify as members of the Church in Wales.

== Catholicism ==
Catholics are served by the Ecclesiastical Province of Cardiff, which exists out of the Archdiocese of Cardiff, the Diocese of Menevia and the Diocese of Wrexham. The bishops of these dioceses are part of the Catholic Bishops' Conference of England and Wales. In total, the three dioceses counted 209,451 Catholics on a population of 3,112,451 inhabitants, equalling to a percentage of 6.7% Catholics. The three dioceses have 172 priests and 34 permanent deacons, 75 male religious and 267 female religious, and a total of 154 parishes as of 2016 (2017 for the diocese of Wrexham). However, the province is not completely equal to Wales, as the Archdiocese of Cardiff also covers Herefordshire, in England. In 2018, YouGov found that 17% of Christians in Wales identified as Catholic.

== Sabbatarianism ==
The Sabbatarian temperance movement was strong among the Welsh in the Victorian period and the early twentieth century, the sale of alcohol being prohibited on Sundays in Wales by the Sunday Closing (Wales) Act 1881 – the first legislation specifically issued for Wales since the Middle Ages. From the early 1960s, local council areas were permitted to hold referendums every seven years to determine whether they should be wet or dry on Sundays: most of the industrialised areas in the east and south went wet immediately, and by the 1980s the last district, Dwyfor in the northwest, went wet; since then there have been no more Sunday-closing referendums.

== Saints ==
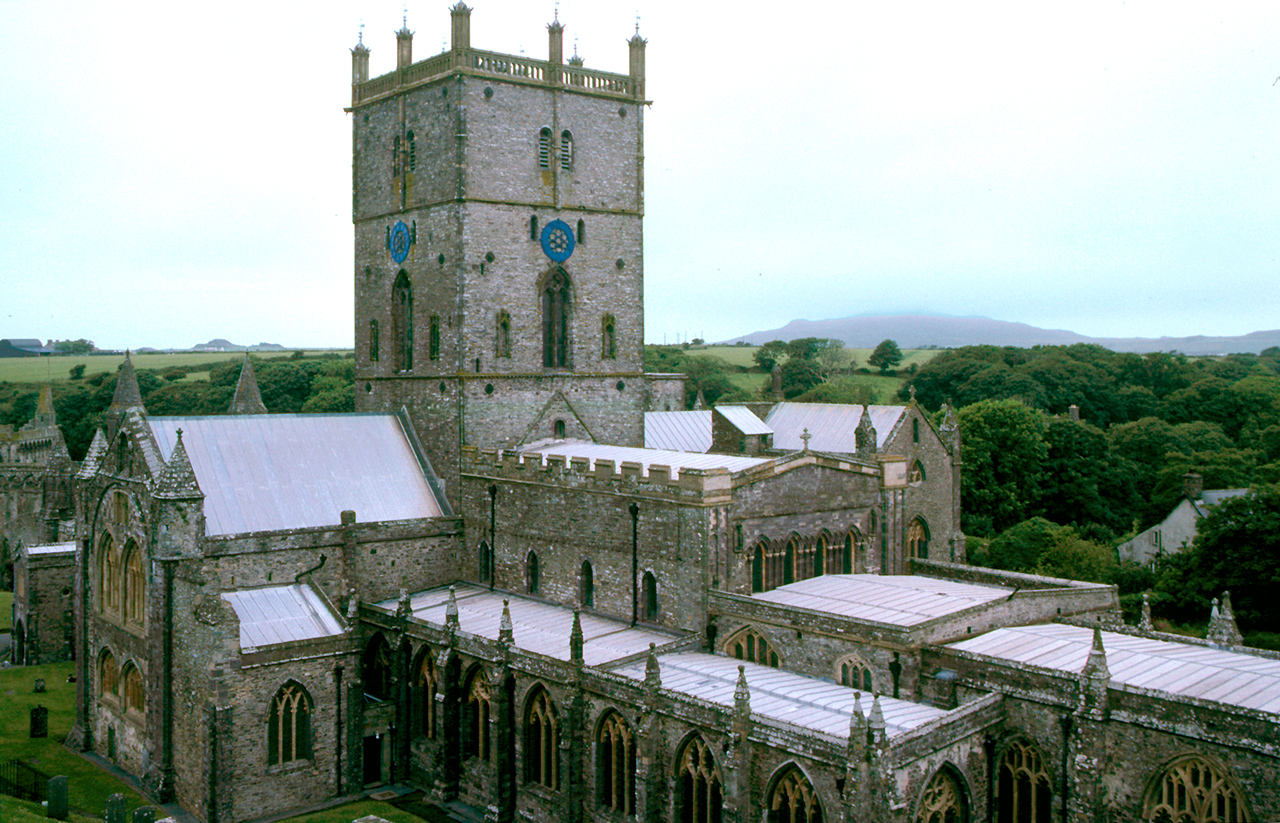
A monastic community was founded by Saint David at what is now St Davids. The present building of St Davids Cathedral was started in 1181.

Saint David is the patron saint of Wales.

Wales is particularly noted for naming places after either local or well-known saints – many or perhaps most places beginning in llan "church", e.g. Llanbedr – St Peter (Pedr); Llanfair – St Mary (Mair); Llanfihangel – St Michael (Mihangel); Llanarmon – St. Garmon. Because of the relatively small number of saints' names used, places names are often suffixed by their locality e.g. Llanfihangel Glyn Myfyr, Llanfihangel y Creuddyn, Llanfihangel-y-Pennant.

== Demographics ==
Christians in Wales by Ethnic group and Nationality
Ethnic group	2001		2011		2021	
Ethnic group	Number	%	Number	%	Number	%
White	2,069,815	99.16	1,722,299	97.67	1,302,740	96.16
– British	2,029,807	97.25	1,671,285	94.78	1,240,964	91.60
– Irish	14,710	0.70	10,647	0.60	8,696	0.64
– Irish Traveller			1,794	0.10	2,218	0.16
– Roma					1,217	0.09
– Other White	25,298	1.21	38,673	2.19	49,645	3.66
Mixed	8,924	0.43	13,521	0.77	15,958	1.18
– White and Asian	2,206	0.11	3,192	0.18	3,883	0.29
– White and Black Caribbean	3,526	0.17	5,198	0.29	4,562	0.34
– White and Black African	1,306	0.06	2,248	0.13	3,453	0.25
– Other Mixed	1,886	0.09	2,883	0.16	4,060	0.30
Asian	2,938	0.14	14,220	0.81	15,861	1.17
– Indian	776	0.04	4,192	0.24	5,247	0.39
– Chinese	1,226	0.06	2,476	0.14	2,267	0.17
– Pakistani	373	0.02	390	0.02	374	0.03
– Bangladeshi	63	<0.01	172	0.01	101	0.01
– Other Asian	500	0.02	6,990	0.40	7,872	0.58
Black	3,842	0.18	10,808	0.61	15,390	1.14
– Caribbean	1,662	0.08	2,513	0.14	2,260	0.17
– African	1,810	0.09	7,406	0.42	10,864	0.80
– Other Black	370	0.02	889	0.05	2,266	0.17
Other	1,723	0.08	2,351	0.13	4,824	0.36
– Arab			683	0.04	393	0.03
– Other Ethnic group	1,723	0.08	1,668	0.09	4,431	0.33
TOTAL	2,087,242	100.0	1,763,299	100.0	1,354,773	100.0

== See also ==
- Christianity in Cornwall
