= Vincent Evans (journalist) =

Prominent figure in Welsh associations

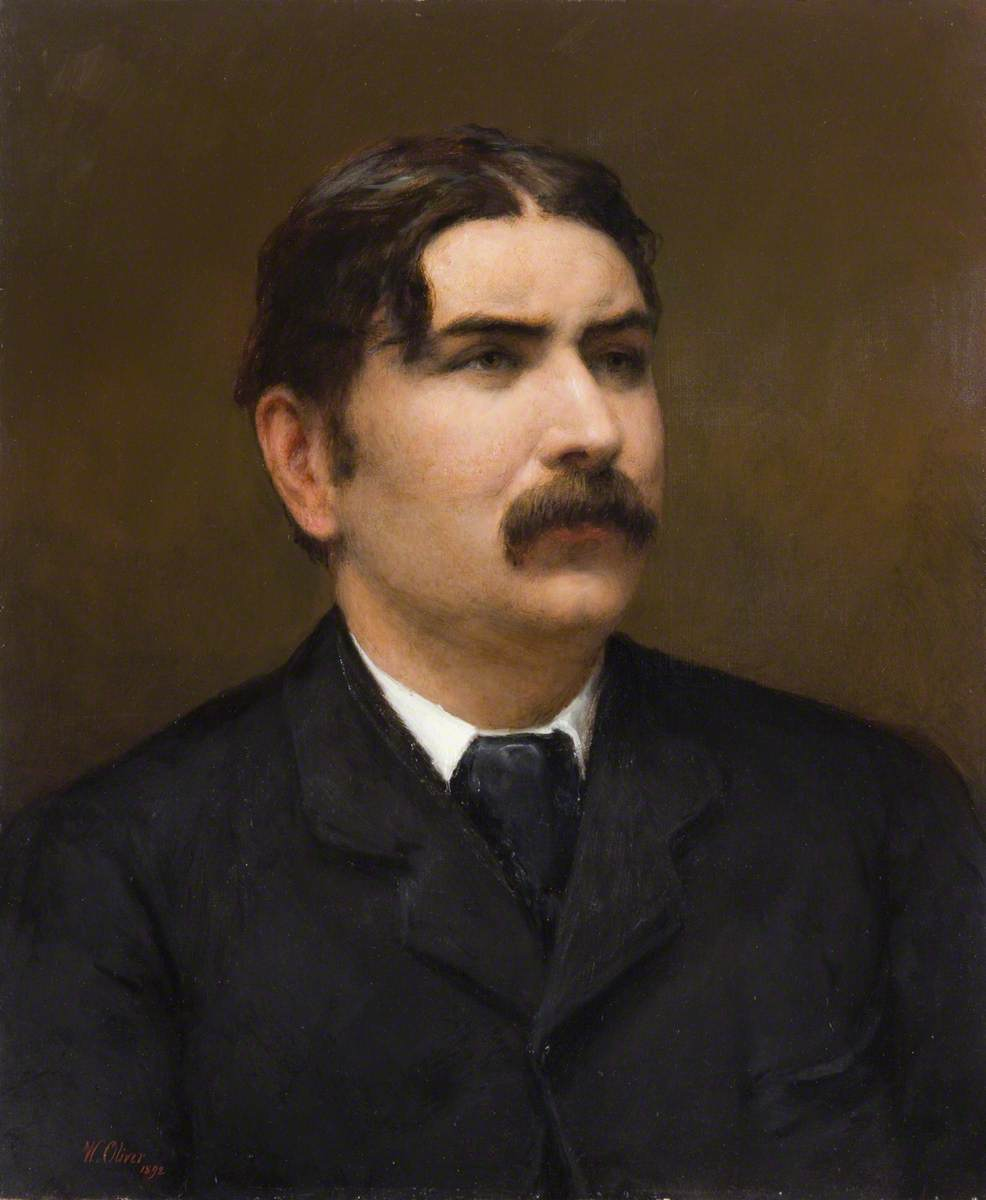
Syr Evan Vincent Evans (1851-1934)

Sir Evan Vincent Evans, CH (1851–1934) was a Welsh journalist and promoter of the Welsh national revival.

== Biography ==
Evans was born at Nantcol in the parish of Llangelynnin, Merioneth, the elder son of Lewis Evans, farmer, who removed in 1856 to Tynllyn, Trawsfynydd, in the same county, by his first wife. The registration of the birth cannot be traced. He was for some years a pupil teacher in the national school at Trawsfynydd and later an assistant in the village store. In 1872 he removed to London, where he remained until his death. Some clerical employment brought him into touch with the Chancery Lane Safe Deposit and Offices Company, Limited, the service of which he entered, becoming first secretary and then managing director. He was attracted to journalism, becoming a member of the parliamentary press gallery, and he continued throughout his life his connexion with the press and particularly with the South Wales Daily News, for the London letter of which he was for many years largely responsible. He was intimate with the younger members of parliament from Wales and welcomed the advent of his neighbour David Lloyd George to London on his election as Member of Parliament for Carnarvon Boroughs in 1890.

In 1881 Evans became secretary and editor of the publications of the National Eisteddfod Association and in 1884 a member of the Honourable Society of Cymmrodorion, the council of which he joined in 1886. He became secretary in 1887, and later undertook the editorship of the society's publications and may be said to have re-established the society. He retained his offices in both these institutions until his death.

The strong national feeling which manifested itself in Wales during the last two decades of the nineteenth century looked to the ‘London Welsh’ for guidance, and Evans's interests and associations connected him with many bodies, and in particular with the university colleges at Aberystwyth and Bangor of the University of Wales, of which he was a governor, and which in 1922 conferred upon him the honorary degree of LL.D. Among other offices he was a governor of the Welsh National Museum and the National Library of Wales; president in 1918 of the Cambrian Archaeological Society; chairman of the executive committee of the Welsh Bibliographical Society; treasurer of the Welsh Folk-Song Society; and he took a large part in organizing and recruiting the London Welsh battalions during the war of 1914–1918. Although he made no claim to scholarship, many articles of useful comment and careful compilation were published by him in Y Cymmrodor and the Transactions of the Honourable Society of Cymmrodorion.

Evans, who was knighted in 1909 for his services to Wales, Sheriff of Merionethshire in 1919, and appointed Member of the Order of the Companions of Honour in 1922, was of sturdy build, somewhat above the middle height, with a large and striking head, typical of the people of the uplands of Merioneth. He married in 1881 Annie Elizabeth (died 1898), daughter of Thomas Beale, of Oxford, and had a son, Mr. Lewis Noel Vincent Evans, CB, deputy director of public prosecutions, and a daughter. Evans died in London 13 November 1934.

Evans' public appointments included:

- Chairman of the Royal Commission on the Ancient and Historical Monuments of Wales and Monmouthshire
- Governor of the Welsh National Museum
- Governor of the National Library of Wales
- President of the Cambrian Archaeological Association (1918)
- Vice-chairman of the executive committee of the Welsh Bibliographical Society
- Treasurer of the Welsh Folk-Song Society
