= Religion in Wales =

Religion in Wales (2021)
1. No religion (46.5%)
2. Christianity (43.6%)
3. Islam (2.20%)
4. Hinduism (0.40%)
5. Buddhism (0.30%)
6. Other religions (0.70%)
7. Not stated (6.30%)

Religion in Wales has become increasingly diverse over the years. Christianity was the religion of virtually all of the Welsh population until the late 20th century, but it rapidly declined throughout the early 21st century. Today, a plurality (46.5%) of people in Wales follow no religion at all.

Representing 43.6% of the Welsh population in 2021, Christianity is the largest religion in Wales. Wales has a strong tradition of nonconformism, particularly Methodism. The Church of England was the established church until 1920 when the disestablished Church in Wales, was set up as a self-governing, though still Anglican, church.

Most adherents to organised religion in Wales follow one of the Christian denominations such as the Presbyterian Church of Wales, Baptist and Methodist churches, the Church in Wales, Catholicism or Eastern Orthodoxy. Other religions Welsh people may be affiliated with include Buddhism, Hinduism, Judaism, Islam, Sikhism and Druidism, with most non-Christian Welsh people found in the large cities of Cardiff and Swansea. Some modern surveys have suggested that most Welsh people do not identify with any religion and record significantly less religious feeling in Wales than in other parts of the United Kingdom.

== Census statistics ==
Religion	2001		2011		2021	
Religion	Number	%	Number	%	Number	%
No religion	537,935	18.5	982,997	32.1	1,446,398	46.5
Christianity	2,087,242	71.9	1,763,299	57.6	1,354,773	43.6
Islam	21,739	0.7	45,950	1.5	66,947	2.2
Hinduism	5,439	0.2	10,434	0.3	12,242	0.4
Buddhism	5,407	0.2	9,117	0.3	10,075	0.3
Sikhism	2,015	0.1	2,962	0.1	4,048	0.1
Judaism	2,256	0.1	2,064	0.1	2,044	0.1
Other religion	6,909	0.2	12,705	0.4	15,926	0.5
Religion not stated	234,143	8.1	233,928	7.6	195,041	6.3
Total population	2,903,085	100.0	3,063,456	100.0	3,107,494	100.0

Christianity
Other
No religion
Not stated

== Christianity ==
=== History ===
==== Roman origins ====
Although Christianity arrived in Wales sometime in the Roman occupation, it was initially suppressed. The first Christian martyrs in Wales, Julius and Aaron, were killed around AD 304. The earliest Christian object found in Wales is a vessel with a Chi-Rho symbol found at Caerwent. Christianity became the official religion of the Roman Empire in the 4th century. After the Roman legions withdrew in the 5th century Anglo-Saxon invaders gradually conquered eastern and southern Britain but were unable to make inroads into Wales, cutting off Wales from the Celts in Scotland, Cornwall and Cumbria. The writer Gildas drew sharp contrasts between the Christian Welsh at this time and the pagan Anglo-Saxon invaders.

==== Emergence ====
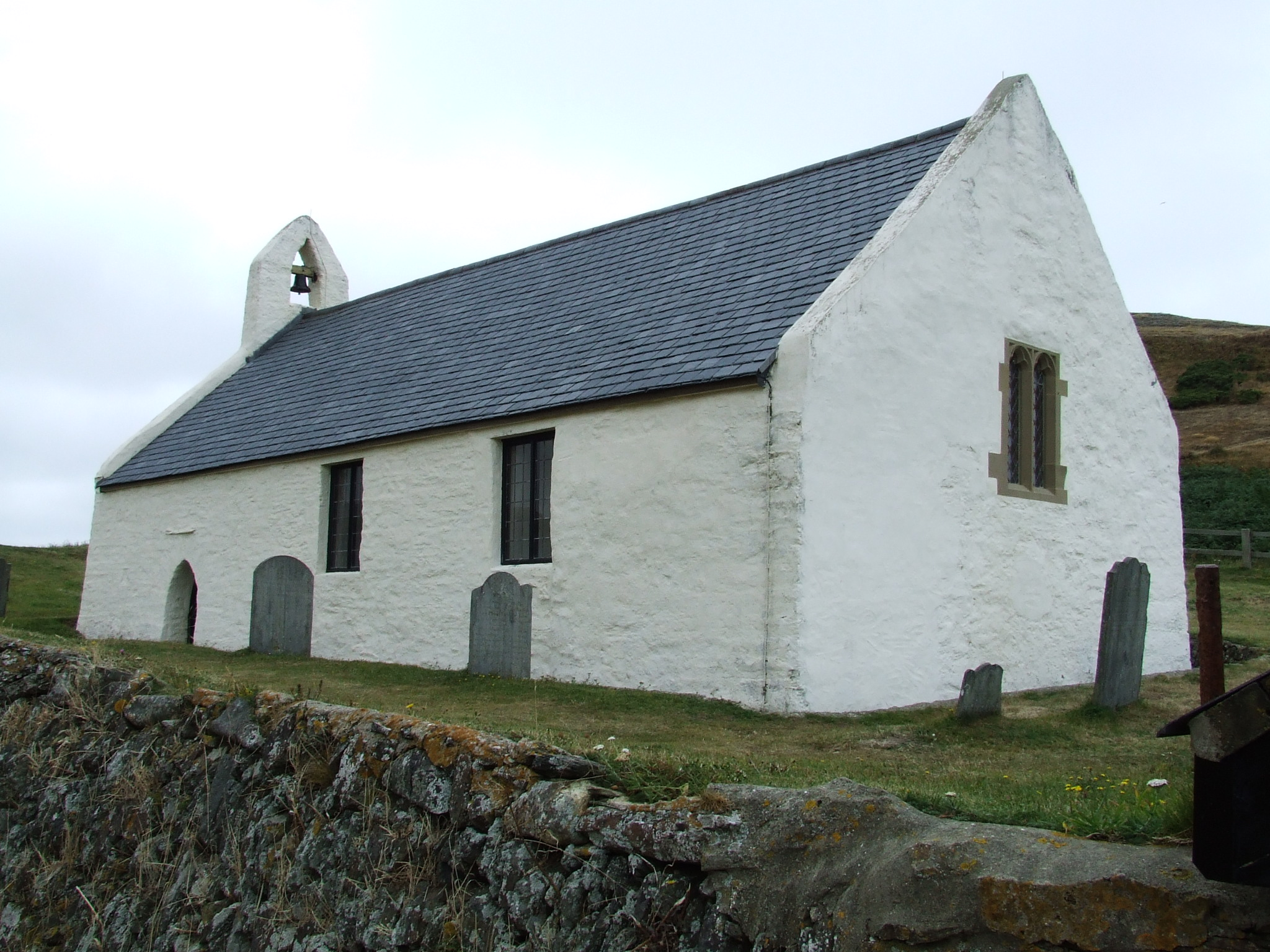
Eglwys-y-Grog, a 13th-century church in Mwnt, Ceredigion

The Age of the Saints (about AD 500–700) was marked by the establishment of monastic settlements throughout the country by religious leaders such as Saint David, Illtud, and Teilo. This was the period when the Welsh developed a shared national identity arising from their language and religious beliefs.

The Welsh bishops refused to cooperate with Augustine of Canterbury's mission to the Anglo-Saxons. However, a combination of Celtic Christianity's reconciliation with Rome and the English conquest of Wales meant that from the Middle Ages, the Welsh dioceses became part of the Province of Canterbury. They were all Catholic until the Reformation broke with Rome and created the Church of England under the control of King Henry VIII. The Established Church in Wales was the Church of England until it was disestablished in Wales in 1920. The old Welsh dioceses became the new Church in Wales. It created two new dioceses: the Diocese of Monmouth in 1921, and the Diocese of Swansea and Brecon in 1923.

==== Reformation ====
Bishop Richard Davies and dissident Protestant cleric John Penry introduced Calvinist theology to Wales. They used the model of the Synod of Dort of 1618–1619. Calvinism developed through the Puritan period, following the restoration of the monarchy under Charles II, and within Wales' Methodist movement. However, few copies of Calvin's writings were available in Welsh before the mid-19th century.

==== Welsh as liturgical language ====
Some books of the Bible and the Apocrypha had been translated in the Middle Ages, but the Acts of Union (1536–43) passed under King Henry VIII effectively banned the Welsh language from official use. However, under Queen Elizabeth I, the English Parliament passed the An Act for the Translating of the Bible and the Divine Service into the Welsh Tongue 1563. In 1567 William Salesbury, Richard Davies and Thomas Huet completed the first modern translation of the New Testament into Welsh and the first translation of the Book of Common Prayer (Welsh: Y Llyfr Gweddi Gyffredin). Then, in 1588, William Morgan completed a translation of the whole Bible. These translations were essential to the survival of the Welsh language and had the effect of conferring status on Welsh as a liturgical language and vehicle for worship. This had a significant role in its continued use as a means of everyday communication and as a literary language down to the present day despite the pressure of English.

Abuses did occur, and in the 18th century some bishops granted benefices in Welsh-speaking areas to English clergy who did not speak Welsh. This contravened Article XXIV of the Articles of Religion of the Church of England: It is a thing plainly repugnant to the Word of God, and the custom of the Primitive Church, to have publick Prayer in the Church, or to minister the Sacraments in a tongue not understanded of the people. In 1766 the churchwardens of the parish of St Beuno, Trefdraeth on Anglesey, supported by the Cymmrodorion, began a test case against an English clergyman, Dr Thomas Bowles, who could not conduct services in Welsh and whose attempt to do so had ended in ridicule. In its verdict in 1773 the Court of Arches refused to deprive Dr Bowles of his living, but did lay down the principle that clergy should be examined and found proficient in Welsh in order to be considered for Welsh-speaking parishes.

==== 18th century conditions ====
The condition of religion in Wales was bleak from the mid-17th century to the mid-18th century. The established Church of England recovered slowly from the widespread damage brought about by the English Civil War, and the Puritan Commonwealth of Cromwell, in the mid-17th century. Poverty was widespread in the overwhelmingly rural country. The clergy were impoverished and subsisted on their own farm work on their glebes. Facilities from personages to graveyards to churches to cathedrals were commonly in physical disrepair. Membership and participation was falling.

==== Nonconformity, membership and revivals ====
Nonconformity grew rapidly and came to dominate the religious life of Wales from the eighteenth to the twentieth centuries. The Welsh Methodist revival of the 18th century was one of the most significant religious and social movements in the history of Wales. The revival began within the Church of England in Wales and at the beginning remained as a group within it, but the Welsh revival differed from the Methodist revival in England in that its theology was Calvinist rather than Arminian. Welsh Methodists gradually built up their own networks, structures, and even meeting houses (or chapels), which led eventually to the secession of 1811 and the formal establishment of the Calvinistic Methodist denomination in 1823 (which assumed as its alternative name the Presbyterian Church of Wales in 1928). Emotionalism had free rein; in contrast to Scotland with its four universities, good schools, and a strong theological tradition, Wales had no universities and widespread illiteracy.

The Welsh Methodist revival also had an influence on the older nonconformist churches, or dissenters – the Baptists and the Congregationalists – who in turn also experienced growth and renewal. As a result, by the middle of the nineteenth century, Wales was predominantly a nonconformist country.

Statistics of membership between 1680 and 1840 demonstrate that the established Church of England lost one-fifth of its membership. In addition, an ever-increasing number of nominal Anglicans also ceasing to practise. Nonconformity more than quadrupled, mainly from 1760 and especially after 1800. In 1800 there were twice as many Anglican churches as Nonconformist chapels; in 1850, chapels outnumbered churches by a ratio of 5 to 2. Roman Catholicism kept pace with demographic growth, but, even reinforced by Irish immigration, remained a limited force in 1840. Judaism and overt irreligion were both rare.

In 1910, the nonconformist bodies numbered 550,000 members, as against 193,000 in the established Church of England. Nonconformists, led by Liberal David Lloyd George, increasingly controlled the politics of Wales, although the elite sectors were still dominated by the Anglicans.

The 1904–1905 Welsh Revival was the largest full scale Christian Revival of Wales of the 20th century. At least 100,000 people became Christians during the 1904–1905 revival. Even so, it did not put a stop to the gradual decline of Christianity in Wales, only holding it back slightly. Despite this, by 2011 South Wales (and especially settlements in the former coalfield area) showed the highest proportions of no religion anywhere in the country, rising in places to over 50%. The reasons for this are unclear.

==== Disestablishment – creation of the Church in Wales ====
In reaction to the rise of nonconformity, some Anglicans came to recognise the weaknesses of the established church and its failure to counteract the popular aspects of nonconformity. The rigidity of the parish system and the distance between churches were quoted as examples of the failure of the church to adapt.

The Welsh Church Act 1914 provided for the separation of the four dioceses of the Church of England located in Wales (known collectively as the Church in Wales) from the rest of the Church, and for the simultaneous disestablishment of the Church. The Act came into operation in 1920. Since then there has been no established church in Wales. Between 1996 and 2016, the number of signed-up Church in Wales members dropped from 91,247 to 45,759, or 1.5% out of a total population of 3,113,150. The number of Church in Wales members on the "Electoral Roll" dropped further to 42,441 in 2018, or 1.4% out of the total Welsh population of 3,187,203. In 2018, research conducted by YouGov found that 56% of Christians in Wales identified as members of the Church in Wales; Christians were 41% of the population according to the same survey in 2018. In 2021, the World Christian Database, produced by the Center for the Study of Global Christianity at Gordon-Conwell Theological Seminary, published data from 2020 estimating there were 1.1 million baptised Anglicans in Wales.

=== Present-day Catholic Christianity ===
Catholics are served by the Ecclesiastical Province of Cardiff, which comprises the Archdiocese of Cardiff-Menevia and the Diocese of Wrexham. The bishops of these dioceses are part of the Catholic Bishops' Conference of England and Wales. In total, the two dioceses counted 209,451 Catholics out of a population of 3,112,451 inhabitants, equalling to a percentage of 6.7% Catholics. In 2018, research conducted by YouGov found that 17% of Christians in Wales identified as Catholic. The two dioceses have 172 priests and 34 permanent deacons, 75 male religious and 267 female religious, and a total of 154 parishes as of 2016 (2017 for the diocese of Wrexham). However, the province does not entirely coincide with Wales, as the Archdiocese of Cardiff also covers Herefordshire, in England.

=== Sabbatarianism ===
The Sabbatarian temperance movement was strong among the Welsh in the Victorian period and the early twentieth century, the sale of alcohol being prohibited on Sundays in Wales by the Sunday Closing (Wales) Act 1881 – the first legislation specifically issued for Wales since the Middle Ages. From the early 1960s, local council areas were permitted to hold referendums every seven years to determine whether they should be wet or dry on Sundays: most of the industrialised areas in the east and south went wet immediately, and by the 1980s, Dwyfor in the northwest as the last of the dry regions went wet after a local referendum in 1982; however, in the next referendum it returned to a dry region on Sundays from 1989 to 1996. In early 1996 the reorganisation of local government in Wales resulted in Dwyfor district being abolished. The Dwyfor area is now covered by an area committee of the Gwynedd Council and there have been no further "Wet - Dry" referendums.

=== Saints ===
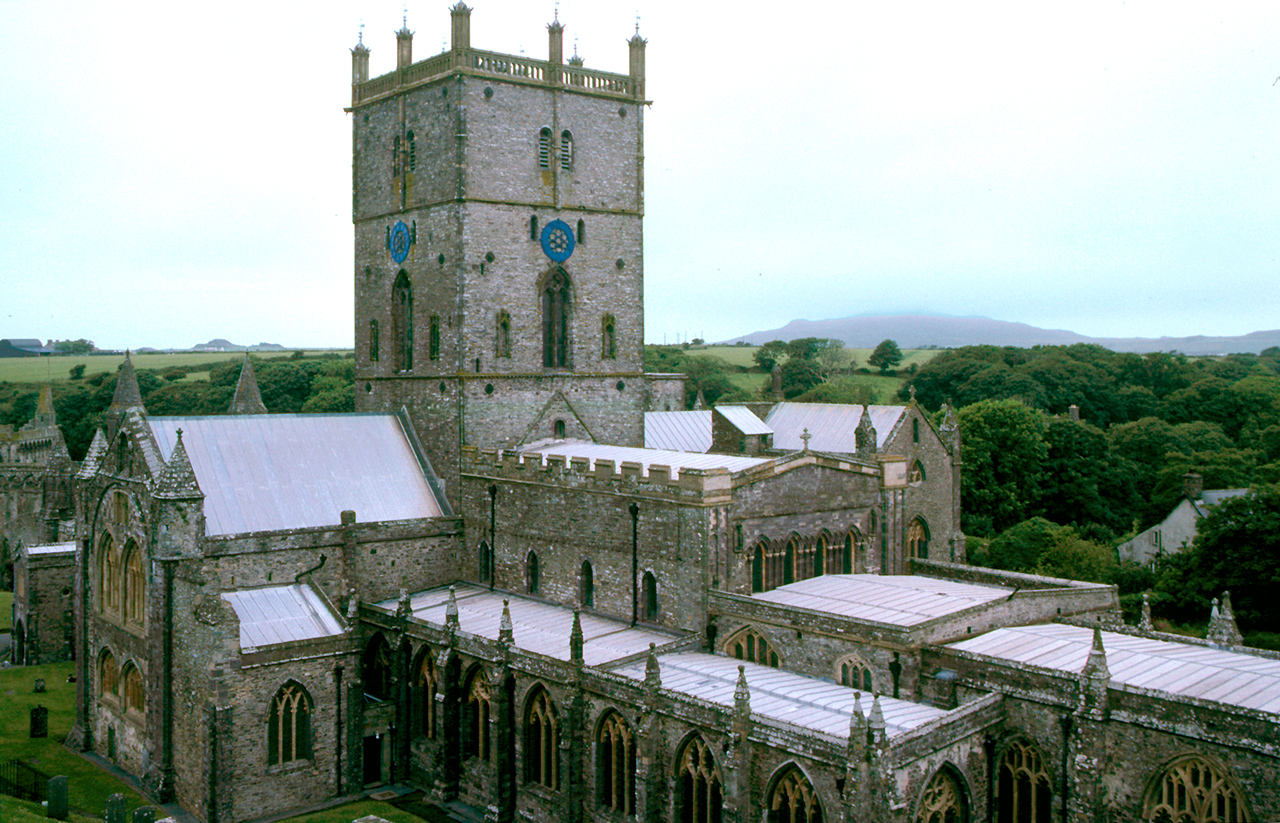
A monastic community was founded by Saint David at what is now St David's. The present building of St David's Cathedral was started in 1181.

Saint David is the patron saint of Wales.

Wales is particularly noted for naming places after either local or well-known saints – many or perhaps most places beginning in Llan e.g. Llanbedr – St Peter (Pedr); Llanfair – St Mary (Mair); Llanfihangel – St Michael (Mihangel); Llandecwyn – Saint Tecwyn. Because of the relatively small number of saints' names used, places names are often suffixed by their locality e.g. Llanfihangel Glyn Myfyr, Llanfihangel y Creuddyn, Llanfihangel-y-Pennant.

== Islam ==
The largest non-Christian faith in Wales is Islam, with about 46,000 adherents in 2011. Most Muslims live in Cardiff (23,656 in 2011, 6.8% of the population), but there are also significant numbers in Newport (6,859 in 2011) and Swansea (5,415 in 2011).

There has been a Somali and Yemeni Islamic community in Cardiff since the mid-1800s, founded by seafarers to Cardiff Docks.

== Judaism ==
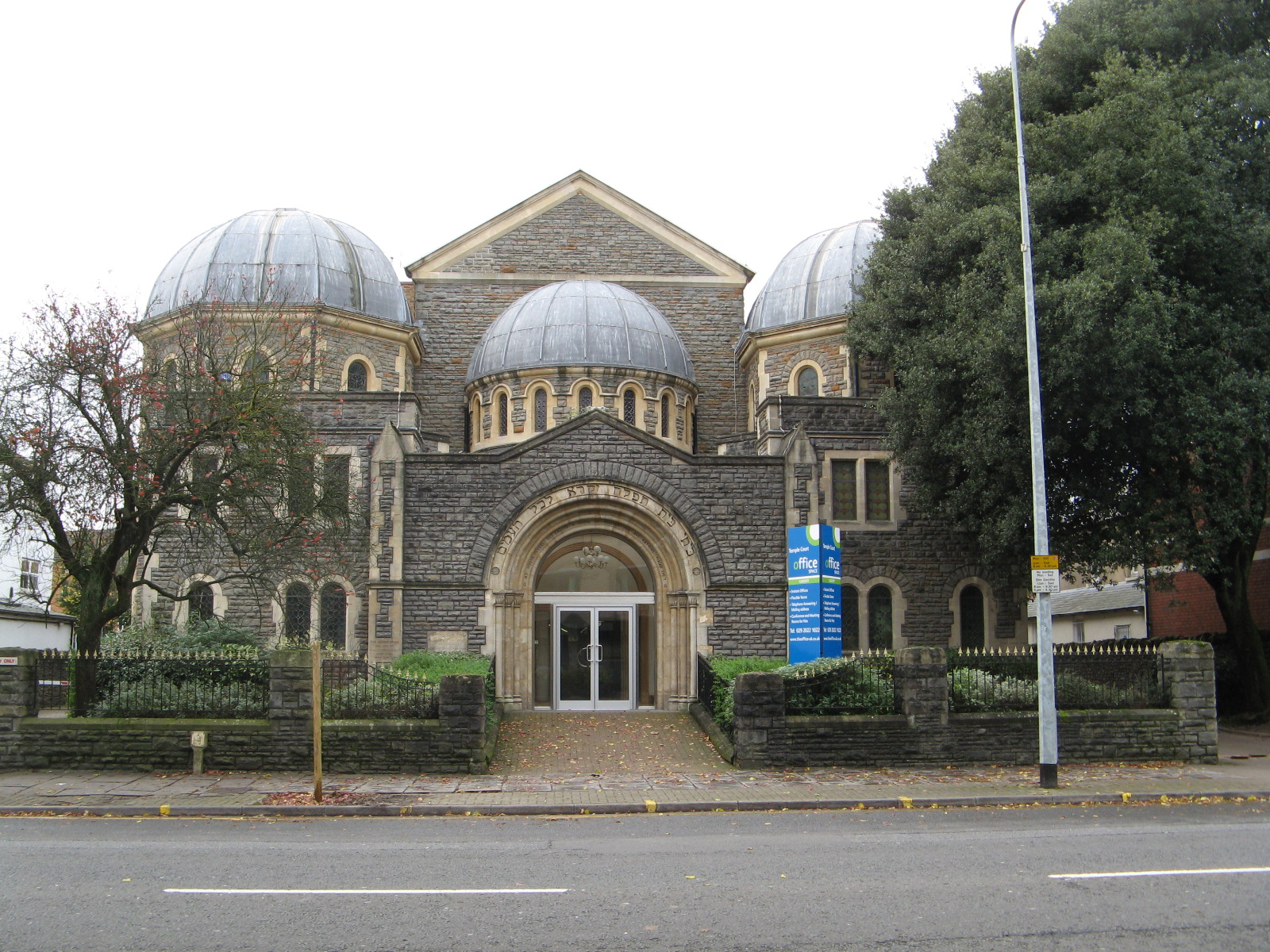
Old building of the Cardiff United Synagogue.

Judaism has quite a long history in Wales, with a Jewish community recorded in Swansea from about 1730. In August 1911, in a period of public disorder and industrial disputes, Jewish shops across the South Wales coalfield were damaged by mobs. Since that time the Jewish population of that area, which reached a peak of 4,000–5,000 in 1913, has declined. In 2011 there were a total of 2,064 Jewish adherents in Wales, including 802 in Cardiff.

== Other faiths ==
=== Buddhism, Hinduism and Sikhism ===
Hinduism and Buddhism each have about 10,000 adherents in Wales, with the rural county of Ceredigion being the centre of Welsh Buddhism. Govinda's temple & restaurant, run by the Hare Krishnas in Swansea, is a focal point for many Welsh Hindus. There are about 3,000 Sikhs in Wales, with the first purpose-built gurdwara opened in the Riverside area of Cardiff in 1989.

=== Other religions ===
In 2021 around 15,926 identified themselves being part from another religion including a reconstructed form of Druidry (modern), which was the pre-Abrahamic religion of Wales (not to be confused with the Druids of the Gorsedd at the National Eisteddfod of Wales).

Other religions	2011	2021
Pagan Religions	4,550	6,481
– Pagan	3,448	5,104
– Wicca	740	867
– Heathen	91	243
– Druidism	243	222
– Reconstructionist	28	45
Spiritualism and new religious movements	4,424	5,014
– Spiritualist^{1}	3,532	3,833
– Satanism	93	303
– Shamanism	38	265
– Pantheism	111	146
– Rastafari	249	145
– Witchcraft	83	77
– Animism	54	69
– Universalist	61	42
– Occult	28	33
– Scientology	57	26
– New Age	33	23
– Thelemite	8	18
– Eckankar	12	10
– Mysticism	12	9
– Unification Church	17	7
– Brahma Kumari	8	6
– Church of all Religions	28	2
Indian Religions	108	111
– Jainism	95	102
– Ravidassia	13	9
Alevism		212
Mixed Religion(s)	1,659	420
Iranian Religions	325	312
– Baha'í	275	227
– Zoroastrian	50	64
– Yazidi		21
East Asian Religions	278	245
– Taoism	228	199
– Shintoism	34	38
– Chinese Religions^{3}	16	3
Other Religions	1,361	3,143
– Theism^{2}	181	131
– Own Belief System	107	130
– Deism	57	57
– Traditional African Religion	4	10
– Druze	11	7
– Vudun	10	11
– Native American Church	8	8
– Other Religions	983	2,789
Total population	12,705	15,926
^{1} includes people who reported "spiritual"
^{2} includes people who reported "Believe in God"
^{3} includes people who reported "Confucianism"

== Irreligion ==
In the United Kingdom census, which asks the leading question, "What is your religion?", 46.5 per cent of Welsh people declared “No religion” in the 2021 census, up from 32.1% in 2011; and over twice the 18.5% in 2001. This included 66% of those aged 27.

Commenting on the figures, Humanists UK said: "[T]he results show that Wales faces a non-religious future, and that public bodies need to keep up with today’s demographics."

== Notable places of worship ==
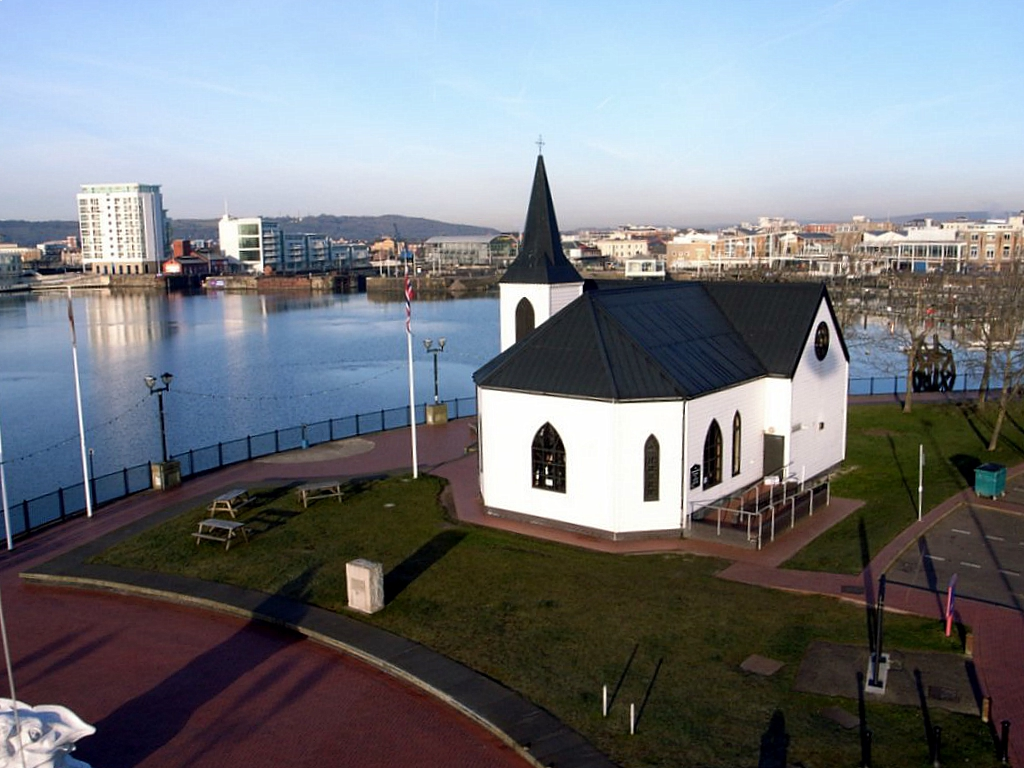
The Norwegian Church, Cardiff, was established by the Church of Norway in 1868 to serve the religious needs of Norwegian sailors and expatriates.

- Bangor Cathedral – Church in Wales
- Brecon Cathedral – Church in Wales
- Cardiff Cathedral – Roman Catholic Church
- Llandaff Cathedral – Church in Wales
- Newport Cathedral – Church in Wales
- Sikh Gurdwara Cardiff – Sikh Gurdwara Cardiff
- St Asaph Cathedral – Church in Wales
- St David's Cathedral – Church in Wales
- St. Joseph's Cathedral, Swansea – Roman Catholic Church
- Tabernacle Chapel, Morriston, Swansea – Congregational church
- Wrexham Cathedral – Roman Catholic Church

== See also ==
- Religion in the United Kingdom
- Anglican Communion
