= Religion in Great Britain =

Religion in Great Britain may refer to:

- Religion in the United Kingdom
- Religion in England
- Religion in Scotland
- Religion in Wales
