= Ceredigion Coast Path =

Long-distance footpath following the coast of Ceredigion, Wales

Ceredigion Coast Path has eleven sections

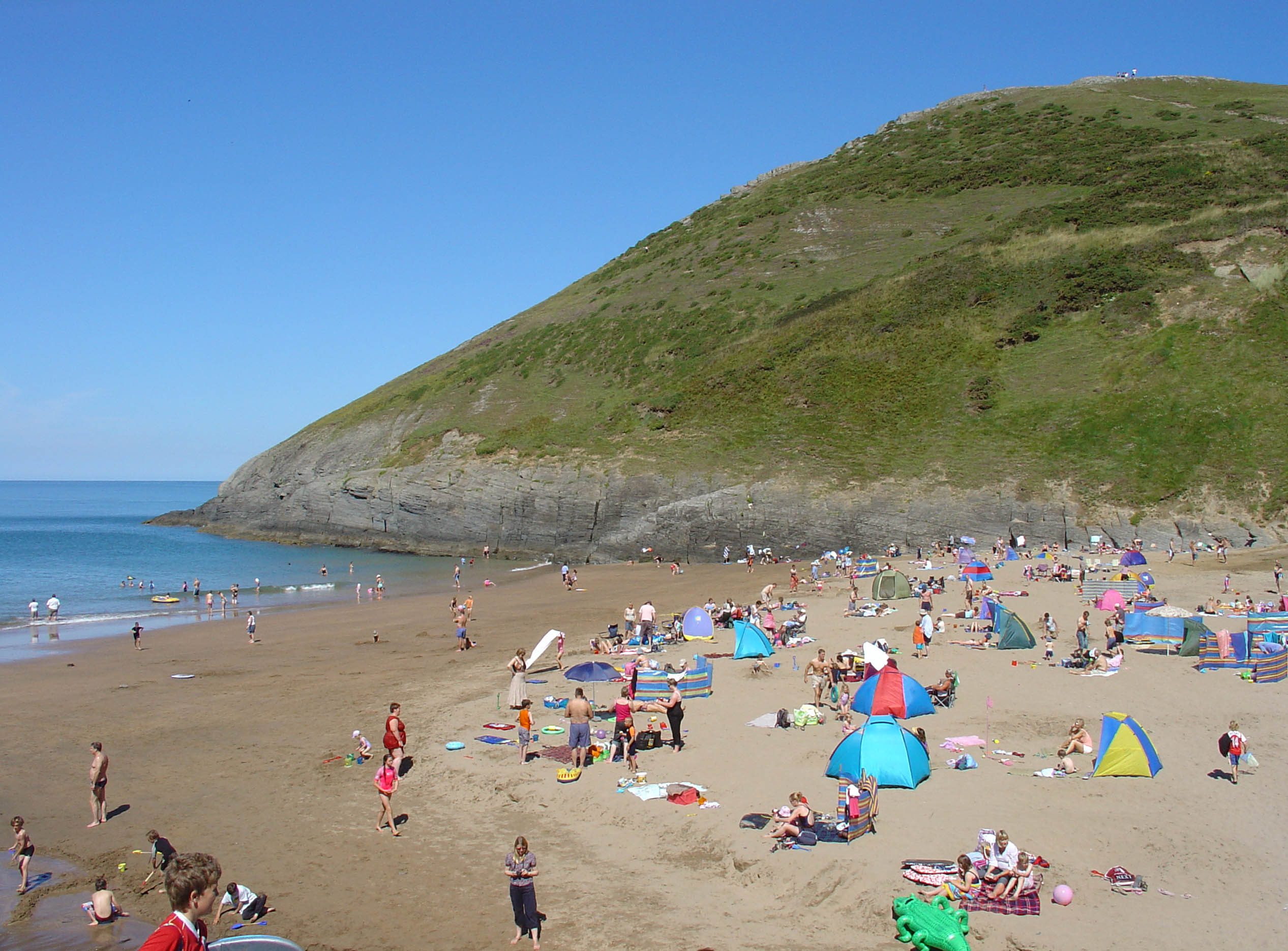
The beach at Mwnt

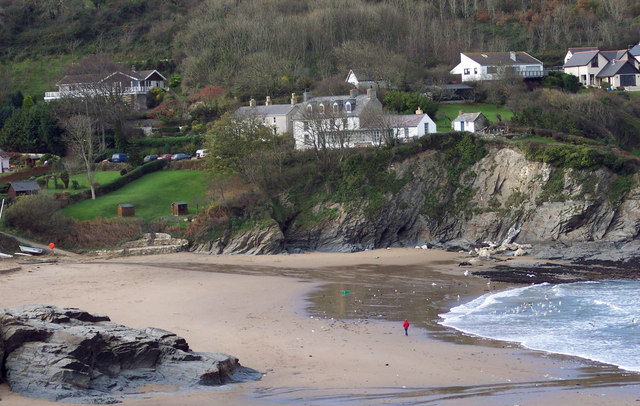
The beach at Aberporth

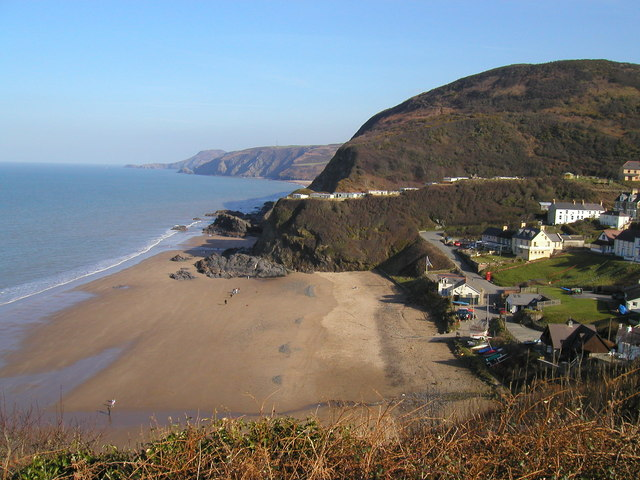
Tresaith from the coast path

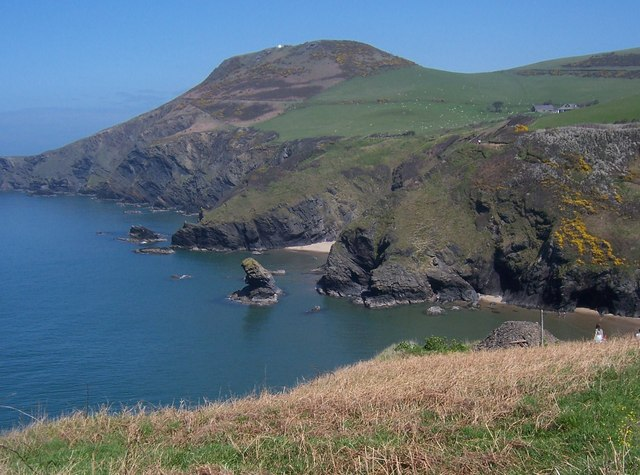
View over Llangrannog

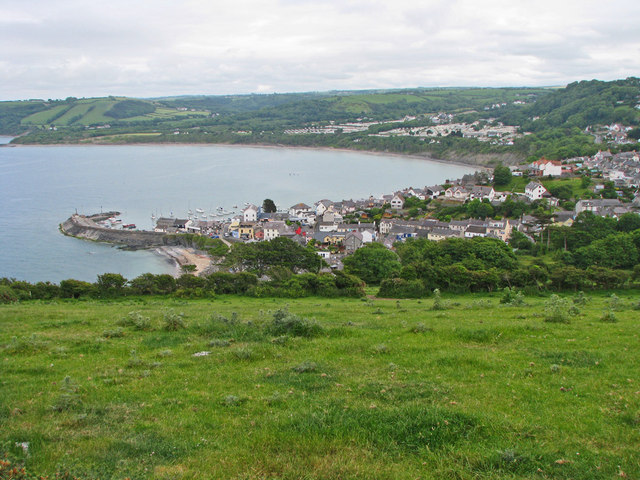
New Quay from the coast path

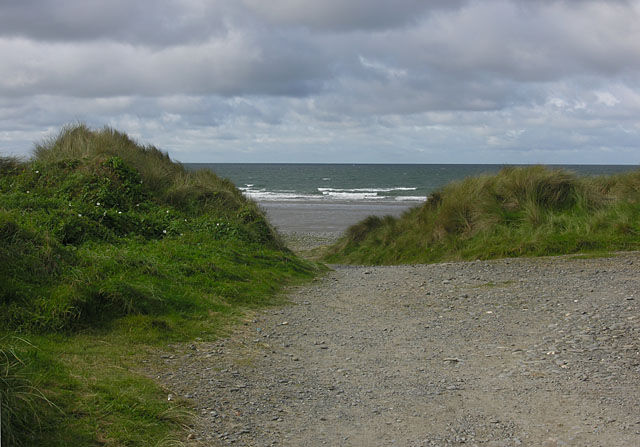
Approach to Ynyslas beach

The Ceredigion Coast Path (Welsh: Llwybr Arfordir Ceredigion) is a waymarked long distance footpath in the United Kingdom, on the coast of Ceredigion, Wales. It is 65 miles (105 km) in length, running along the coast of Cardigan Bay from Cardigan (52.0810°N 4.6608°W) to Ynyslas (52.5271°N 4.0495°W).

The path forms one section of the Wales Coast Path, an 870-mile (1,400 km) long-distance walking route around the whole coast of Wales from Chepstow to Queensferry, opened in 2012.

== Background ==
The Ceredigion Coast Path project was funded under the EU's Objective 1 programme for West Wales and the Valleys. There were previously existing lengthy public rights of way along the coastline, but the scheme allowed for these to be linked together – by creating new public access routes – to make a continuous route. The path was opened throughout in July 2008.

== Description ==
The coast path runs along the Welsh Heritage Coast from Cardigan northwards along Cardigan Bay to Ynyslas near (Borth), a little to the north of Aberystwyth. The official start, in Cardigan, is the bronze otter next to the bridge on the northern bank of the River Teifi.(SN177458) The end is at the Ynyslas war memorial.(SN609940)

The path crosses a variety of landscapes, such as the dune system at Ynyslas, high cliffs, storm beaches, sandy bays and sea caves. The path passes through small villages and some well-known tourist resorts and offers a close insight into this stretch of coast, recently officially opened up to walkers via this route, some parts of which are still under development.

There are four sections that are designated as Heritage Coast, and two areas within Cardigan Bay are marine Special Areas of Conservation because of their importance for wildlife. This section of coastline is renowned for bottlenose dolphins, grey seals and porpoises.

== Ceredigion Coast Path sections ==
The Ceredigion Coast Path can be accessed by road at a number of points, so that it can readily be split into the following eleven sections:

- Cardigan to Mwnt: 11.7 miles (18.8 km) – Note: There is a temporary route connecting Gwbert with Mwnt; the actual Ceredigion Coast Path section within that vicinity is currently unavailable because of legal proceedings.
- Mwnt to Aberporth: 5.3 miles (8.5 km)
- Aberporth to Tresaith: 1.5 miles (2.4 km)
- Tresaith to Penbryn: 1.6 miles (2.6 km)
- Penbryn to Llangrannog: 1.7 miles (2.7 km)
- Llangrannog to Cwmtydu: 5.5 miles (8.9 km)
- Cwmtydu to New Quay: 3.8 miles (6.1 km)
- New Quay to Aberaeron: 6.5 miles (10.5 km)
- Aberaeron to Llanrhystud: 7.4 miles (11.9 km)
- Llanrhystud to Aberystwyth: 10.6 miles (17.1 km)
- Aberystwyth to Borth (Ynyslas): 9.9 miles (15.9 km)

Whilst a long-distance path in its own right, it is linked at both ends as part of the Wales Coast Path. It meets the Pembrokeshire Coast Path National Trail at St Dogmaels after crossing the tidal stretch of the River Teifi via the old bridge in Cardigan.

== Access ==
Although the Ceredigion Coast Path is a long-distance path, it can easily be split into smaller sections. Some of the sections are challenging, given the undulating nature of the path, but some of the flatter sections are quite suitable for walkers of lesser or limited ability. Recently, for instance, work completed between Aberporth and Tresaith has re-routed the path to avoid steps. Also, the Aberporth Inclusive Access Cliff Top Trail is a 1-kilometre (0.6 mi) high-quality surfaced path built to wheelchair gradient standards.

Many of the coastal villages and towns were visited by the Cardi Bach bus service run between Cardigan and New Quay, particularly aimed at walkers. Introduced in 2004, it initially carried 1,000 passengers a year and only ran in the summer. This figure had risen to 4,600 by 2010. As a result of this success, the service was extended to operate all year round (six days a week over the summer and three days a week at other times) from 2012 until September 2014, with funding from the Rural Development Plan. Funding ended in September 2014 and the service closed.

The northern part of the Ceredigion Coast Path, at Borth and Aberystwyth, can be accessed by train on the Cambrian Line.
