= Church of the Holy Cross, Mwnt =

Church in Ceredigion, Wales

Coordinates: 52.1365°N 4.6377°W

Church of the Holy Cross
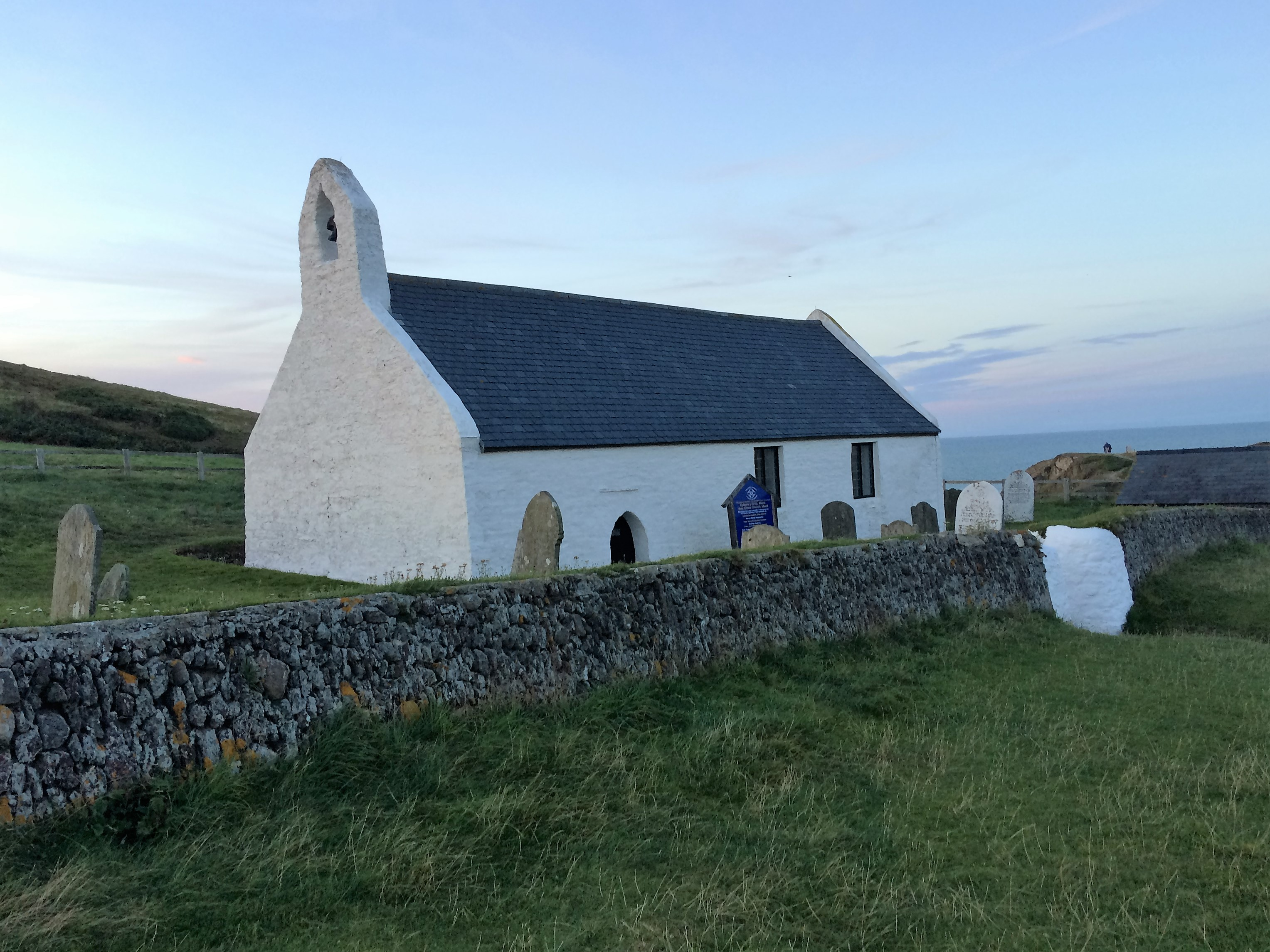

- Location in Ceredigion
- Country: Wales
- Denomination: Church in Wales

History
- Dedication: Holy Cross

Architecture
- Heritage designation: Grade I
- Designated: 21 September 1964
- Architectural type: Church

The Church of the Holy Cross (Welsh: Eglwys y Grog) at Mwnt, Ceredigion, Wales, is a parish church and Grade I listed building dating probably from the 13th century.

== History ==
The Church of the Holy Cross is an example of a medieval sailors' chapel of ease. The site is said to have been used since the Age of the Saints, but the present building is probably 13th-century. It has an example of a 12th- or 13th-century font made of Preseli stone. Mwnt was a civil parish in its own right for several centuries, but before the 17th century it was a detached chapelry of the parish of Llangoedmor. Since 1934, it has been part of the parish of Y Ferwig.

The building was restored in 1853 and again after storm damage in 1917. A 1912 photograph shows the south windows in different positions.

=== Vandalism ===
In December 2021 the church was extensively vandalised; within days, an international fundraising appeal had achieved its target of £20,000. Discussions on safety and security were planned.

== Structure ==
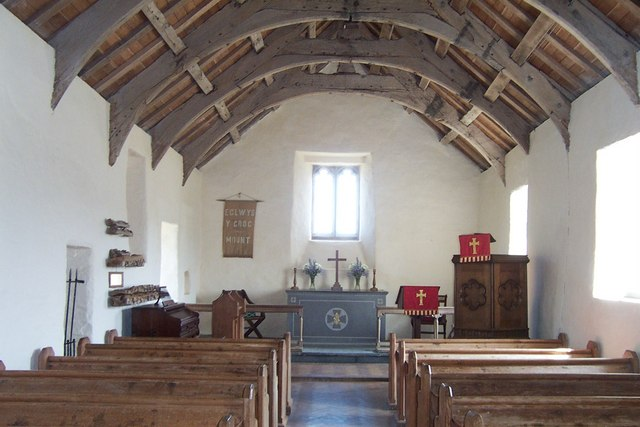
Interior

The interior is a single chamber with deep-set windows and an unusual roof type. The font is 13th century; the hexagonal pulpit is Victorian.

Externally, the church is whitewashed rubble stone walls under a slate roof. The small, enclosed churchyard contains a number of graves; monumental inscriptions are held by Dyfed Family History Society.
