= Y Cymmrodor =

- Language: Welsh

Publication details
- History: 1821–1951
- Publisher: Honourable Society of Cymmrodorion
- Frequency: Annually

Standard abbreviations
- ISO 4: Y Cymmrodor

Y Cymmrodor ('The Welshman') was the annual journal of the Honourable Society of Cymmrodorion, published between 1821 and 1951. It contained essays and lectures on historical and literary topics and Welsh poetry.

Y Cymmrodor was first published in 1821 (an unnumbered volume), followed by a four-part volume published between 1822 (part I) and 1843 (part 4). It contained essays and lectures on historical and literary topics and Welsh poetry. The series came to an end in 1843.

A new series of Y Cymmrodor was begun in 1877 (vol. 1), containing historical and literary essays. In 1939 (vol. 46) it changed character to become a series of single-volume editions of major Welsh historical sources. The series ended in 1951 (vol. 50), its functions having been taken over by the Transactions of the Honourable Society of Cymmrodorion.

The journal is being digitised by the Welsh Journals Online project at the National Library of Wales and is considered by the Library as one of "the most significant journal and periodical titles" in Wales. It has also been digitised by Google and MSN and published on the Internet Archive.

== Editors ==
- Robert Jones (Y Cymmrodor, volumes 1 – 2)
- Thomas Powell (Y Cymmrodor, volumes 3 – 7)
- Egerton Phillimore (Y Cymmrodor 8 – 11)
- E. Vincent Evans (Y Cymmrodor, volumes 13 – 22).

volume	Internet Archive (url)	Google Books (url)
1 (1877)		(1-2)
2 (1878)		(1-2)
3 (1880)		
4 (1881)		
5 (1882)		(5-6)
6 (1883)		(5-6)
7 (1886)		
8 (1887)		
9 (1888)		
10 (1889, printed 1890)		
11 (1890-1, printed 1892)	, pt 1, pt 2	
12 (1891)		
13 (1900)		(13-4)
14 (1901)		(13-4)
15 (1902)		(15-6)
16 (1903)		(15-6)
17 (1904)		(17-9)
18 (1905)		(17-9)
19 (1906)		(17-9)
20 (1907) = Robert Williams, Ystorya de Carolo Magno		
21 (1908)		(21-2)
22 (1910)		(21-2)
23 (1912)		
25 (1915)		
26 (1916)		
27 (1917)		
28 (1918) = John Morris-Jones, Taliesin		
30 (1920) = W. S. Davies, Giraldus Cambrensis: De Invectionibus		
31 (1921)		
32 (1922)		
33 (1923)		
34 (1924) = J. G. Evans, Taliesin, or the Critic Criticised		
35 (1925)		
36 (1926)		
37 (1926) = R. F. M. Wheeler, The Roman Fort near Brecon		
38 (1927)		
39 (1928)		
40 (1929)		
41 (1930) = W. F. Grimes, Holt, Denbigshire		
42 (1931)		
43 (1932)		
44 (1935)		
47 (1940) = I. C. Peate, The Welsh House. A Study in Folk Culture		
