= Pen-rhiw =

Village in Ceredigion, Wales

Coordinates: 52.118374°N 4.592457°W

- Location within Ceredigion
- OS grid reference: SN 2260 4984
  - Cardiff: 74.8 mi (120.4 km)
  - London: 195.2 mi (314.1 km)
- Community: Y Ferwig
- Principal area: Ceredigion
- Country: Wales
- Sovereign state: United Kingdom
- Post town: Cardigan
- Postcode district: SA43
- Police: Dyfed-Powys
- Fire: Mid and West Wales
- Ambulance: Welsh
- UK Parliament: Ceredigion Preseli
- Senedd Cymru – Welsh Parliament: Ceredigion

Pen-rhiw (sometimes spelt "Penrhiw") is a hamlet in the community of Y Ferwig, Ceredigion, Wales, which is 74.8 miles (120.4 km) from Cardiff and 195.2 miles (314.2 km) from London. Pen-rhiw is represented in the Senedd by Elin Jones (Plaid Cymru) and is part of the Ceredigion Preseli constituency in the House of Commons.

== See also ==
- List of Scheduled Roman to modern Monuments in Ceredigion
- List of localities in Wales by population
