= Tynewydd, Ceredigion =

Village in Ceredigion, Wales

Coordinates: 52.096940°N 4.581480°W

Tynewydd
- Location within Ceredigion
- OS grid reference: SN 2327 4743
  - Cardiff: 73.6 mi (118.4 km)
  - London: 194.6 mi (313.2 km)
- Community: Y Ferwig
- Principal area: Ceredigion
- Country: Wales
- Sovereign state: United Kingdom
- Post town: Cardigan
- Postcode district: SA43
- Police: Dyfed-Powys
- Fire: Mid and West Wales
- Ambulance: Welsh
- UK Parliament: Ceredigion Preseli
- Senedd Cymru – Welsh Parliament: Ceredigion

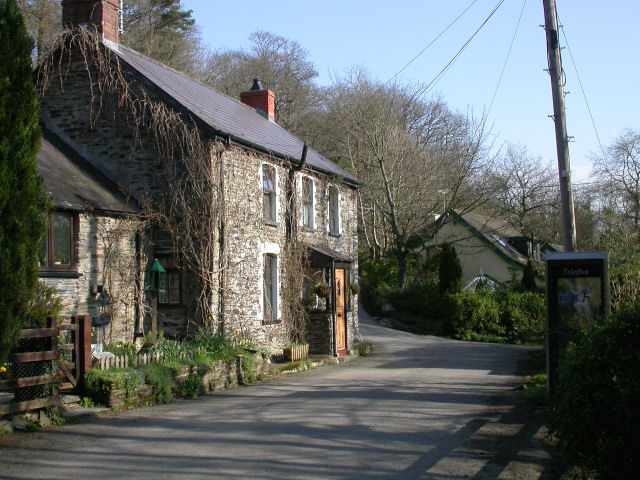
Cottages & telephone box at Tynewydd. These cottages and the telephone box are at the road junction in Tynewydd.

Tynewydd (or Tŷ Newydd) is a hamlet in the community of Y Ferwig, Ceredigion, Wales, which is 73.6 miles (118.5 km) from Cardiff and 194.6 miles (313.1 km) from London. Tynewydd is represented in the Senedd by Elin Jones (Plaid Cymru) and is part of the Ceredigion Preseli constituency in the House of Commons.

== See also ==
- List of localities in Wales by population
