= Robert Jones (writer) =

Welsh Anglican priest and writer

Robert Jones (6 January 1810 – 28 March 1879) was a Welsh Anglican priest and writer.

Jones was born on 6 January 1810 in Llanfyllin, Montgomeryshire, Wales and studied at Oswestry School and Jesus College, Oxford, from 1833 to 1837, obtaining a Bachelor of Arts degree. He was ordained and was a curate in Northop, Flintshire, north Wales, then in Barmouth, west Wales. In 1842, he became vicar of All Saints' Church, Rotherhithe, London, where he remained until his death on 28 March 1879.

Jones was a noted scholar of Welsh language and literature, in the mould of Welsh scholarly priests. Although he lived in London, he was a strong supporter of Welsh culture both in London and in Wales, being greatly involved with the Welsh community in London and supporting the National Eisteddfod and the newly established University College of Wales, Aberystwyth. He published hymns and poems in Welsh, some that he had written himself. He was the first editor of Y Cymmrodor, the transactions of the Honourable Society of Cymmrodorion, which was first published in 1876. He published reprints of works including William Salesbury's Welsh-English dictionary and an edition of poems and letters by Goronwy Owen. His collection of Welsh books is now held by the Central Library in Swansea.
