= Y Ferwig =

Village and community in Ceredigion, Wales

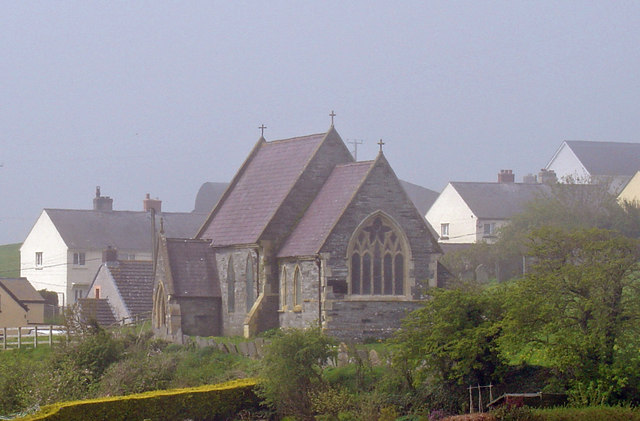
- A misty day: after a mini-heatwave, sea mist envelops the coast.

- Location within Ceredigion
- Population: 1,180 (2011)
- OS grid reference: SN185496
  - Cardiff: 90 mi (140 km)SE
- Community: Y Ferwig
- Principal area: Ceredigion
- Preserved county: Dyfed
- Country: Wales
- Sovereign state: United Kingdom
- Post town: CARDIGAN
- Postcode district: SA43
- Dialling code: 01239
- Police: Dyfed-Powys
- Fire: Mid and West Wales
- Ambulance: Welsh
- UK Parliament: Ceredigion Preseli
- Senedd Cymru – Welsh Parliament: Ceredigion Penfro
- List of places UK Wales Ceredigion 52.115°N 4.652°W Community map: Map of the community

Y Ferwig (sometimes spelled Verwig) is a small village and community in Ceredigion, Wales, about 2 to 3 miles from Cardigan.

== Amenities ==
The village is made up of a parish church and a few houses. The community includes the villages of Penparc, Felinwynt, Tremain, Mwnt and Gwbert; it also includes the hamlet Pen-rhiw, Cardigan Island, and the National Trust area of Mwnt.

The parish church of St Michael, Tremain, is a grade II* listed building.

== See also ==
- Gwbert
- Mwnt
- Tynewydd, Ceredigion
