= Transactions of the Honourable Society of Cymmrodorion =

Transactions of the Honourable Society of Cymmrodorion / Trafodion Anrhydedd Gymdeithas y Cymmrodorion is the annual journal of the Honourable Society of Cymmrodorion, published from 1893 (Vol. I). It contains historical and literary essays and reviews. The Transactions series ran alongside the earlier Y Cymmrodor until the latter series came to an end in 1951.

It is being digitised by the Welsh Journals Online project at the National Library of Wales and is considered by the Library as one of "the most significant journal and periodical titles" in Wales.
