= Mwnt =

Ancient parish in Ceredigion, Wales

Coordinates: 52.13684°N 4.63878°W

Mwnt: Welsh: (Y) Mwnt
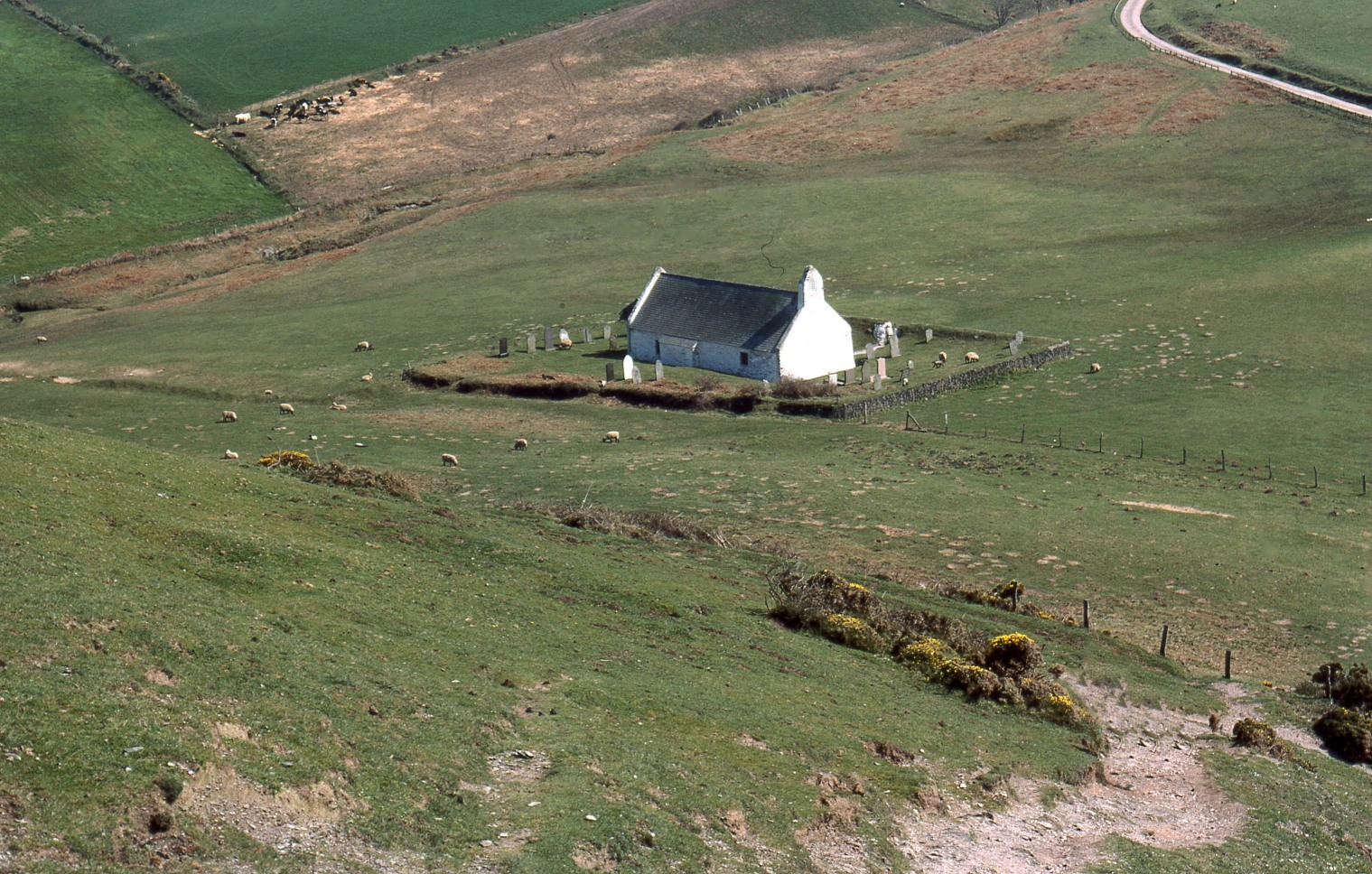
- Church of the Holy Cross from the headland

- Location within Ceredigion
- OS grid reference: SN194520
- Principal area: Ceredigion
- Preserved county: Dyfed
- Country: Wales
- Sovereign state: United Kingdom
- Post town: CARDIGAN
- Postcode district: SA43
- Dialling code: 01239
- Police: Dyfed-Powys
- Fire: Mid and West Wales
- Ambulance: Welsh
- UK Parliament: Ceredigion Preseli
- Senedd Cymru – Welsh Parliament: Ceredigion Penfro

Mwnt (Welsh: [ˈmʊnt]) is an ancient parish in Ceredigion, Wales, 4.5 miles (7.2 km) north of Cardigan. The Wales Coast Path passes through this very small settlement.

It gets its name from the prominent steep conical hill (Foel y Mwnt), a landmark from much of Cardigan Bay, that rises above the beach to a height of 76 m (249 ft), and was formerly anglicised as Mount.

== The beach ==
Mwnt is known for its popular beach, Traeth-y-Mwnt, which has been awarded a Green Coast Award (an award similar to a Blue Flag beach Award but for rural beaches). Swimming conditions are considered safe at Mwnt but there is no lifeguard service.

The Irish Sea off Mwnt is rich in wildlife, being a regular summer home to dolphins, seals and porpoises.

== Flemish invasion ==
Mwnt was the site of an unsuccessful invasion by Flemings in 1155. Its defeat was celebrated, at least in the eighteenth century, by a games meeting on the first Sunday in January known as Sul Coch y Mwnt (Red Sunday of Mwnt), commemorating the blood shed on that day. Within living memory human bones and skeletons have been exposed in the area. A nearby brook is called Nant y Fflymon (Flemings' Brook).

== Church of the Holy Cross ==
The Church of the Holy Cross (Welsh: Eglwys y Grog) is an example of a medieval sailor's chapel of ease. The site is said to have been used since the Age of the Saints, but the present building is probably 14th century. It has an example of a 12th or 13th century font made of Preseli stone. Mwnt was a civil parish in its own right for several centuries, but before the 17th century it was a detached chapelry of the parish of Llangoedmor. Since 1934, it has been part of the parish of Y Ferwig. The church is a Grade I listed building.

The beach (but not the church) is owned by the National Trust, who exercise a conservation remit over both.

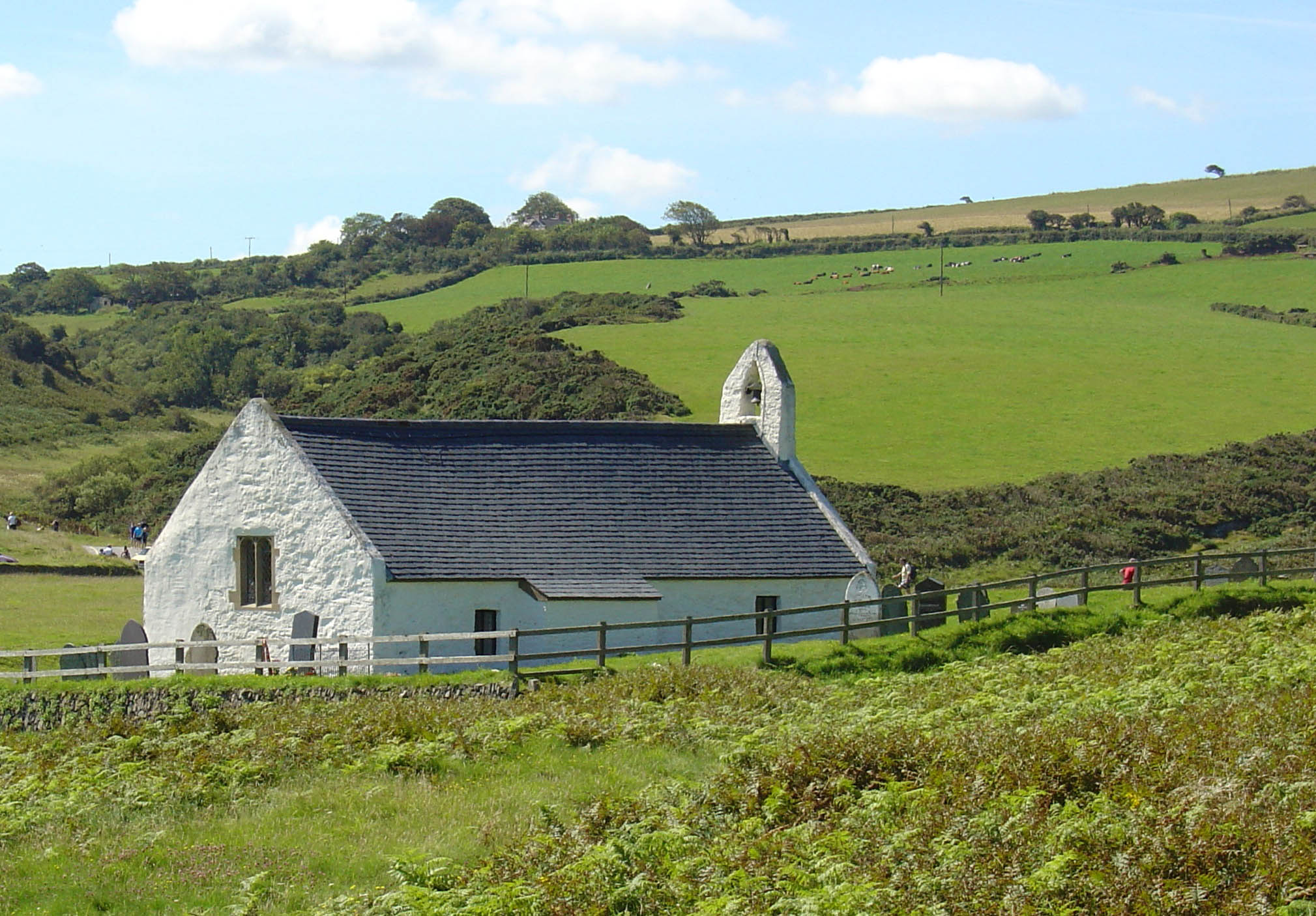
Church of the Holy Cross

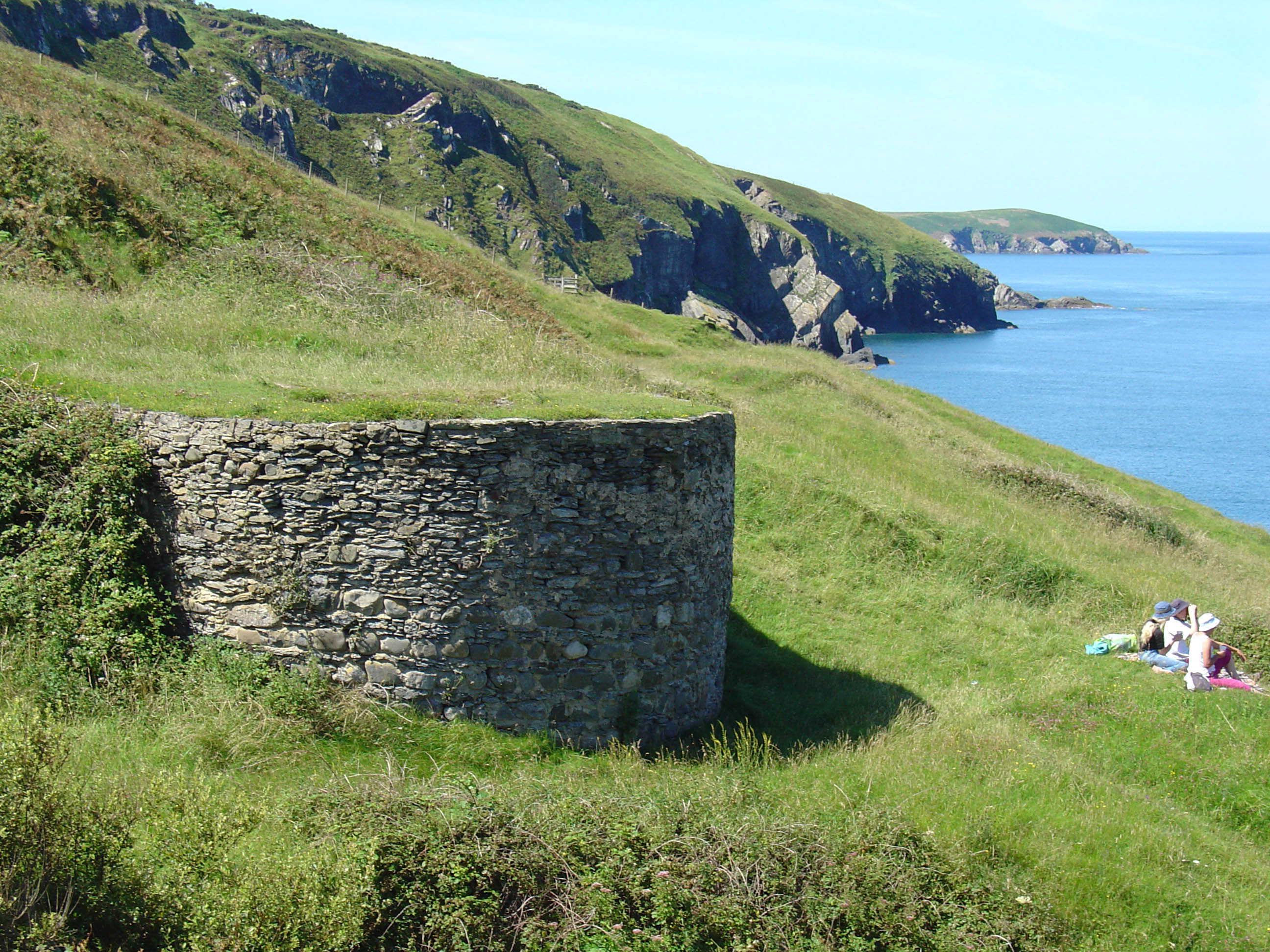
Lime kiln at Mwnt

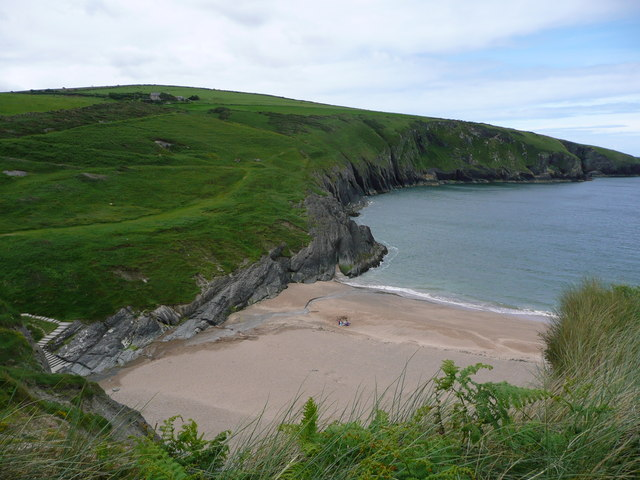
Mwnt Beach

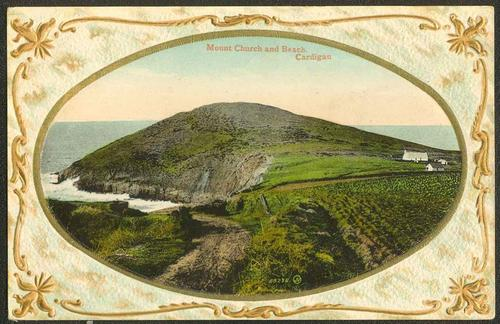
An old postcard (c.1910) entitled "Mount Church and Beach"

== See also ==
- Gwbert
