= Cribinau =

Tidal island near Anglesey, Wales

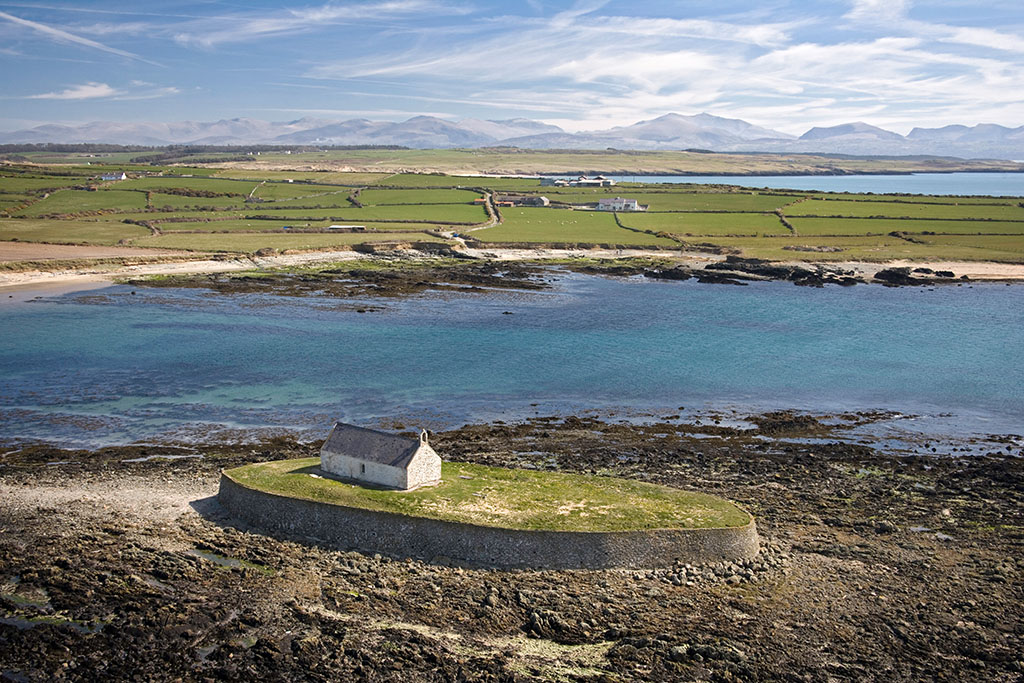
- Cribinau and St Cwyfan's church from the air

- Location within Anglesey

Geography
- Coordinates: 53°11′06″N 4°29′35″W
- OS grid reference: SH336682
- Adjacent to: Caernarfon Bay

Administration
- Wales
- Lieutenancy: Gwynedd
- Unitary authority: Isle of Anglesey County Council
- Community: Aberffraw

Cribinau is a small tidal island off the south west coast of the isle of Anglesey in Wales between Porth China and Porth Cwyfan. The island is in Aberffraw Community, about 1 1/4 miles (2 kilometres) west of Aberffraw village.

The island can be reached on foot at low tide. It is notable for the 13th-century Church in Wales church of St Cwyfan, called in Welsh: eglwys bach y môr ("the little church in the sea") or simply Cwyfan.

== Church ==
St Cwyfan's church was in existence by 1254 and was enlarged in the 14th and 15th centuries. The building later fell into disrepair, and in the 19th century parts of the church were demolished. By 1891 the surviving part was roofless, so an appeal was launched which paid for the building of a new roof. In about the 1970s all the windows were restored, but now the building is deteriorating again and a new restoration appeal has been launched.

== Sea erosion ==
A Jacobean map dated 1636 shows the church standing on the mainland of Anglesey. Written evidence submitted in 1770 in the case against Thomas Bowles says that the road from Aberffraw to Llangwyfan was bad, but makes no mention of the tide restricting access to the church. Therefore, it seems to be after that date that sea erosion of the boulder clay cliffs turned Cribinau into an island. By the 19th century, erosion was causing graves in the churchyard to fall into the sea, so a seawall was built around the island to protect the remaining graves and the church.
