= Thomas Bowles (priest) =

- Born: 1696; Corfe Castle, Dorset
- Died: 6 November 1773 (aged 76–77)
- Education: University College, Oxford
- Occupation: Clergyman
- Years active: 1717–73
- Organization: Church of England
- Known for: not speaking Welsh
- Spouse(s): Elizabeth, née Lisle

Thomas Bowles (died 1773) was a Church of England priest. He is notable for a controversy in which he was appointed to two parishes in Wales where hardly any parishioners spoke English, despite the fact that Bowles spoke no Welsh.

== Early life ==
Bowles was born at Lower Donhead St. Andrews, Wiltshire on 23 December 1694, the son of Reverend Matthew and Elizabeth Bowles.

== Ministry in England ==
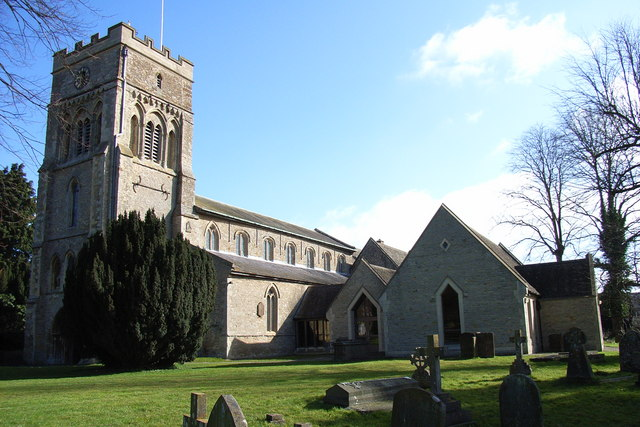
St Peter's parish church, Brackley, Northamptonshire, where Bowles was Rector for 37 years, 1729–66

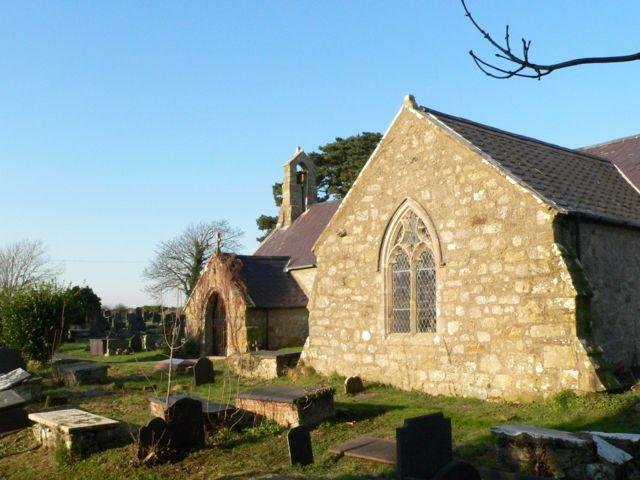
St Beuno's parish church, Trefdraeth, Anglesey, where Bowles' seven-year incumbency 1766–73 was contested because he did not speak Welsh

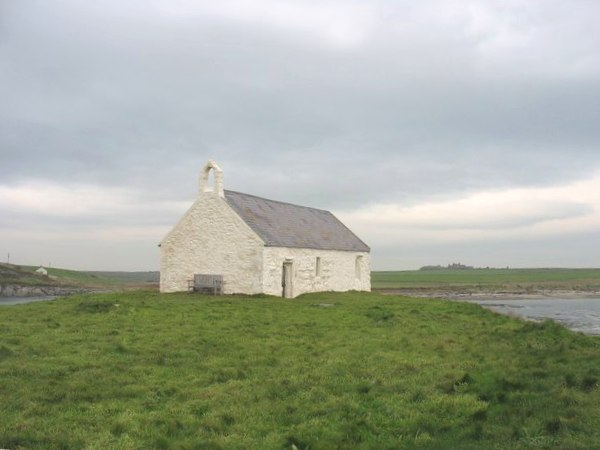
St Cwyfan's chapel, Llangwyfan, part of St Beuno's benefice, where the curate John Griffith said he never saw Bowles conduct a service

Bowles was a graduate of Magdalen College, Oxford. He followed his father into the church, being ordained deacon on 16 June 1717 and priest on 24 May 1719. He was Vicar of St Mary de Haura, New Shoreham, Sussex, from 23 September 1727 until 3 October 1728.

Bowles was Rector of the parish of St Peter, Brackley, Northamptonshire for 37 years, from 1729 to 1766. From January 1734 he also held two Berkshire parishes, being the absentee Rector of Tubney (from 18 January) and Aston Tirrold (from 19 January). He would seldom if ever have ministered in either Tubney or Aston Tirrold: Bowles followed the then common Church of England practice of pluralism, under which Rectors could hold a number of parishes for their tithe or glebe income, use some of that income to pay a perpetual curate to minister in each parish, and keep the difference.

== Ministry in Wales ==
In April 1766 Bowles vacated St Peter's Brackley and was made Rector of two parishes on Anglesey: St Beuno, Trefdraeth and St Cwyfan, Llangwyfan. In August he also resigned his absentee rectorates of Tubney and Aston Tirrold.

Between them Trefdraeth and Llangwyfan had about 500 parishioners, of whom all but five spoke only Welsh, whereas Bowles was a monoglot who spoke only English. The churchwardens and parishioners of Trefdraeth therefore petitioned against Bowles' appointment. John Thomas (1736–69), headmaster of Beaumaris Grammar School, supported the petitioners and enlisted funding and support from the Honourable Society of Cymmrodorion.

The churchwardens of Trefdraeth, Richard Williams and Hugh Williams, brought a prosecution under ecclesiastical law. In 1563 the English Parliament had passed the Act for the Translating of the Bible and the Divine Service into the Welsh Tongue. Official translations into Welsh had been published of the New Testament and the Book of Common Prayer in 1567 and of the whole Bible in 1588. Article XXIV of the Articles of Religion of the Church of England states:

It is a thing plainly repugnant to the Word of God, and the custom of the Primitive Church, to have publick Prayer in the Church, or to minister the Sacraments in a tongue not understanded of the people.

=== Ecclesiastical court case ===
The Court of Arches took evidence on the case in May 1770, two years after the bishop who appointed Bowles, John Egerton, had left the see of Bangor. Richard Williams and John Thomas testified that Bowles had seldom conducted services at St Beuno's, and when he did it was only in English. Another witness, Henry Jones, testified that Bowles had conducted a service at St Beuno's no more than three times. Williams and Jones testified that soon afterwards Bowles tried to minister in Welsh, but his grasp of the language was so poor that none of the congregation could understand him. Several witnesses, including his own curate, declared that when Bowles tried to minister the sacraments at Holy Communion, his Welsh was so bad that many communicants either burst out laughing or had to stifle themselves to avoid doing so. Since then Bowles had but seldom attended St Beuno's, and had employed a Welsh-speaking perpetual curate, John Griffith, to officiate in his stead. Griffith testified that he never saw Bowles conduct a service at St Cwyfan's.

Under cross-examination, Williams said that in October 1768 Bowles had paid a Hugh Hughes half a guinea to translate a sermon into Welsh, but that Bowles had never attempted to preach the sermon to the congregation. Williams conceded that in April 1769 Bowles managed to read the Collect, Lord's Prayer, Ten Commandments, Epistle and Gospel in Welsh, but said that only those parishioners who had Welsh Prayer Books were able to follow him, whereas most members of the congregation had no Prayer Book. Williams also testified that Bowles had tricked both him and Hugh Williams into signing a deposition that Bowles had conducted a service in Welsh "with a fluent and easy delivery, and a graceful propriety of accent and pronunciation". The deposition was signed also by Rev. Arthur Lewis, but he was Bowles' son-in-law.

The Court of Arches did not hear the prosecution and defence arguments until January 1773. Defence counsel contended "that it is for the interest of the principality that the English language should prevail in that country". The defence further asserted:

Wales is a conquered country, it is proper to introduce the English language, and it is the duty of bishops to endeavour to promote the English, in order to introduce the language... It has always been the policy of the legislature to introduce the English language in Wales. We never heard of an act of parliament in Welsh... The English language is, by act of parliament, to be used in all the courts of judicature in Wales; and an English Bible is to be kept in all the churches in Wales, that by comparison with the Welsh, they may the sooner attain the knowledge of the English.

The defence argued that in order to have Bowles deprived of the living, the prosecution had to prove not just his inability and incapacity but his total inability and incapacity to minister in Welsh. The prosecution argued that Bowles's inability to speak Welsh contravened not only one of the Articles of Religion and the Act for the Translation of the Scriptures, but also the Act of Uniformity 1662.

The Dean of Arches, George Hay, agreed that clergy who lacked knowledge of Welsh should not be appointed to Welsh-speaking parishes. However, Hay therefore concluded that clergy should be examined in Welsh before being inducted into the benefice. Bowles had been lawfully inducted and instituted to the benefice, and therefore held the ecclesiastical freehold, so Hay doubted whether he had the power to deprive him of it. Hay judged that Bowles's total incapacity had not been sufficiently proved, and his verdict therefore allowed Bowles to keep the living. On the other hand, Hay did not award Bowles his legal costs.

== Death ==
Bowles duly retained the benefice until he died in November 1773. He was then replaced in the parish and chapelry with Richard Griffith, a priest who did speak Welsh.

Bowles is commemorated by a monument in St Catherine's parish church, Llanfaes.

== Family ==
Bowles married Elizabeth Lisle of Evenley, Northamptonshire on 6 July 1727. Elizabeth bore Bowles a son, William Thomas Bowles, in 1728 and a daughter, Catherine, in 1733; she died on 9 August 1767. One of the daughters married Arthur Lewis, who was Rector of Thenford, Northamptonshire 1774–87.

William Thomas Bowles went on to be Vicar of King's Sutton, Northamptonshire 1760–73 and also Rector of Uphill and Brean in Somerset. He married Bridget, daughter of Richard Grey. Their children included:

- William Lisle Bowles (1762–1850), eldest of seven. He was ordained priest in 1792, and was known also a poet and critic.
- Henry Bowles (1765–1804), physician.
- Amy (1769–1859), married firstly in 1787 Peregrine Bingham the elder (died 1826), and was mother of Peregrine Bingham the younger. She married, secondly, Richard Williams.
- Sarah (1772–1843) married William Burlton. Their second son Philip Bowles Burlton was killed in Assam in 1829, in an incident that provoked the Anglo-Khasi War.
- Frances (died 1848) married Edward Lambert (1749–1818), a cleric.
- Margaret, married the Rev. Christopher Erle and was mother of William Erle.

A daughter Mary died aged 8 in 1773.

== Sources ==
- The Cymmrodorion (1773). The Depositions, Arguments and Judgement in the Cause of the Church-Wardens of Trefdraeth, In the County of Anglesea, against Dr. Bowles; adjudged by the Worshipful G. Hay, L.L.D. Dean of the Arches: Instituted To Remedy the Grievance of preferring Persons Unacquainted with the British Language, to Livings in Wales. London: William Harris.
- Ellis, Peter Berresford (1994) [1993]. Celt and Saxon The Struggle for Britain AD 410–937. London: Constable & Co. pp. 241–242. ISBN 0-09-473260-4.
