= Honourable Society of Cymmrodorion =

Welsh learned society

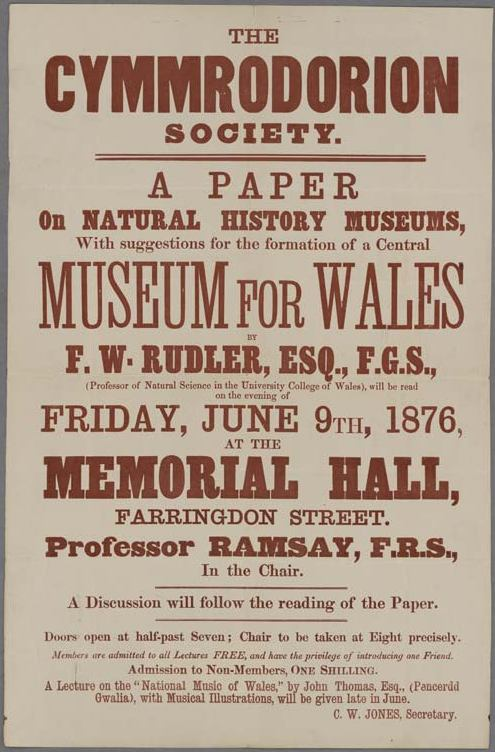
Poster publicising a meeting of the Cymmrodorion to discuss the establishment of a central Museum for Wales, June 1876.

The Honourable Society of Cymmrodorion (Welsh: Anrhydeddus Gymdeithas y Cymmrodorion), often called simply the Cymmrodorion, is a London-based Welsh learned society, with membership open to all. It was first established in 1751 as a social, cultural, literary and philanthropic institution. It fell into abeyance between 1787 and 1820, and again between 1843 and 1873. In its second and third incarnations its interests have been predominantly cultural and antiquarian. The present society claims continuity from that founded in 1751, although the three successive societies have in fact been slightly different in character and aims.

The society continues to be based in London, but now draws two-thirds of its membership from Wales.

== History ==
=== First Society, 1751–1787 ===
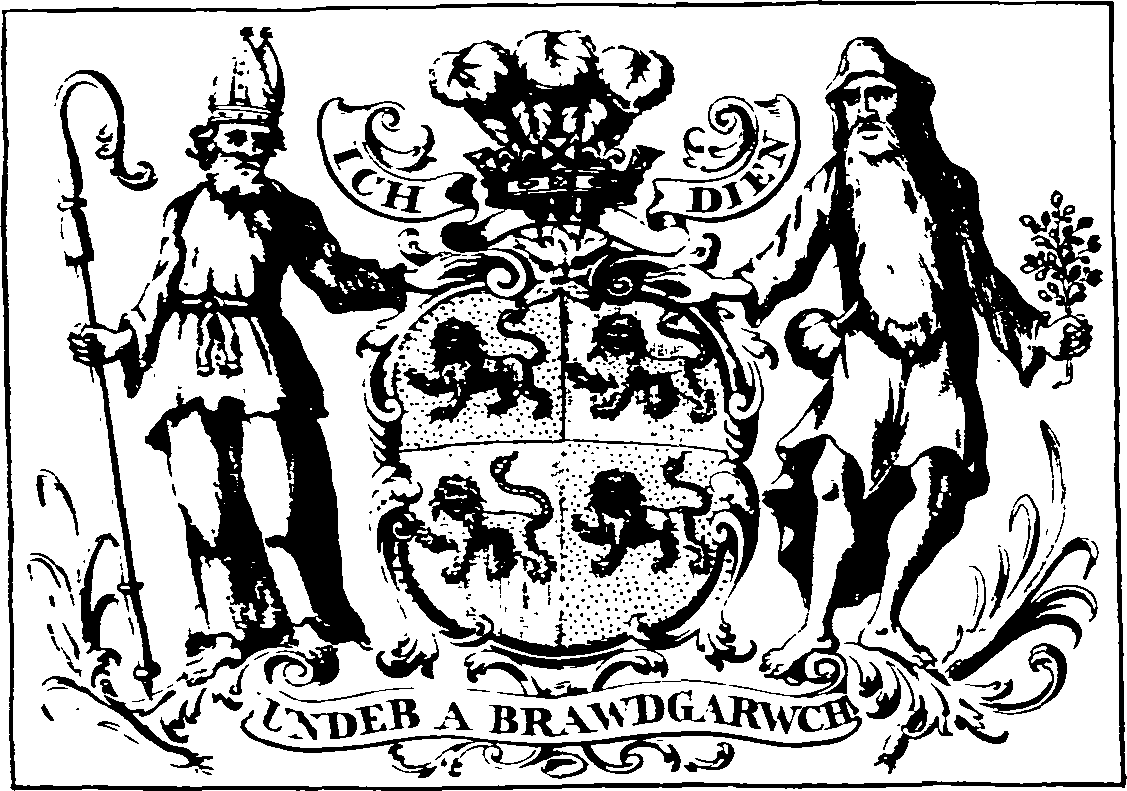
Device of the first society, featuring the arms of the native Princes of Wales; the Prince of Wales's feathers and motto, "Ich dien"; St David and a Druid as supporters; and the society's motto, "Undeb a Brawdgarwch"

The Society was founded in 1751 by the brothers Lewis and Richard Morris, natives of Anglesey. The name, coined by Lewis Morris, was a form of the Welsh: cyn-frodorion ("earliest natives"), in reference to the place of the Welsh as heirs to the ancient Britons.

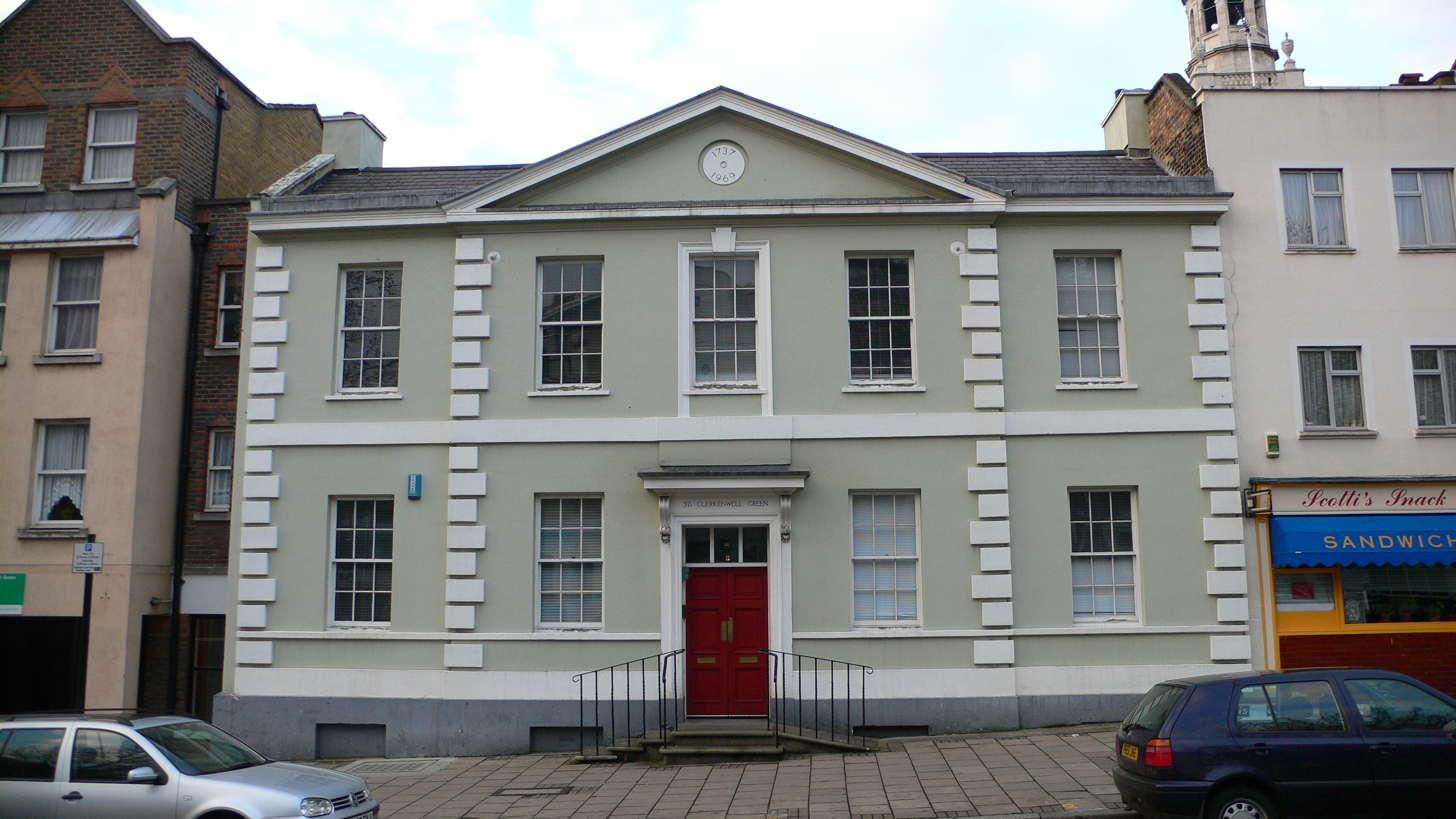
The Welsh Charity School on Clerkenwell Green (now the Marx Memorial Library)

Several factors combined to prompt the foundation of the new society. One may have been Lewis Morris's disappointment at his failure to be elected a Fellow of the Royal Society. More important was a desire to support the Welsh Charity School, established in 1716 under the auspices of another London Welsh Society, the Honourable and Loyal Society of Antient Britons. By the 1740s the Antient Britons had become somewhat moribund, and the new Society of Cymmrodorion was intended in part to supplement its efforts. It was also to raise funds to relieve impoverished Welsh people in London. The Society's primary object, however, was to be a hub of social activity for the Welsh in London, and (in the absence of a recognised political or cultural "capital" of Wales) a focus of Welsh culture. Regular meetings were held on the first Wednesday of each month, when papers were read on a variety of literary and learned topics.

Richard Morris served as the Society's first Llywydd ("President"). On his death in 1779, the Society offered a silver medal for the best elegy on its late President, a competition which can be seen as a forerunner of the National Eisteddfod of Wales. Sir Watkin Lewes succeeded Morris as Llywydd, and served until the first Society's demise in 1787. The Society had also a Penllywydd ("Chief President"). This office was held by William Vaughan of Corsygedol until shortly before his death in 1775, and then by Sir Watkin Williams-Wynn, 4th Baronet, of Wynnstay.

In the second half of the 18th century the Welsh Charity School was run jointly by the Antient Britons and the Cymmrodorion. The officers of the Cymmrodorion used the school building on Clerkenwell Green as their business address, sometimes held meetings there, and used one of its rooms as a library. The library was intended to hold a copy "of every Book that hath ever been printed in the antient British language", as well as manuscripts. It was, in other words, regarded as a prototype National Library of Wales. A regular and important activity in the Society's calendar (though primarily the responsibility of the Antient Britons) was the annual Saint David's Day dinner, held to raise funds to support the school.

The Cymmrodorion helped to fund a case in ecclesiastical law in which the churchwardens and parishioners of a Welsh-speaking benefice in Anglesey challenged the appointment to their benefice of a monoglot English priest who was unable to minister in Welsh. In 1766 John Egerton, Bishop of Bangor, appointed an elderly English priest, Dr Thomas Bowles, to the parish of St Beuno, Trefdraeth and chapelry of St Cwyfan, Llangwyfan. The Court of Arches heard evidence in the case in May 1770 but did not hear the promoters' and respondents' arguments until January 1773. Judging the case, the Dean of Arches, George Hay, agreed with the respondents that the promoters of the cause would have to prove Bowles was totally incapable of speaking any Welsh at all, and even if they did so Bowles had lawfully been granted the ecclesiastical freehold and therefore could not be deprived of it. However, he also agreed with the promoters of the cause that only clergy who could speak Welsh should be appointed to Welsh-speaking parishes. Therefore, although Hay let Bowles stay in post, the case established the principle that clergy being considered for Welsh-speaking parishes should be examined in their knowledge of Welsh and only those proficient in the language should be inducted to them.

Richard Morris died in 1779 and the Society fell into abeyance in 1787. In a symbolic gesture, its Presidential Chair was handed over to the Gwyneddigion Society (another London-based Welsh cultural society, founded in 1770). However, the Charity School, which in 1772 had moved to new premises in Gray's Inn Lane, continued to flourish.

=== Second Society, 1820–1843 ===
The Society's revival in 1820 was linked to attempts in Wales to establish a National Eisteddfod under the auspices of four provincial Cambrian Societies (for Dyfed, Gwynedd, Gwent and Powys), and the perceived need for a central organisation to oversee their activities. Its formal title was therefore the Cymmrodorion Society or the Metropolitan Cambrian Institution. Those active in the revival included John Jenkins, Walter Davies, W. J. Rees and Richard Edmunds. The Society's Presidents included Sir Watkin Williams-Wynn, 5th Baronet (son of the second Chief President of the first society) and the 2nd Earl of Powis. Others officers included John Parry ("Bardd Alaw") as Registrar of Music, Henry Davies as Librarian, and John Jones ("Ioan Tegid") as "Welsh Correspondent". The Society published Welsh texts, awarded medals, and otherwise supported Welsh culture.

Tensions and differences of opinion developed, however, between the Cymmrodorion Society and the four Cambrian Societies, over their financial relationships, over principles of Welsh spelling, and over whether the eisteddfodau should be predominantly literary or musical events. The Society seems to have been wound up in 1843.

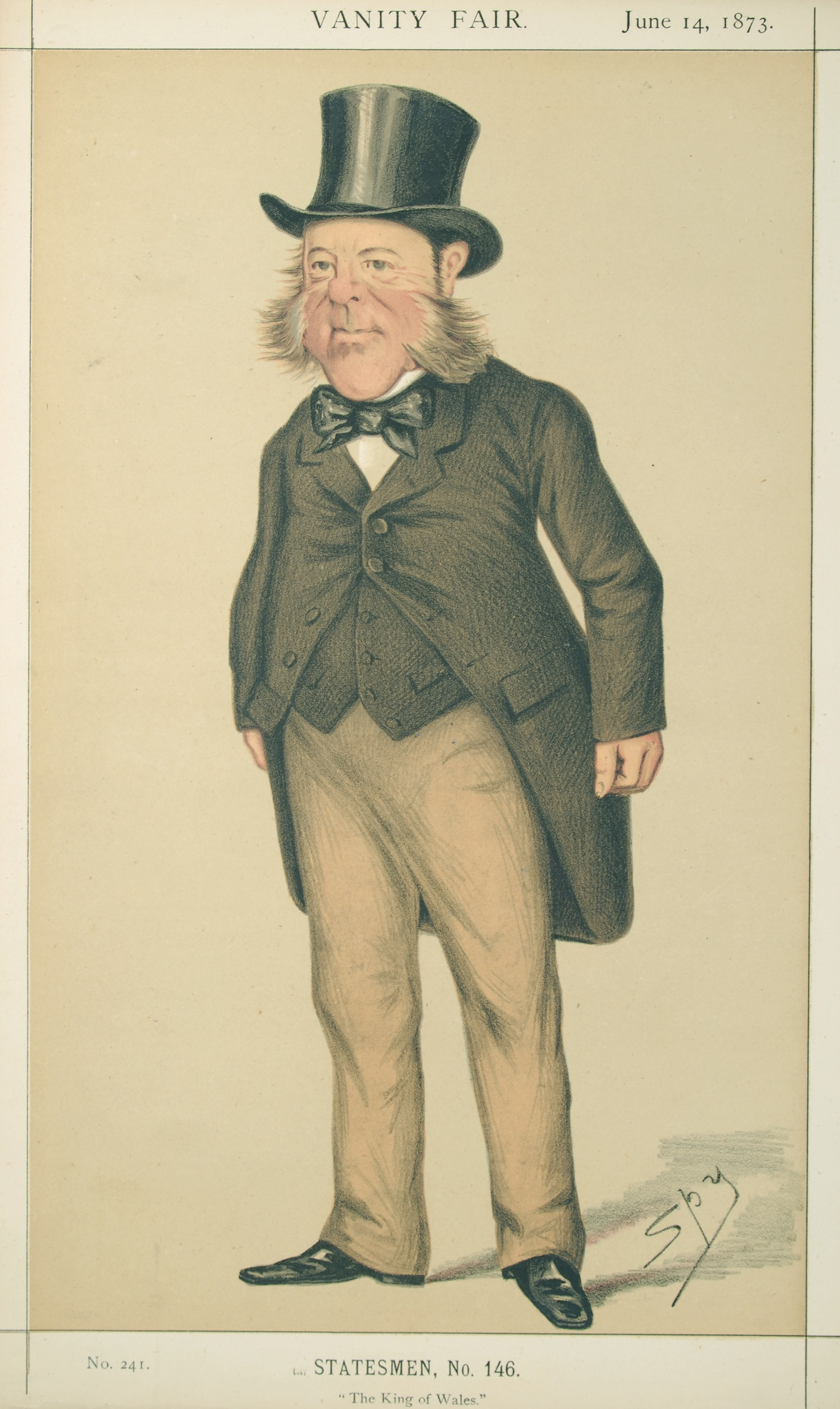
Sir Watkin Williams-Wynn, 6th Baronet, first President of the third Society

=== Third Society, 1873–present ===
The Society was revived for a second time in 1873, on the initiative of, among others, Hugh Owen, Henry Brinley Richards, and John Griffith ("Y Gohebydd"). Robert Jones of Rotherhithe subsequently also became a leading figure in its activities. Following in what was now a family tradition, Sir Watkin Williams-Wynn, 6th Baronet was made the first President.

The Society was prominent in the successful establishment of an annual National Eisteddfod of Wales, beginning in 1861; and took part in discussions that led to the establishment of University College Wales, Aberystwyth in 1872, and the National Museum and National Library of Wales in 1907. It published Y Bywgraffiadur Cymreig in 1953, and its English language counterpart, the Dictionary of Welsh Biography in 1959, as well as several supplements.

== Activities ==
The Society has its own publications, and holds lectures, all of which concern the native culture, language and literature of the Welsh. It formerly published the journal Y Cymmrodor (1823–43, 1877–1951), and a Record Series (13 volumes in 23 parts, 1892–1936). Its present journal is the Transactions of the Honourable Society of Cymmrodorion, which has been published regularly since 1897; and it also publishes other occasional volumes relating to historical sources. The journals are being digitised by the Welsh Journals Online project at the National Library of Wales.

The Society continues to be London-based but it also holds a number of meetings in Wales. A special lecture in Welsh is held each year at the National Eisteddfod of Wales, known as the Sir T. H. Parry-Williams Memorial Lecture, after the poet, author and academic who died in 1975.

== Ideology ==
The first society's motto was "Undeb a Brawdgarwch" ("Unity and Fraternity"). Reflecting the changing roles of the later incarnations, the motto of the second and third societies has been "Cared Doeth yr Encilion" ("Let the Wise Cherish Antiquity").

The Society has always been notably nondenominational and apolitical, which means it has had more in common with its counterparts in Scotland than with those in Ireland.

== Address ==
The Society's postal address is 157–63 Gray's Inn Road, London WC1X 8UE, the premises of the London Welsh Centre.

== Cultural references ==
Thomas Pennant's British Zoology was published in 1766 "under the auspices of the Cymmrodorion Society", and was "sold for the benefit of the British Charity-School on Clerkenwell Green". In fact the publication lost money, and so the school derived no direct benefit from it. Pennant did, however, independently give a donation of £100.

The Society is mentioned by Robert Graves in his autobiography, Good-Bye to All That (1929). He attended a meeting organised by the Cymmrodorion in April 1916, while on leave from the Western Front, to hear W. M. Hughes, then Prime Minister of Australia, and David Lloyd George, then Secretary of State for War, speak. Of Lloyd George he wrote: "The power of his rhetoric amazed me."

== Bibliography ==
- Ellis, Peter Berresford (1994) [1993]. Celt and Saxon The Struggle for Britain AD 410–937. London: Constable & Co. pp. 241–242. ISBN 0-09-473260-4.
- Jenkins, R. T.; Ramage, Helen M. (1951). A History of the Honourable Society of Cymmrodorion and of the Gwyneddigion and Cymreigyddion Societies (1751–1951). Y Cymmrodor. Vol. 50. London: Honourable Society of Cymmrodorion.
- Jones, Emrys, ed. (2001). The Welsh in London, 1500–2000. Cardiff: University of Wales Press. pp. 69–74. ISBN 0708317103.
- Morgan, Prys (2024). "The Cymmrodorion and Wales: the influence of the Honourable Society on Welsh institutions". Transactions of the Honourable Society of Cymmrodorion. 30: 53–68.
