= Parson's freehold =

Anglican ecclesiastical system

The parson's freehold refers to a system within the Church of England in which the rector or vicar of a parish holds title to benefice property, such as the church, churchyard or parsonage, the ownership passing to his successor. This system is to be phased out, under the Ecclesiastical Offices (Terms of Service) Measure 2009.

== Description ==
The parson's freehold is a type of benefice; originally also it established income from and tenancy of certain properties in recompense for the priest's exercise of ecclesiastical offices. These would have included occupancy of the rectory (and its outbuildings), fees and Easter offerings, income from tithes (received in the form of a tax on properties within the parish bounds), and income from the glebe (parcels which could be farmed for the rector's profit). These formed the basis for the rector's income, out of which he lived, and kept the Church. Communion alms met some of the needs of the poor. Often the patron or another landowner would take the lead in repairs and extensions of the church; sometimes the rector or vicar did so himself. For the purposes of law the rector owns the remaining property as a corporation sole. However, unlike usual fee simple ownership, the property did not pass to his heir upon his death. Instead, it passed to the next officeholder.

== Development ==
Canon law for benefices can be traced back to the councils of First and Second Councils of Orléans in 511 and 533, and Lyons in 566. The councils established the principle of grants of property to clergymen which were dependent upon the holding of particular offices. These principles were retained in the Church of England and were codified so that such a position was vacated only on

1. Death;
2. Resignation;
3. Cessation due to appointment to an incompatible position;
4. Deprivation through ecclesiastical courts on the grounds of bastardy or moral fault;
5. Conviction of simony; or
6. Failure to read services according to the Book of Common Prayer and sentence of deprivation.

Plural occupancy was gradually restricted due to abuses by non-resident officeholders delegating priestly duties to assistants.

The difficulty of removing the beneficiary of such a freehold was a source of continued conflict. In practice only "open and notorious evil living" sufficed to remove an incumbent unwillingly. Conflict over tithes in particular led to the fixing of tithes under the Tithe Commutation Act 1836, and their abolition in 1935. Increasingly rectors and vicars are not appointed, the right under which the patron makes a presentation of the living to his chosen candidate being suspended under section 67 of the pastoral measure 1983, and perhaps 3,500 clergy are consequently merely licensed by the bishop as priests-in-charge; although 5,500 rectors and vicars continue to enjoy freehold, but all are invited to relinquish the freehold and change to "common tenure" (to which all licensed clergy will automatically transfer in 2011). There is no contract, and no employment in any case: freeholders, licensed clergy, and those under common tenure are in law "office-holders".

== Abolition ==
On February 15, 2005, the General Synod of the Church of England decided to abolish the system of parson's freehold, gradually replacing it with a system entitled common tenure, which would apply to all clerics equally, removing the present distinction between those with freehold and those without. Under common tenure, the present proposal is that parsonages would pass to the diocese. Furthermore, such clergy would undergo assessment procedures to ensure that they are performing their function adequately, and parishioners would have further rights to those enjoyed under the Clergy Discipline Measure to complain about their parish priests. If found unsatisfactory, it would be possible to remove such priests with greater ease. However, priests will be entitled to some modest compensation for loss of office, and gain the right of appeal to secular employment tribunals.

The Ecclesiastical Offices (Terms of Service) Measure 2009 (No. 1), giving effect to these changes, is now in force.
