= Geology of Ceredigion =

Overview of geology in Ceredigion, Wales

The bedrock geology of Ceredigion (formerly Cardiganshire) in west Wales consists wholly of a considerable thickness of Ordovician and Silurian age sedimentary rocks of marine origin. Unconsolidated (or 'superficial') deposits of Quaternary age include a widespread cover of glacial till, valley floor alluvium and scattered peat deposits in both upland and lowland settings.

== Ordovician ==
The oldest rocks exposed at the surface within Ceredigion are those of Ordovician age in the southwest and in the far northeast of the county. It is the Ashgillian age Nantmel Mudstones which form the rocky coast between Gwbert and Aberporth and including Cardigan Island whilst the overlying Yr Allt Formation forms the cliffs either side of Llangrannog and including Ynys Lochtyn. Both are mudstone-dominated successions but include abundant sandstones. The Yr Allt succession extends east to Llanybydder though is less well exposed inland. Rocks of Ashgillian age are also found in the north of the county, to the northeast of Ponterwyd and to the east of Furnace where the mudstones and sandstones of the Bryn-glas, Drosgol and Nant-y-Moch formations are exposed.

== Silurian ==
Folded and faulted Llandovery age sandstones and mudstones of the Trefechan and Mynydd Bach formations, combined as the Aberystwyth Grits Group, are exposed in the coastal cliffs southfrom Borth to Cwmtydu southwest of New Quay. Inland of these are the poorly exposed outcrops of the Borth Mudstones and Adail Mudstones formations reaching from the Dyfi estuary via Borth south to Lledrod then southwest to the Ystrad Aeron area. Further inland again are the mudstones and sandstones of the Devil's Bridge Formation, reaching from the northernmost parts of the county south via Devil's Bridge and southwest via Tregaron to cross into Carmarthenshire at Lampeter, with a westward extension to Talgarreg. The mudstones of the Derwenlas and Rhayader Mudstones formations, combined as the Claerwen Group occur in a band of country from the coast north of Llangrannog in a broken and wavering line east via Talgarrog to Llanybydder on the county boundary and also as an inlier at Pontrhydfendigaid, bounded to the north by a branch of the Wyre Fault running along the Ystwyth valley.

The extreme east and the southeast of the county is underlain by the sandstones and mudstones variously of the Rhuddnant Grits, Pysgotwr Grits, Dolgau Mudstones, Glanyrafon, Doethie Mudstones, Caerau Mudstones and Nant Brianne formations of Llandovery age. In the southwest from Llangrannog and Llanybydder west to Cardigan are the sandstones and mudstones of the Allt Goch Sandstone and Cwmere formations. Between Ynys Lochtyn and Cwm Ty-du the coastal cliffs are formed successively in the Cwmere and Allt Goch formations, the Claerwen Group and the sandstones and mudstones of the Erwan Fach Formation.

== Geological structure ==
Numerous faults parallel to the gently curving coast of Cardigan Bay affect the strata. Key amongst them are the Carrog Valley, Aber Richard, Mynydd Bach, Bronnant, Teifi and Claerwen faults. Aligned at an angle to these are a prominent set of faults entering the county via Cwm Ystwyth and continuing west-southwest along the line of the Afon Wyre to the coast at Llanrhystud. It is principally on these cross-cutting lines in the northeast of Ceredigion that the mineralisation described below has taken place.

== Quaternary ==
Ongoing coastal processes and the legacy of the ice ages provide considerable interest in the county. Of particular note too is one of Britain's finest examples of river headwater capture at Devils' Bridge. The uppermost reaches of the early Teifi were captured first by the Ystwyth and at some later time by the Rheidol leaving small 'misfit' streams in larger valleys to the south of the capture points.

=== Glacial legacy ===
The county was over-run by both 'Welsh ice' and 'Irish Sea ice' during the course of the last glaciation. The former derives from cumulative snowfall on the Welsh mountains whilst much of the latter had a more distant provenance and moved onshore from Cardigan Bay. The lower courses of the Ystwyth and Rheidol are seen to be glacial in origin (or at least glacially modified) together with sections of the Aeron and Teifi valleys amongst others. Numerous glacial meltwater channels have been identified by geologists, particularly inland of both Aberystwyth and of New Quay and Llangrannog. Cwm-du and Cwm Tinwen are large concave features on the south side of Cwm Ystwyth resembling glacial cirques but which are regarded as nivation cirques. In the valleys of the Nant Cledlyn and Nant Cletwr are collections of ramparted depressions which have traditionally been interpreted as pingos originating through periglacial processes though alternative interpretations as lithalsas or as products of glaciation have also been proposed.

A prominent offshore feature which is interpreted as a glacial legacy is Sarn Gynfelyn, a shingle spit which stretches straight out from the shore at Wallog. The southernmost of three such features, they are seen to be medial moraines, left between lobes of 'Welsh ice' extending down valleys.

=== Post-glacial deposits ===
Landslips are mapped in the Cardigan area and have occurred in coastal cliffs of unconsolidated sediments east of New Quay. Major valleys are typically floored by alluvium (sand, silt, gravel and pebbles) and in the Teifi valley are river terraces left as the river cut down into its earlier floodplain. Alluvial fans are frequently encountered. Peat deposits at Cors Caron near Tregaron represent the most intact raised bog in Wales and is amongst the largest such features in Britain.

=== Coastal deposits ===
Storm beaches are present along the coast at Borth and across the bays at Clarach and Aberystwyth. The remains of a submerged forest are evident at Borth, drowned by rising sea levels in the post-glacial period. A substantial area of blown sand lies behind the storm beach and inland of that is the extensive area of peatland forming the Dyfi National Nature Reserve at Ynyslas.

== Economic geology ==
Sandstone is worked at Tylau Quarry at Lampeter, at Ystrad Meurig quarry, at Gwarallt Quarry, Talgarreg and at Bryn & Alltgoch quarries at Llanybydder. Clay and/or shale are worked at Cwar Esgair Newydd at Tresaith and at Moelfryn Maen Quarry, Bethania. Sand and gravel continue to be exploited at various sites including Penparc quarry near Cardigan, at Crug yr Eryr, Aberaeron, Glanyrafon near Aberystwyth and at Pant Quarry at Llanddewi Brefi.

=== Metalliferous minerals ===
The Central Wales Orefield lies between Pontryhdfendigaid in the south and Glandyfi in the north (and extends eastwards into Powys). Within mineralised veins along various east–west aligned faults, lead has been obtained from galena whilst blende has provided zinc. Silver, manganese (in the form of psilomelane) and barium are also present. It is probable that copper and gold were being mined during the Bronze Age at Copa Hill, Cwmystwyth. Monks from Strata Florida Abbey are thought to have been involved in lead mining during Mediaeval times. Most mines were operated from the late 17th through to the 19th centuries though it is likely there was also some activity during Roman times. Cwmystwyth and Ystumtuen were major mining localities, as too were Llancynfelyn, Tre-Taliesin and Tal-y-bont between Machynlleth and Aberystwyth. The remains of mines can be found scattered in the vicinity of Nant-y-moch Reservoir and also at Goginan, Cwmsymlog and Pen-bont Rhydybeddau and the Pont-rhyd-y-groes area. A mine museum (Silver Mountain Experience) is in operation near Ponterwyd.

=== Building stone ===
Building stone was sourced historically in a cluster of quarries opened in the Aberystwyth Grits around Aberystwyth. Trichrug quarry north of Trefilan worked the Mynydd Bach Formation sandstones and a couple of quarries beside the river at Llandyssul exploited Ordovician sandstones for building purposes.

== Geoconservation ==
Numerous sites are protected as SSSIs whilst some RIGS are also identified and within which structured conservation activity takes place. Just under 34 km of the coastline is defined as heritage coast in recognition of the quality of its landscape which is owed principally to its geology. Underpinning the wildlife interest of the Dyfi National Nature Reserve is the assemblage of post-glacial geological features including sand dunes, mud flats and raised bog.

== See also ==
- Geology of the United Kingdom
- Geology of Wales
