= Dyfi Biosphere =

Biosphere reserve in Mid Wales

Coordinates: 52.3200°N 4.0000°W

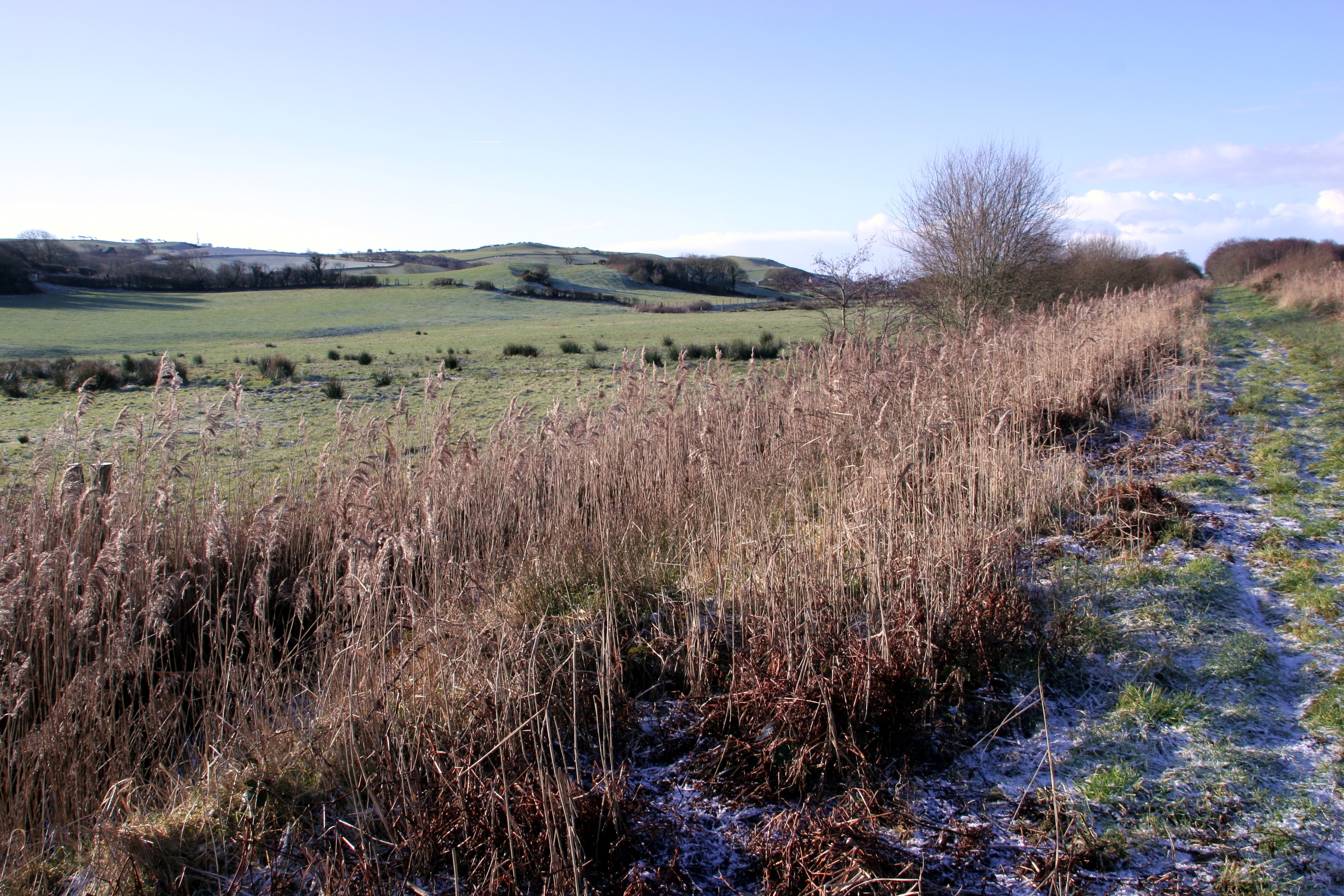
A general view of the path running along the southern edge of Cors Fochno and alongside Pwll Du which is hidden in the rushes.

The Dyfi Biosphere (Welsh: Biosffer Dyfi) is situated at the coast of south-central Wales in the estuary of the River Dyfi, and is a biosphere reserve representative of salt marshes and estuarine systems in the west of the United Kingdom. The estuary forms one of the most important wildfowl and shorebird centres in Wales and also comprises a Ramsar site.

Cors Fochno has a large expanse of primary raised mire and contains a high number of invertebrate species, including some of national and international importance. Upstream along the Dyfi Valley are remnants of native oak woodland. The site was declared in 1977, and covers an area of 1,589 hectares.

== Human activities ==
Human activities in the area include pastoral farming and forestry, tourism and outdoor recreation, sustainable living and technology development; natural resource rehabilitation, management and monitoring; environmental education and interpretation and cultural development.

== Ecological characteristics ==
The Dyfi is a post-glacial catchment of predominantly hill land with thin, acidic soils developed on lower Palaeozoic sedimentary strata. Broadleaf woodlands, typically sessile oak or ash dominated, are a feature of the valley slopes and its many tributaries, although conifer plantations now dominate large areas. The bryophyte, lichen and fern communities of the shady, damp valley woods are particularly notable, with large numbers of Atlantic species. Several areas of upland moorland occur, comprising mixtures of acid grassland, blanket bog and dwarf shrub heath, often contiguous with larger upland areas and supporting important bird populations.

The Dyfi is a classic bar-built estuary, and one of the foremost examples of a drying, sandy, nutrient-poor estuary. Important populations of migratory fish, birds and otter occur along with extensive areas of saltmarsh (Atlantic salt meadow). The spit dune system of Ynyslas is an actively accreting system with good representation of dune community succession including marram fore-dunes and humid dune slacks. The estuarine raised mire of Cors fochno is one of the largest and best preserved active raised bogs in the UK. It is a key site for climate-related research and supports important assemblages of lower plants, invertebrates and birds.

== Protection classifications ==
National:

- National Nature Reserve
- Site of Special Scientific Interest

== Sources ==
This article incorporates text from a free content work (license statement/permission). Text taken from UNESCO - MAB Biosphere Reserves Directory, UNESCO, UNESCO.
