= Animal Kingdom =

Animal Kingdom may refer to:

== Animals ==
- Animal or the kingdom Animalia, a classification of living organisms
- Animal Kingdom (horse), winner of the 2011 Kentucky Derby

== Places ==
- Disney's Animal Kingdom, a theme park at Walt Disney World, Florida, U.S.
  - Animal Kingdom Resort Area, a group of resorts near the theme park

== Arts, entertainment, and media ==
=== Films ===
- The Animal Kingdom (1932 film), an American comedy-drama film based on the 1932 play
  - One More Tomorrow (film), an alternate title for the 1946 remake of the 1932 film
- Animal Kingdom (film), a 2010 Australian crime film
- Animal Kingdom: Let's Go Ape, a 2013 Belgian-French-Italian CGI-animated film
- The Animal Kingdom (2023 film), a French science fiction adventure film

=== Literature ===
- Animal Kingdom, A Crime Story, a 2010 novel by Stephen Sewell, based on the 2010 Australian film
- The Animal Kingdom, a 1932 play by Philip Barry
- The Animal Kingdom, a 2018 book by Randal Ford

=== Music ===
- Animal Kingdom (band), a UK indie rock band
- Animal Kingdom, a 2008 album by Baseball
- Animal Kingdom, a 2010 album by Raptile
- Animal Kingdom, a 2019 album by Cavetown

=== Television ===
- Animal Kingdom (TV series), an American television series on TNT inspired by the Australian film
- Animal Kingdom, original title of the American TV series Animal World
- Animal Kingdom (TV program), or Kingdom of Animals, a documentary program on the Korean Broadcasting System

== See also ==
- Animal World (disambiguation)
- Wild kingdom (disambiguation)
- Wild Kingdom, an American television show that features wildlife and nature
- "Kingdom of the Animals", a song by Iron & Wine from the album Around the Well
