= Y Borth =

Y Borth may refer to:

- Borth, a village in north Ceredigion
- Menai Bridge, a town on Anglesey whose Welsh name Porthaethwy is commonly abbreviated to Y Borth as in Ffair Y Borth
