= The Visitors' List and Guide =

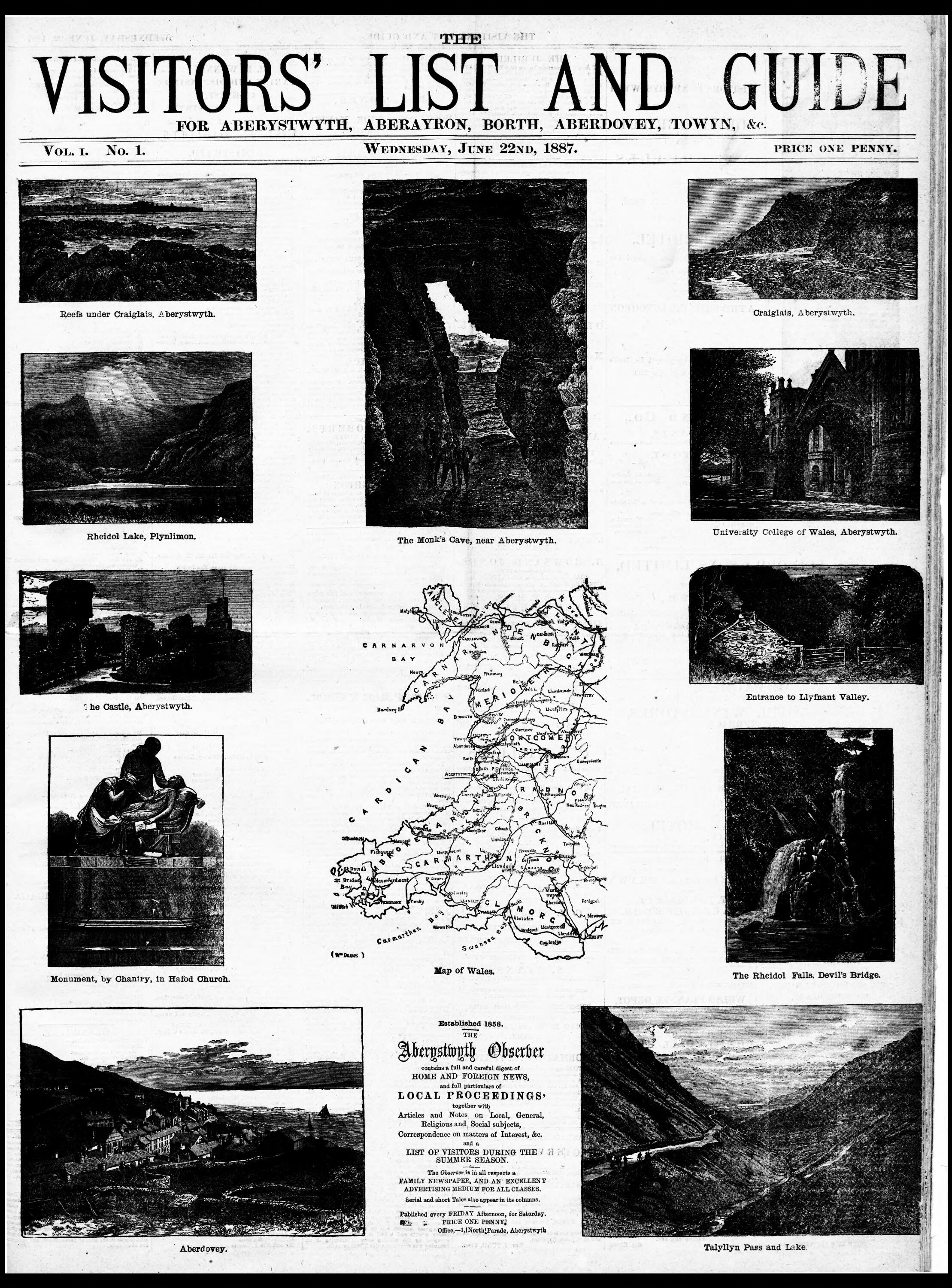
- Title page of the earliest surviving edition of The Visitor's List and Guide. June 22 1887
- Type: newspaper

The Visitors' List and Guide was a weekly English language newspaper, distributed around settlements on the mid West Wales coast such as Aberystwyth, Borth, Aberdyfi, Tywyn and Aberaeron. It contained local news and information and a list of visitors.
