= Wild kingdom =

Wild kingdom refers to wilderness.

It may also refer to:

== Places ==
- Wild Kingdom Train, Lagoon Amusement Park, Farmington, Utah, US
  - Wild Kingdom Train Zoo
- The Wild Kingdom Pavilion, Henry Doorly Zoo and Aquarium, Omaha, Nebraska, US

== Arts and entertainment ==
=== Television ===
- Mutual of Omaha's Wild Kingdom (TV series; also airing as Wild Kingdom), a wildlife and nature documentary TV show that started airing in 1963
- Wild Kingdom (video), a 2014 JAV release for AV Open

==== Episodes ====
- "Wild Kingdom" (Home Improvement), a 1991 TV episode of Home Improvement
- "Wild Kingdom" (North Woods Law), a 2015 TV episode of North Woods Law
- "Wild Kingdom" (Carmilla), a 2015 TV episode of web series Carmilla; see List of Carmilla episodes
- "Wild Kingdom" (Dick Figures), a 2015 webisode of Dick Figures; see List of Dick Figures episodes

=== Music ===
==== Bands ====
- Manitoba's Wild Kingdom (band) (formerly "Wild Kingdom"), a NYC based rock band
- Wild Kingdom (band), a successor band to Human Sexual Response (band)

==== Albums ====
- Wild Kingdom (album), a 2017 album by Cotton Mather
- Wild Kingdom (album), a 2019 album by The Hot Club of Cowtown

==== Songs ====
- "Wild Kingdom" (song), a 1999 track by Dr. Dooom off the album First Come, First Served
- "Wild Kingdom" (song), a 1998 song by 2 Skinnee J's off the album SuperMercado!
- "Wild Kingdom" (song), a 1986 song by Alex Chilton

=== Literature ===
- "Wild Kingdom" (story), a 1988 short story by Tom Perrotta

==== Comics ====
- Wild Kingdom (comic book), a comic book published by MU Press
- Wild Kingdom (comic book), a Japanese serialized manga comic book by Johji Manabe
- "Wild Kingdom" (comic book), a Marvel Comics story arc written by Peter Milligan; see Peter Milligan bibliography
- "The Wild Kingdom" (chapter), a serialized chapter of the Japanese manga comic book Hayate the Combat Butler; see List of Hayate the Combat Butler chapters

== See also ==
- "Wild, Wild Kingdom" (segment), a 1985 segment of You Can't Do That on Television; see List of You Can't Do That on Television episodes
- Ron Levy's Wild Kingdom (band), a band formed by Ron Levy
- Borth Wild Animal Kingdom, Borth, Wales, UK; a zoo
- York's Wild Kingdom, York Beach, Maine, USA
- Wild Cartoon Kingdom (magazine)
- Animal Kingdom (disambiguation)
- Kingdom (disambiguation)
- Wild (disambiguation)
