= Michael Oliver (cardiologist) =

British cardiologist

Michael Oliver CBE FRCP FRSE
- Born: 3 July 1925; Borth, Wales
- Died: 7 June 2015 (aged 89); Siena, Italy
- Education: Marlborough College
- Alma mater: University of Edinburgh
- Occupation: Cardiologist
- Employer: University of Edinburgh

Michael Francis Oliver (1925–2015) was a British cardiologist who served as president of the Royal College of Physicians of Edinburgh for the period 1985 to 1988. He made major advances in identifying the causes of heart disease.

The Michael Oliver Theatre, at Glasgow University, is named in his honour.

== Life ==
Oliver was born at Borth (near Aberystwyth), Wales on 3 July 1925, to Cecilia, née Daniel, and Wilfred Oliver MC. He was educated at Marlborough College, then studied biochemistry and physiology at the University of Edinburgh, graduating MB ChB in 1947, with first-class honours.

He spent some time in general practice but returned to Edinburgh to research physiology and biochemistry of heart disease. In 1958 he teamed up with Desmond Julian, then working at the Edinburgh Royal Infirmary, to set up Europe's first coronary care unit, which came to fruition in 1966.

From 1976 to 1989, he was Duke of Edinburgh Professor of Cardiology at the University of Edinburgh, becoming Emeritus on retirement.

He served as president of the British Cardiac Society from 1980 to 1984; as president of the Royal College of Physicians of Edinburgh from 1986 to 1988; and as director of the Wynn Institute for Metabolic Research from 1990 to 1994.

He was made a Commander of the Order of the British Empire (CBE) in the 1985 New Year Honours. He was also a Fellow of the Royal College of Physicians (FRCP) and a Fellow of the Royal Society of Edinburgh (FRSE). In 1954 he was elected a member of the Harveian Society of Edinburgh. In 1971 he was elected a member of the Aesculapian Club. He was awarded honorary MDs by Karolinska University in 1980 and the University of Bologna in 1985.

In 1985 he succeeded Ronald Haxton Girdwood as president of the Royal College of Physicians of Edinburgh.

He retired to London in 1989.

He died of a heart attack in his holiday home in Siena, Italy on 7 June 2015

== Family ==
He was married twice. He had a daughter and three sons by his first marriage, to Margaret Abbey. Following divorce, in 1985 he married Helen Daniel.

== Artistic recognition ==
His portrait by Victoria Crowe is held by the Royal College of Physicians of Edinburgh.

== Publications ==
- Pioneer Research in Britain into Atherosclerosis and Coronary Heart Disease (2000)
- Consensus or Nonsensus Conferences on Coronary Heart Disease (1985)
