= Dyfi Estuary Mudflats =

Mudflats in Ceredigion, Wales

Coordinates: 52.538°N 4°W

Designations

Ramsar Wetland
- Official name: Cors Fochno & Dyfi
- Designated: 5 January 1976
- Reference no.: 66

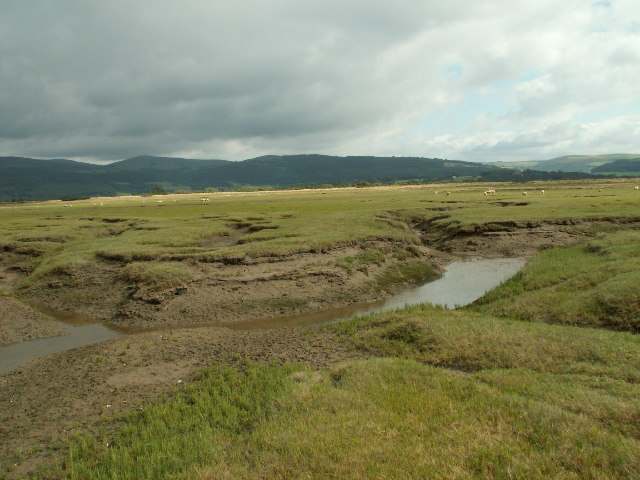
Sheep at the Dyfi estuary raised for salt marsh lamb

Dyfi Estuary Mudflats are mudflats on the estuary of the River Dyfi in Ceredigion, Wales, and are part of the Dyfi National Nature Reserve.

== Ecology ==
The Dyfi Estuary is located on the conjunction of the counties of Ceredigion, Gwynedd and Powys. The area is designated a Special Protection Area (SPA), a protected site for wild birds under the EC Birds Directive. The area comprises the estuary and adjoining salt marsh and includes sandbanks, mudflats, peat bogs, river channels, meanders and creeks, with an extensive sand dune complex across the mouth of the estuary at Ynyslas.

A large part of the western shore is owned and managed by the RSPB. The site is an established wintering area for Greenland white-fronted geese, this area being the most southerly regularly used the UK.

The estuary is also a feeding ground for large numbers of dunlin, oystercatcher, sanderling, Manx shearwater and terns.
