= Afon Leri =

River in Wales

Coordinates: 52.5199°N 4.040404°W

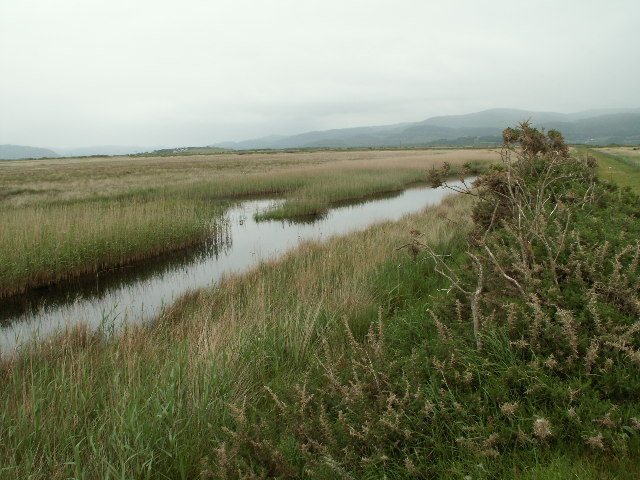
- Afon Leri near Aberleri, Ynyslas

Location
- Country: Wales
- Region: Ceredigion

Physical characteristics
- Mouth
  - location: River Dyfi
- Discharge
  - location: River Dyfi

Afon Leri (Welsh pronunciation: [ˈlɛri]; also known as the River Leri) is a river in Ceredigion, Wales. It rises at Llyn Craig-y-Pistyll and is joined at Talybont by Afon Ceulan before passing behind Borth to its mouth in the Dyfi estuary at Ynyslas.

The river once flowed into Cardigan Bay at Aberleri, to the south of Ynyslas. In 1824, its route was diverted to provide a harbour for the local shipbuilding industry.

In June 2012, the Leri was affected by serious flooding causing property damage in Talybont, Dolybont and Borth following torrential rain in the area.
