= The Square Festival =

Welsh music festival (2005–2009)

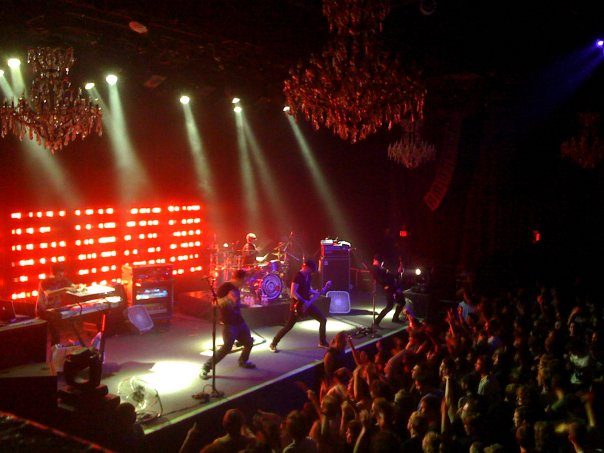
- Pendulum playing live
- Genre: Folk / Psychedelia / Dance / Americana / Indie
- Dates: 24–26 July (3 days)
- Locations: Borth, Ceredigion, Mid Wales
- Years active: 2005-2009
- Website: The Square Festival

The Square Festival was an annual music festival held in Borth, Ceredigion, Mid Wales. It was originally set up in 2005, as a small festival for the village. In 2008 it grew to become a commercial festival for up to 3,000 people over two days. In 2009 the organisers hosted the festival over three days with a capacity for 5,000 people. The festival was not held in 2010 due to licensing and financial issues, and has not been held since.

== 2008 ==
In its first year as a commercial venture, The Square Festival was held on 26 and 27 July and was attended by almost 2,900 people. It had four stages hosting over 40 acts, with Pendulum and Alabama 3 headlining the main stage on Saturday and Sunday respectively.

Due to the success of 2008, organisers planned to increase the capacity of the festival for future years.

== 2009 ==
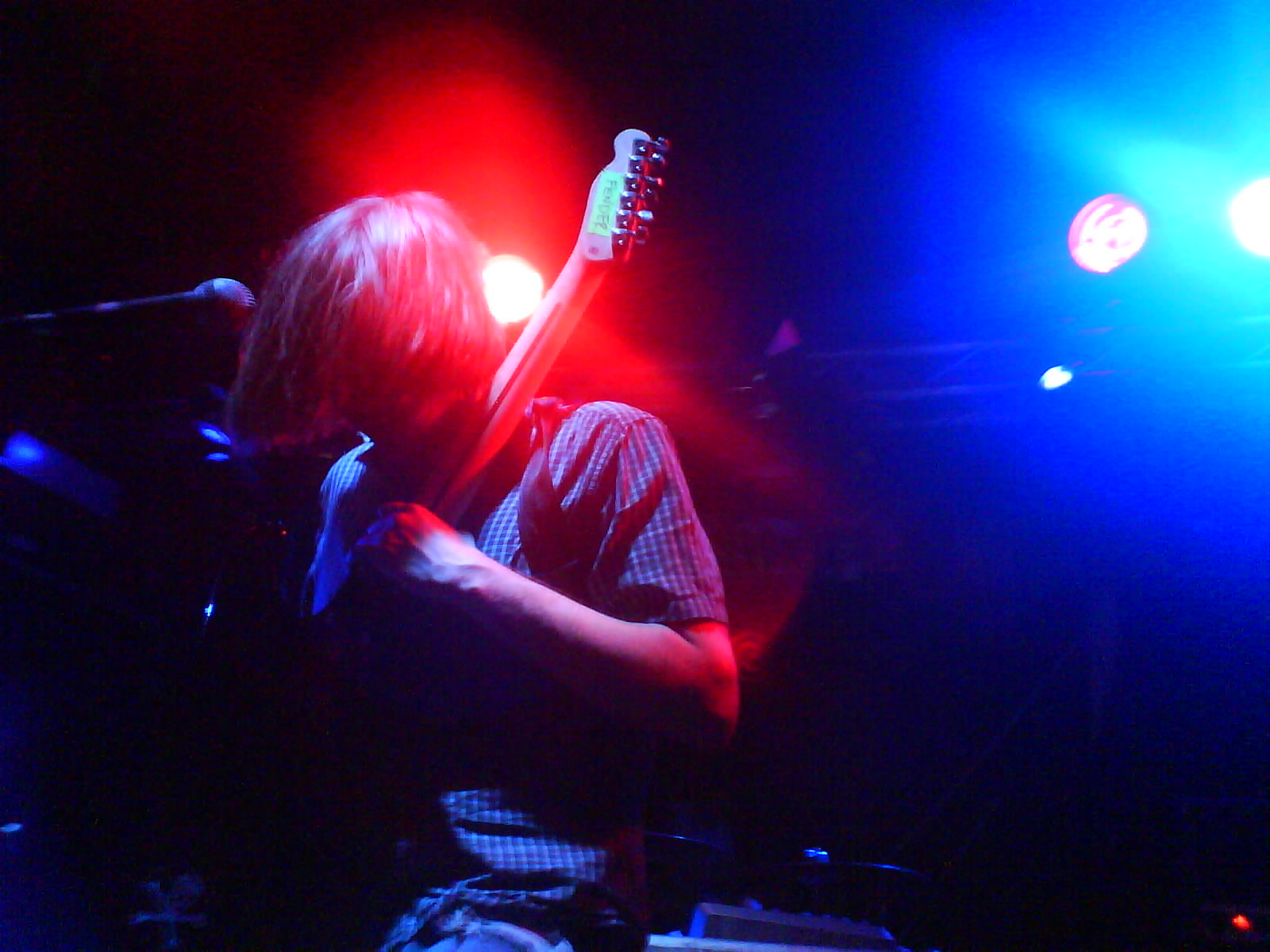
65daysofstatic live in Cork, Ireland on 4 November 2007.

The 2009 festival took place on 24–26 July on the same site as the previous year. Over three days the festival had five stages, including one dedicated to new music from Welsh bands. The Main stage was headlined by Supergrass and The Holloways on the Friday, Skindred and 65 Days of Static on the Saturday, and The Beat on the Sunday.

As well as music, the 2009 festival planned to include a Human Zoo, a clothes swap shop, a Man Made island for Hammocks and an attempt to break the World Record for most people skinny dipping at one time, however due to financial and organisational constraints none of this was possible.

== 2010 ==
The festival was not held in 2010, after losing its licence amid concerns over safety, crime and disorder. The festival organizers also announced that they were in financial difficulty.
