= Animal World =

Animal World or The Animal World may refer to:

- Animal World (short story collection), by Antonio di Benedetto
- Animal World (TV series), 1968–1971 wildlife program
- Animal World (film), a 2018 Chinese adventure action film
- The Animal World (film), a 1956 documentary film directed by Irwin Allen
- Animal World (song), a 2017 song by Joker Xue
- "The Animal World", a song by Grandaddy from their 2006 album Just Like the Fambly Cat

== See also ==
- Animal Kingdom (disambiguation)
- Animal Planet, a television network
