= Ynyslas =

Village in Ceredigion, Wales

Coordinates: 52.512°N 4.052°W

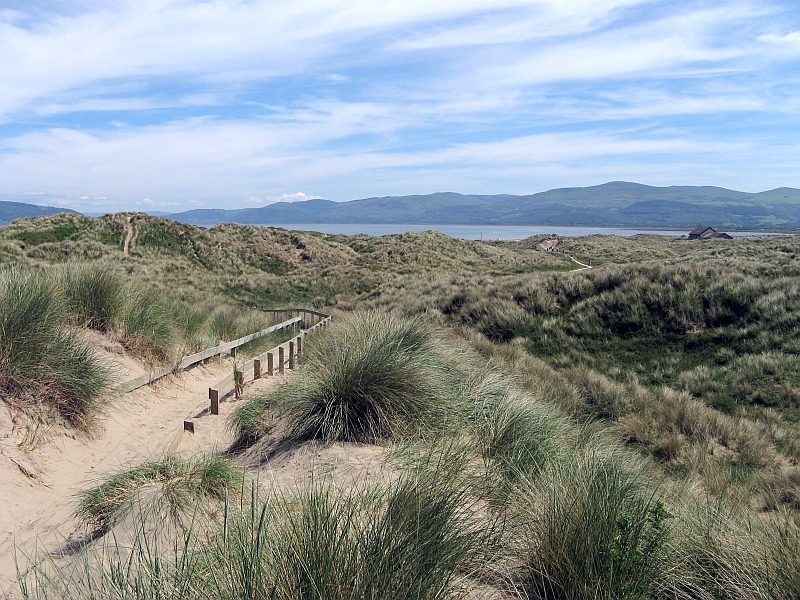
- Ynyslas Sand Dunes, June 2008

- Location within Ceredigion
- OS grid reference: SN 6082 9247
  - Cardiff: 78.6 mi (126.5 km)
- Community: Borth
- Principal area: Ceredigion
- Preserved county: Dyfed
- Country: Wales
- Sovereign state: United Kingdom
- Post town: BORTH
- Postcode district: SY24
- Dialling code: 01970
- Police: Dyfed-Powys
- Fire: Mid and West Wales
- Ambulance: Welsh
- Senedd Cymru – Welsh Parliament: Ceredigion Penfro

Ynyslas (Welsh for 'green island'; Welsh pronunciation: [ənɪsˈlas]) is a small village about 1.5 miles (2.4 km) north of Borth and 8 miles (13 km) north of Aberystwyth, within the county of Ceredigion, Wales. It is sandwiched between a long sandy beach in Cardigan Bay and the beach in the Dyfi Estuary. The area between the sea and the estuary beach is made up of the Ynyslas Sand Dunes which are part of the Dyfi National Nature Reserve and home to many rare plants and animals. The sands of the estuary beach can be driven onto and parked upon. The nature reserve has a visitor centre with toilets.

The northern end of the Ceredigion Coast Path extends to the Dyfi National Nature Reserve at Ynyslas.

== Ecology ==
The Dyfi National Nature Reserve and the Ynyslas Sand Dunes are situated where the mouth of the Afon Leri joins the Dyfi Estuary at Ynyslas. Cors Fochno is situated to the east beyond the Afon Leri. At low tide the remains of an ancient submerged forest with stumps of petrified oak, pine, birch, willow and hazel are exposed on the beach.

== Railway ==
From 1867 Ynyslas had a railway station on the Cambrian Railways, with sidings serving the riverside wharves. The Plynlimon and Hafan Tramway proposed to create a narrow-gauge line to the wharves in the 1890s but this was never built. Ynyslas railway station was closed by the London Midland Region of British Railways on 14 June 1965.

== Recreation ==
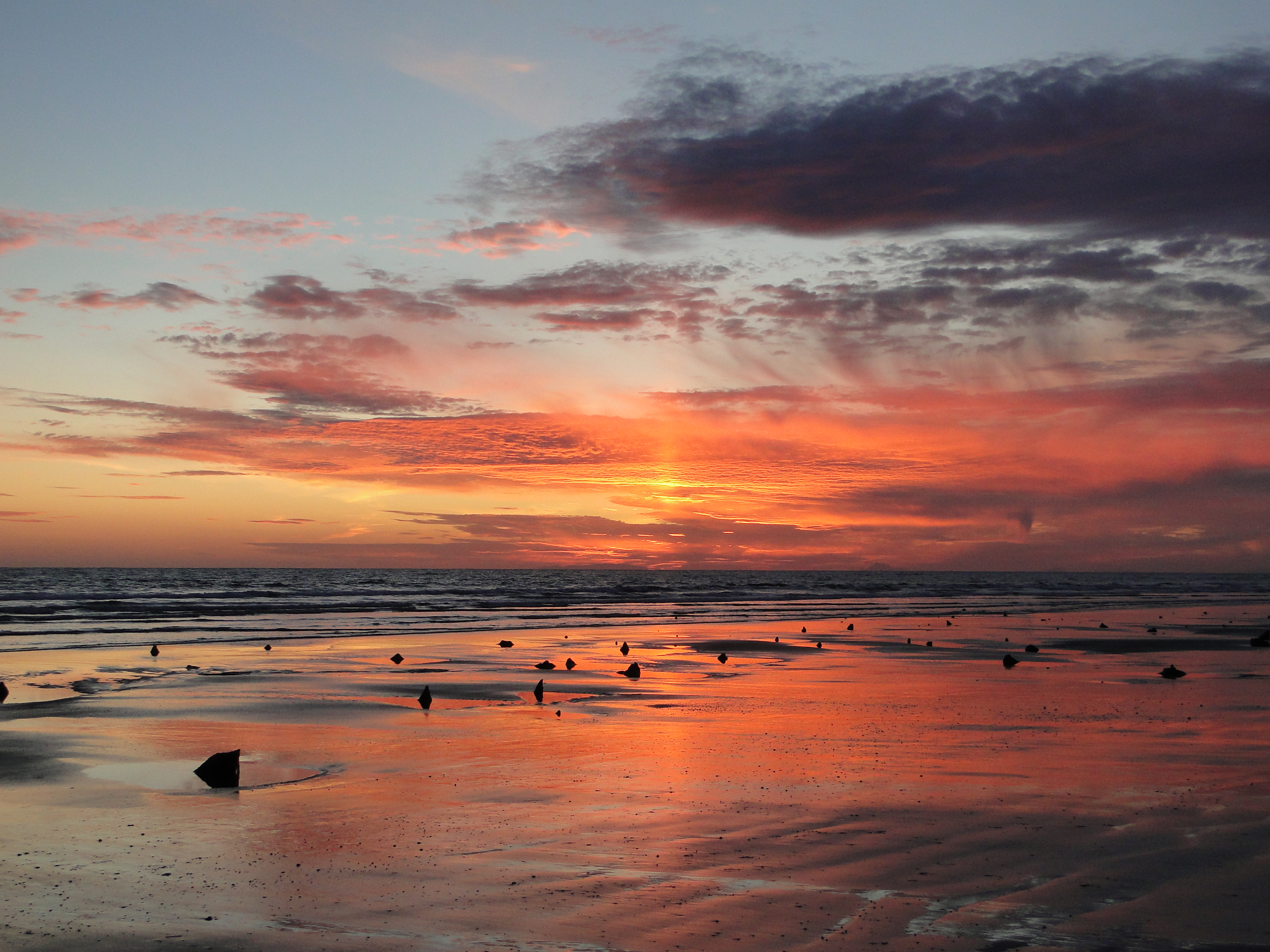
Submerged forest stumps exposed on Borth sands near Ynyslas at low tide

Borth Rowing Club stores its boat at, and launches from the Ynyslas Boatyard on the banks of the Afon Leri.

The 18 hole golf course at the Borth & Ynyslas Golf Club stretches from Borth to Ynyslas.

Swimming is not allowed at Ynyslas in the sea or estuary, due to the dangerously strong currents.

Between 2006 and 2016, kite flyers at Ynyslas Sand Dunes were featured in one of the idents used on BBC One.

Ynyslas was the home of the Aberystwyth Beach Cricket Society, under the name the Ynyslas Oval.

== See also ==
- Ynyslas Sand Dunes
