= Upper Borth =

Village in Ceredigion, Wales

Coordinates: 52°28′N 4°04′W

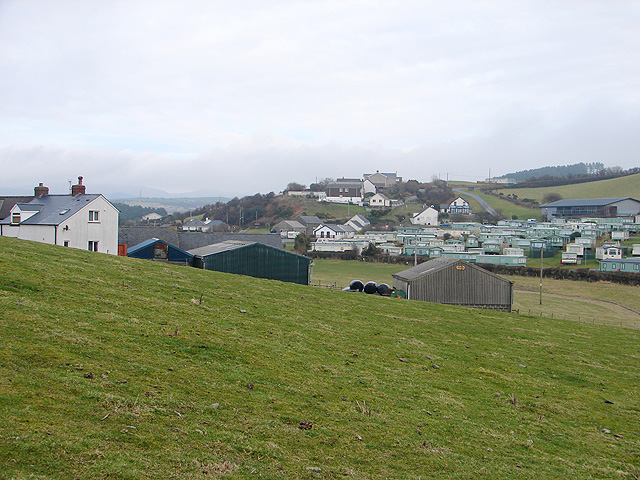
Caravans at Penygraig, upper Borth

Upper Borth (Welsh: Y Borth Uchaf) is a village in Ceredigion, Wales, part of Borth.
