= Dyfi National Nature Reserve =

Nature reserve in Ceredigion, Wales

- IUCN category IV (habitat/species management area)
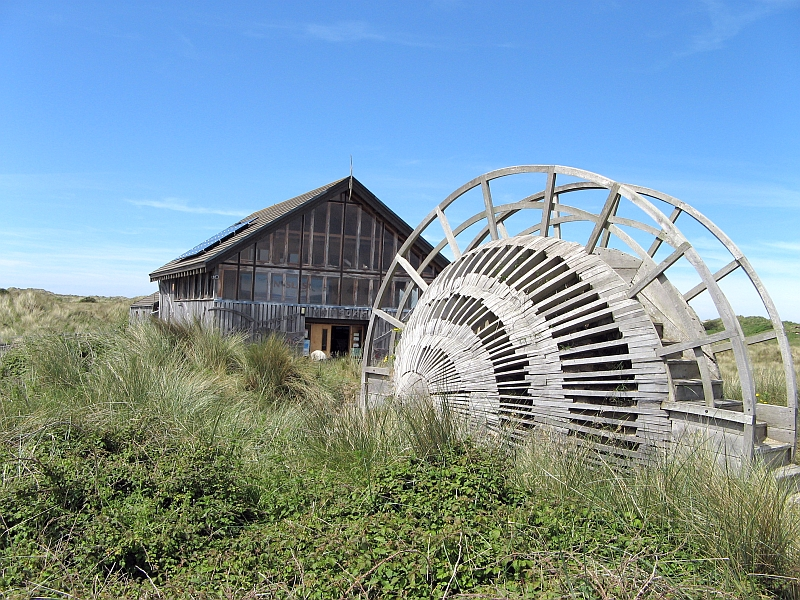
- Dyfi National Nature Reserve visitor centre

- Location within Wales Location within the United Kingdom
- Coordinates: 52°31′37″N 4°03′05″W

Ramsar Wetland
- Official name: Cors Fochno & Dyfi
- Designated: 5 January 1976
- Reference no.: 66

The Dyfi National Nature Reserve, managed by Natural Resources Wales, the successor body to the Countryside Council for Wales, is located 7 miles (11 km) north of Aberystwyth in the county of Ceredigion, Wales on the Dyfi estuary.

The area was designated as a Nature Reserve in 1969 and consists of three separate areas:

- Ynyslas Sand Dunes
- Dyfi Estuary Mudflats
- Cors Fochno

== See also ==
- Borth
- Ynyslas
- Ynys-hir RSPB reserve
