= Desmond Julian =

British cardiologist (1926–2019)

Desmond Gareth Julian (24 April 1926 – 26 December 2019) was a British cardiologist who pioneered the creation of coronary care units.

== Life ==
He was professor of cardiology at Newcastle University (1975–86), medical director of the British Heart Foundation (1986–93) and president of the British Cardiovascular Society (1985–87).

== Awards ==
Julian received the European Society of Cardiology's gold medal.
