= Borth Animalarium =

Animalarium, Borth Zoo
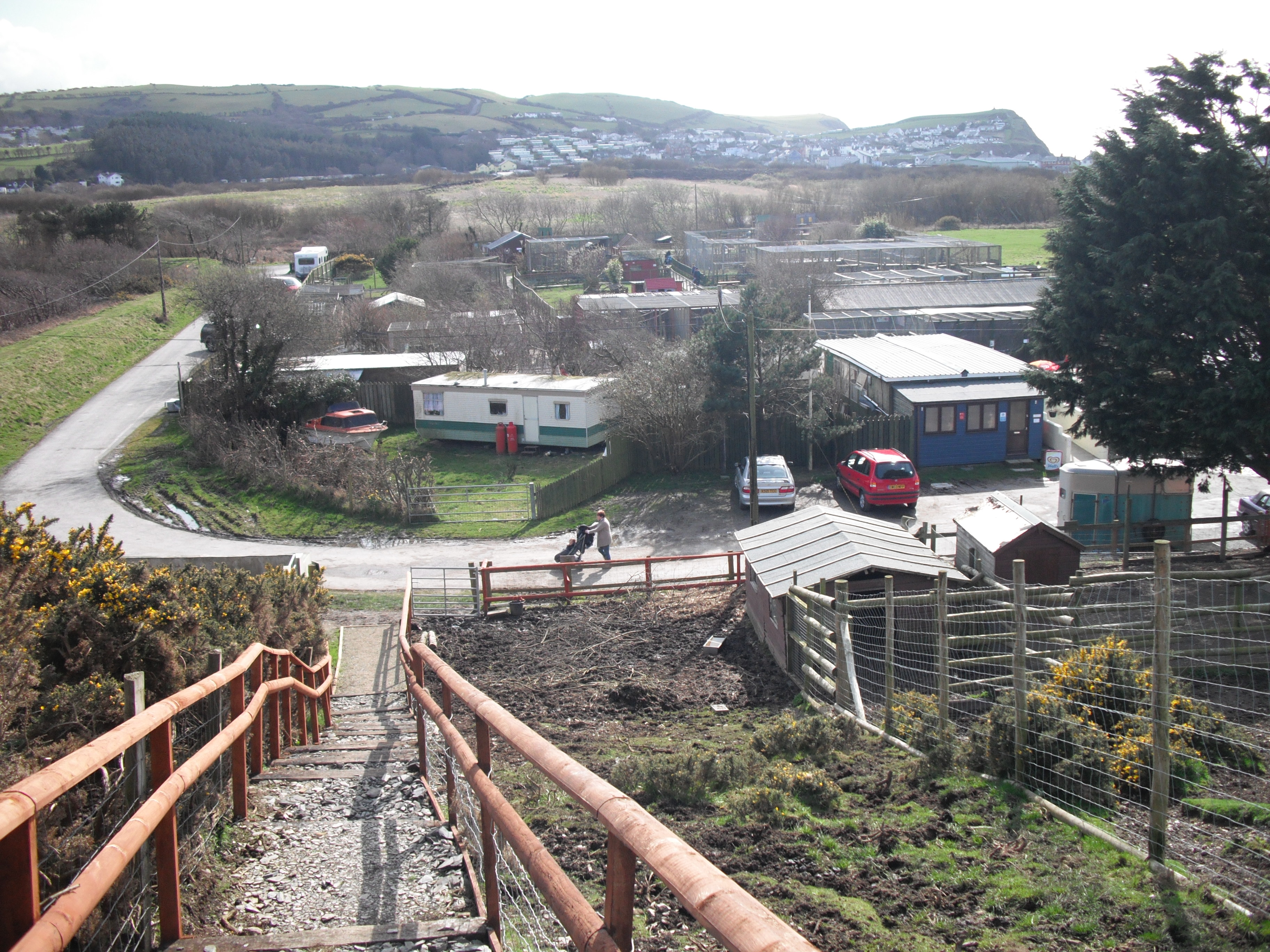
- Interactive map of Animalarium, Borth Zoo
- 52°29′08″N 4°02′38″W
- Date opened: 2000
- Location: Borth, Wales
- Land area: 12
- No. of animals: 400
- No. of species: 120
- Owner: Tweedy Family
- Website: https://www.borthzoo.co.uk

Borth Animalarium, formerly known as Borth Wild Animal Kingdom, is a zoo, located in the seaside Welsh town of Borth, 7 miles north of Aberystwyth in the county of Ceredigion, Mid Wales. It occupies 12 acres and in 2015 had some 27,000 visitors..

== History ==
Borth Animalarium was opened in the late 1980s at Ynys Fergi, half a mile from Borth town centre, by Ron and Ann Crowther. Starting as a hobby, the zoo expanded gradually into a business, concentrating on breeding of animals for conservation, working closely with Chester Zoo and the Northern Zoological Society on breeding programmes for harvest mice and capybara. The zoo was sold in 2000 to Jean and Alan Mumbray who ran it for 15 years before announcing that they were putting it up for sale in June 2015.

Early in the zoo's history, it made the news when a capybara escaped and was found in the River Leri.

The zoo was bought in early 2017 by Dean and Tracy Tweedy, an artist and psychotherapist couple from Milton Regis in Kent, who planned to use the facility for animal therapy, making it a sanctuary for both animals and people. Their purchase of the zoo was covered in a three part report on BBC's The One Show in September 2017. On transfer of ownership, the zoo is stated to have been in need of significant improvement to bring it up to modern zoo standards, with the lynx enclosure particularly being not fit for purpose.

The zoo was the subject of a three programme BBC television series called Saving Britain's Worst Zoo. The series aired in July and August 2019.

== Animal exhibits ==
Animals kept at Borth Animalarium include wolfdogs, pigs, goats, reptiles, birds, silver foxes, rabbits and tortoises.

In 2005, the zoo took on an African leopard named Rajah. The cat, bred at Basildon Zoo in Essex in 1995, had been sold to a private owner but was given up after it tried to kill its owner.

In September 2010, the Mumbrays were fined £1,237.50 plus costs at Aberystwyth Magistrates' Court for displaying animals without proper paperwork. In addition to the fine, nine of the zoo's animals were ordered to be confiscated including the zoo's leopard, two lynx and two ring tailed lemurs. The couple vowed to fight against the confiscation order, and several attempts to take the animals were unsuccessful due in part to paperwork irregularities and a lack of co-operation from the leopard.

In July 2012, a beaver escaped from the zoo. In August 2013, the zoo again made the news when a leopard nearly escaped from its enclosure when its cage door was accidentally left open.

In 2013, the zoo took in a three-month-old female Lynx named Nilly, who was partially hand-reared. A female companion was brought in for her in May 2016. The new animal turned out to be pregnant and gave birth to three kittens two days later, two of which survived and were named Tirion and Lilleth.

In August 2015 the Animalarium took delivery of two African Lion, named Zulu and Wilma, from Noah's Ark Zoo Farm in Somerset

In late October 2017 it was reported that an 18-month-old, adult lynx had escaped from her enclosure at some point in the previous week. It was reported that seven sheep had been killed in the days following her escape, approximately 500 metres from the zoo, although the zoo owners insisted the lynx was not responsible. After more than a week evading capture, the lynx was shot dead by a marksman under the instruction of Ceredigion County Council when it wandered into a populated area. The killing of the lynx was criticised both by the local community and by celebrities including wildlife broadcaster Chris Packham, who sent a bottle of Lynx deodorant to the council, saying that their decision "stinks". The council later stated that there had been no possibility to use a tranquilliser dart and that euthanizing the lynx was the only realistic option. It later emerged that the operators of the zoo had been warned twice in the months leading up to the escape that trees were too tall in the lynx enclosure and that there was a significant risk of escape.

The zoo owners protested about the killing of the lynx, saying they were "outraged" about the incident. It later emerged that another lynx had been accidentally killed several days earlier when it asphyxiated as it was being controlled with a catchpole while being moved to another enclosure.

The second death drew wide criticism, with calls for the zoo to be shut down. In the wake of the incident, people from the local community rallied around the owners, with nearly 150 turning up to help refurbish the zoo. Following the lynx escape, the zoo was banned from keeping "category one" dangerous animals, including large cats.

The ban on keeping category one animals was reversed in July 2018 following an inspection of the zoo by Ceredigion council officials, on the condition that a qualified and experienced keeper was employed. The ban was re-imposed in January 2020 due to the zoo having insufficient members of staff with firearms certificates.

In March 2020 it was reported that a fifth of the animals housed at the zoo had died within the space of a year. Two days later it was reported that two African antelopes had escaped.

== Insolvency ==
Following an insolvency hearing in London in February 2021, the company was compulsorily wound up and had its assets liquidated, due to unpaid debts of more than £100,000. The lions have been rehomed in Kent.
