= Randal Ford =

American photographer

- Born: Dallas, Texas
- Education: Texas A&M University
- Occupations: Photographer and portraitist
- Website: randalford.art www.randalford.com

Randal Ford is an American photographer and portraitist notable for his work The Animal Kingdom, as well as his photography for Texas Monthly. Based in Austin, his work has been featured in TIME Magazine, Texas Monthly, and Communication Arts. In contrast to other photographers and institutions that capture images of animals, Randal Ford's work seeks to photograph animals in studio to give the impression that "the animals are introducing themselves." Other works include The Amazing Faith of Texas, Good Dog, and Farm Life (2024).

== Early life ==
Randal Ford grew up in Dallas, where he attended Highland Park High School. He graduated from Texas A&M University, where he studied business and dabbled in photography through shooting for the student newspaper. While studying at the university, Ford was influenced by Richard Avedon's work, In the American West, "that captured the spirit of place through people Avedon encountered at slaughterhouses, ranches, and state fairs."

== Career ==
Randal Ford began his animal photography series with a photoshoot in a rural area of Texas, near the city of Waco, that highlighted farm life. His photographs of cows were featured in Dairy Today. Inspired by Richard Avedon, Randal Ford uses the aesthetic promulgated In the American West, making "Head-on portraits with a no-frills sensibility", except centered on animals, rather than on persons. Ford, in explaining his reasoning in photographing animals, stated:

Over 40,000 years ago, we began to depict animals in cave drawings. Throughout history, mankind’s consistent portrayal of animals in art is a testament to the importance of our connection with the animal kingdom. As mankind evolved, so did our artwork. We began to not only depict, but personify animals. We began to see our human emotions in animals. This anthropomorphism or personification connected us to animals on a deeper and more emotional level. This collection is my perspective and portrayal of the animal kingdom. As a portrait photographer, my intention is for these animal portraits to speak to you. What they say depends on the conscious and subconscious feelings you embody. By photographing each subject in studio on a neutral background, I am creating a portrait that is focused on the animal only. This deconstructive approach to portraiture allows you to experience the creature in a way otherwise not possible. Through this language of simplistic portraiture, these photographs are aimed to elicit an emotion in you. Whether it’s beauty, power, or humor, I want to give animals the opportunity to tell their story and to connect with you.

The Animal Kingdom took two years to complete, with Randal Ford spending time on both commercial and editorial photography. The animals featured in the work were sometimes obtained from Hollywood Animals and Cat Haven; the photoshoots themselves were done using a professional-grade Nikon D850. The one hundred and fifty animals that Ford captured for this project included a brown goat, mountain lion, bull, duck, chimpanzee, skunk, peacock, cheetah, great horned owl, two-toed sloth, African elephant and American buffalo, among others. The Animal Kingdom placed number one in the International Photo Awards competition in 2017. The Animal Kingdom: A Collection of Portraits is published by Rizzoli and Funds collected from purchases of The Animal Kingdom are dispatched to Project Survival’s Cat Haven, a park engaged in the preservation of wild cats.

Randal Ford has photographically recreated covers for L.L.Bean, including antique covers, as well as vintage illustrations, for modern use.

The cover story of the August 2013 issue of TIME Magazine discussed "the growing trend of childless couples in America" and its illustrations were photographed by Randal Ford, who stated that his "goal for the cover was to show two people as a family unit". He similarly recreated the 1961 cover for Field & Stream. Ford has shot more than twenty covers for the Texas Monthly magazine.

Randal Ford's portraits formed the basis for the book The Amazing Faith of Texas, a survey of the various faiths followed by the residents of the American state of Texas. The book was published by the University of Texas Press.

In 2020, Randal Ford authored Good Dog, which included 150 portraits of canines. These animals were photographed over a period of six weeks in Austin, Dallas, and Los Angeles. The publication of Farm Life in 2024 was done through moving farm animals into a mobile studio, which traveled across the United States.

== Books ==
- The Amazing Faith of Texas (2006)
- The Animal Kingdom (2018)
- Good Dog (2020)
- Farm Life: A Collection of Animal Portraits (2024)

== Charity ==
Through the publication of his books, Ford has contributed to philanthropic endeavors. Portions from the proceeds of Good Dog were contributed to Emancipet, a nonprofit aimed at making veterinary care accessible to pet owners. When Farm Life was published in 2024, funds from the purchases were donated to the Dell Children’s Foundation in Austin, Texas.
