= Cors Fochno =

Raised peat bog in Ceredigion, Wales

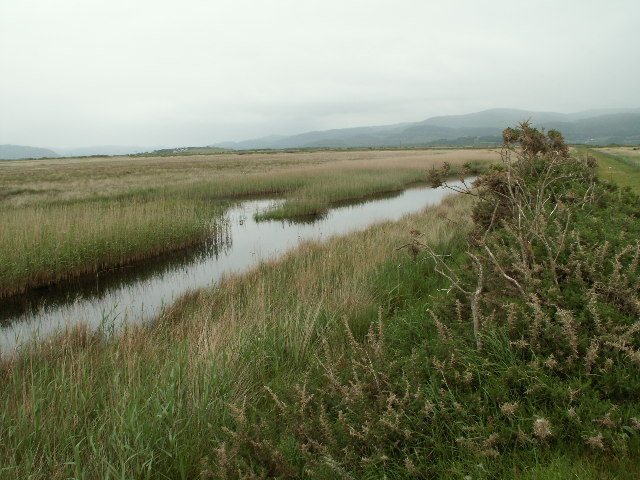
- Cors Fochno, Aberleri Nature Reserve
- Interactive map of Cors Fochno
- Location: Ceredigion, Wales
- Coordinates: 52.503°N 4.015°W
- Governing body: Countryside Council for Wales

Cors Fochno (Welsh pronunciation: [kɔrs ˈvɔχnɔ]) is a raised peat bog near the village of Borth, in the county of Ceredigion, Wales. Lying on the south side of the Dyfi estuary, it forms a component part of the Dyfi National Nature Reserve. It was designated a UNESCO biosphere reserve in 1976, and is the only such reserve in Wales. A boardwalk leading from the northern edge of the bog skirts the edges of the bog and surrounding woodland.

A significant portion of the 264 hectares (652 acres) former peatland complex was taken for agriculture; the surviving core area supports the largest expanse of primary near-natural raised bog in an estuarine context within the United Kingdom.

A large peatland area south of Lago General Vintter in Chubut, Argentina, bears the name Cors Fochno, adopted in reference to the original peat bog in Ceredigion.

== General site character ==
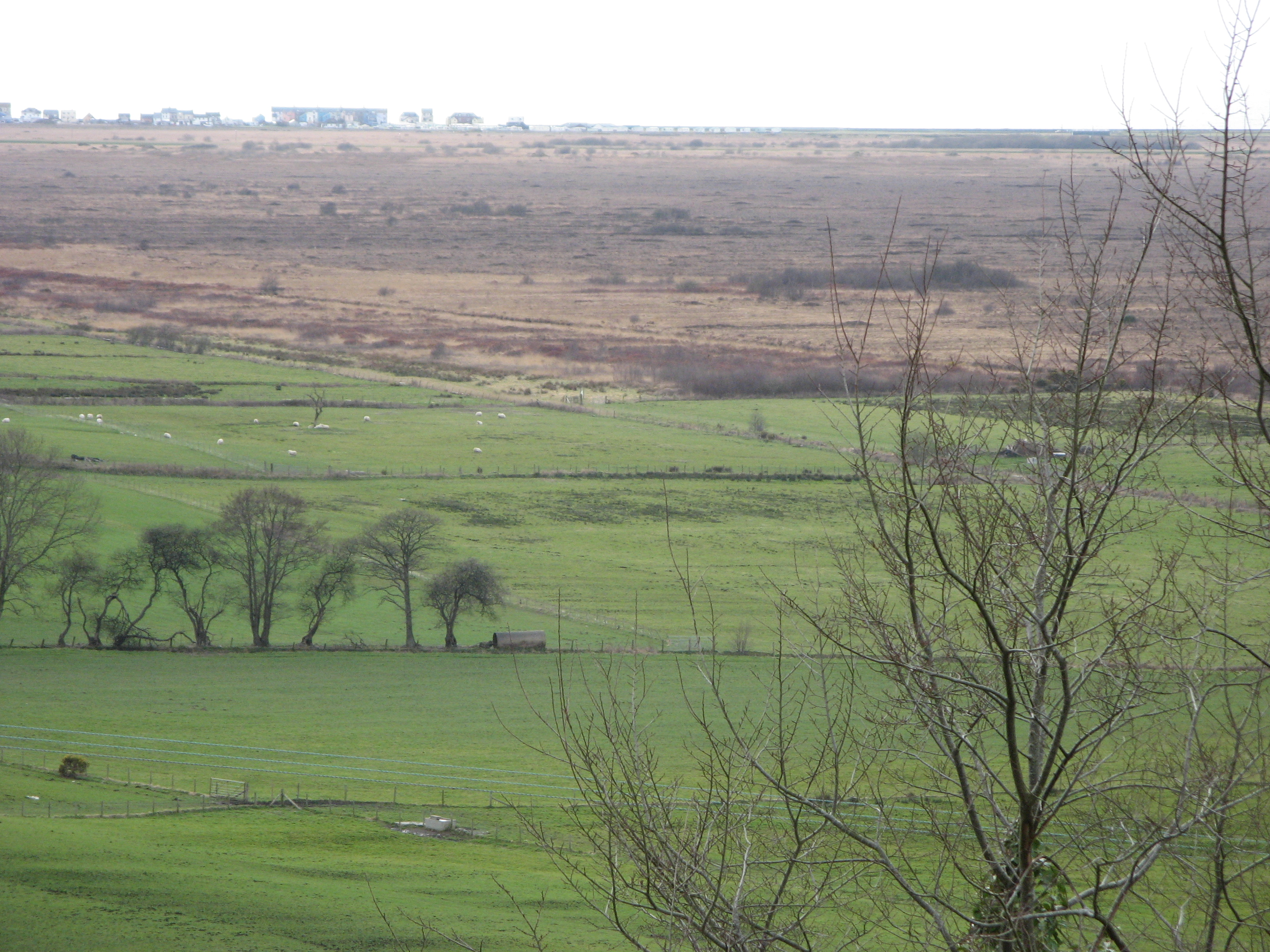
Cors Fochno with Borth in the background

- Bogs. Marshes. Water fringed vegetation. Fens (85%)
- Heath. Scrub. Maquis and garrigue. (9%)
- Humid grassland. Mesophile grassland (5%)
- Improved grassland (1%)

== Ecology ==
Part of the Dyfi National Nature Reserve, Cors Fochno contains several varieties of peat moss and carnivorous plant.

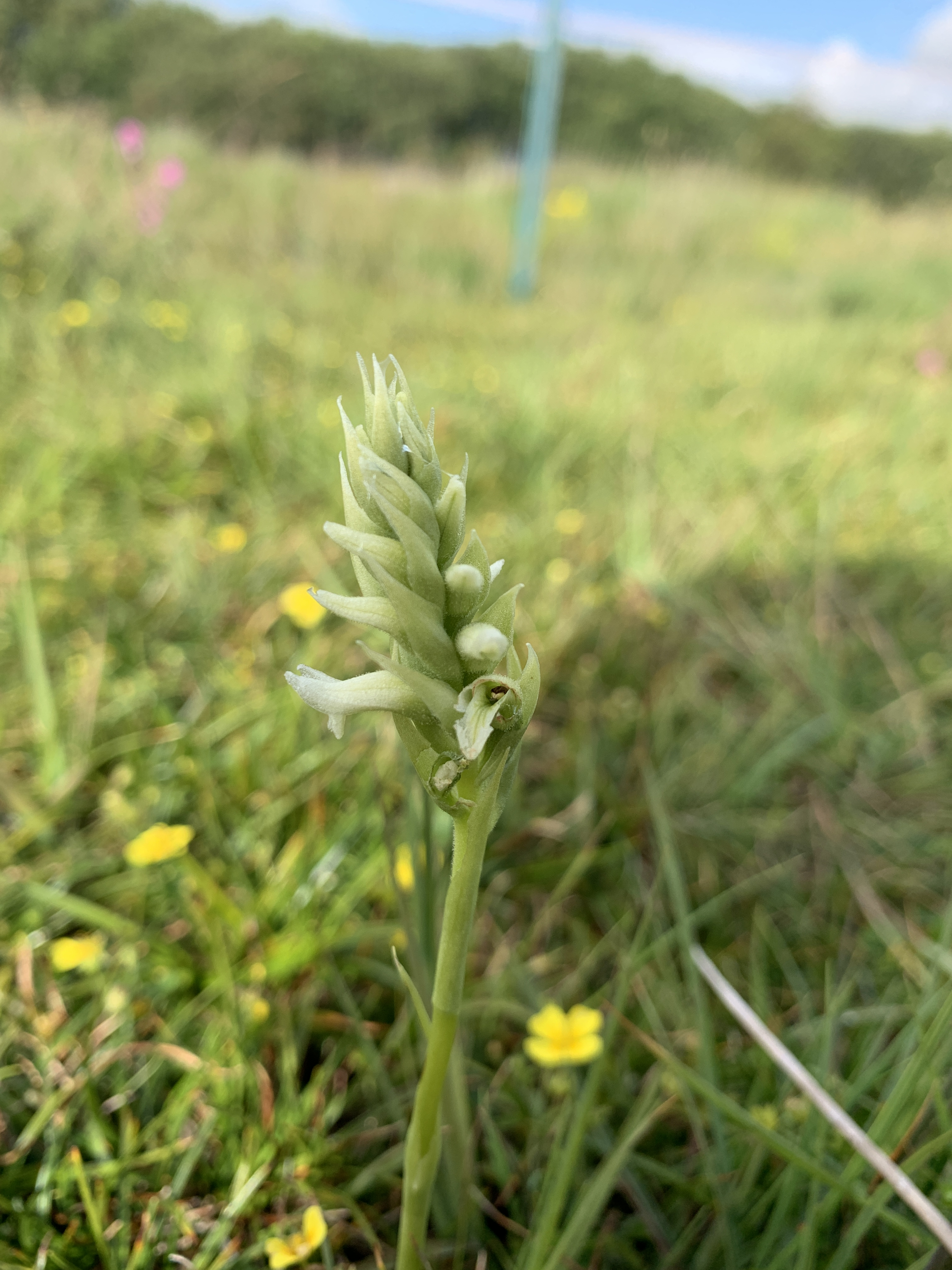

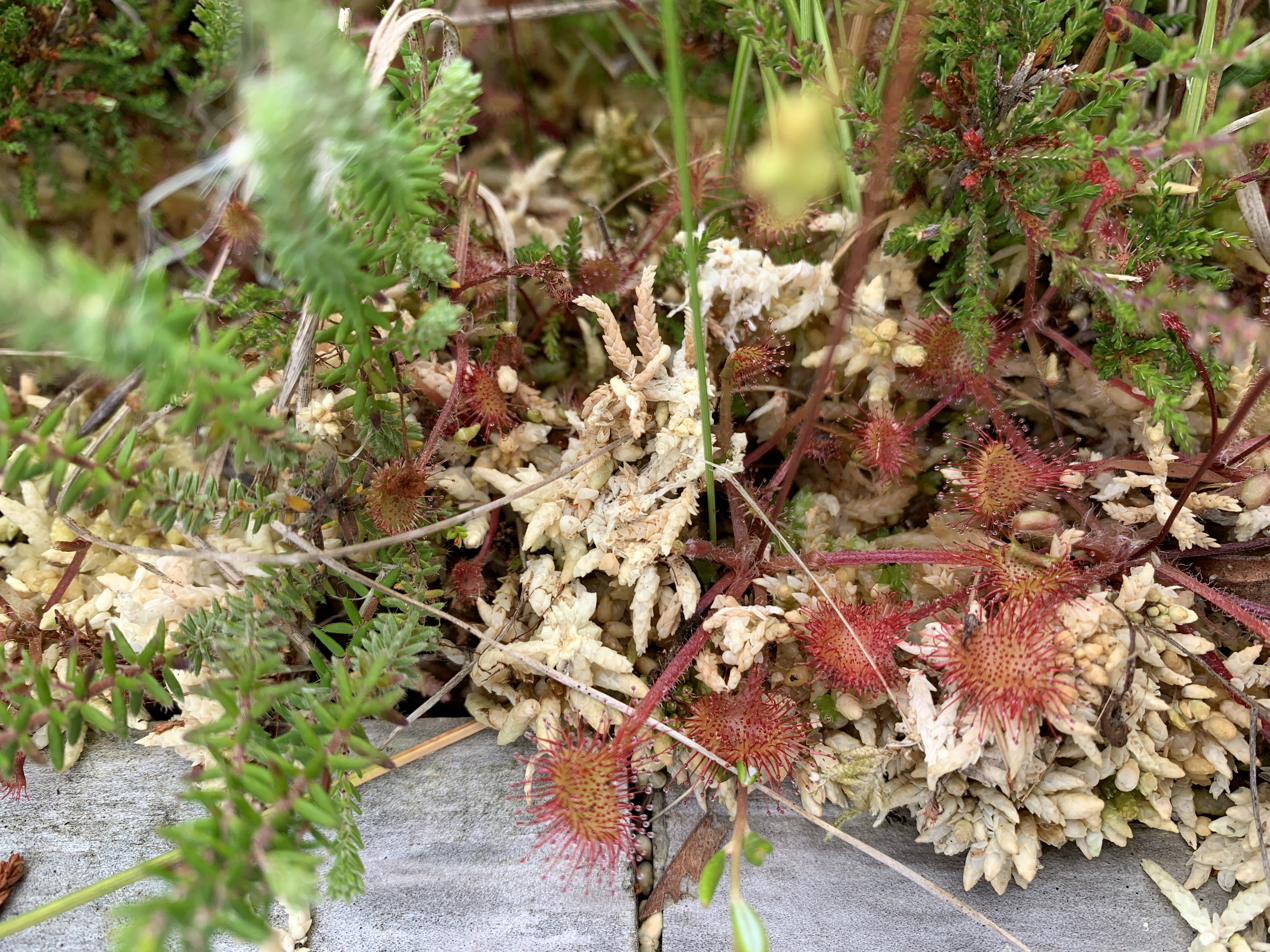

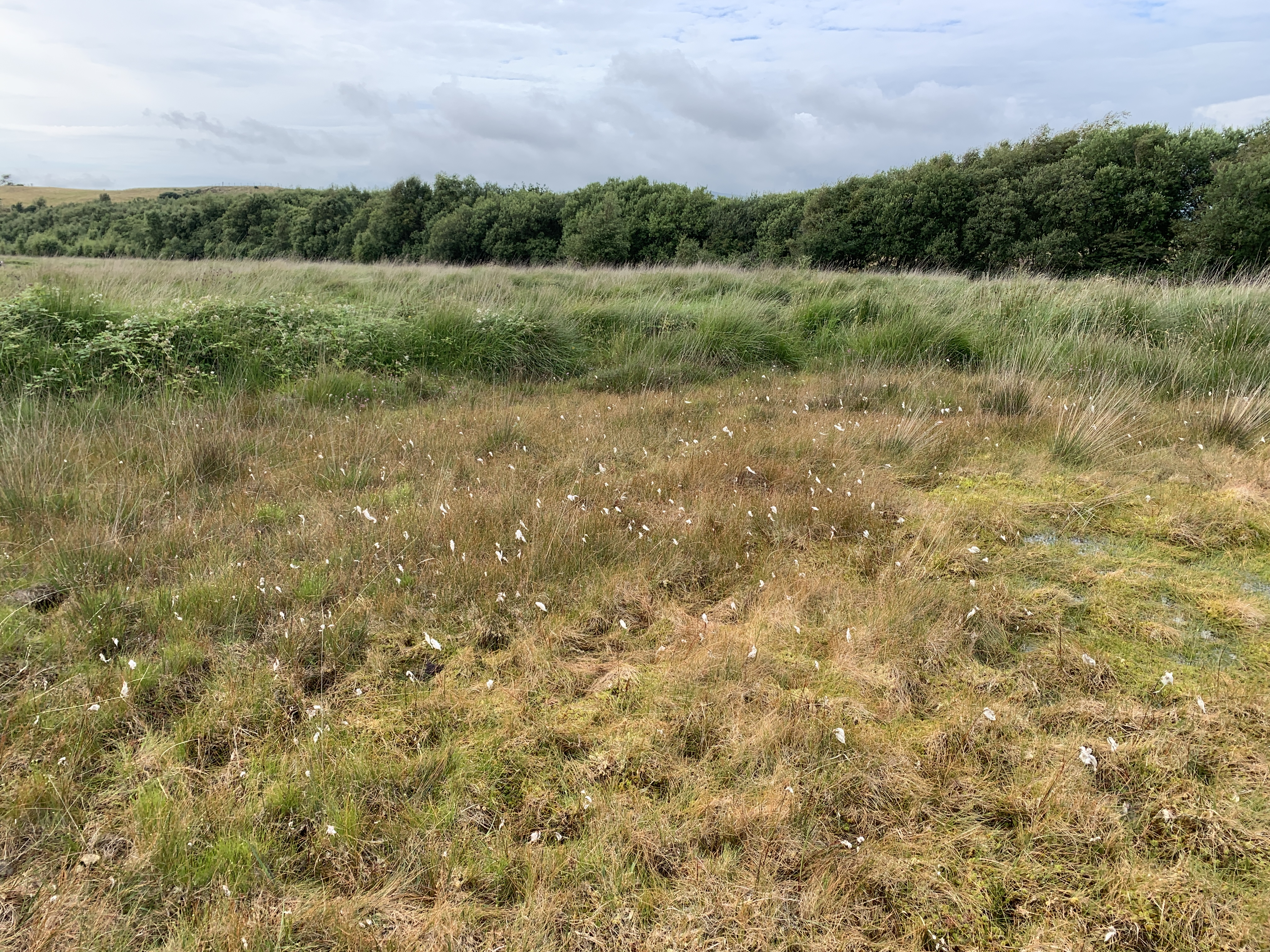

== Wildlife ==
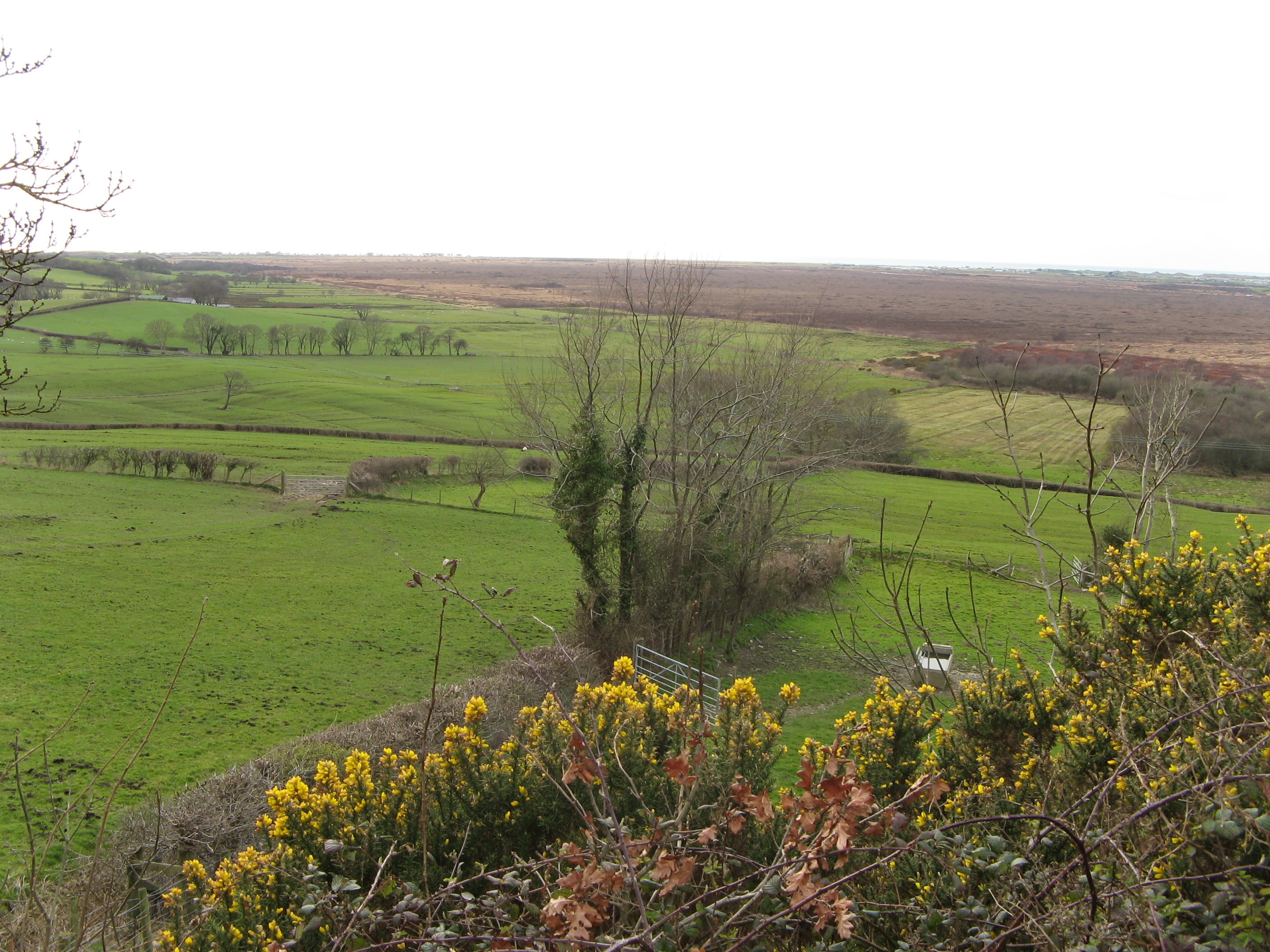
Cors Fochno

Otters, red kites, common buzzards, peregrines and, in the winter, hen harriers can be found here together with a number of Welsh Mountain Ponies, and adder, badger, blackcap, Dartford warbler, fallow deer, nightingale, nightjar, willow warbler, and woodcock. The site holds a population of rosy marsh moth, a very rare species in the UK. The site holds significant populations of Eriophorum angustifolium, the common cottongrass, as well as Round-leaved sundew, all visible from the boardwalk which skirts the northern edge of the bog. In 2019, an extremely rare species of orchid for Great Britain, the Irish Lady's-tresses, was found on the bog. The population has persisted into 2024

== In popular culture ==
- Borth, Borth bog, and the Borth railway station form the backdrop to the main storyline in Season 1, Episode 4 ("The Girl in the Water") of Y Gwyll (Hinterland in English), transmitted on S4C in 2013 and BBC1 Wales in January 2014.
- Cors Fochno, and Borth and its surroundings also form the backdrop to the young adult classic novel and Newbery Honor Book winner, A String in the Harp, 1976, by Nancy Bond.
