= Ynyslas Sand Dunes =

Sand dunes in Ceredigion, Wales

Coordinates: 52°31′30″N 4°03′25″W

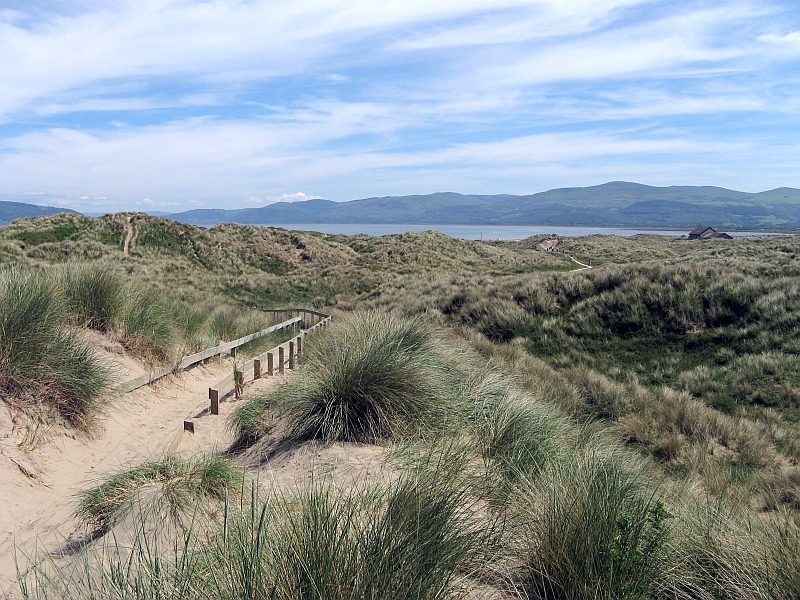
Ynyslas Sand Dunes, July 2008

Ynyslas Sand Dunes (Welsh: Twyni Tywod Ynyslas) are sand dunes located in Ceredigion, Wales. They border Cardigan Bay and the Dyfi Estuary between Ynyslas, Ceredigion and Aberdyfi, Gwynedd. The sand dunes are part of the Dyfi National Nature Reserve.

== Wildlife ==
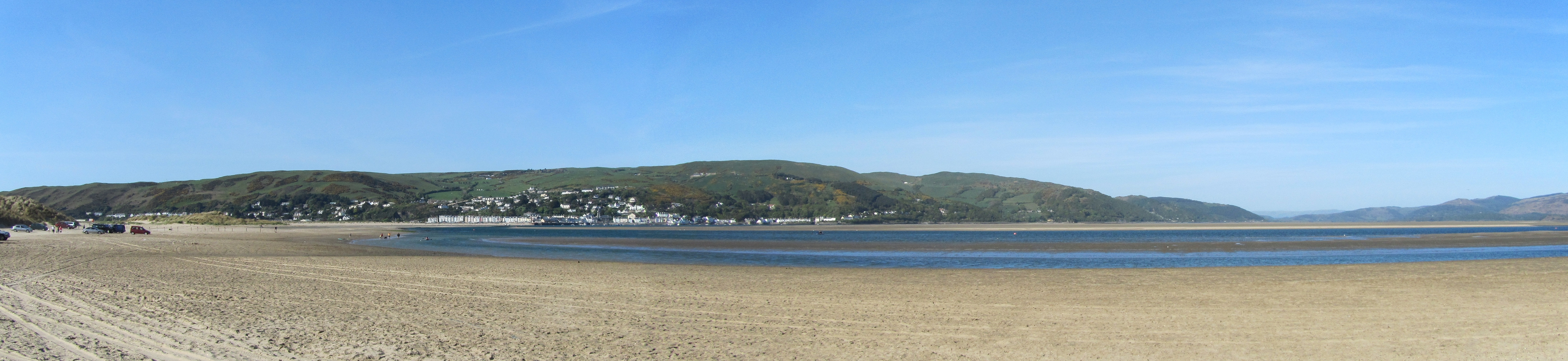
Aberdyfi from Ynyslas Sand Dunes, April 2011

Viviparous lizards, stoats, polecats, rabbits and voles can be found in the dunes. Skylarks, meadow pipits and ringed plovers can be seen and heard over the dunes. Butterflies and moths which can be found here include the dark green fritillary and gatekeeper butterflies and the scarlet tiger and Portland moths.

The sand lizard was introduced to Ynyslas NNR as part of a nationwide programme to boost population numbers, which started in 1995.

== Tourism ==
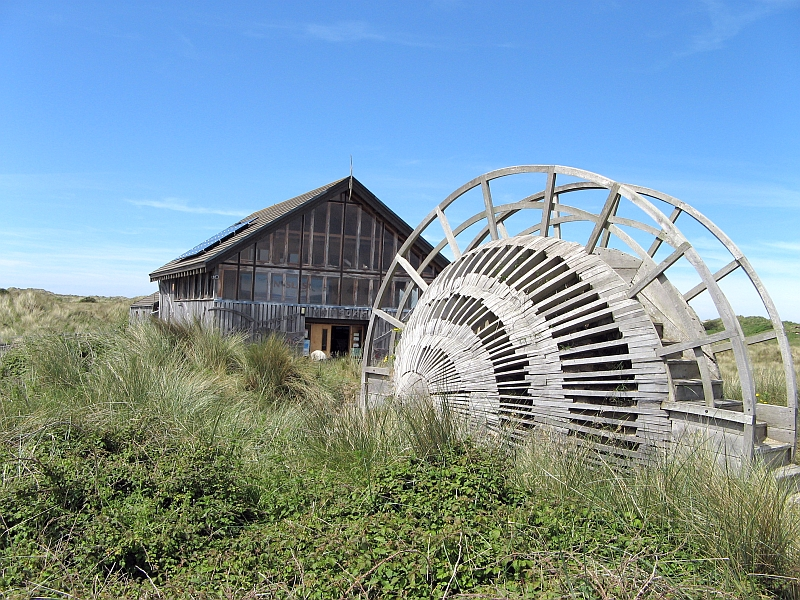
The visitor centre, July 2008

There are waymarked boardwalk trails through the dunes where marsh and bee orchids flower during the early summer.

The visitor centre (open Easter to September) contains further information about the plants and wildlife of the area.

Around a quarter of a million people visit Ynyslas Sand Dunes each year. Kitesurfing is popular on the adjacent beaches, and the BBC Kite-flying ident was filmed on the beach in 2006.
