= Borth =

Seaside village in Ceredigion, Wales

Borth: Welsh: Y Borth
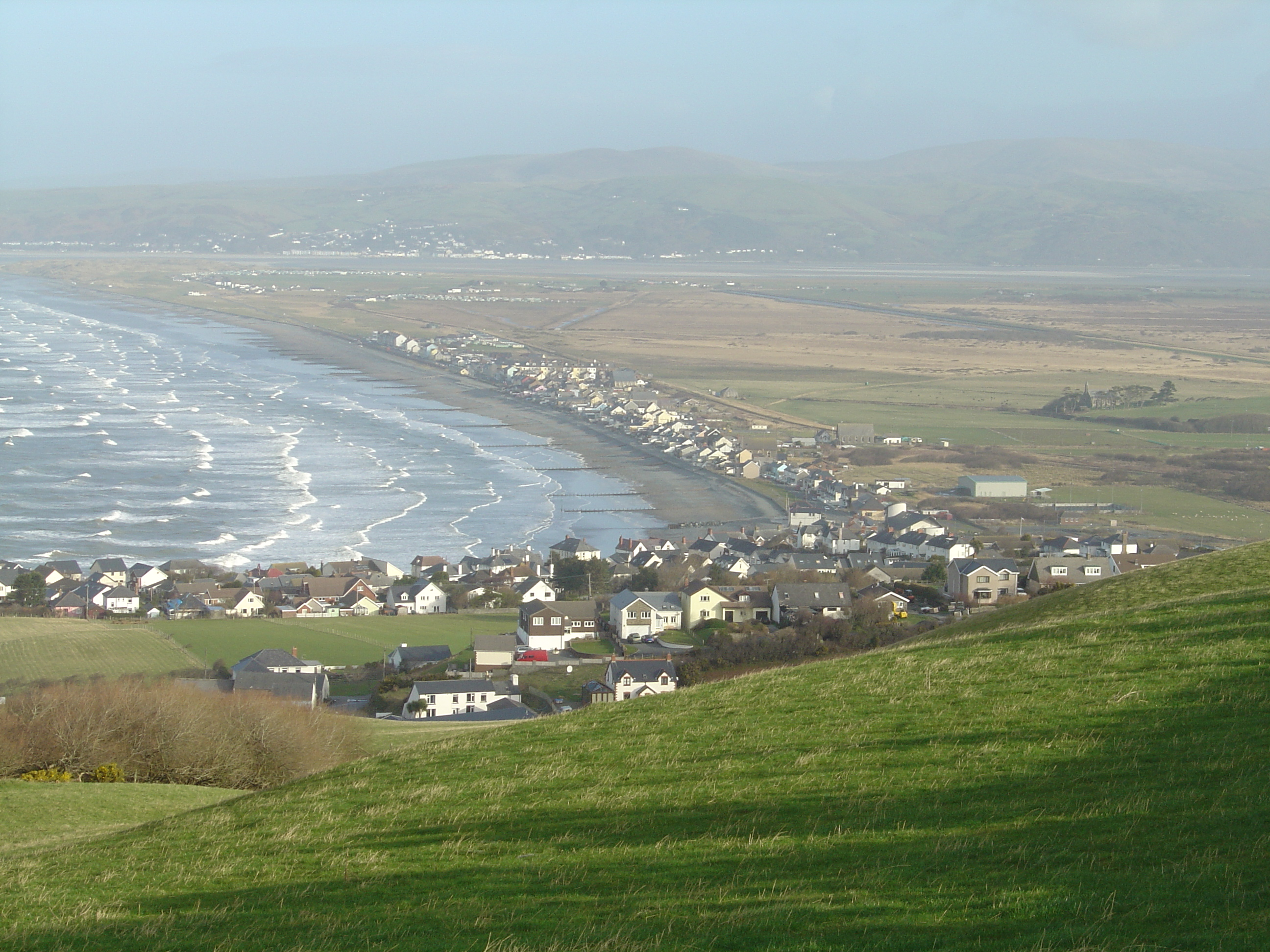
- Borth, with Cors Fochno, the River Dyfi estuary and Aberdyfi in the background

- Location within Ceredigion
- Population: 1,399 (2011)
- OS grid reference: SN608894
- Principal area: Ceredigion
- Preserved county: Dyfed
- Country: Wales
- Sovereign state: United Kingdom
- Post town: Borth
- Postcode district: SY24
- Police: Dyfed-Powys
- Fire: Mid and West Wales
- Ambulance: Welsh
- UK Parliament: Ceredigion Preseli
- List of places UK Wales Ceredigion 52.48533°N 4.05103°W Community map: Map of the community

Borth (Welsh: Y Borth) is a village, seaside resort and community in Ceredigion, Mid Wales; it is located 7 miles (11 km) north of Aberystwyth, on the Ceredigion Coast Path. The community includes the settlement of Ynyslas and the population was 1,399 in 2011. Borth's sandy beach has helped to promote it as a seaside resort.

From being largely Welsh-speaking, the village has become anglicised; over 54 per cent of its residents were born in England. According to both the 1991 and 2001 censuses, 43 per cent of the residents of Borth were primarily Welsh-speakers.

== History ==
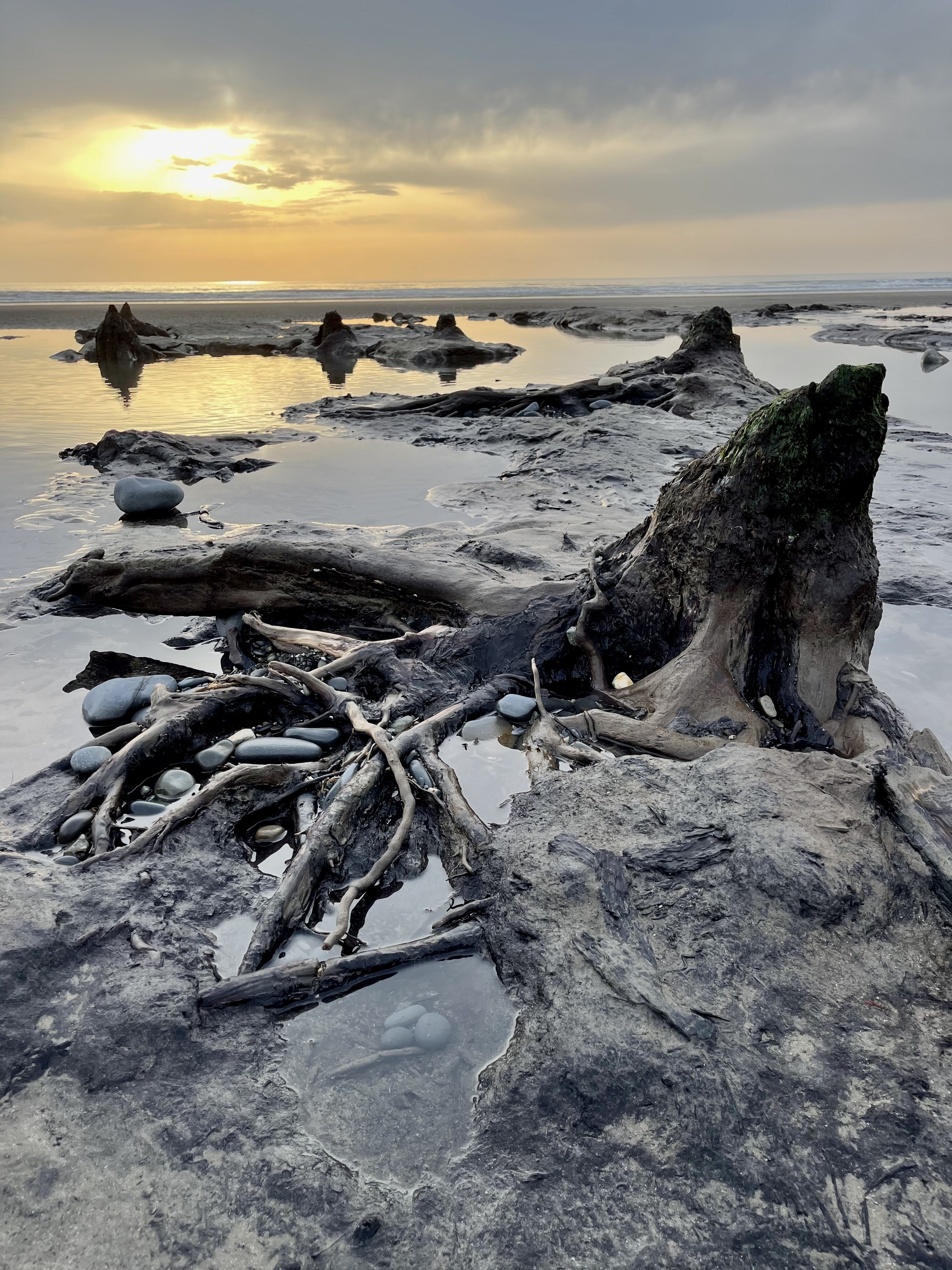
Petrified tree stump at Borth; 2021

There is an ancient submerged forest visible at low tide along the beach, where stumps of oak, pine, birch, willow and hazel (preserved by the acid anaerobic conditions in the peat) can be seen. Radiocarbon dating suggests the trees date from about 1500 BCE. This submerged forest also ties in with the legend of Cantre'r Gwaelod. The stumps were exposed for a time by Storm Hannah in 2019.

Cors Fochno, a raised peat mire, part of the Dyfi Biosphere, is the only UNESCO Biosphere reserve in Wales. It is located next to the village, together with the Dyfi National Nature Reserve and visitors' centre at Ynyslas. The village is crossed by a long-distance footpath, the Dyfi Valley Way.

In the past Upper Borth, then known simply as Borth, was in the township of Cyfoeth y Brenin, and nearby Morfa Borth being part of the township of Henllys. It is Morfa Borth which is now known as Borth today.

On 4 April 1876, the entire Uppingham School in Rutland, England, consisting of 300 boys, 30 masters and their families, moved to Borth for a period of 14 months, taking over the disused Cambrian Hotel and a large number of boarding houses, to avoid a typhoid epidemic.

The village war memorial, above a cliff south of the beach, was struck by lightning on 21 March 1983 and had to be rebuilt.

In 2008 and 2009, Borth hosted The Square Festival.

In 2011, work commenced on the first phase of a £12-million coastal protection scheme along the Borth to Ynyslas coastline, which was finished in 2015. The work was funded by the Welsh Assembly and the EU. An unexpected consequence of the coastal defence work was to reveal the remains of the petrified forest.

In 2018, Borth was subjected to media attention after the escape of a wild lynx from its local zoo.

In 2019, the village hosted a community street production called Borth Begins.

== Governance ==
An electoral ward named Borth stretches south-east to Geneu'r Glyn. Its total population at the 2011 Census was 2,078. Borth is also the name of a ward in the current Ceredigion County Council, covering the communities of Borth and Llandre.

=== Local government history ===
Borth had a representative on Cardiganshire County Council from its formation in 1889. The first councillor elected was Rev. Enoch Watkin James, Brynderwen, a Liberal candidate and Calvinistic Methodist minister. After his election in January 1889, according to a local newspaper, "flags were generally displayed and after nightfall bonfires lighted, fireworks discharged, houses illuminated and hundreds of people paraded the streets up to a late hour. About six o'clock, the rev. gentlemen and friends were drawn in an open carriage through the village and, addressing the assembly, said that the day was rapidly approaching when laws would be made by the people for the people."

Borth was represented on Ceredigion District Council by Tom Raw-Rees, from the 1970s until his death in 2001. He latterly sat also for Borth on Ceredigion County Council. Before 1996, the Borth ward for elections to Dyfed County Council covered Borth, Ceulanamaesmawr and Tirymynach.

== Amenities ==
Borth is the location of the Borth Animalarium and the Borth and Ynyslas Golf Club, which was used for many of the scenes in TV series Hinterland.

The Borth inshore lifeboat (ILB) station was established in 1966 at the southern end of the beach.

There is a youth hostel in the village, with caravan and camping sites nearby.

The village football team, Borth United, resumed playing in the Cambrian Tyres 1st Division in the 2021–22 season.

== Transport ==
Borth railway station is a stop on the Cambrian Line. It is generally served by hourly trains each way between Aberystwyth to the west and alternating between Birmingham International and Shrewsbury in the east. Services are operated by Transport for Wales.

The station building houses Borth Station Museum, which displays community and railway historical artifacts and temporary exhibitions. The museum is run by volunteers.

== In popular culture ==
- The 1976 award-winning children's fantasy novel, A String in the Harp by the American author Nancy Bond, is set in Borth and the surrounding countryside.
- Borth, Cors Fochno and the railway station form the backdrop to the main storyline of "The Girl in the Water", in series 1 episode 4 of Y Gwyll (Hinterland in English), transmitted on S4C in 2013 and BBC1 Wales in January 2014.

== Notable residents ==
- Lindsay Ashford (born 1959 in Wolverhampton), crime novelist and journalist, currently lives in Borth.
- Frank Bickerton (1889–1954), Antarctic explorer and aviator, died in Borth.
- Michael Oliver (1925–2015), cardiology professor, was born in Borth.
- Mark Williams (born 1966 in Hertfordshire) was the Member of Parliament (MP) for the Ceredigion constituency in 2005–2017.

== Gallery ==
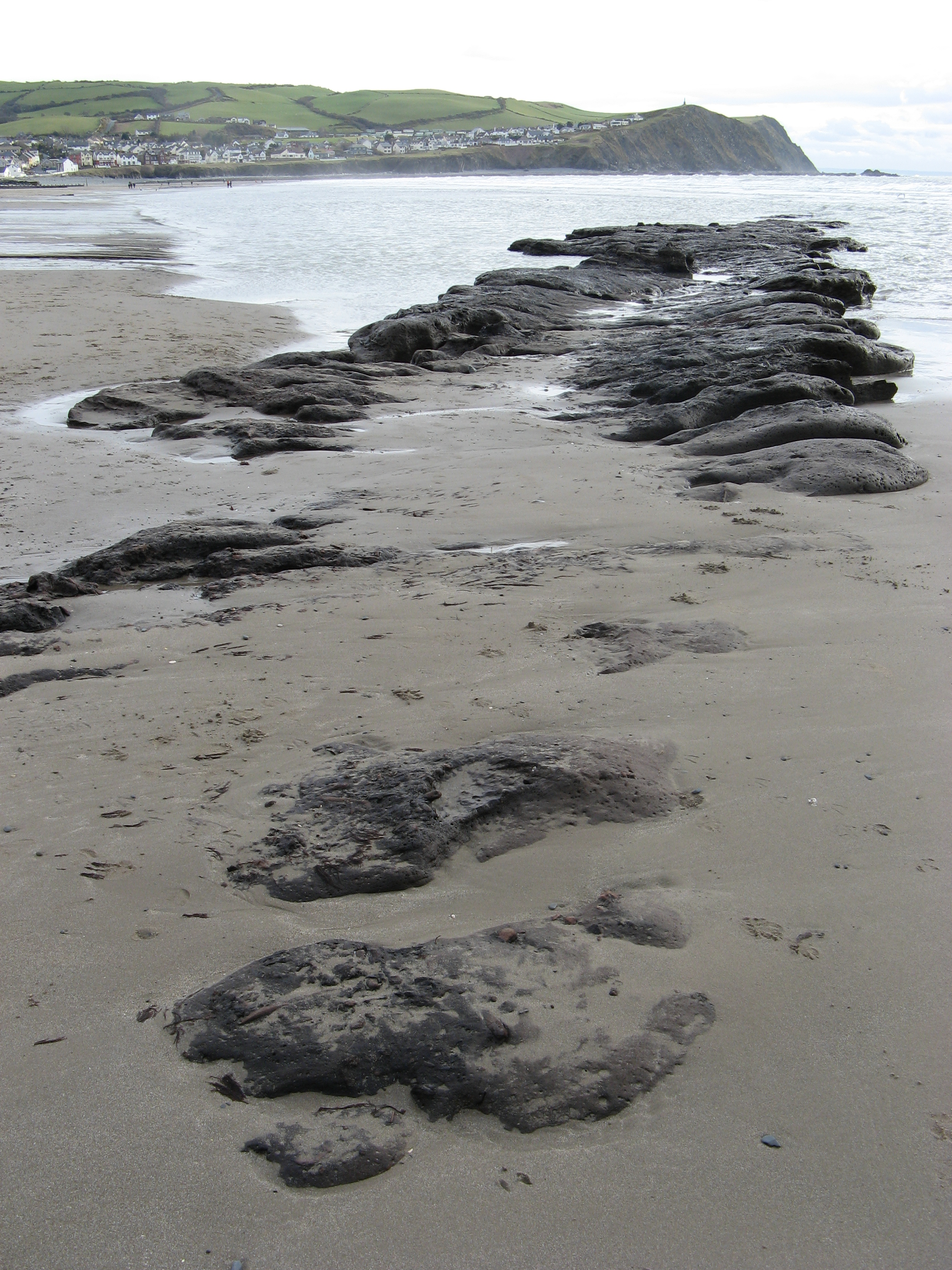
Submerged forest remains

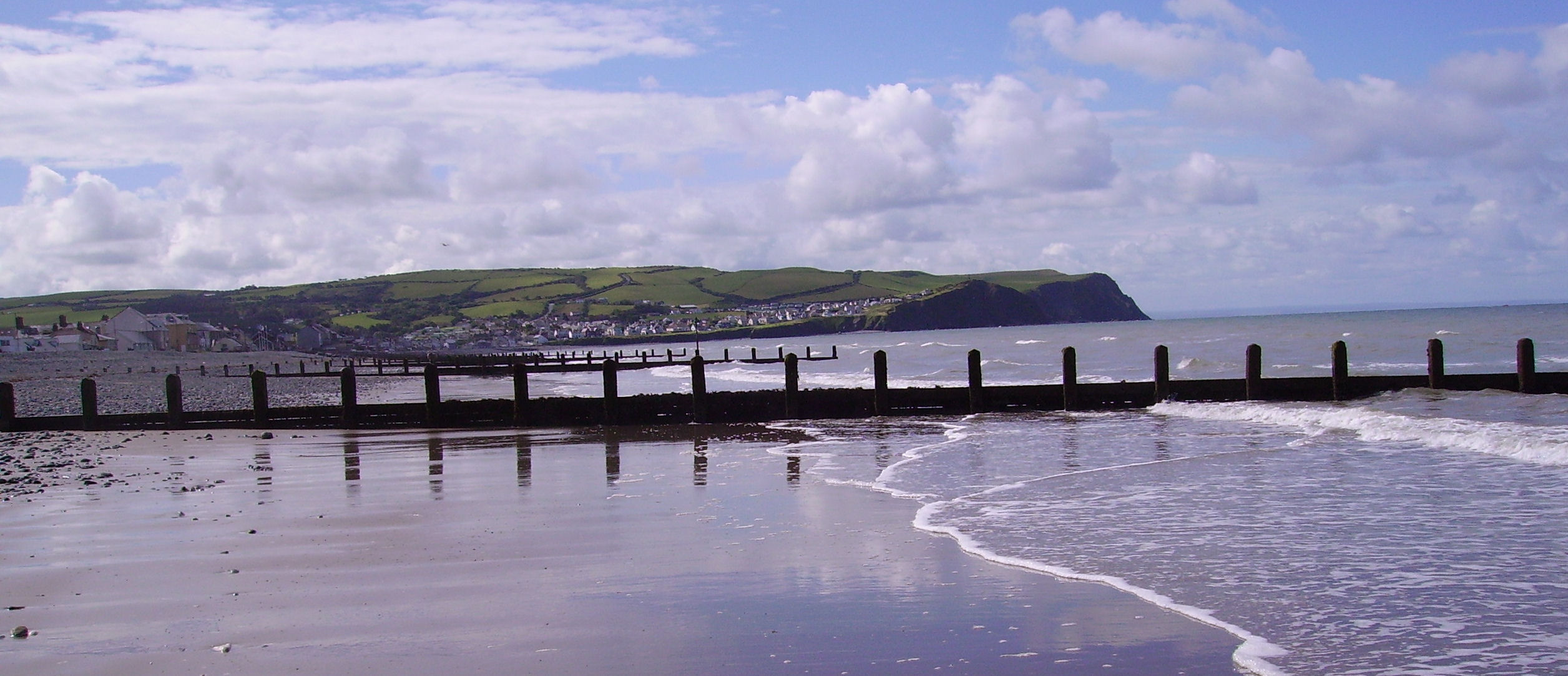
Borth Beach in the summer, looking south

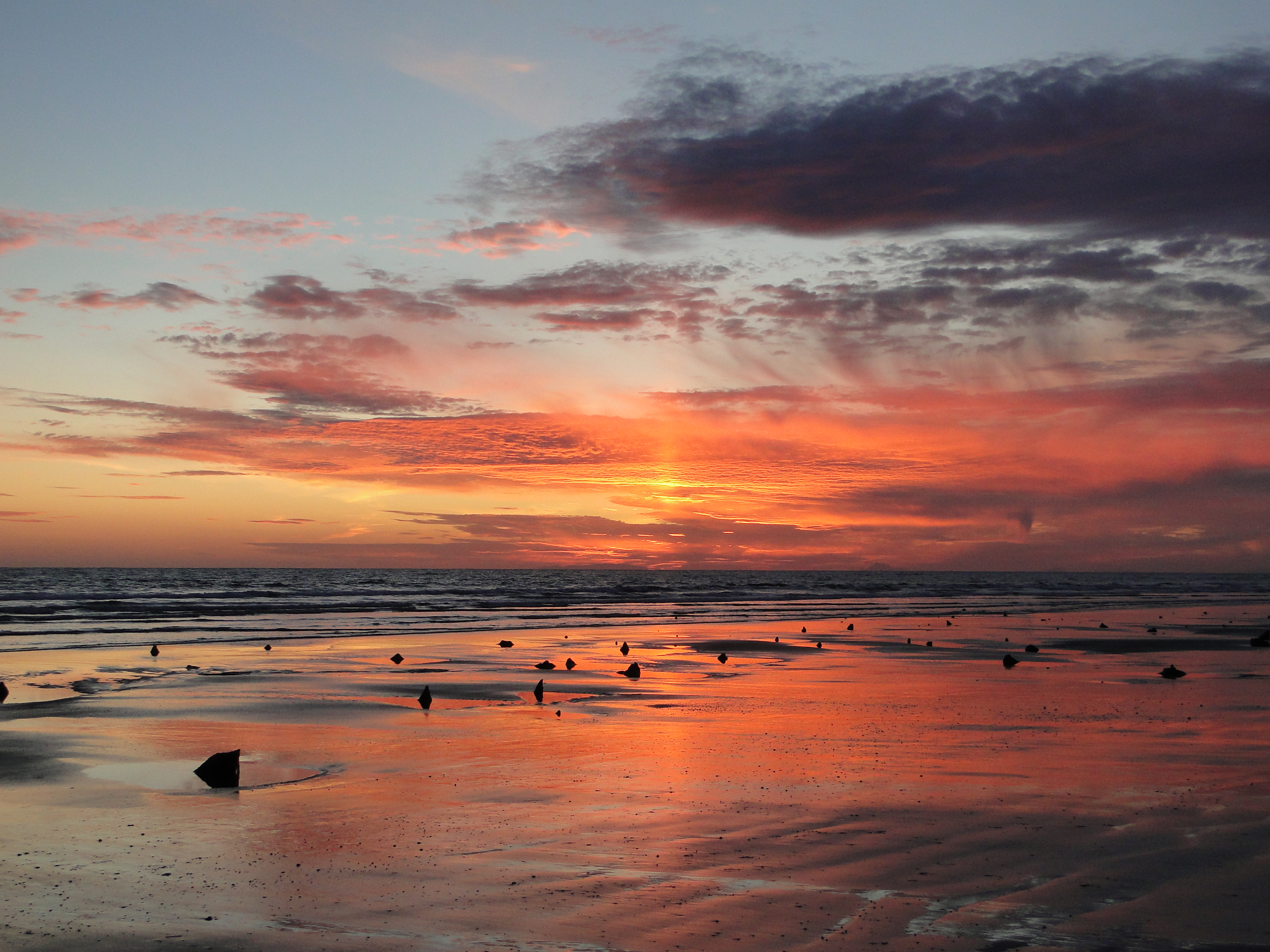
Sunset on Borth sands near Ynyslas, looking north
