= Robert Morgan (bishop) =

Welsh Bishop of Bangor

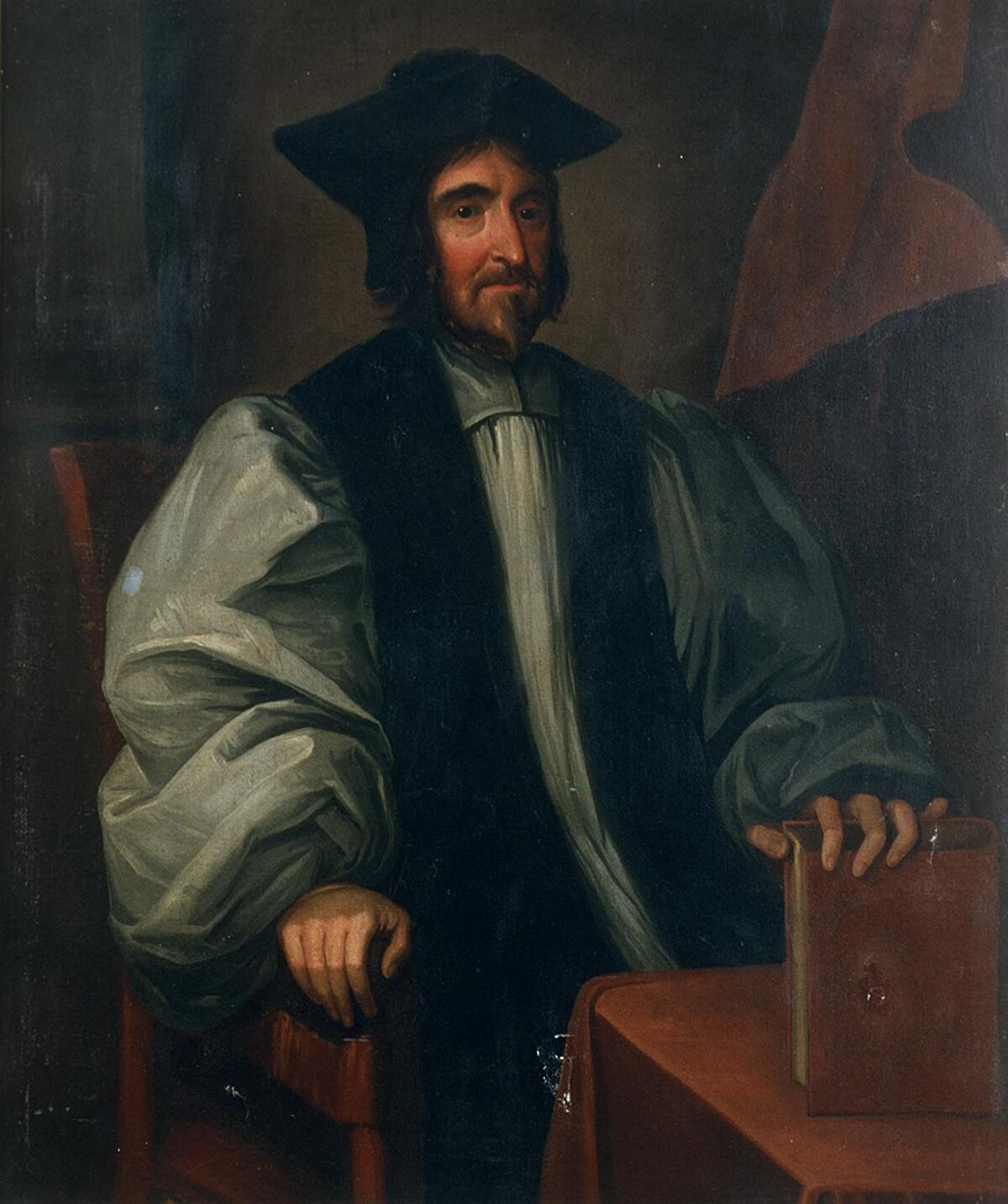
Bishop Morgan

Robert Morgan (1608 – 1 September 1673) was a Welsh Bishop of Bangor.

== Life ==
He was born at Fronfraith in the parish of Llandyssil in Montgomeryshire, the third son of Richard Morgan, gent., M.P. for Montgomery Boroughs (UK Parliament constituency) in 1592-3, and of his wife, Margaret, daughter of Thomas Lloyd of Gwernbuarth. He was educated near Bronfraith, under the father of Simon Lloyd, archdeacon of Merioneth, and proceeded to Jesus College, Cambridge, where he entered 6 July 1624, and graduated B.A. in 1628, M.A. in 1631.

He was appointed chaplain to David Dolben on his election to the bishopric of Bangor, and was nominated to the vicarage of Llanwnol in Montgomeryshire, 16 September 1632, and afterwards to the rectory of Llangynhafal and Dyffryn Clwyd. On Dolben's death in 1633 he returned to Cambridge, where on 25 June 1634 he was transferred to St. John's College. With the appointment of William Roberts to the bishopric of Bangor in 1637, he returned to Wales as his chaplain, and received from him the vicarage of Llanfair in the deanery of Dyffryn Clwyd, 1637, and the rectory of Efenechtyd in 1638. He proceeded B.D. that year. On 1 July 1642 he was collated prebendary of Chester on the resignation of David Lloyd, but he does not appear to have retained it in the civil war.

Having resigned Llangynhafal, he was instituted to Trefdraeth in Anglesey on 16 July 1642. In the same year he resigned Llanfair, and was inducted to Llandyvnan (19 November 1642), also in Anglesey. At his own expense he bought from the Bulkeleys of Baron Hill, Anglesey the unexpired term of a ninety-nine years' lease of the tithes of Llandyvnan; his title to the living was not questioned during the wars, although he was ejected from his other preferments. By leaving this lease to the church he raised its annual value from £38 to £200. During the Commonwealth he resided chiefly at Henblas in the parish of Llangristiolus in Anglesey. In 1657, on the death of Robert White, he was nominated to the prebend of Penmynyd (Bangor diocese), but was not installed till after the Restoration, and relinquished it before April 1661.

At the Restoration he recovered his living of Trefdraeth, received the degree of D.D. (1661), became archdeacon of Merioneth, 24 July 1660, and in the same month 'comportioner' of Llandinam. On the death of Dr. Robert Price he was elected bishop of Bangor (8 June 1666), and consecrated 1 July at Lambeth. He held the archdeaconry of Merioneth in commendam from July 1660 to 1666, when (23 Oct.) he was succeeded by John Lloyd. The definite union of the archdeaconry with the bishopric was accomplished by Morgan's successor. He was long engaged in litigation with Thomas Jones, who held the living of Llandyrnog, which had usually been held by the bishops of Bangor in commendam because of its convenience for residence. Jones brought a charge against the bishop and two others early in 1669 in the court of arches.

Morgan died 1 September 1673, and was buried on 6 September in the grave of Bishop Nicholas Robinson, on the south side of the altar. (for two different inscriptions see Lansdowne MS. 986, fol. 168). He had made restorations in Bangor Cathedral, and gave an organ; he was a preacher in English and Welsh.

== Family ==
Morgan married Anne, daughter and heiress of William Lloyd, rector of Llaneilian, Anglesey, and left four sons: (1) Richard, died young; (2) Owen, of Jesus College and Gray's Inn (1676), and attendant on Sir Leoline Jenkins at the treaty of Nimeguen, died 11 April 1679; (3) William (born 1664), LL.B. of Jesus College, Oxford (1685), later chancellor of the diocese of Bangor; (4) Robert D.D. (born 1665), of Christ Church, Oxford, canon of Hereford 1702, and rector of Ross, Herefordshire. Of four daughters: (1) Margaret was wife of Edward Wynne; (2) Anna, wife of Thomas Lloyd of Kefn, registrar of St. Asaph; (3) Elizabetha, married Humphrey Humphreys, dean of Bangor; and (4) Katherine, who died unmarried, was buried with her father.

Church of England titles
Preceded by Robert Price	Bishop of Bangor; 1666–1673	Succeeded by Humphrey Lloyd
