= Hugh Bellot =

British bishop (1542 – 1596)

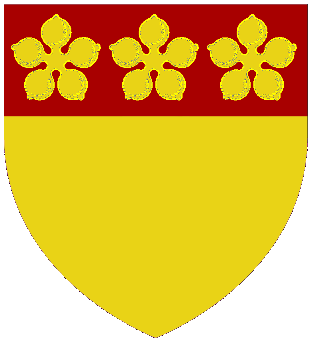
Arms: Or on a chief Gules three cinquefoils of the first.

Hugh Bellot (1542 – 1596) was an English prelate during the Tudor period, who served as bishop of Bangor and then bishop of Chester.

Dr Bellot assisted William Morgan in his Welsh-language translation of the Bible.

== Life ==
Bellot graduated B.A. from Christ's College, Cambridge, in 1564, proceeding M.A. before election as a fellow of Jesus College, Cambridge in 1567, later receiving the degree of D.D.

The third of ten sons of Thomas Bellot, lord of the manor of Moreton Magna, Cheshire by his wife Alice Roydon, a Welsh-speaker from Denbighshire, reputedly he was a misogynist.

A younger brother, Cuthbert Bellot, became Archdeacon of Chester, whilst he also helped secure an advantageous marriage for his nephew, Edward Bellot with Amy Grosvenor, whose grandson was created a baronet.

Bellot was consecrated as bishop of Bangor in 1585, and was translated in 1595 to the see of Chester. He died at Whitsuntide the following year at the Bishop's Palace, Chester being buried at Bersham, Denbighshire (now Clwyd).

== See also ==
- Bellot baronets
- Welsh Bible

== Notes ==
Church of England titles
Preceded by Nicholas Robinson	Bishop of Bangor; 1585–95	Succeeded by Richard Vaughan
Preceded by William Chaderton	Bishop of Chester; 1595–96	Succeeded by Richard Vaughan
