= Thomas Williams (dean of Bangor) =

Anglican priest (born 1870)

Thomas Alfred Williams was an Anglican priest.

Born on 16 June 1870 and educated at St David's College, Lampeter, he was ordained in 1895. After curacies in Anglesey and Portmadoc he held incumbencies at Dolgellau and Maentwrog before becoming the Archdeacon of Merioneth in 1931. Nine years later he was appointed Dean of Bangor but died in post after only one year in post on 27 July 1941.

Church in Wales titles
Preceded by Henry Lewis James	Dean of Bangor; 1940–1941	Succeeded by John Thomas Davies
