= John Richards (bishop of St Davids) =

British Anglican bishop (1901–1990)

John Richards Richards (3 March 1901 – 10 March 1990) was an Anglican bishop and author during the third quarter of the 20th century.

Educated at Ardwyn School, Aberystwyth and the University College of Wales, he was ordained after a period of study at St. Michael's College, Llandaff in 1925. He was a Curate at Pembrey and then a CMS missionary in Iran until 1945. He then held incumbencies at Skewen and then Pontypridd until 1955 when he became Dean of Bangor. In 1956 he became Bishop of St David's, a post he held until 1971. A Sub-Prelate of the Order of St John of Jerusalem, he had become a Doctor of Divinity (DD). Richards physical stature sometimes led to the famous criticism of Cosmo Gordon Lang, Archbishop of Canterbury, at the time of William Orpen's portrait being levelled at him. He had no fear of controversy: at the funeral of the wife of Sir David James, the businessman and founder of the Pantyfedwen Trust, he insisted on the usage of the psalms specified in the new Welsh funeral rite (forbidding James' wish for Psalm 23); when the local water board sent in surveyors for a new dam at Llangyndeyrn, Carmarthenshire, which could have involved the submersion of the entire village, Richards authorised the ringing of the church bells as a warning signal.

Church in Wales titles
| Preceded by John Thomas Davies | Dean of Bangor; 1955–1956 | Succeeded by Islwyn Davies |
| Preceded by William Havard | Bishop of St Davids; 1956–1971 | Succeeded by Eric Roberts |
