= Griffith Williams (bishop) =

Bishop of Ossory (c.1589–1672)

Griffith Williams (c.1589–1672) was the Anglican bishop of Ossory. He was opposed to the Puritans.

== Life ==
Williams was born at Treveilian in the parish of Llanrug, near Carnarvon, in 1589 or 1590, the son of a freeholder in the parish. His mother was a descendant of the house of Penmynydd in Anglesey. He matriculated from Christ Church, Oxford, on 15 June 1604. He was sent there by his uncle, but after his aunt took a dislike to him, his means of support were cut off.

Through John Williams, Williams obtained employment at Cambridge as a private tutor, and was admitted to Jesus College, where he graduated B.A. in 1605-6 and M.A. in 1609. He was incorporated M.A. at Oxford on 10 July 1610, graduated B.D. at Cambridge in 1616, and proceeded D.D. in 1621. He was ordained deacon by the bishop of Rochester and priest by the bishop of Ely, serving as curate at Hanwell in Middlesex. In 1608 he was presented to the rectory of Foxcott in Buckinghamshire by Henry Wriothesley, 3rd Earl of Southampton, and afterwards became lecturer at St. Peter's in Cheapside and at St. Paul's Cathedral for five years.

On 11 January 1611–12 he was instituted rector of St Benet Sherehog in London through the influence of his patron, John Williams, and resigned the rectory of Foxcott. He had strong high-church sympathies, which roused the dislike of the puritans, and after the appearance of his first publication, The Resolution of Pilate, they prevailed on John King, bishop of London, to suspend him in 1616. He was also bound over to appear at Newgate to answer the charges brought against him, but was discharged by Thomas Coventry (afterwards Lord Coventry), who estreated the recognisances of his accusers.

After his suspension, from which he was eventually released on appeal to the prerogative court, he resigned his living, retired for a short time to Cambridge, and, on his return to London, found friends in the archbishop of Canterbury, George Abbot, and in the chancellor, Sir Thomas Egerton, who presented him to the rectory of Llanllechid in Carnarvonshire. Here he became involved almost immediately in a dispute with his diocesan, Lewis Bayly, bishop of Bangor, a strong puritan, to whom his ecclesiastical views cannot have been acceptable. Bayly wished him to exchange his living for another, and, on his refusal, presented articles against him ex officio. Williams appealed to the court of arches, and Abbot came to his rescue, reprimanding Bayly, and giving Williams licence to preach through several dioceses in his province.

=== London and Bangor ===
Four years later, however, finding his position intolerable, after a visit to Cambridge he returned to London, and in 1625 became domestic chaplain to Philip Herbert, 1st earl of Montgomery (afterwards 4th Earl of Pembroke), and tutor to his children. In 1626 he was presented to the rectory of Trefdraeth in Anglesey. On 17 July 1628 he was installed prebendary of the eighth stall at Westminster, and on 28 March 1634 he was instituted dean of Bangor. About 1636 he was appointed a royal chaplain. He was on the point of being nominated tutor to Prince Charles and the Duke of Gloucester, but at the last moment William Laud, who disliked him in spite of their theological sympathies, obtained the appointment of Brian Duppa instead. Williams also states that "before he was forty years old, he narrowly escaped being elected bishop of St. Asaph," probably on the death of John Hanmer, but on that occasion also saw another preferred to him at the instance of Laud.

=== Ossory ===
In 1641 he was raised to the Irish see of Ossory by a patent dated 11 September. He had resigned his prebend a few months before, but retained his deanery in commendam till his death. On 26 September he was consecrated, but in less than a month he was forced to fly to England by the outbreak of the Irish rebellion of 1641. He came to Apethorpe in Northamptonshire, where he possessed a house, and where he had settled his wife and children. On the night of his arrival he was arrested by a troop of cavalry, under Captain Flaxon, and carried before the parliamentary commissioners at Northampton.

His position was perilous, for he had with him the manuscript of his Vindiciæ Regum, with the words "The Grand Rebellion" written largely on the cover. The sheets were actually in the hands of Sir John North, one of the commissioners, but Williams contrived to get it from him before he had looked at the title, and afterwards, by representing himself as a victim of the Irish rebels, he procured a safe-conduct and the restitution of his belongings. He immediately rejoined the king, and attended him, as chaplain, at the battle of Edgehill on 23 October 1642.

=== 1642–1644 ===
Early in 1643 he published his Vindiciæ Regum, or the Grand Rebellion; that is a Looking-glass for Rebels, whereby they may see, how by Ten Several Degrees they shall ascend to the Heighth [sic] of their Design (Oxford, 4to). This vigorous invective against the parliamentarians attained considerable fame, and was publicly burnt by order of parliament. It immediately drew a reply from John Goodwin, entitled Os Ossorianum, or a Bone for a Bishop to pick, which also appeared in an abridged form, as Os, Ossis, and Oris, within the same year.

In the meantime, after spending most of the winter of 1642–3 at Oxford, Williams retired to Wales to compose a second onslaught on the parliamentarians, The Discovery of Mysteries, or the Plots and Practices of a prevalent Faction in this present Parliament to overthrow the established Religion ... and to subvert the fundamentall Lawes of this famous Kingdome (Oxford, 1643, 4to; 1645, 4to). Falkland, misliking some of its sentiments, desired to suppress it, but he was over-ruled by the king. Its publication earned Williams fresh notoriety and substantial punishment. On 8 March 1643/44, while he was preaching at the university church before the royalist parliament, his house at Apethorpe was plundered by the parliamentary troops, his wife and children driven forth, and his possessions sequestered. His sufferings increased his zeal, and in the following winter appeared Jura Majestatis; the Rights of Kings both in Church and State, granted first by God, secondly, violated by Rebels, and, thirdly, vindicated by the Truth; and the Wickedness of the Faction of this pretended Parliament at Westminster (Oxford, 1644, 4to).

In 1643, shortly before his last work was published, he was employed by the king to try to bring over his patron, the Earl of Pembroke. Repairing to London he found the earl in bed, and so incensed him by his exhortations that he was forced to retire hastily in great dread that the earl would deliver him into the hands of parliament.

On trying to quit the city he was stopped and brought before the lord mayor, to whom he said that "he was a poor pillaged preacher from Ireland, who came to London to see his friends," and now desired to go to some friends in Northampton. By this means he obtained a pass to Northampton and reached Oxford, whence, shortly after, he passed into Wales, and thence to Ireland. During these years he contributed to the royal cause as freely from his purse as with his pen, giving the king the greater part of his private revenue.

=== 1645–1660 ===
In 1645 he visited England and had an interview with the king, and on his return found himself in Anglesey when it submitted to General Thomas Mytton. After in vain exhorting the royalists to resist, he managed by a succession of adroit stratagems to reach Ireland, and on 1 April 1647 was presented to the rectory of Rathfarnham, near Dublin. He resided in that city until its surrender in the same year, when he was included by name in the benefits of the capitulation. Ormonde sent him a sum of money to relieve his necessities, but on his way to Wales, to live on a small patrimony he possessed there, he was taken prisoner by Captain Beeche, who robbed him of all he had and left him to make his way back to Dublin in a destitute condition. Dr. Loftus furnished him with money to carry him to London, and he appealed to the committee of sequestrations for the benefits of the Dublin capitulation. On learning that he was the author of Vindiciæ Regum, the committee told him he deserved to have his head cut off, and passed on to the next business without giving him any redress. Armed with a letter from Fairfax, he had better fortune with the committees at Northampton and Anglesey, to which he was driven by poverty to resort on foot. After regaining his small possessions, he lived at his house in Llanllechid in great poverty, preparing his Great Antichrist for press. His old patron, Pembroke, offered him a valuable living in Lancashire if he would submit to parliament; but this he refused, as well as an offer of Henry Cromwell's of £100 a year on the same terms. In 1651, when Charles was marching on Worcester, he preached before the judges at Conway, and manifested such strong royalist tendencies that he saved himself only by flight.

=== Return to Ireland ===
He made various attempts to get his Great Antichrist printed, but could find no one bold enough to venture on it. In 1660, while crossing to Ireland, he heard at Holyhead the news of the Restoration, and the next morning, preaching in Dublin at St. Bride's, was the first in Ireland to pray publicly for the king. He further celebrated the event by the publication of his 'O' Αντιχριστός, the Great Antichrist revealed (London, 1660, fol.), in which he triumphantly showed antichrist to be "neither pope nor Turk," but the Westminster Assembly, whom he characterised in the title as a "collected pack or multitude of hypocritical, heretical, blasphemous, and most scandalous wicked men, that have fulfilled all the prophesies of the Scripture, which have forespoken of the coming of the great Antichrist."

On repairing to his diocese he found his palace and cathedral in ruins, and was immediately involved in numerous lawsuits in his endeavours to recover the alienated lands of the see, in which he was generally unsuccessful. In 1664 he published The Persecution and Oppression of John Bale, Bishop of Ossory, and of Griffith Williams, that was called to the same Bishopric (London, 4to), an animated autobiography, to which he appended a description of the distressed condition of the clergy of his diocese. Some statements in the appendix drew down the censure of the upper house of convocation at Dublin, and he was reduced to plead that they had inadvertently slipped in. He spent considerable sums in restoring his cathedral and repairing the damage wrought by the rebels.

For some years he held the prebendary of Mayne in his diocese in commendam, exchanging it on 21 Feb 1671-2 for the precentorship, which, however, he resigned on 14 March. Rumours of his death were rife in 1671, but he died on 29 March 1672, and was buried in his cathedral at Kilkenny. He left property to endow almshouses for eight poor widows to be erected in the churchyard of the cathedral, and also bequeathed his lands in Llanllechid for the benefit of the poor. Both his successors had some degree of connection with the Bangor area of Wales.

=== Marriage ===
By his wife Anne he left children. He was not always on good terms with her, and in October 1635 she brought a suit for alimony against him in the court of high commission, but the case terminated in a reconciliation.

== Works ==
Besides the works already mentioned, Williams was the author of:

- The Delights of the Saints, London, 1622, 8vo.
- Seven Golden Candlestickes, holding the Seven Greatest Lights of Christian Religion, London, 1627, 4to.
- The True Church, shewed to all Men that desire to be Members of the Same, London, 1629, fol.
- The Right Way to the Best Religion, London, 1636, fol.
- Seven Treatises very necessary to be observed in these very bad Days, to prevent the Seven Last Vials of God's Wrath, that the Seven Angels are to pour down upon the Earth, London, 1661, fol.
- The Description and the Practice of the four most admirable Beasts explained in Four Sermons, London, 1663, 4to.
- A True Relation of a Law Proceeding, betwixt ... Griffith, lord bishop of Ossory, and Sir G. Ayskue, London, 1663, 4to.
- Several Sermons on Solemn Occasions and Treatises, London, 1665, 4to.
- Four Treatises, London, 1667, 4to.

To him also has been ascribed An Examination of such Particulars in the Solemne League and Covenant as concern the Law; proving it to be destructive of the Lawes of England, both Ancient and Moderne, Oxford, 1644, 4to.

== Notes ==
Church of England titles
Preceded by Edmund Griffith	Dean of Bangor; 1634–1672	Succeeded by William Lloyd
Preceded by Jonas Wheeler (1613–1640)	Bishop of Ossory; 1641–1673	Succeeded by John Parry
