= Roland Thomas =

Dean of Bangor, Wales from 1570 to 1588

Roland Thomas was Dean of Bangor from 1570 until 1588.

Church in Wales titles
Preceded by Robert Evans	Dean of Bangor; 1570–1588	Succeeded by Henry Rowlands
