= Humphrey Humphreys =

Welsh Anglican Bishop (1648 – 1712)

The Right Reverend Humphrey Humphreys
- Bishop of Hereford
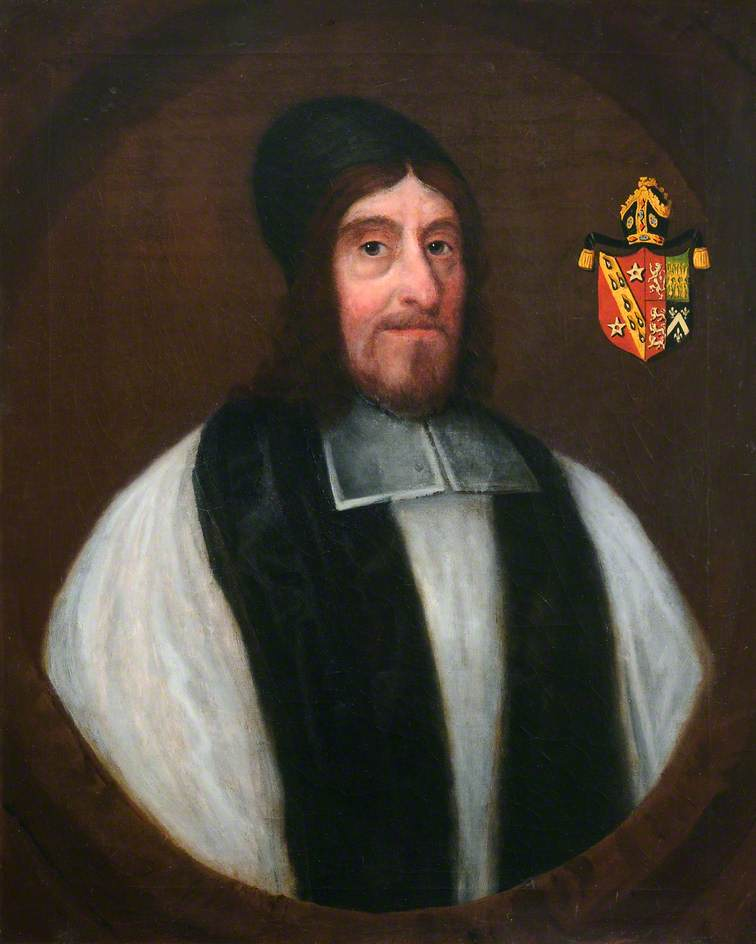
- Church: Church of England
- Diocese: Diocese of Hereford
- In office: 1701–1712
- Predecessor: Gilbert Ironside the younger
- Successor: Philip Bisse
- Other posts: Dean of Bangor (1680–1689); Bishop of Bangor (1689–1701)

Orders
- Consecration: 30 June 1689 by Henry Compton

Personal details
- Born: 24 November 1648
- Died: 20 November 1712 (aged 63)
- Denomination: Anglican
- Spouse: Elizabeth Morgan (m.1681)
- Education: Jesus College, Oxford

Humphrey Humphreys (24 November 1648 – 20 November 1712) was successively Bishop of Bangor (1689–1701) and Bishop of Hereford (1701–1712).

== Early life and education ==
Humphrey Humphreys was born 24 November 1648 in Hendre, Penrhyndeudraeth, the eldest son of Richard Humphreys and Margaret, daughter of Robert Wynne of Cesailgyfarch, Caernarfonshire. He was educated at Oswestry and Bangor grammar schools, and then at Jesus College, Oxford, graduating B.A. 1669, M.A. 1672, being elected a Fellow of Jesus College 1672–3, B.D. 1679, and D.D. 1682. His step sister Catherine Humphreys, married Welsh priest and antiquarian John Ellis (1674 – 1735) in 1720.

== Career ==
He served as chaplain to the Bishop of Bangor, then as rector of Llanfrothen (1670) and Trawsfynydd (1672). He was Dean of Bangor from 1680, and elected Bishop on 30 June 1689. He was an energetic bishop and used the Welsh language as well as English to communicate within his diocese.

He was translated to become Bishop of Hereford in November 1701 although he was not keen on this promotion. He served in this position until his death in 1712.

A patron of Welsh literature, genealogical research and of the then newly formed Society for Promoting Christian Knowledge (SPCK), Humphreys stands out among Welsh bishops of his period. Edward Lhuyd spoke highly of his competence as an antiquarian, describing him as "incomparably the best skill'd in our Antiquities of any person in Wales".

== Personal life ==
Humphreys married Elizabeth, daughter of bishop Robert Morgan of Henblas, Anglesey in 1681. They had two surviving children, Margaret and Ann. He died in Hereford on 20 November 1712.

Church of England titles
Preceded by William Lloyd	Dean of Bangor; 1680–1689	Succeeded by John Jones
Preceded by Humphrey Lloyd	Bishop of Bangor; 1689–1701	Succeeded by John Evans
Preceded by Gilbert Ironside the younger	Bishop of Hereford; 1701–1712	Succeeded by Philip Bisse
