= Thomas Jones (priest) =

Welsh Anglican clergyman

Thomas Jones (died 1682) was a Welsh Anglican clergyman. He was a firm defender of the position of the Church of England, and encountered considerable difficulties and hardship when he accused the Bishop of Winchester, George Morley, of disloyalty to the church. Jones wrote a number of tracts setting forward his defence of the church.

== Life ==
Jones was born in Oswestry, Shropshire; his father, John Williams, was originally from Pwllheli, Caernarfonshire, North Wales. He studied in Oswestry before moving to Jesus College, Oxford in 1641. His studies were interrupted in 1642 by the English Civil War. He returned in 1646, and the parliamentary authorities in control of the university appointed him to a fellowship at University College, Oxford in 1649. He obtained his Bachelor of Arts degree in 1650 and his Master of Arts degree in 1651. He was appointed rector of Castle Caereinion in Montgomeryshire in 1654, but lost this post at the Restoration in 1661. He later became chaplain to Richard Vaughan, 2nd Earl of Carbery and, in 1663, domestic and naval chaplain to James, Duke of York (later King James II).

Jones encountered difficulties when the duke's wife, Anne Hyde, announced her intention to convert to the Catholic Church. He accused her chaplain, George Morley (the Bishop of Winchester), of misguiding the duchess and of disloyalty to the Church of England. Jones lost his position as chaplain to the duke, but was appointed rector of Llandyrnog by the duke in 1665. His argument with Morley continued, however, and he was fined £300 in 1670 by the Court of King's Bench for calling Morley a "promoter of popery and a subverter of the church of England" in front of Robert Morgan, the Bishop of Bangor. Further trouble ensued as Morgan wished to reunite the rectory of Llandyrnog with the bishopric of Bangor, the two positions having been held together previously. Jones had the income from his parish sequestered to pay the fine, leaving him ruined.

He was a staunch defender of the Church of England, publishing various tracts setting out his strong views. Of the Heart and its Right Sovereign; and Rome No Mother-Church to England and A remembrance of the rights of Jerusalem above, in the great question, where is the true mother-church of Christians? were both written in 1678. Three years later, he wrote Some letters and papers from a late chaplain to the duke of York … touching the beginning of this plot and danger to the nation from masquerade protestants. His last work was Elymas the sorcerer, or, A memorial towards the discovery of the bottom of this Popish-Plot, publish'd upon the occasion of a passage in the late dutchess of York's declaration for changing her religion, written in 1682, and restating his accusations against Morley; Morley replied in various treatises published in the following year. Jones suffered from failing sight and mental health towards the end of his life, still afflicted by the loss of his chaplaincy, and died on 8 October 1682.
