= Fronfraith Hall =

Fronfraith, Llandyssil, Powys
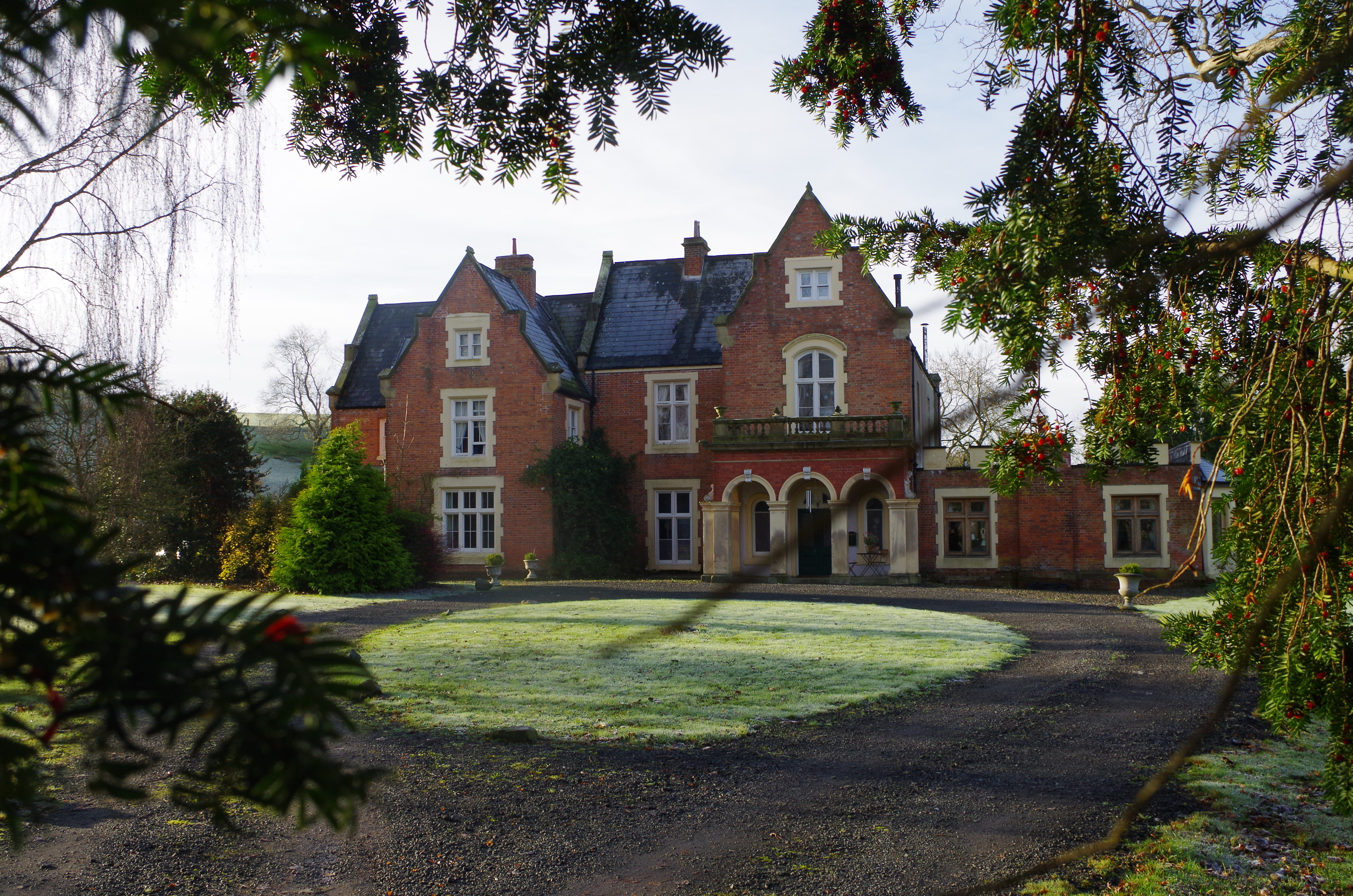
- Fronfraith Hall 2014

- Location in Powys

General information
- Location: Powys, Wales, UK
- Coordinates: 52.532335°N 3.225624°W

Fronfraith Hall is a mid-Victorian house in the historic parish of Llandyssil in the shire area of Montgomeryshire in Powys. Fronfraith also appears in records as Bronfraith and Vronvraith. Fronfraith was also a township within the parish of Llandyssil. The present house was built in 1863 under the supervision of the Shrewsbury architect James Pickard This house replaced a large house, probably a half-timbered Tudor mansion, which had been the home of the Morgan family. In 1966, the west wing of the Fronfraith Hall was badly damaged as the result of a fire, but has now been restored. The Hall is now partly used as a guest house.

== History ==
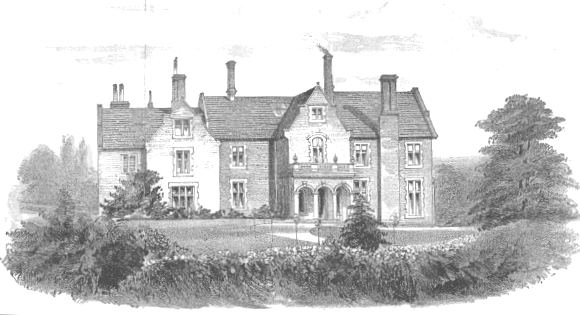
Fronfraith Hall, Llandyssil

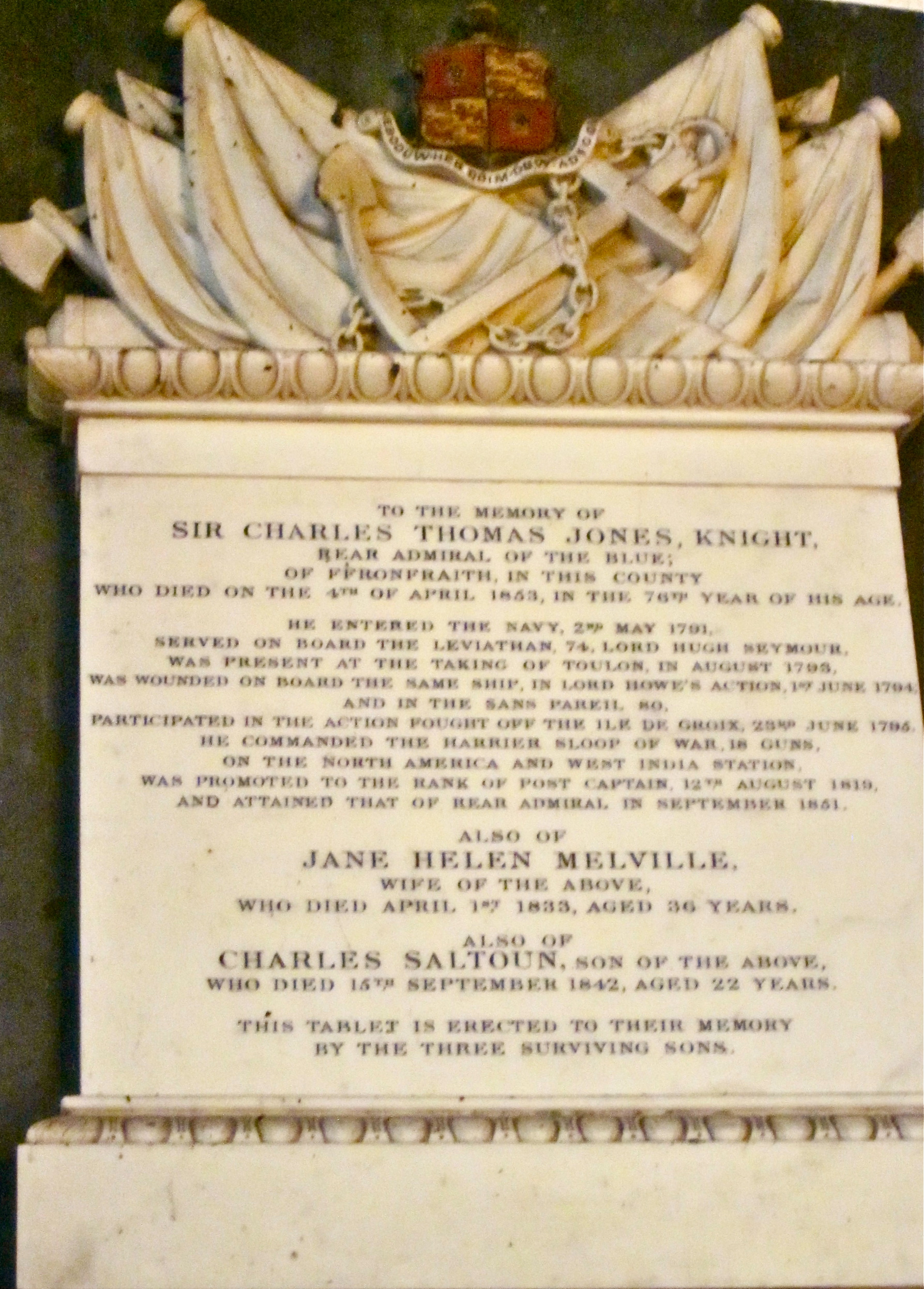
Monument to Sir Charles Thomas Jones, Montgomery Church

The first family to be associated with Fronfraith were the Morgans. Richard Morgan who lived at Fronfraith, was elected MP for Montgomery Boroughs in 1592–3. He was married to Margaret Lloyd, daughter of Thomas Lloyd of Gwernabuarth, in Llandyssil. His third son Robert Morgan (1608–1673) in 1660 became Archdeacon of Merioneth in 1660 and was consecrated Bishop of Bangor in 1666.

In the 18th century Fronfraith had passed to the Jones family. A notable member of the family was Rear Admiral Sir Charles Thomas Jones (1778–1853). Jones saw distinguished service in the Royal Navy and was knighted in 1809. He was High Sheriff of Montgomeryshire 1832. A fine memorial to Admiral is in Montgomery Church, where he is buried. After his death the new house was built, probably by Captain Maurice Jones, who was living there 1868. A family dispute then arose and on the order of the Court of Chancery the Fronfraith Estate was put up for sale, and was sold at auction as single lot, in Manchester on 21 July 1871. Fronfraith Hall is described as A Newly Erected Handsome, Large and Commodious Mansion… Charmingly situated and replete with every convenience, suited for a family of distinction, and surrounded by a beautiful and Romantic Park, studded with Ornamental and Choice Trees, and Terraces commanding the Most Extensive, Picturesque and Varied Views. The Estate consisted of 630 Acres… of excellent pasture, meadow and arable land, woods and plantations... producing a rental of £1,028. 11s. 4. per annum.

The Fronfraith Estate was acquired by Charles Whitely Owen, who was High Sheriff of Montgomeryshire in 1887. In 1918, following the death of Charles Whitely Owen the Estate passed to Gilbert Saltoun Jones, who, on inheriting, changed his name to Gilbert Whitely Owen. On his death in 1926, the Estate was inherited by Captain and Mrs Cordeaux. They were to put it up for auction September 1931 and it was sold, with exception of the Waterloo Public House to John Crawford Allen of Croydon. Allen must have been a property speculator because in 1932, he sold it to Senator Rupert Davies (1879–1967), Canadian politician and newspaper editor, who was born in Welshpool. Davies continued to use it as his home in Wales until he sold it in 1948. His son, Robertson Davies (1913–1995), the noted Canadian novelist and Shakespearian scholar, lived at times at Fronfraith in the late 1930s. The estate was sold by auction in 1948 to the Humphreys family of Llwynmaddoc in Llandyssil. The house and its surrounding grounds were sold off separately in 1969.
