= William Pollard =

William Pollard may refer to:

- William Pollard (Quaker) (1828–1893), English Quaker writer and minister
- William G. Pollard (1911–1989), American physicist and Episcopal priest
- William L. Pollard, American university president
- William B. Pollard III (born 1947), judge of the United States Court of Military Commission Review.
- William Pollard (priest), dean of Bangor, 1410
