= Thomas Skeffington =

Thomas Skeffington may refer to:

- Thomas Skeffington, 2nd Viscount Ferrard (1772–1843), Irish peer
- Thomas Skeffington (MP) (1550-1600), English Member of Parliament for Leicestershire (UK Parliament constituency)
- Thomas Skevington or Skeffington (died 1533), English Bishop of Bangor
