= Ringstead =

Ringstead may refer to:

== Places ==
- Ringstead, Dorset, England
- Ringstead, Norfolk, England
- Ringstead, Northamptonshire, England

== People ==
- Alf Ringstead (1927–2000), former Sheffield United footballer
- Thomas de Ringstead (died 1366), an English Dominican and Bishop of Bangor

== See also ==
- Ringsted (disambiguation)
- Ringsteadia
