= Bangor Cathedral =

- Saint Deiniol's Cathedral in Bangor
- Cadeirlan Deiniol Sant ym Mangor
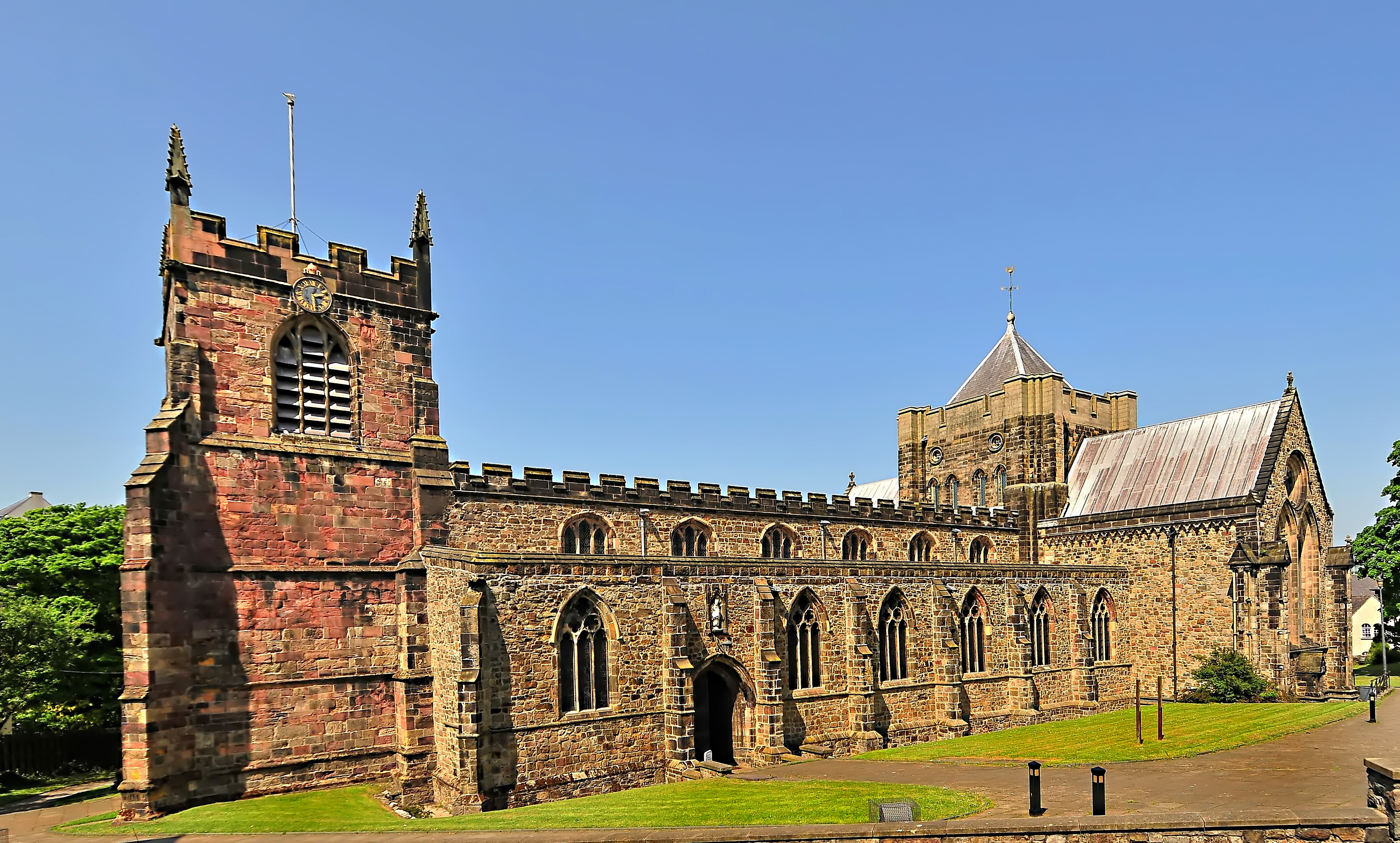
- Bangor Cathedral
- Bangor Cathedral
- 53°13′36″N 4°7′39″W
- Location: Bangor, Gwynedd
- Country: Wales
- Denomination: Church in Wales
- Previous denomination: Roman Catholic
- Website: bangorcathedral.churchinwales.org.uk

History
- Founded: AD 525
- Founder: Saint Deiniol
- Dedicated: AD 525
- Consecrated: AD 546

Architecture
- Architect: George Gilbert Scott
- Style: Romanesque, Gothic

Administration
- Province: Wales
- Diocese: Bangor
- Archdeaconry: Bangor
- Parish: Bro Deiniol

Clergy
- Bishop: Vacant
- Dean: Manon Ceridwen James

Bangor Cathedral (Welsh: Eglwys Gadeiriol Bangor) is the cathedral church of Bangor, Gwynedd, Wales. It is dedicated to its founder, Saint Deiniol.

The site of the present building of Bangor Cathedral has been in use as a place of Christian worship since the sixth century. The cathedral was built on a low-lying and inconspicuous site, possibly so as not to attract the attention of Viking raiders from the sea in ancient times.

== History ==
The site of Bangor Cathedral was originally occupied by St Deiniol's Monastery, established in the sixth century around 530 on land given by the king of Gwynedd, Maelgwn Gwynedd. Deiniol is said to have been consecrated as a bishop by Saint David, making him the first Bishop of Bangor. This monastery was sacked in 634 and again in 1073. Nothing of the original building survives.

The Synod of Westminster in 1102 is recorded as taking measures to restore Bangor Cathedral, but the earliest part of the present building was built during the episcopate of Bishop David (1120–1139) with the assistance of the king of Gwynedd, Gruffudd ap Cynan, who donated money towards the project and was buried by the high altar on his death in 1137. This was a cruciform building in the Norman style, about 44 yards in length. Gruffudd's son, Owain Gwynedd, was also buried here, as was his brother Cadwaladr.

Giraldus Cambrensis describes a service held here in 1188 when the Archbishop of Canterbury celebrated Mass during their tour of Wales recruiting men for the Third Crusade.

In 1211, the cathedral was destroyed by King John's army, on a raid into Gwynedd.

In the 13th century the original apse was removed and the choir was extended to its present length. The church was badly damaged when King Edward I invaded Gwynedd in 1282, and in 1284 the dean and chapter were given £60 in compensation for the damage. There was extensive rebuilding in this period, under the first Bishop Anian, with the transepts and crossing rebuilt. The nave was rebuilt in the late 14th century.

The cathedral was said to have been burnt to the ground in 1402 during the rebellion of Owain Glyndŵr, but there is no contemporary evidence for this, though it may well have been damaged. There certainly was extensive reconstruction from the end of the 15th century, completed in 1532. There is a Latin inscription over the tower doorway recording that Bishop Thomas Skevington built the tower in 1532, though it was not complete when Skevington died in 1533. Some work was done during the 18th century and £2,000 was spent on repairs in 1824, followed by the altering and refitting of the interior in 1825 at a cost of a further £3,252.

Rowland Meyrick, the second son of Meyric ap Llewelyn, was the first Bishop of Bangor following the Reformation and is buried under the cathedral. Meyric ap Llewelyn was High Sheriff and Captain of the Guard at the coronation of Henry VIII on 26 April 1509.

From July to September 2021 the cathedral was used as a COVID-19 vaccination centre for five days a week, and for socially-distanced worship.

== Architecture ==
The building as seen today is the result of extensive work carried out under the supervision of George Gilbert Scott, starting in 1868. Scott's design originally called for a high central tower and spire, but this was never completed as cracks appeared which were thought to indicate subsidence of the foundations. The tower was therefore left as a low structure. In 1879 £11,000 was spent on the restoration of the nave, chapter house and central tower. Lord Penrhyn contributed £2,000.

== Features of interest ==
The cathedral contains the "Mostyn Christ", a figure of the Pensive Christ carved in oak and thought to date from the late 15th century, depicting Christ prior to the crucifixion, seated on a rock and wearing the crown of thorns.

In the grounds of the cathedral, the "Biblical Garden" is planted with an example of every plant mentioned in the Bible.

The cathedral also contains a number of pieces of woodwork created by Robert Thompson, including 5 of his famous wooden mice.

== Clock ==
In 1842 the Bishop of Bangor, Rt. Revd. Christopher Bethell presented the cathedral with a new clock by J. B. Joyce & Co of Whitchurch. The frame was 5 feet 6 inches (1.68 m) and the diameter of the main wheel was 18 inches (46 cm). It included a maintaining power to keep the clock running whilst it was being wound up. It was equipped with a half dead beat escapement acting on a pendulum of 13 feet (4.0 m) length and a bob weight of 160 pounds (73 kg).

== Burials ==
- Rowland Meyrick, a Welsh Bishop of Bangor (1559–1566)
- Nicholas Robinson (bishop) – on the south side of the high altar
- Henry Rowlands (bishop) – in the choir, before the high altar
- Edmund Griffith, a Welsh Bishop of Bangor (1634–1637) – buried in the choir
- Robert Morgan (bishop), a Welsh Bishop of Bangor (1666–1673) – buried in the grave of Bishop Nicholas Robinson
- Humphrey Lloyd (bishop), Bishop of Bangor (1674–1689)
- Gruffydd ap Cynan, King of Gwynedd – high altar
- Owain Gwynedd, King of Gwynedd. Originally by the high altar next to his father Gruffydd ap Cynan, but moved beneath the wall of the Lady chapel / south crossing
- Gwilym Owen Williams - Bishop of Bangor (1957 - 1982) and Archbishop of Wales (1971 - 1982), died on the 23rd December 1990 and buried in the Lady Chapel next to his wife, Megan
- Phillip Anthony Crockett - 80th Bishop of Bangor, died 30 June 2008 and buried in the Lady Chapel
- Thomas Erwyd Pryse Edwards, Dean of Bangor, died 11 March 2011 buried in the Lady Chapel.

== List of Deans ==
The Dean is head of the cathedral chapter. There have been fifty-seven recorded Deans.

Following Kathy Jones leaving the position in 2021, it was left vacant until July 2025, when Manon Ceridwen James, then Canon Theologian of Newport Cathedral, was announced as the new dean by Bangor Cathedral Chapter. James' appointment followed on a visitation and a safeguarding audit having raised concerns regarding the leadership, culture and “inappropriate behaviours” at the cathedral. As part of its remedial recommendations, the visitation report proposed a new dean be appointed urgently.

Previous deans include:

- 1162 Arthur de Bardsey
- 1236 Guy
- 1254 William
- 1286 Kyndelw
- 1328 Adam
- 1371 Hywel ap Goronwy
- 1371:1382 John Martyn
- 1389 Walter de Swaffham
- 1396 William Clyve
- 1397 David Daron
- 1410 William Pollard
- 1410 Henry Honore
- 1413–1416 Roger Wodele
- 1423–1436 Nigel Bondeby
- 1445 John Martin
- 1464 Hugh Alcock
- 1468 Huw Morgan
- 1480–1502 Richard Cyffin
- 1502 David Yale
- 1503 Richard Cowland
- 1509–1534 John Glynne
- 1534–1554 Robert Evans
- 1554 Rhys Powell
- 1557 Robert Evans (again)
- 1570 Roland Thomas
- 1588–1593 Held by the Bishop in commendam
- 1593 Henry Rowlands
- 1599–1604 Richard Parry
- 1605 John Williams
- 1613 Edmund Griffith
- 1634 Griffith Williams
- 1672 William Lloyd
- 1680 Humphrey Humphreys
- 1689 John Jones
- 1727 Peter Maurice
- 1750 Hughe Hughes
- 1753 Thomas Lloyd
- 1793–1838 John Warren
- 1838–1862 James Cotton
- 1862–1876 James Vincent
- 1876–1884 Henry Edwards
- 1884–1901 Evan Lewis
- 1902–1903 John Pryce
- 1903–1934 Griffith Roberts
- 1934–1940 Henry James
- 1940–1941 Thomas Edwards
- 1941–1955 John Thomas Davies
- 1955–1956 John Richards
- 1957–1961 Islwyn Davies
- 1962–1971 Gwynfryn Richards
- 1971–?1976 Benjamin Vaughan
- 1976–1988 Ivor Rees
- 1988-1998 Thomas Edwards
- 1998–2003 Trevor Evans
- 2004–2011 Alun Hawkins
- 2011–2015 Sue Jones
- 2016–2021 Kathy Jones
- 2025 - 2026 Manon Ceridwen James

== Organ ==
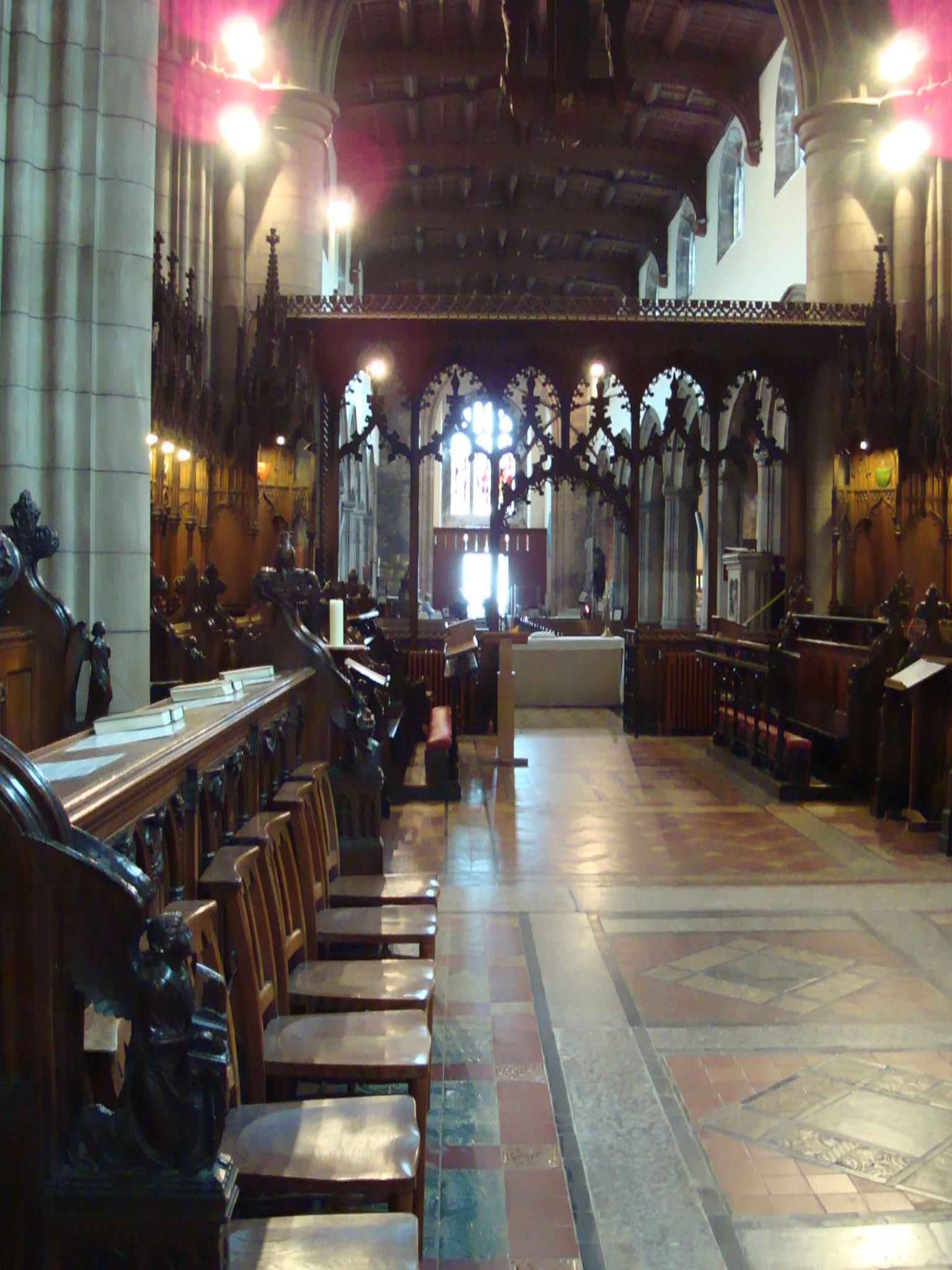
The Quire

The first extant reference to an organ in the cathedral comes in a poem by Gruffudd Gryg, who witnessed the arrival of a new instrument sometime between 1350 and 1370, and records show all the parishioners contributed towards it.

Under Bishop Rowlands (1598–1616) arrangements were made for the payment of a stipend to an organist. However, during the episcopate of the next bishop, Lewis Bayly, we hear of one Thomas Boulton playing the organ and complaining that his salary was not paid!

During the Commonwealth (1649–60) the organ was either removed or destroyed in accordance with the Parliamentary Order "for the speedy demolition of all organs, images and all matters of superstitious monuments in all cathedrals...throughout the kingdom of England and the dominion of Wales."

When Charles II was restored to the throne in 1660 a new organ was installed: it was paid from a legacy of £100 by Bishop William Roberts; and erected by his successor, Robert Morgan. On the organ case was a Latin verse in which the two bishops, who had provided the money and erected the organ, were compared to David and Solomon respectively.

In 1779 the organ was replaced by a new instrument. It cost 360 guineas (£378) and was made by Samuel Green, the leading organ builder of his day. This was in constant use until it was replaced by the present organ which was built by one of the greatest master organ builders of the 19th century: William Hill, who also supplied most of its 4,210 pipes, and installed in 1873, with additions by the same company in 1897.

The organ had a major rebuild in 1954 by John Compton, and since then has been used on a daily basis. Numerous students have benefited from study at this instrument and noted organists from all over the world have visited Bangor Cathedral especially to play the organ and give public concerts.

Between 2006 and 2008, David Wells Organ Builders Ltd of Liverpool rebuilt the organ. The solo soundboard is now located in the crossing arch into the north transept and is the unenclosed choir organ. The choir soundboard in the organ chamber has become the solo soundboard and has been turned round to face through the transept arch. It has been raised high to allow space for toilet and kitchen facilities on the ground floor. A new vestry has been built on the first floor for servers. The new console is placed in the north transept.

A specification of the organ can be found on the National Pipe Organ Register.

=== List of organists and directors of music ===
- 1644 Thomas Bolton
- 1689 (A Vicar Choral) ?
- 1691 Thomas Roberts
- 1705 ? Priest
- 1708 ? Smith
- 1710 ? Ferrer
- 1713 John Rathbone
- 1721 Thomas Rathbone
- 1750 Thomas Lloyd
- 1778 Richard Jarred
- 1782 William Shrubsole
- 1784 Edmund Olive
- 1793 Joseph Pring
- 1842 James Sharpe Pring
- 1868 Robert Roberts
- 1872 Roland Rogers
- 1892 T. Westlake Morgan
- 1906 Roland Rogers (reappointed)
- 1928 Leslie Douglas Paul
- 1970 John Hywel
- 1972 Andrew John Goodwin
- 2009 Graham Eccles

Directors of Music

- 2014 - 2019 Paul Booth
- 2021 - 2025 Joe Cooper

=== Assistant organists ===
- Vernon Oswald Wright 1895–1897
- Llewelyn Jones 1889–1902 (then organist of Christ Church, Llanfairfechan)
- William E. Jones 1902 –
- Michael Mullinar ca. 1909 – ?
- James Griffiths 1964–2007
- Marc Rochester 1978–1980
- Martin Brown 1990–2014

Cathedral organist

- 2014 Martin Brown

The celebrated bard Dafydd ap Gwilym, who wrote in the 14th century, makes particular mention of an organ and choir at Bangor in his time, in a commendatory ode addressed to Hywel, Dean of Bangor. The ode, which was in Welsh, has the following: "Whose organ, and harmonious choir, are unrivalled in performance." Hywel was made Dean of Bangor in 1359 and Bishop in 1370. This ode, therefore, must have been written between 1359 and 1370, and the allusion to an organ implies that there must have been an Organist at that time.

There have been many assistant organists over the years, including Arnold Lewis who became head of music BBC Wales, James Griffiths (1964–2007) and Martin Brown. The post changed title in 2014 and the assistant organist is now known as the cathedral organist. Along with this change the post of "organist and master of the choristers" changed to "director of music".

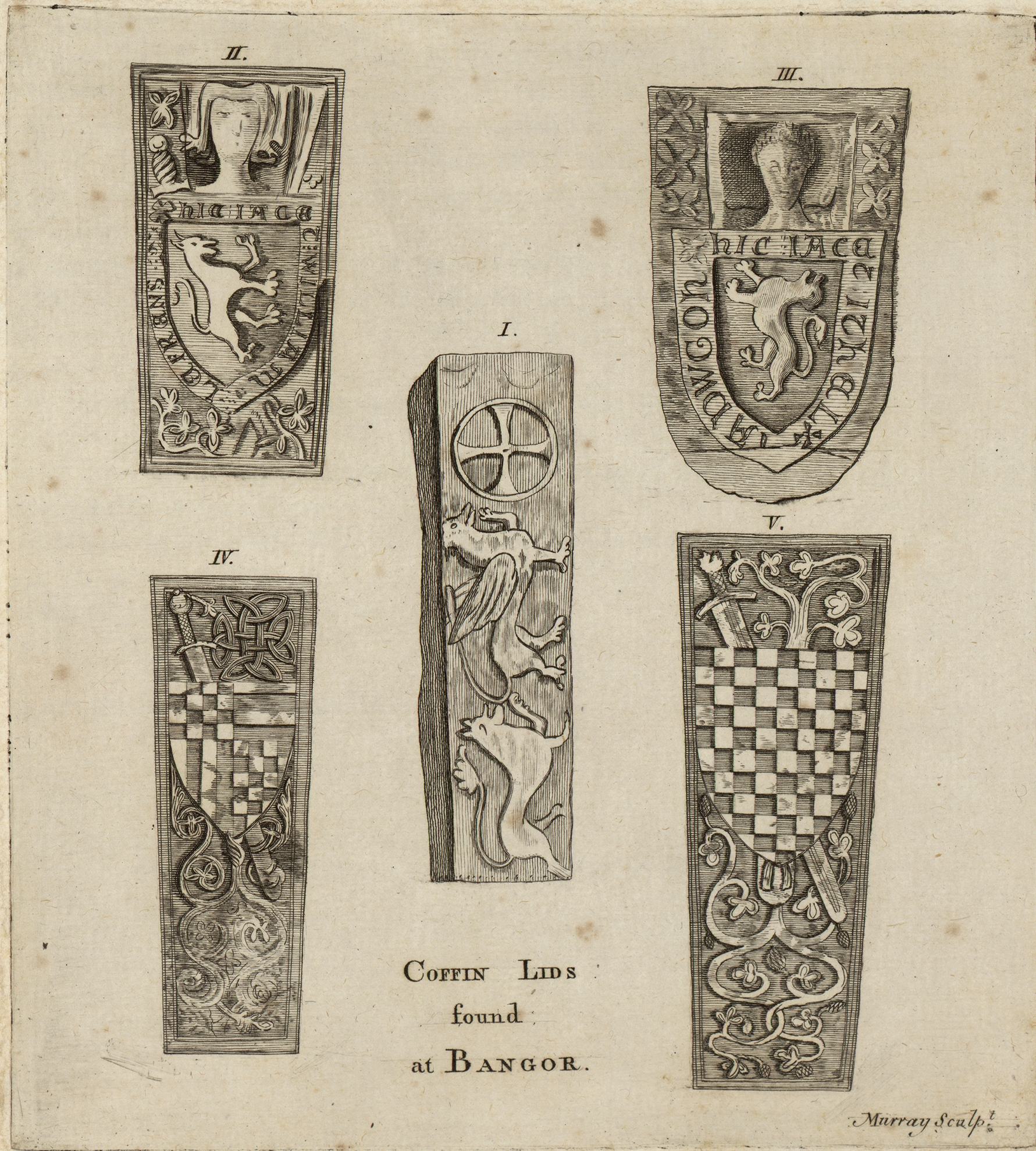
Ancient coffin lids at Bangor. Illustrated for Pennant's A Tour in Wales, 1778

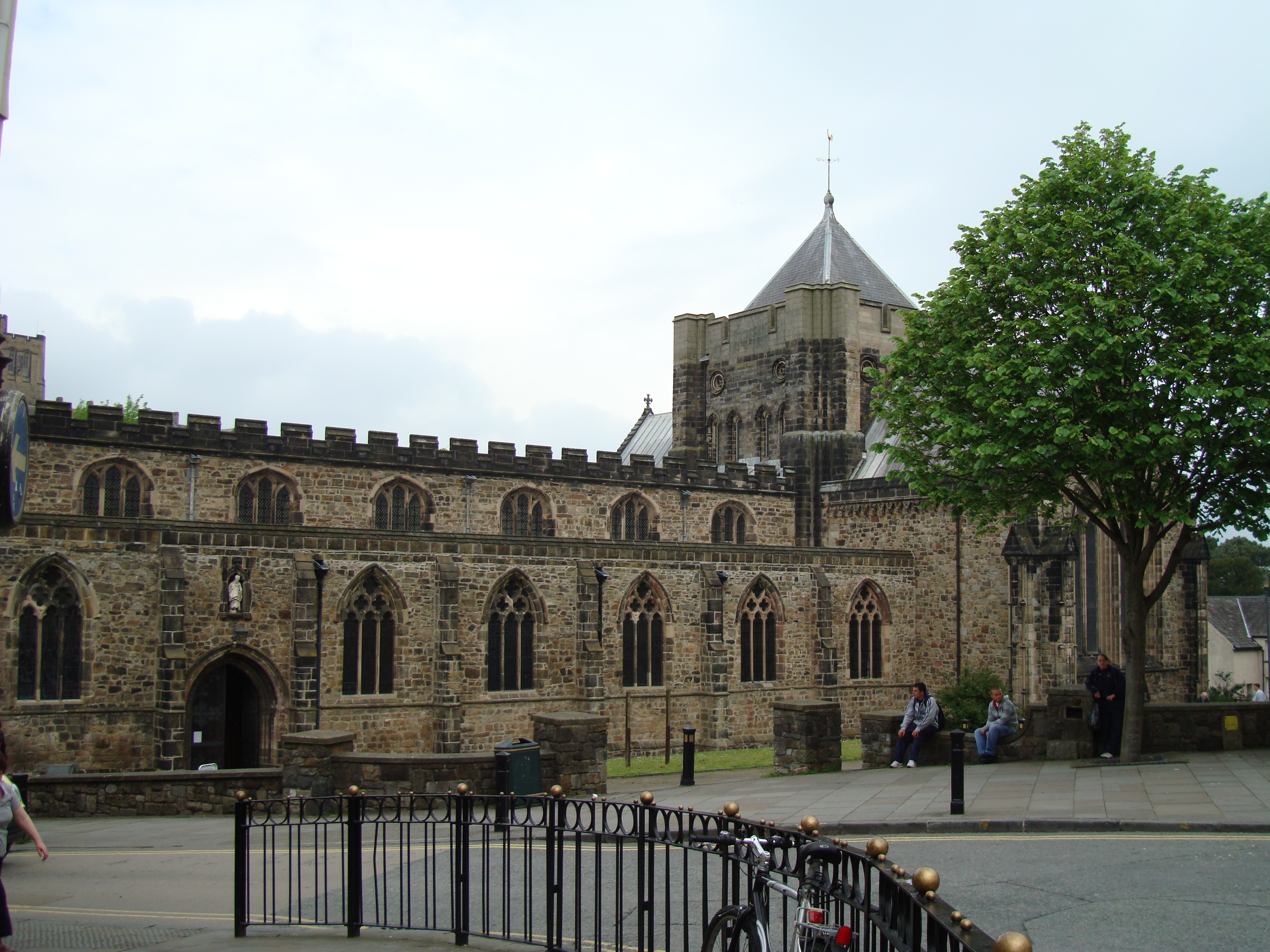
Nave and Central Tower

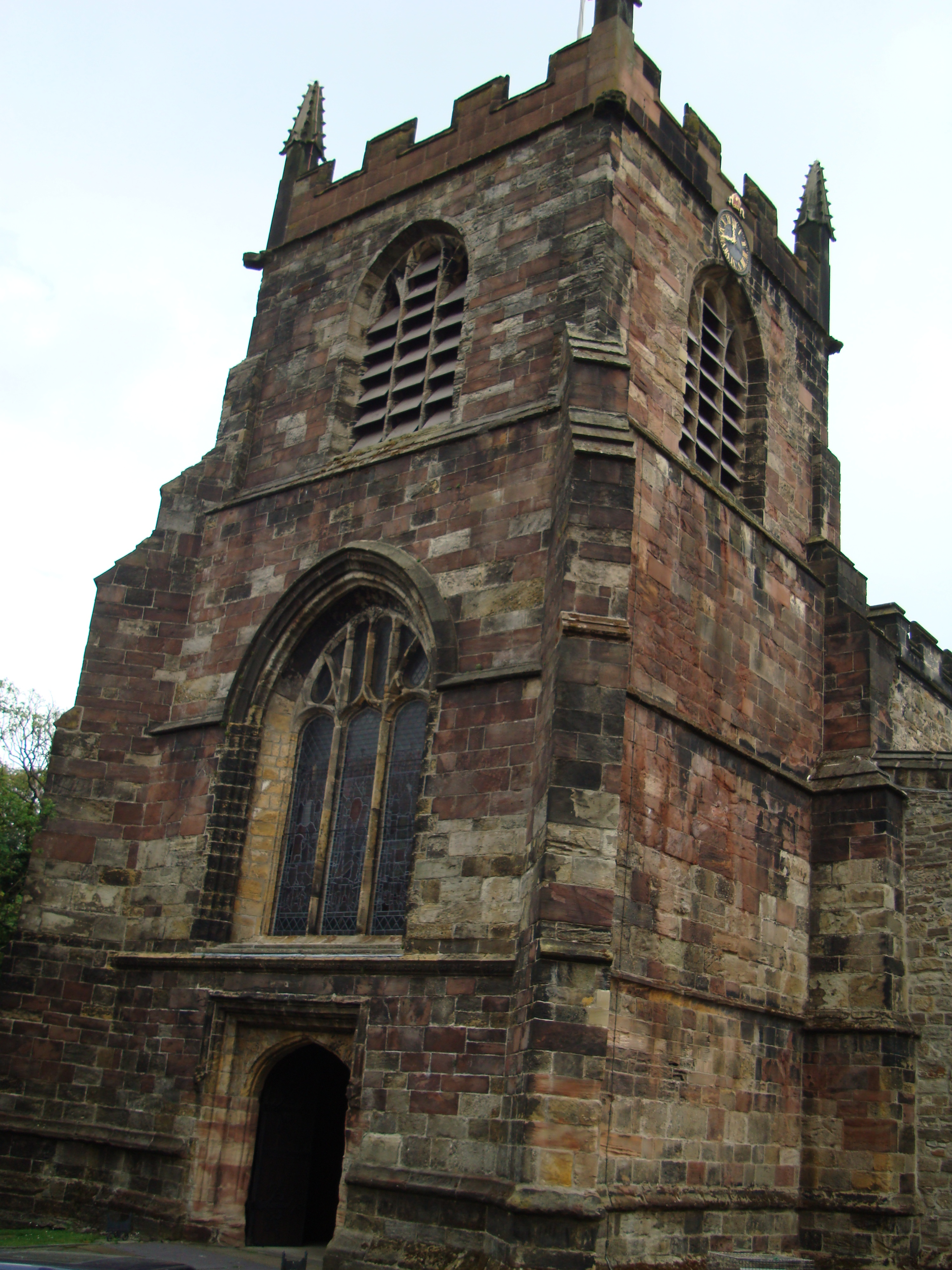
West Tower

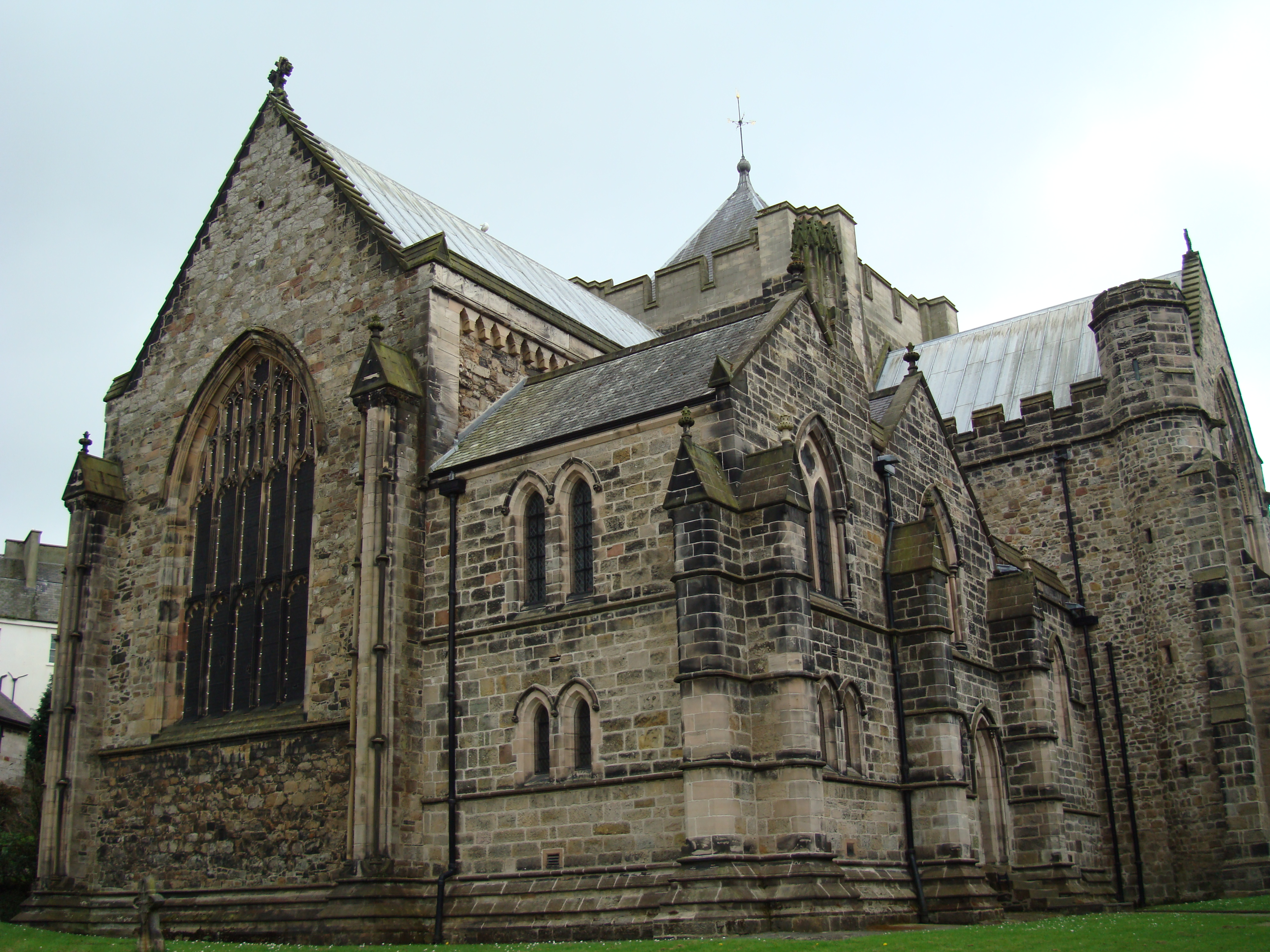
East End and Tower

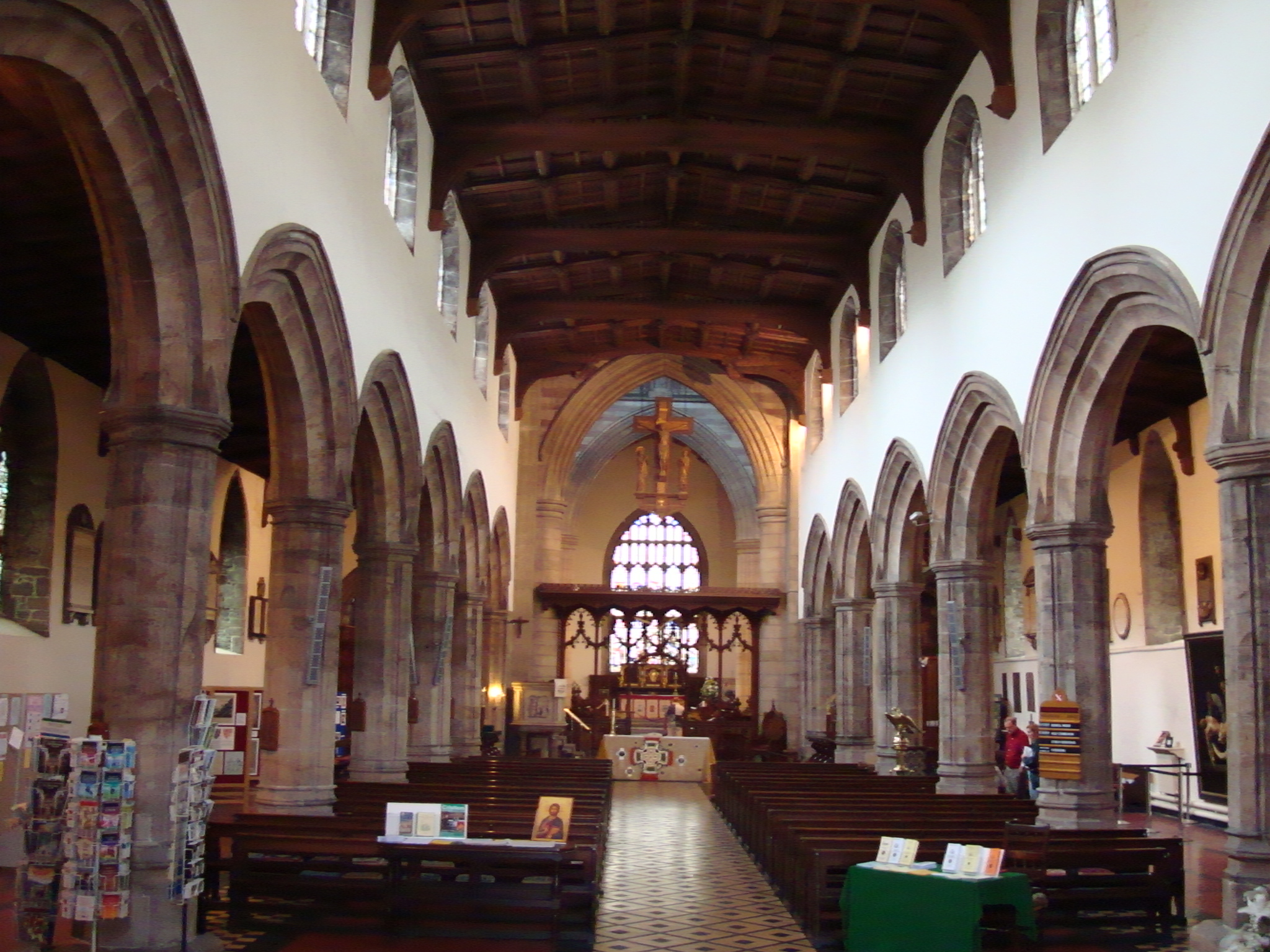
Interior - Nave

== Languages ==
The cathedral caters for both Welsh and English speakers. Among other services, there is regular Holy Communion in each language separately, and bilingual Choral Evensong.

== See also ==
- Bishop of Bangor
- Archdeacon of Bangor
- Archdeacon of Merioneth
- Archdeacon of Anglesey
