= Gilbert Ironside the younger =

English churchman and academic

The Right Reverend Gilbert Ironside
- Bishop of Hereford
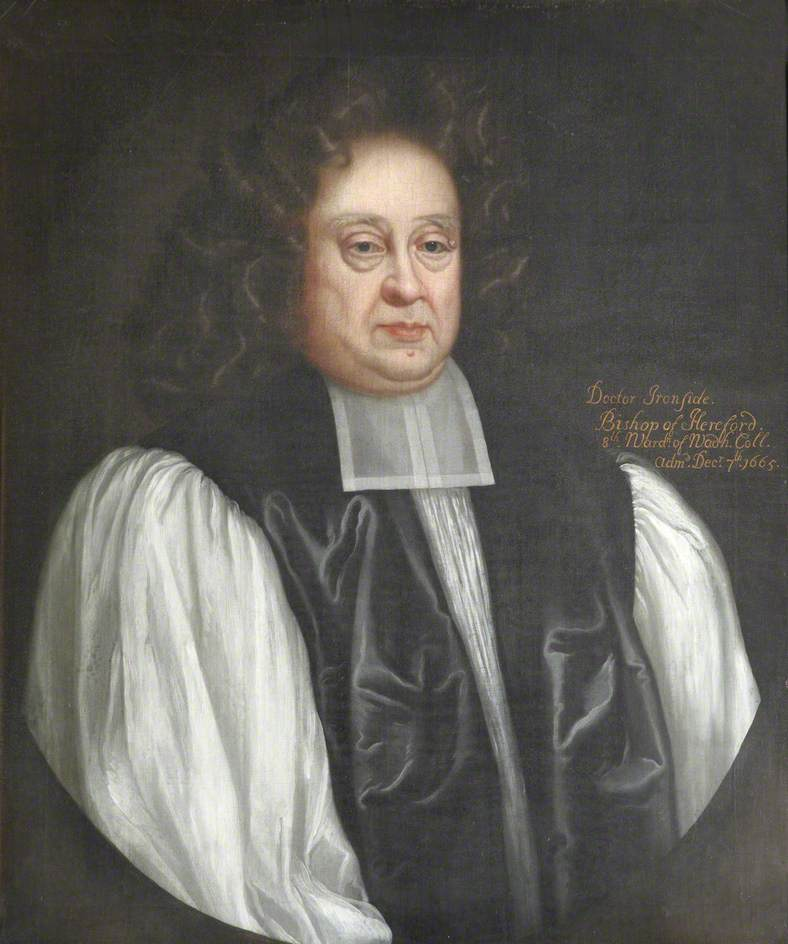
- Church: Church of England
- Diocese: Diocese of Hereford
- In office: 1691–1701
- Predecessor: Herbert Croft
- Successor: Humphrey Humphreys
- Other post: Bishop of Bristol (1689–1691)

Personal details
- Born: 1632 Winterbourne Abbas
- Died: 27 August 1721 London
- Denomination: Anglican
- Education: Wadham College, Oxford

Gilbert Ironside the younger (1632 – 27 August 1701) was an English churchman and academic, Warden of Wadham College, Oxford, from 1667, Bishop of Bristol and Bishop of Hereford.

== Life ==
He was the third son of Gilbert Ironside the elder, born at Winterbourne Abbas. On 14 November 1650, he matriculated at Wadham College, Oxford, where he graduated BA on 4 February 1653, MA on 22 June 1655, BD on 12 October 1664, and DD on 30 June 1666. He became scholar of his college in 1651, fellow in 1656, and was appointed public reader in grammar in 1659, bursar in 1659 and 1661, sub-warden in 1660, and librarian in 1662. He was presented in 1663 to the rectory of Winterbourne Faringdon by Sir John Miller, with which he held from 1666, in succession to his father, the rectory of Winterbourne Steepleton.

On the promotion of Walter Blandford to the See of Oxford, he was elected Warden of Wadham College on 7 December 1665, an office which he held for 25 years until his resignation on 7 October 1689. According to Anthony Wood, he was strongly opposed to the high-handed John Fell, and refused to serve as Vice-Chancellor of the University of Oxford during Fell's lifetime. After Fell's death in 1686, he filled the office from 1687 to 1689. When King James II made his visit to Oxford in September 1687 with the aim of compelling Magdalen College to admit his nominee Anthony Farmer as President, in a discussion with the King, Ironside insisted on the fellows' rights. He declined in November an invitation to dine with the King's special commissioners on the evening after they had expelled the fellows of Magdalen.

After the Glorious Revolution, Ironside was rewarded for his resistance by being appointed bishop of Bristol; the diocese was poor, and Ironside was consecrated, 13 October 1689, on the understanding that he should be translated to a more lucrative see when opportunity offered. On the death of Herbert Croft, he was transferred to the see of Hereford in July 1691. Near the turn of the century when he was about sixty years of age, according to Wood, Ironside married a widow of Bristol, née Robinson. He died on 27 August 1701, and was buried in the church of St. Mary Somerset, Thames Street, London. On the demolition of that church in 1867, the bishop's remains were transferred to Hereford Cathedral.

== Works ==
Ironside published, with a short preface, Nicholas Ridley's account of a disputation at Oxford on the sacrament, together with a letter of John Bradford's (Oxford, 1688), and a sermon preached before the king on 23 November 1684 (Oxford, 1685). A portrait is in the hall of Wadham College.

== Sources ==
- This article incorporates text from a publication now in the public domain: "Ironside, Gilbert (1632-1701)". Dictionary of National Biography. London: Smith, Elder & Co. 1885–1900.

Academic offices
Preceded by Walter Blandford	Warden of Wadham College, Oxford; 1665–1689	Succeeded by Thomas Dunster
Preceded by John Venn	Vice-Chancellor of Oxford University; 1687–1689	Succeeded by Jonathan Edwards
Church of England titles
Preceded by Sir Jonathan Trelawny, 3rd Baronet	Bishop of Bristol; 1689–1691	Succeeded by John Hall
Preceded by Herbert Croft	Bishop of Hereford; 1691–1701	Succeeded by Humphrey Humphreys
