= William Havard =

Welsh bishop and rugby union footballer

The Right Reverend William Havard MC
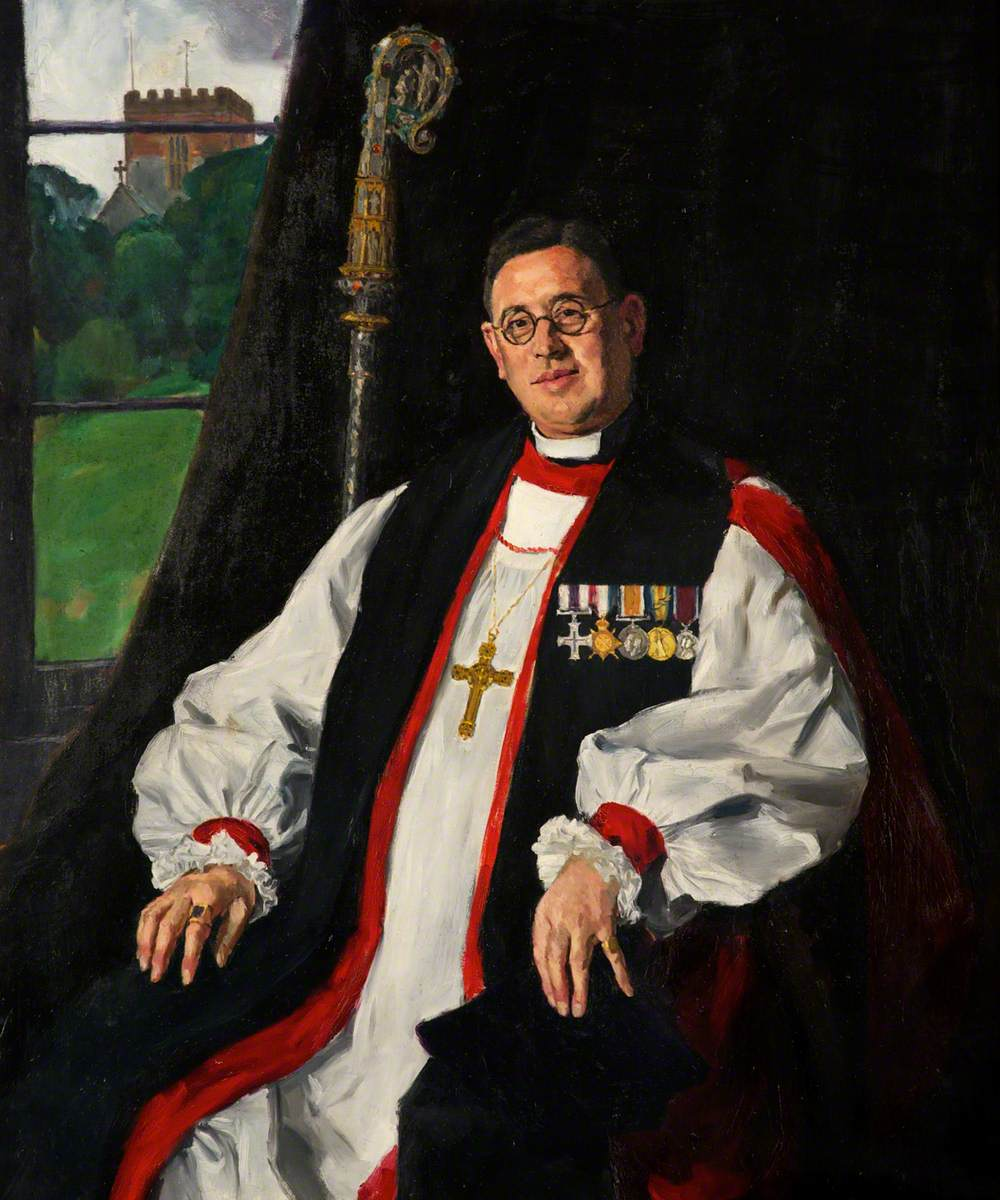
- Portrait by Evan Walters
- Born: William Thomas Havard; 23 October 1889; Defynnog, Powys, Wales
- Died: 17 August 1956 (aged 66); Gwbert-on-Sea, Wales
- Education: Brecon Secondary School
- Alma mater: University College, Aberystwyth; Jesus College, Oxford
- Spouse: Florence Aimée Holmes (m. 1922)
- Bishop of St David's
- Church: Church in Wales
- Diocese: Diocese of St Davids
- Installed: 1950
- Term ended: 1956 (died)
- Predecessor: David Prosser
- Successor: John Richards
- Bishop of St Asaph
- Church: Church in Wales
- Diocese: Diocese of St Asaph
- Installed: 1934
- Term ended: 1950 (translated)
- Predecessor: A. G. Edwards
- Successor: David Bartlett

Rugby union career
- Position: Prop
Amateur team(s)
Years	Team	Apps	(Points)
1913–20	Llanelli RFC	5	(5)
–	London Welsh RFC		
1919–20	Oxford University RFC		
International career
Years	Team	Apps	(Points)
1919	Wales	1	(0)

William Thomas Havard MC (23 October 1889 – 17 August 1956) was a Welsh clergyman and rugby union international player. He served as a military chaplain during the First World War, and later as Bishop of St Asaph and then Bishop of St David's in the Church in Wales.

== Early life ==
Havard was born in Defynnog, Brecknockshire, the third son of William Havard, a deacon of the local congregational chapel, and his wife Gwen. He attended Brecon county school before studying at University College of Wales, Aberystwyth, where he graduated with a 3rd-class BA degree in history in 1912. Having been raised in the congregationalist Christian tradition, he was confirmed as a member of the Church in Wales after graduating. He then trained for ordination at St Michael's College, Llandaff and was ordained deacon in 1913 and priest in 1914. He was curate of Llanelli from 1913 to 1915.

=== First World War ===
During the First World War, Havard served as chaplain to the 10th Battalion, South Wales Borderers, which formed part of the 115th Brigade in the 38th (Welsh) Division, serving from 1915 to 1919. He retained an honorary commission as chaplain to the forces, 4th class. He was Mentioned in Despatches in 1917 (Haig's despatch of 9 April), and was awarded the Military Cross in the 1918 New Year Honours.

=== Oxford ===
After the war, Havard returned to St Albans Church, Llanelli Where he was now Revd to the newly finished church 1919-1920 (he had previously served there between 1913 and 1915 while it was just the crypt) Havard was chaplain of Jesus College, Oxford, from 1919 to 1921. While there, he took a degree in modern history, graduating in 1921.

== Sports ==
=== Rugby ===
A keen sportsman, Havard played rugby at all levels, representing Brecon Secondary School while a schoolboy, and continuing through university and finally joining Llanelli and later London Welsh at club level.

On 21 April 1919, Havard played for Wales in a tour match against the New Zealand Army. This was Havard's only match for Wales; New Zealand won the match 6–3.

Havard was an Oxford blue, playing for Oxford in The Varsity Match of 1919. He was also part of the Jesus College rugby team that won the inter-collegiate cup in 1920.

=== Football ===
Havard also played football to a high standard, playing for Swansea Town. In September 1912, two days before the Swansea Town's first Southern League match, Havard was in the reserve team in a match against Merthyr and scored Swansea's first goal in their first competitive season. In January 1914, Havard had recently played football for Llanelli, prompting objections that this should debar him from playing rugby for Llanelli as an amateur: he was allowed to play one match, but not another.

== Church career ==
After leaving Oxford, Havard became curate of Brecon (1921–22), vicar of Hook (1922–24), vicar of St Luke's, Battersea (1924–28) and vicar of St Mary's, Swansea (1928–34). He was a canon of Brecon Cathedral from 1930 to 1934. He succeeded A. G. Edwards as Bishop of St Asaph in September 1934 when Edwards retired. He had in 1923 he returned to a more active army role, joining the Territorials in his previous grade on 8 May 1923, he was then promoted to Chaplain, 3rd class on 21 February 1925 before being appointed to a reserve commission on 6 January 1934, which he retained until reaching the age-limit for the position in 1949, when he was again granted an honorary commission. On 18 June 1940, he was appointed a Chaplain and Sub-Prelate of the Venerable Order of Saint John. He was translated to St David's in succession to David Prosser in 1950.

He was regarded as a powerful preacher in both Welsh and in English, with his sermon on the Sunday before the National Eisteddfod often being broadcast. He was Select Preacher at St. Andrew's University (1943) and Canterbury (1946), and travelled to Yale University in 1951 as a special lecturer and preacher. He was prominent in educational activities, chairing the education council of the Church in Wales, and acting as Visitor to St David's College, Llandovery College, Trinity College, Carmarthen and St John's College, Ystrad Meurig.

Havard died on 17 August 1956, and was buried in Brecon. His memorial is in the Havard Chapel of Brecon Cathedral.

Church in Wales titles
Preceded by A. G. Edwards	Bishop of St Asaph; 1934–1950	Succeeded by David Bartlett
Preceded by David Prosser	Bishop of St David's; 1950–1956	Succeeded by John Richards
