= Hughe Hughes =

Welsh priest

Hugh(e) Hughes (1709–1753) was Dean of Bangor from 1750 to 1753.

Hughes was born in Llanrwst and educated at Trinity College, Cambridge. He was Precentor of Bangor Cathedral from 1748 his appointment to the deanery.

Church in Wales titles
Preceded by Peter Maurice	Dean of Bangor; 1750–1753	Succeeded by Thomas Lloyd
