= Kathy Jones =

Welsh priest

The Very Reverend Kathy Jones
- Dean of Bangor
- Church: Church in Wales
- Diocese: Diocese of Bangor
- In office: January 2016 to June 2021
- Other post: Hospital chaplain (1994–1999; 2006–2016; 2021 to date)

Orders
- Ordination: 1992 (deacon); 1997 (priest)

Personal details
- Born: Kathy Louise Sandells-Rees; 1968 (age 57–58) Corris, Merionethshire, Wales
- Education: Cardiff University; Queen's College, Birmingham; University of Wales, Bangor; Northumbria University; University of Leeds

Kathy Louise Jones (née Sandells-Rees; born 1968) is a Welsh Anglican priest and chaplain. From 2016 to 2021, she served as Dean of Bangor.

== Early life and education ==
Jones was born Kathy Louise Sandells-Rees in 1968 in Corris, Merionethshire, Wales. As a child she would attend Holy Trinity Church, Lower Corris, with her mother; it was while there that she first felt the call to ordination. After failing her A Levels, she studied for a Business and Secretarial Diploma in Aberystwyth.

Having completed her diploma, Jones attended and passed a selection for those seeking ordination in the Church in Wales. She then studied theology at Cardiff University. In 1990, she entered Queen's College, Birmingham, an ecumenical theological college, to train for ordained ministry. She could not train at St Michael's College, Llandaff, the Anglican theological college in Wales, because it did not have accommodation for women until later years.

Following ordination, Jones continued with her university studies. She studied theology at the University of Wales, Bangor, graduating with a Bachelor of Theology (BTh) degree in 1996. She studied at Northumbria University and completed a Postgraduate Certificate in Education (PGCE) in 2011. She studied at the University of Leeds, graduating with a Master of Arts (MA) degree in 2013.

== Ordained ministry ==
In 1992, Jones was ordained in the Church in Wales as a deacon during a service in Bangor Cathedral. From 1992 to 1994, she served her curacy in the Rectorial Benefice of Holyhead, Anglesey, in the Diocese of Bangor. She then moved to Bangor, Gwynedd, and, from 1994 to 1999, worked as a chaplain of Ysbyty Gwynedd (English: Gwynedd Hospital). In addition, she was a curate of the Benefice of Bangor between 1994 and 1995, and Priest-in-Charge of St. Peter's Church in the Benefice between 1995 and 1999. She was ordained as a priest in 1997.

In 1999, Jones became Vicar of the Parish of Betws y Coed, Dolwyddelan, Penmachno and Capel Curig. The parish includes St Gwyddelan's Church, Dolwyddelan, St Mary's Church, Betws-y-Coed, and St Tudclud's Church, Penmachno. She had originally believed that she would only stay in the appointment for two years and then return to chaplaincy. However, she actually spent the next seven years in parish ministry. She then served as Lead Chaplain of the Northumbria Healthcare NHS Foundation Trust in the Diocese of Newcastle, Church of England.

On 19 September 2015, Jones was announced as the next dean of Bangor. On 30 January 2016, she was installed as Dean in a service in Bangor Cathedral.

It was announced on 2 May 2021 that Jones would be leaving her role as dean to become a family support leader at a hospice in Staffordshire.

Church in Wales titles
Preceded by Sue Jones	Dean of Bangor; 2016–2021	Succeeded by Manon Ceridwen James
