= William Pollard (priest) =

Dean of Bangor, Wales in 1410

William Pollard was appointed Dean of Bangor in June 1410, but exchanged it for the rectory of Newchurch, Kent a month later.

Church in Wales titles
Preceded by David Daron	Dean of Bangor; June1410–July1410	Succeeded by Henry Honore
