= William Lloyd (bishop of Worcester) =

17th/18th-century English bishop

The Right Reverend William Lloyd
- Bishop of St Asaph, Lichfield and Coventry and Worcester
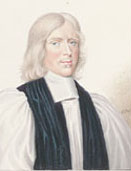
- Installed: 1689

Orders
- Consecration: 3 October 1680 by William Sancroft

Personal details
- Born: 18 August 1627 Tilehurst, Berkshire
- Died: 30 August 1717 (aged 90) Hartlebury Castle, Worcestershire
- Buried: church of Fladbury, near Evesham, Worcestershire
- Denomination: Church of England
- Parents: father Richard Lloyd, grandfather David Lloyd of Henblas, Anglesey.
- Children: at least one son
- Education: Oriel and Jesus Colleges, Oxford

William Lloyd (18 August 1627 – 30 August 1717) was an English divine who served successively as bishop of St Asaph, of Lichfield and Coventry and of Worcester.

== Life ==
Lloyd was born at Tilehurst in Berkshire, in 1627, the son of Richard Lloyd, then vicar, who was the son of David Lloyd of Henblas, Anglesey. By the age of eleven, he had understanding in Greek and Latin, and somewhat of Hebrew, before attending Oriel and Jesus Colleges, Oxford (later becoming a Fellow of Jesus College). He graduated with an M.A. in 1646. In 1663 he was prebendary of Ripon, in 1667 prebendary of Salisbury, in 1668 archdeacon of Merioneth, in 1672 dean of Bangor and prebendary of St Paul's, London, in 1680 bishop of St Asaph, in 1689 lord-almoner, in 1692 bishop of Lichfield and Coventry, and in 1699 bishop of Worcester. As Bishop of Lichfield, he rebuilt the diocesan residence at Eccleshall Castle, which had been destroyed in the Civil War.

Lloyd was an indefatigable opponent of the Roman Catholic tendencies of James II of England, and was one of the seven bishops who, for refusing to have the Declaration of Indulgence read in his diocese, was charged with publishing a seditious libel against the king. However, he was acquitted in 1688, which was one of the events that lead to the fall of James II.

He engaged Gilbert Burnet to write The History of the Reformation of the Church of England and provided him with much material. He was a good scholar and a keen student of biblical apocalyptic literature and himself "prophesied" to Anne, Queen of Great Britain, Robert Harley, 1st Earl of Oxford and Mortimer, William Whiston, and John Evelyn the diarist. Lloyd was a staunch supporter of the Glorious Revolution.

He lived to the age of ninety-one and died at Hartlebury Castle on 30 August 1717. He was buried in the church of Fladbury, near Evesham in Worcestershire, of which his son was rector and where a monument is erected to his memory with a long inscription.

== Newer perspectives ==
In a 2024 article published in The Welsh History Review historian Prof. William Gibson states that William Lloyd's role needs to be re-evaluated from that of a "mainstream Anglican bishop who sought unanimity with other churchmen in response to James II’s policies" to that of an active conspirator against the King. Gibson believes this to be the case due to several actions Lloyd took during the events leading up to the Glorious Revolution. He notes that these actions include:

- Secret Communication with William of Orange: Lloyd maintained contact with William of Orange even before James II took the throne. He was aware of William's invasion plans and was in contact with his supporters.
- Provoking James II: Lloyd deliberately provoked James II in order to push him to more extreme actions. This included challenging the king's dispensing power during the petition of the Seven Bishops and leaking the petition to the public.
- Spreading Rumours about James's Son: Lloyd actively participated in spreading rumors that James's son was illegitimate (the "bedpan baby" rumor).
- Mobilizing Opposition: Lloyd used his position to undermine James II by informing both Quakers and Presbyterian leaders in North Wales about William of Orange's planned invasion to prevent them from supporting James II. He also encouraged defiance in his diocese.
- Advocating for the Abdication of James II: Lloyd was a strong proponent of the idea that James II had effectively abdicated the throne by fleeing the country. He also discouraged any consideration of a compromise that would allow James II to return with limited powers.

== Works ==
- His chief publication was An Historical Account of Church Government as it was in Great Britain and Ireland when they first received the Christian Religion (London, 1684, reprinted Oxford, 1842).
- He added a revised version of Ussher's chronology to a 1701 edition of the 1611 Authorised Version of the Bible, published in folio, under the direction of archbishop Tenison.

Church of England titles
Preceded by Griffith Williams	Dean of Bangor; 1673–1680	Succeeded by Humphrey Humphreys
Preceded by Isaac Barrow	Bishop of St Asaph; 1680–1692	Succeeded by Edward Jones
Preceded by Thomas Wood	Bishop of Lichfield and Coventry; 1692–1699	Succeeded by John Hough
Preceded by Edward Stillingfleet	Bishop of Worcester; 1699–1717	Succeeded by John Hough
