= John Jones (dean of Bangor) =

Dean of Bangor, Wales from 1727 to 1750

John Jones, D.D. was Dean of Bangor from 1727 until 1750.

Jones was born in Anglesey and educated at Trinity College, Cambridge. He held a living at Abergwyngregyn and a prebendary of St Asaph.

Church in Wales titles
| Preceded by Humphrey Humphreys | Dean of Bangor; 1727–1750 | Succeeded by Peter Maurice |
