= John Jones (bishop) =

British bishop (1904–1956)

John Charles Jones (3 May 1904 – 13 October 1956) was the Anglican Bishop of Bangor from 1949 until his death.

Jones was educated at the Grammar School, Carmarthen, Cardiff University and Wadham College, Oxford. He held curacies at Llanelli and Aberystwyth before an 11 years in Uganda as a Church Mission Society (CMS) missionary. He returned to Llanelli as its vicar in 1945, his last post before his ordination to the episcopate.

Church in Wales titles
Preceded by David Edwardes Davies	Bishop of Bangor; 1949–1956	Succeeded by Gwilym Williams
