= Sue Jones (priest) =

Welsh Anglican priest (born 1960)

The Very Reverend Dr Sue Jones
- Dean of Liverpool
- Church: Church of England
- Diocese: Diocese of Liverpool
- In office: May 2018 to present
- Predecessor: Pete Wilcox
- Other posts: Director of Mission and Ministry, Diocese of Derby (2015 to 2018); Dean of Bangor (2011 to 2015)

Orders
- Ordination: 24 June 1995 (deacon); 12 January 1997 (priest)

Personal details
- Born: Susan Helen Jones; 29 October 1960 (age 65) Barry, Glamorgan, Wales
- Denomination: Anglicanism
- Education: Trinity College, Carmarthen; Ripon College Cuddesdon; University of Wales, Bangor

Susan Helen Jones (born 29 October 1960) is a Welsh Anglican priest. Since May 2018, she has been Dean of Liverpool in the Church of England. She was Dean of Bangor from 2011 to May 2015 and Director of Mission and Ministry in the Diocese of Derby from May 2015 to 2018.

== Early life and education ==
Jones was born on 29 October 1960 in Barry, Vale of Glamorgan, Wales. She studied at Trinity College Carmarthen, graduating with a Bachelor of Education (BEd) degree in 1992 and a Master of Philosophy (MPhil) degree in 1994. From 1993 to 1995, she trained for Holy Orders at Ripon College Cuddesdon, an Anglican theological college near Oxford, England. She later undertook postgraduate studies at the University of Wales, Bangor, and completed her Doctor of Philosophy (PhD) degree in 2002. Her doctoral thesis was titled "The personality profile of Anglican clergy 1992-1996".

== Ordained ministry ==
Jones was ordained in the Church in Wales as a deacon on 24 June 1995 and priest on 12 January 1997. Before her appointment as dean, she was a chaplain at Swansea University and director of studies at St. Michael's College, Llandaff. In September 2011, she became first woman to be appointed a dean in the Church in Wales when she was made Dean of Bangor, and was therefore its most senior female cleric.

On 9 May 2015, Jones was appointed Director of Mission and Ministry in the Diocese of Derby in the Church of England. She was also appointed a Canon Residentiary of Derby Cathedral in 2015. From November 2016 to September 2017, she also served as acting Dean of Derby.

In January 2018, it was announced that she had been appointed as the eighth Dean of Liverpool, the head of the chapter of Liverpool Cathedral and the senior priest of the Diocese of Liverpool. She was installed as dean on 5 May 2018.

Church in Wales titles
| Preceded by Alun Hawkins | Dean of Bangor; 2011 to 2015 | Succeeded by Kathy Jones |
Church of England titles
| Preceded by Pete Wilcox | Dean of Liverpool; 2018 to present | Incumbent |
