= John Warren (priest) =

Dean of Bangor, Wales (1767–1838)

John Warren (1767–1838) was Dean of Bangor from 1793 to 1838.

Warren was educated at Jesus College, Cambridge. A prebendary of Lichfield, he died on 16 February 1838.

Church in Wales titles
| Preceded by Thomas Lloyd | Dean of Bangor; 1793–1838 | Succeeded by James Cotton |
