= Thomas Lloyd (priest, born 1709) =

Dean of Bangor, Wales (1709–1793)

Thomas Lloyd (1709–1793) was Dean of Bangor from 1753 to 1793.

Lloyd was born in Dolgellau and educated at Ruthin School and Trinity College, Cambridge. He was Precentor of Bangor Cathedral from 1744 to 1748; and its Treasurer from then until his appointment to the deanery. He died at Bangor in 1793.

Church in Wales titles
Preceded by Hughe Hughes	Dean of Bangor; 1753–1793	Succeeded by John Warren
