= David Bartlett (bishop) =

British Anglican bishop

David Daniel Bartlett (5 November 1900 – 10 April 1977) was Bishop of St Asaph from 1950 until 1971.

Born in Carmarthen on 5 November 1900, he was educated at Queen Elizabeth Boys Grammar School, St David's College, Lampeter and then St John's College, Cambridge. He was ordained deacon in 1923 and priest in 1924. Also in 1923 he went back to St David's College as a Lecturer in Theology; after this he was Vicar of Pembroke Dock from 1931 to 1946. He was then Professor of Hebrew and Theology at St David's College Lampeter from 1946 to 1950. He was consecrated Bishop of St Asaph in Brecon Cathedral on 21 September 1950. In this role, he was often the bishop who represented Wales on central council of the Church of England. He died on 10 April 1977.

Church in Wales titles
Preceded by William Havard	Bishop of St Asaph; 1950–1971	Succeeded by Harold Charles
