= Islwyn Davies (priest) =

British priest (1909–1981)

Hywel Islwyn Davies (called Islwyn; 14 February 1909 – 19 February 1981) was a British Anglican priest.

== Biography ==
Born on 14 February 1909 and educated at Gowerton Grammar School and Gonville and Caius College, Cambridge, he was ordained in 1936. After a curacy in Merthyr Tydfil he was a Lecturer at St David’s College, Lampeter. In 1953, he contributed an historical article to Cyngres yr Eglwys yng Nghymru 1953 - Congress of the Church in Wales. He held incumbencies at Llanstephan, Llanbadarn Fawr and then Llanelli before being appointed Dean of Bangor in 1957. In 1961, he joined the staff of the University of Ife and was Professor of Philosophy of Religion there from 1966 to 1969. He was Rector of Collyweston from 1969 to 1976. He died on 19 February 1981.

Church in Wales titles
Preceded by John Richards	Dean of Bangor; 1957–1961	Succeeded by Gwynfryn Richards
