= Philip Bisse =

British bishop (1667–1721)

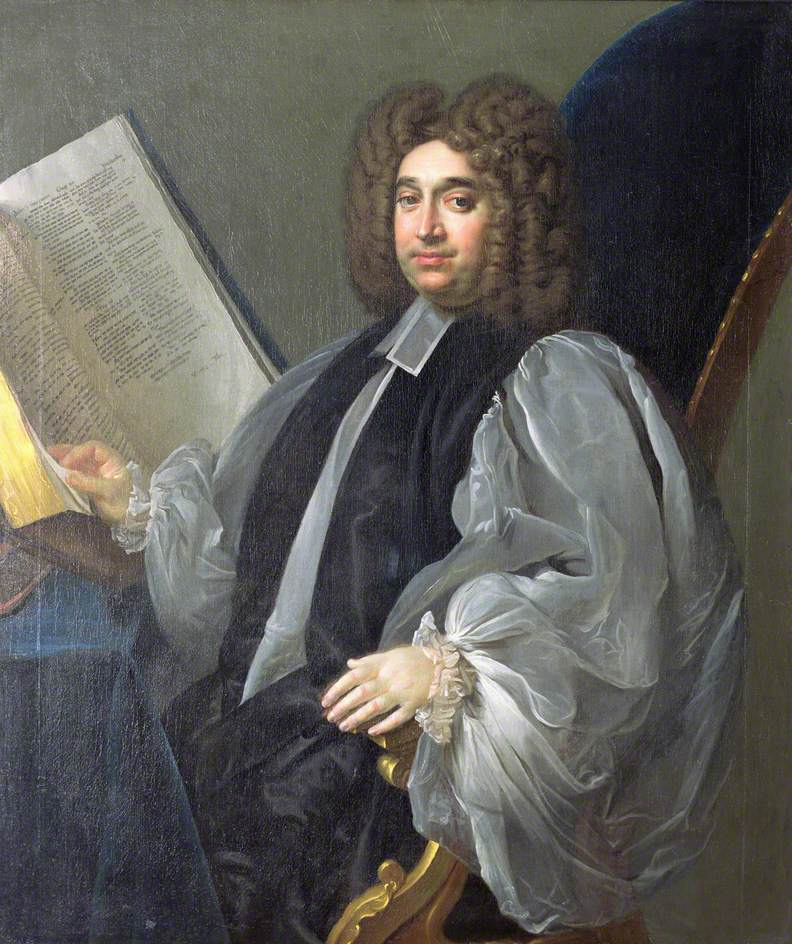
Bishop Bisse

Philip Bisse (1667 – 6 September 1721) was an English bishop.

== Life ==
He was born in Oldbury-on-the-Hill, Gloucestershire, the son of John Bisse, a clerk and educated at Winchester College and New College, Oxford, ordained in 1686 and graduating M.A. in 1693. He was elected a Fellow of the Royal Society in March, 1706.

He was Bishop of St David's from 1710 to 1713. In 1713 he became the Bishop of Hereford, a post he held until his death in 1721. He was on the Commission for Building Fifty New Churches.

In 1705, he married Lady Bridget Osborne, widow of Charles FitzCharles, 1st Earl of Plymouth and daughter of Sir Thomas Osborne, 1st Duke of Leeds and Bridget Bertie.

== Family ==
His brother, the Rev. Dr. Thomas Bisse, was the Chancellor of Hereford Cathedral and in 1724 organised a "Music Meeting" which subsequently became the Three Choirs Festival.

Thomas, like his brother was son of John Bisse, of Oldbury-on-Severn, co. Gloucester. He matriculated at New College on 30 Sept 1691, aged 16; was a fellow of Corpus Christi College, Oxford, was awarded BA in 1695, MA on 2 Mar 1698–9, BD in 1708, and DD on 27 Jan 1712–13. He was a preacher at the Rolls Chapel, London, 1715. Prebend of Hereford 1713, chancellor of Hereford (cathedral) 1716. He was rector of Cradley and a portion of Ledbury 1713, and of Weston-under-Penyard in Herefordshire 1716. He died on 22 April 1731, aged 56.

A descendant and last of the line was Thomas Chaloner Bisse (1788–1872).

== Notes ==
Church of England titles
Preceded by George Bull	Bishop of St David's; 1710–1713	Succeeded by Adam Ottley
Preceded by Humphrey Humphreys	Bishop of Hereford; 1713–1721	Succeeded by Benjamin Hoadley
