= David Edwardes Davies =

David Edwardes Davies (30 May 1879 – 15 May 1950) was an Anglican bishop who served as Bishop of Bangor from 1944 to 1949.

Edwardes Davies was educated at Durham University on a theological scholarship and was ordained in 1905. He began his ordained ministry with curacies at Oswestry and Wrexham, and subsequently held incumbencies at Brymbo, Mold, Rhyl and Swansea before his consecration as a bishop. He served as Bishop of Bangor until 1949 and died on 15 May 1950.

Church in Wales titles
Preceded by Charles Green	Bishop of Bangor; 1944–1949	Succeeded by John Charles Jones
