= Rhys Powell =

Dean of Bangor, Wales from 1554 to 1557

Rhys Powell was Dean of Bangor from 1554 until 1557.
