= Rupert Davies (politician) =

Canadian politician

William Rupert Davies (12 September 1879 – 11 March 1967) was a Welsh-Canadian author, editor, newspaper publisher, and politician.

Davies was born in Welshpool, Montgomeryshire, Wales and immigrated to Canada in the late 1800s after his family's tailor business failed. He later married Florence Sheppard McKay, of Loyalist stock. The Davies moved to Thamesville, then to Renfrew, Ontario and later to Kingston, Ontario.

Following a successful career as publisher of the Kingston Whig-Standard, Davies was appointed to the Senate on 19 November 1942 on the recommendation of William Lyon Mackenzie King. Sitting as a Liberal, he represented the senatorial division of Kingston, Ontario, a position he held until his death.

In 1932, Davies renewed his connection with Montgomeryshire and purchased Fronfraith Hall, in Llandyssil. He continued to own Fronfraith until 1948, when he moved to Brookland Hall. In 1950 he moved from Brooklands to Leighton Hall, to the east of Welshpool, which he continued to own until his death in 1967. In 1951 he was appointed Sheriff of Montgomeryshire.

Davies was the father of author Robertson Davies, Arthur Davies and Fred Davies. He died in Toronto in 1967 while in office as senator.
