= Peter Maurice (Dean of Bangor) =

Welsh priest

Peter Maurice, D.D. was a Chaplain to the King; and Dean of Bangor from 1727 until 1750.

Maurice was born in Cerrigydrudion and educated at Jesus College, Oxford. He was Vicar of Llanynys from 1718; and Treasurer of Bangor Cathedral from 1720 his appointment to the deanery. in 1740 he was appointed a Canon of Winchester.

He died in August 1759.

Church in Wales titles
Preceded by John Jones	Dean of Bangor; 1727–1750	Succeeded by Hughe Hughes
