= Ringsted (disambiguation) =

Ringsted may refer to:

- Ringsted, a city in Denmark
- Ringsted municipality, a municipality containing the city of Ringsted, Denmark
- Ringsted-Hallen, an indoor sports arena in the city of Ringsted, Denmark
- Ringsted, Iowa, a city in the United States

== See also ==
- Ringstead (disambiguation)
