= Edmund Griffith =

Welsh bishop

Edmund Griffith (1570–1637) was a Welsh bishop of Bangor.

== Life ==
Griffith was born in Lleyn, the promontory of Carnarvonshire, the fourth son of Gruffydd ab Sion Gruffydd of Cevnamlwch. His mother was Catrin, the daughter of Sir Richard Bulkeley of Baron Hill, Anglesey.

Griffith was admitted as an exhibitioner of Brasenose College, Oxford, on 8 April 1587, having been before, in Anthony Wood's opinion, of Jesus College. He proceeded M.A. in 1592. In 1599 he became rector of Llandwrog, in 1600 canon of Bangor, and in 1604 rector of Llanbedrog, both being in the diocese of Bangor. On 10 March 1605 he was instituted archdeacon of Bangor and then on 9 September 1613 dean of Bangor. On the death of Bishop David Dolben he was elected bishop of Bangor on 31 December 1633, confirmed on 12 February 1634, consecrated on 16 February 1634 at Lambeth by Archbishop William Laud, and enthroned on 14 April 1634. He died on 26 May 1637, and was buried in the choir of his cathedral.
