= Robert Evans (Master of Magdalene) =

Welsh priest and academic (died 1570)

Robert Evans was a 16th century Welsh priest and academic.

Evans was educated at both Oxford and Cambridge universities; and was the first Master of Magdalene College, Cambridge from 1544 until 1546. He held livings at Llantrisant (Anglesey), Llanengan, Terrington St John and Llanllechid; and was Dean of Bangor from 1534 until 1554, and again from 1557 until his death in 1570.
