= Thomas de Ringstead =

English Dominican and bishop

Thomas de Ringstead (died 1366) was an English Dominican who became Bishop of Bangor.

== Life ==
Ringstead was educated at Cambridge, where he also taught theology. He became a Dominican, studied in France and Italy, and was appointed penitentiary to Pope Innocent VI, who, on 21 August 1357, provided him to the see of Bangor. He died in the Dominican monastery at Shrewsbury on 8 January 1366.
