= David John James =

Welsh businessman and philanthropist (1887–1967)

Sir David John James (13 May 1887 – 7 March 1967), also known as D. J. James was a Welsh businessman and philanthropist, remembered as the founder of the James Pantyfedwen Trust, which continues to support cultural events in Wales.

He was born in London, a son of Cathryn (née Thomas) and John James, but his family was originally from Ceredigion and returned to their original home of Pantyfedwen, Pontrhydfendigaid, Cardiganshire, when David and his brother, Rhys Thomas James, were young. He attended St. John's College, Ystrad Meurig, with a view to training as a minister, but left after a year. Returning to London, he took over the family dairy, and married Grace Lily Stevens on 24 April 1924. In addition to the dairy business, he was involved in the wheat trade, and also ran a chain of cinemas in London until 1930.

In 1952 he founded the Pantyfedwen Trust, which, though managed from London, was established to promote religious, educational and charitable causes in Wales. It later merged with other charities set up in the names of family members to create the James Pantyfedwen Trust in 1998. The Trust ran its own local eisteddfodau at Pontrhydfendigaid and Lampeter, in order to offer more opportunities for people to compete at an intermediate level. The headquarters of the trust moved to Aberystwyth in 1968. In recognition of his contributions to public life, he was awarded an honorary LL.D degree from the University of Wales (1957) and the Freedom of the Borough of Aberystwyth (1964). He received a knighthood in the 1959 Birthday Honours.

He was buried at Strata Florida, along with his wife.
