= Henry Honore =

Dean of Bangor, Wales from 1410 to 1413

Henry Honore was the Dean of Bangor from 1410 until 1413. (Note: listed as Henry Henore in Jones 1965.) Honore had been the vicar at Bocton Monchesey before 1406 when he exchanged this to become the vicar at Newchurch, Kent. In June 1410 he exchanged his position with William Pollard for the deanery of Bangor.
