= Robert Price (bishop) =

Irish Anglican bishop

Robert Price (died 1666) was an Anglican bishop in Ireland. He was Dean of Connor from 1640 to 1660, and became Bishop of Ferns and Leighlin in 1661. He was nominated Bishop of Bangor in 1665, but died before he was consecrated.

Price studied at Christ Church, Oxford, and later received a Doctor of Laws from Trinity College Dublin. He served for a time as chaplain to Thomas Wentworth, 1st Earl of Strafford.
