= Henry James (dean of Bangor) =

Welsh theologian (1864–1949)

Henry Lewis James (18 March 1864 – 17 January 1949) was Dean of Bangor from 1934 to 1940 and an author of theological works in Welsh.

== Life ==
James was born on 18 March 1864 and educated at Ystrad Meurig School, Christ College, Brecon and Jesus College, Oxford where he obtained a second-class degree in Literae Humaniores. He was ordained in 1887 and served as a curate in Llandudno, later becoming warden of Bangor Church Hostel and, in 1901, rector of Llangefni. He was rector of Tredington, Worcestershire (1907–1910) before becoming rector of Aberffraw and, between 1926 and 1930, rector of Dolgellau. Having been made an honorary canon of Bangor Cathedral in 1928, he was appointed prebendary of Penmynydd in 1930, Chancellor of the Cathedral in 1933 and Dean in 1934. He published a number of theological works in Welsh. He died on 17 January 1949 at his home in Bangor at the age of 84.

== Personal ==
He married Ada Isabella Williams in 1901. The marriage produced four recorded children. His elder son, Arthur Dyfrig James, became headmaster of his father's alma mater, Christ College, Brecon in 1931. The younger of his two sons was Robert Leoline James, who in 1953 became headmaster of Harrow School.
