= Thomas Skevington =

English Cistercian monk

Thomas Skevington (also Skeffington, Pace or Patexe) (died 17 August 1533) was an English Cistercian monk, abbot of Waverley Abbey and Beaulieu Abbey, and bishop of Bangor from 1509.

== Life ==
The son of John Pace of Leicestershire and his wife Margaret Cobley, daughter of William Cobley, he is said to have been born at Skeffington, the seat of the family of that name.

Pace entered the Cistercian Merivale Abbey in Warwickshire, and studied at the Cistercian St Bernard's College, Oxford. As was customary, he took a new name on entering the regular life, and selected what is supposed to have been his birthplace.

Skevington became abbot of Waverley in Surrey in 1477, and then Beaulieu in Hampshire in 1508, according to scholarly identifications of their "Abbot Thomas". On 17 June 1509 he was consecrated bishop of Bangor; he retained Beaulieu in commendam, for the rest of his life.

At Bangor, Skevington had William Glynne (died 1537) as vicar-general, and was active as a builder. He finished the episcopal palace and built the tower and the nave of Bangor Cathedral. His body was buried at Beaulieu, but his heart was taken to Bangor.
