= Henry Rowlands (bishop) =

Welsh bishop

- Born: 1551; Meyllteyrn or Botwnnog, Carnarvonshire
- Died: 6 July 1616 (aged 64–65)
- Education: Penllech school New College Jesus College, Oxford
- Known for: bishop of Bangor
- Parents: Rolant ap Robert (father); Elizabeth (mother)

Henry Rowlands (1551–1616) was a Welsh bishop of Bangor.

== Life ==
He was born in the parish of Meyllteyrn or Botwnnog, Carnarvonshire, son of Rolant ap Robert of Meyllteyrn and of Elizabeth, daughter of Griffith ap Robert Vaughan. After being educated at Penllech school, he studied at Oxford, and graduated B.A. from New College on 17 February 1574. He then migrated to St. Mary Hall, and graduated M.A. 27 June 1577, B.D. 27 March 1591, D.D. 28 June 1605. He took holy orders on 14 September 1572, and was Rector of Meyllteyrn from 1572 to 1581, and of Launton, from 1581 to 1600.

From 4 August 1584 to August 1594 he was prebendary of Penmynydd, Bangor Cathedral, from 3 September 1588 rector of Aberdaron, becoming in the same year archdeacon of Anglesey, and on 29 August 1593 dean of Bangor. On 16 September 1598 he was elected bishop of Bangor, and installed on 19 January 1599. He subsequently became rector of Trefdraeth, Anglesey, in 1601, vicar of Llanrhaiadr-in-Kimmerch 1602, a member of Gray's Inn 1606, and rector of Llanrhaiadr, Denbigh, 1612. He died on 6 July 1616, and was buried in the cathedral in the choir, before the high altar. He was careful of the revenues of his cathedral, and gave to it four bells, to replace those sold by his predecessor. He also in 1609 gave lands to Jesus College, Oxford, for the maintenance of two scholars or fellows, and in his will he left lands for the erection of a school at Meyllteyrn. Rowlands married, at Langton, Frances Hutchins or Pope of Oxford, widow of one Cotesford. He also established the Almshouses on the south side of the Cathedral, which were supported by three farms in the village of Llansadwrn, Anglesey.
