= David Daron =

Dean of Bangor, Wales from 1397 to 1410

David (Dafydd) Daron was the Dean of Bangor (1397 - 1410). His father was Evan ap David ap Griffith, a descendant of Caradoc ap Iestyn.

Daron appears as the Archdeacon of Bangor in William Shakespeare's works on Henry IV. The meeting between Owain Glyndŵr, Hotspur, Worcester and Mortimer regarding the Tripartite Indenture took place in his home.
