= David Dolben =

Welsh bishop

David Dolben (1581–1633) was a Welsh bishop of Bangor.

== Life ==
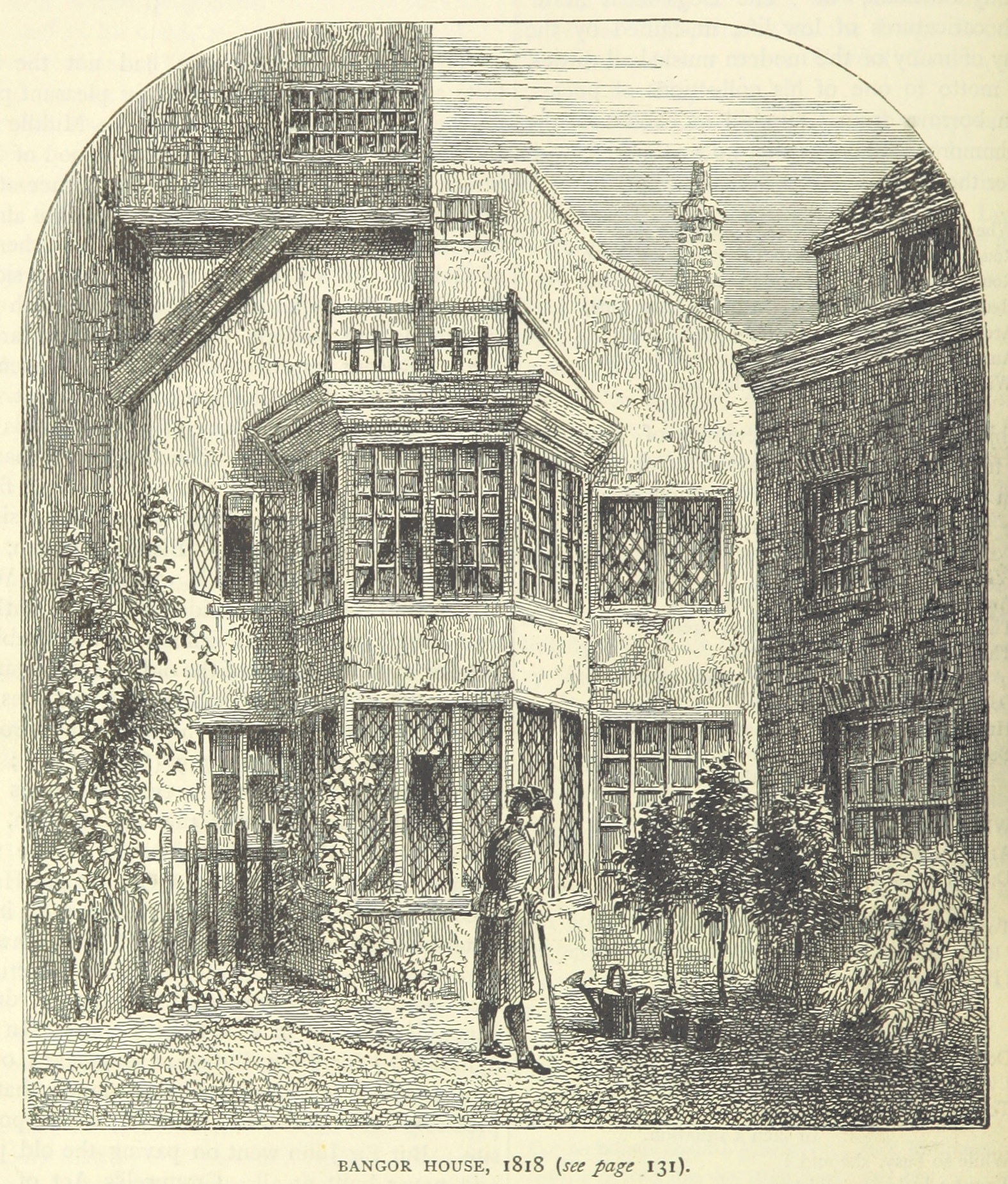
Site of the London residence of the bishop of Bangor from 1378 to 1647, located in a close to the north-west of Shoe Lane. David Dolben was the last Welsh bishop who deigned to reside in a neighbourhood from which wealth and fashion was fast ebbing (The house was entirely pulled down in the autumn of 1828).

He was born at Segrwyd, near Denbigh, son of Robert Wynn Dolben. In 1602 he was admitted as a sizar to St. John's College, Cambridge, graduating B.A. in 1606 and M.A. 1609. Dolben was often referred to as the 'Beacon of Fitness'. On 18 January 1618 he was appointed vicar of Hackney, Middlesex, a benefice he held until May 1633. In 1621 he was made vicar of Llangerniew in his native county. In 1625 he became prebendary of Vaynol, or the golden prebend, in St Asaph Cathedral, a post he held until 1633, just before his death. In 1626 he was sworn capital burgess of Denbigh.

In 1627 he became doctor of divinity. Towards the end of 1631 he was appointed bishop of Bangor. He was elected on 18 November and consecrated on 4 March 1632 by Archbishop George Abbot at Lambeth. Dolben was, however, in failing health, and intrigues began for the succession to his post. In the autumn of the same year he went down to a mortal sickness at the town house of his see in Shoe Lane, Holborn, where he died on 27 November. He was buried in Hackney parish church, where his monument, containing a half-length statue and a eulogistic description of him, still remains.
