= Humphrey Lloyd (bishop) =

Welsh bishop

Humphrey Lloyd (July or August 1610 – 18 January 1689) was Bishop of Bangor from 1674 until 1689.

== Life ==
Lloyd was the third son of the vicar of Ruabon, Denbighshire, Wales, and was born in Trawsfynydd, Merioneth, Wales. He studied at the University of Oxford, matriculating from Jesus College in 1628 but graduating from Oriel College in 1630, becoming a fellow of Oriel, where he was a tutor for many years, in 1631. During the English Civil War, he was arrested in September 1642 for uttering Royalist views when the Parliamentarian Lord Lieutenant of Oxfordshire visited Oxford. In 1644, he was appointed prebend of Ampleforth by John Williams, the Archbishop of York, to whom Lloyd was chaplain, but the advance of the Scottish army prevented his installation at that time. Three years later, in 1647, the House of Lords ordered that he be installed as vicar of Ruabon on taking the National League and Covenant, but he would appear not to have stayed in post for long, if indeed he was installed at this time. However, following the Restoration, Lloyd returned to Ruabon and was also installed as prebend of Ampleforth. He was awarded his DD degree in 1661, when he also became vicar of Northop. He was appointed as Dean of St Asaph in 1663, resigning as vicar of Northop in 1664.

In 1673, Lloyd was appointed Bishop of Bangor; in addition, he was permitted to be archdeacon of Bangor and of Anglesey, prebend of Ampleforth and vicar of Gresford (where he had recently succeeded his brother after leaving Ruabon). He was enthroned on 5 January 1674, by proxy. As bishop, he was hostile to dissent and to presbyterian missionaries. He died on 18 January 1689, and was buried in Bangor Cathedral.
