= John Thomas Davies (priest) =

British Anglican priest (1881–1966)

John Thomas Davies (1881–1966) was an Anglican priest. Born on 27 January 1881 and educated at Jesus College, Oxford, he was ordained in 1905. After curacies in Talgarth and Aberystwyth he was a Minor Canon at St Davids Cathedral. He then held incumbencies at Llanelli and Carmarthen before appointed Dean of Bangor in 1941. He retired in 1955; and died on 16 February 1966.
