= Nicholas Robinson (bishop) =

Welsh bishop

Nicholas Robinson (died 1585) was a Welsh Bishop of Bangor and correspondent of Lord William Cecil, Sir Francis Walsingham, and Robert Dudley, 1st Earl of Leicester. He was also a dean and vice-president of a college at Queens' College, Cambridge.

== Life ==
Born at Conwy in North Wales, he was the second son of John Robinson, by his wife Ellin, daughter of William Brickdale. He was educated at Queens' College, Cambridge, where he matriculated in 1545 as a sizar, proceeded B.A. in 1548, and was a fellow from 1548 to 1563. In 1551 he commenced M.A., was bursar of his own college in 1551–3, and a proctor in the university for 1552, dean of his college 1577–8, and vice-president of his college in 1561. Plays written by him were acted at Queens' College in 1550, 1552, and 1553, the last being a comedy entitled Strylius. In 1555 he subscribed the Roman Catholic articles. He was ordained at Bangor by William Glynn, first as acolyte and sub-dean on 12 March 1557, then deacon on the 13th, and priest on the 14th, under a special faculty from Cardinal Pole.

On 20 December 1559 Matthew Parker licensed him to preach throughout his province, and he was then, or about that time, appointed one of his chaplains. He proceeded at Cambridge B.D. in 1560 and D.D. in 1566. A sermon preached by him at St. Paul's Cross in December 1561 was commended by Edmund Grindal. After this preferment came quickly. He was appointed on 13 December 1561 to the rectory of Shepperton in Middlesex; on 16 June 1562 to the archdeaconry of Merioneth; and on 26 August of the same year to the sinecure rectory of Northop in Flintshire. He also became rector of Witney in Oxfordshire. By right of his archdeaconry he sat in the convocation of 1563, when he subscribed the Thirty-nine Articles, and voted against the defeated proposal which was made for modification in rites and ceremonies. In 1564 he also subscribed the bishops' propositions concerning ecclesiastical dress, and wrote Tractatus de vestium usu in sacris. He was at Cambridge during Queen Elizabeth's visit in August 1564, and prepared an account of it in Latin; a similar account was written by him of the queen's visit to Oxford in 1566. He was one of the Lent preachers before the queen in 1565.

Robinson was elected bishop of Bangor, in succession to Rowland Meyrick, after much deliberation on the part of the archbishop, under a licence attested at Cambridge on 30 July 1566. He also held in commendam the archdeaconry of Merioneth, and the rectories of Witney, Northop, and Shepperton. The archdeaconry he resigned in 1573 in favour of his kinsman, Humphrey Robinson, but he took instead the archdeaconry of Anglesey, which he held until his death. He resigned Shepperton about November 1574.

For the next few years Robinson acted against the non-Protestant customs in his diocese. On 7 October 1567 he wrote to Sir William Cecil, noticing the use of images, altars, pilgrimages, and vigils. On 23 April 1571 he was acting as one of the commissioners for ecclesiastical causes at Lambeth, and in the convocation held that year he subscribed the English translation of the Thirty-nine Articles and the book of Canons. About 1581 he was still suspected of Catholic tendencies; on 28 May 1582 he wrote two letters, one to Francis Walsingham and the other to Robert Dudley, 1st Earl of Leicester, justifying himself.

He died on 13 February 1585, and was buried on the 17th in Bangor Cathedral on the south side of the high altar. His effigy and arms were delineated in brass, but the figure had been removed at the time of Browne Willis's survey in 1720.

== Works ==
Robinson made a collection on Welsh history, which was formerly preserved in the Hengwrt Library. He sent to Archbishop Parker a copy of part of Eadmer's history. He translated into Latin a life of Gruffydd ab Cynan from an old Welsh text at Gwydyr; the text and translation were edited by the Rev. Robert Williams for the Archaeologia Cambrensis for 1866. William Morgan, in the dedication of his Welsh version of the bible (published in 1588), acknowledges assistance from a bishop of Bangor, presumed to be Robinson.

== Family ==
Robinson married Jane, daughter of Randal Brereton, by Mary, daughter of Sir William Griffith of Penrhyn, chamberlain of North Wales, and by her he had numerous sons, including Hugh, and William, his eldest, whose son was John Robinson (1617–1681) the royalist.
