= Bishop of Bangor =

Welsh Anglican church role

- Bishopric

anglican
- Coat of arms
- Incumbent; Manon Ceridwen James

Location
- Ecclesiastical province: Wales

Information
- First holder: Deiniol
- Established: 6th century
- Diocese: Bangor
- Cathedral: Bangor Cathedral

The Bishop of Bangor is the ordinary of the Diocese of Bangor of the Church in Wales. The see is based in the city of Bangor where the bishop's seat (cathedra) is at Cathedral Church of Saint Deiniol.

The Report of the Commissioners appointed by his Majesty to inquire into the Ecclesiastical Revenues of England and Wales (1835) found the see had an annual net income of £4,464. This made it the second wealthiest diocese in Wales, after St Asaph.

The incumbent is Manon Ceridwen James who was consecrated on 12 September 2026 and enthroned on 19 September 2026. The bishop's residence is Ty'r Esgob ("Bishop's House") in Bangor.

== List of Bishops of Bangor ==
=== Pre-Reformation bishops ===
Pre-Reformation Bishops of Bangor
From	Until	Incumbent	Notes
unknown	unknown	Saint Deiniol	Also known as Daniel; he founded the monastery at Bangor c. 520.
unknown	c. 775	Dates and names for this period are not known.	
c. 775	c. 811	Elfodd	Also known as Elbodug, Ellodu; described as chief bishop of Venedotia, probably Bishop of Bangor. Possibly identical with Elfodd who was bishop of St David's
c. 811	c. 904	Dates and names for this period are not known.	
c. 904	c. 940	Mordaf	Possibly identical with Morfyw who was bishop of St David's
c. 940	c. 1050	Dates and names for this period are not known.	
c. 1050	unknown	Dyfan	
c. 1081	unknown	Revedun	
1092	1108	Hervey le Breton	Also known as Hervæus. Consecrated 1092; forced to flee the diocese in the late 1090s; translated to Ely in 1108.
1109	1120	See vacant	
1120	1139	David the Scot	Consecrated 4 April 1120; probably died in 1139.
1140	1161	Meurig	Maurice; elected before December 1139 and consecrated in late January 1140; died 12 August 1161.
c. 1163	1169	Arthur of Bardsey	Possibly nominated before October 1163 by Owain Gwynedd and was probably consecrated in Ireland before 1165; he was not accepted by Thomas Becket, Archbishop of Canterbury and was urged to give up the post in April or May 1169.
1177	c. 1190	Gwion	Wido or Guy Rufus; consecrated 22 May 1177; died c. 1190.
el. c. 1193/96		Rotoland	Subprior of Aberconwy; elected bishop between 1191 and 1196, but nothing further is known.
1195	1196	Alan	Alban; formerly Prior of St John of Jerusalem; consecrated 16 April 1195; died in May or December 1196.
1197	1213	Robert of Shrewsbury	Consecrated 16 March 1197; died in 1213.
1215	1236	Cadwgan of Llandyfai	Martin; elected before 13 April and consecrated 21 June 1215; resigned 1235 or 1236; died 11 April 1241.
1236		Hywel ap Ednyfed	Elected in 1236, but was not consecrated.
1236	1267	Richard	Elected before 3 July 1236 and consecrated in 1237; absent from the diocese from 1248 to c. 1258; died before 8 November 1267.
1267	1307	Anion	Anian or Enian; formerly Archdeacon of Anglesey; elected bishop before 12 December 1267; consecrated in 1267 or 1268; received possession of the temporalities 5 January 1268; died before 12 January 1307.
1307	1309	Gruffydd ap Iorwerth	Consecrated 26 March 1307; died 27 April 1309.
1309	1328	Einion Sais	Elected between 2 May and 18 June 1309; received possession of the temporalities 7 September and consecrated 9 November 1309; died 26 January 1328.
1328	1357	Matthew de Englefeld	Madog ap Iowerth; elected 26 February and consecrated 12 June 1328; died between 22 March and 15 April 1357.
1357		Ithel ap Robert	Elected bishop in 1357, but was quashed by Pope Innocent VI.
1357	1366	Thomas de Ringstead OP	Appointed 21 August and consecrated after 17 September 1357; died 8 January 1366.
1366		Alexander Dalby	Nominated by Edward of Woodstock, Prince of Wales; a papal mandate was issued 29 April 1366 to the Archbishop of Bordeaux that he should hold an inquiry and notify the pope within two months whether Dalby understood Welsh well enough to preach in the language; nothing further is heard.
1366	1370	Gervase de Castro OP	Appointed 11 December 1366; died 24 September or 30 October 1370.
1371	1372	Hywel ab Goronwy	Appointed 21 April 1371; died before 3 February 1372; the Welsh Poet, Dafydd ap Gwilym wrote a poem of praise to him when he was Dean of Bangor.
1372	1375	John Gilbert OP	Appointed 17 March and received possession of the temporalities 30 April 1372; translated to Hereford 12 September 1375.
c. 1375/76		Geoffrey Herdeby OFSA	A petition was sent to the pope for Herdeby to be appointment as bishop, however, Swaffham became bishop instead.
1376	1398	John Swaffham OCarm	Translated from Cloyne 2 July 1276 and received possession of the temporalities 28 October 1376; died 24 June 1398.
1398		Lewis Aber	Elected before 21 August 1398, but vacated soon afterwards.
1398	1404	Richard Young	Appointed 2 December 1398; received possession of the temporalities 20 May 1400; probably consecrated in Rome 1400; absent from the diocese after 1401; translated to Rochester 28 July 1404.
1405	1408	Lewis Byford	Llywelyn Biford; appointed by Pope Boniface IX; held the diocese from c. 1405 until ejected by Young's appointment in 1408.
1408	1418	Griffin Yonge	Gruffydd Young; appointed by Antipope Benedict XIII in 1408, but was declared void and was appointed to Ross by Pope Martin V on 14 February 1418.
1408	1417	Benedict Nichols	Appointed by Pope Gregory XII 18 April and consecrated 12 August 1408; translated to St David's in December 1417.
1418	1423	William Barrow	Formerly a Canon of Lincoln; appointed 14 February 1418 and consecrated after 13 October 1419; translated to Carlisle 19 April 1423.
1423	1435	John Clederowe	John Cliderow; formerly a Canon of Chichester; appointed 19 April 1423 and consecrated in 1425; died before 13 December 1435.
1436	1448	Thomas Cheriton OP	Appointed 5 March and received possession of the temporalities 21 November 1436; consecrated 25 November 1436; died 23 December 1447.
1448	1453	John Stanberry OCarm	John Stanbury; appointed 4 March and received possession of the temporalities 15 May 1448; consecrated 23 June 1448; translated to Hereford 7 February 1453.
1453	1464	James Blakedon OP	Translated from Achonry 7 February and received possession of the temporalities 25 March 1453; died before 3 October 1464.
1464	1494	Richard Edenham OFM	Richard Edenam; appointed 14 January and consecrated after 18 March 1465; died before 13 April 1494.
1494	1500	Henry Deane OCanSA	Formerly Prior of Llanthony; appointed 4 July 1494; elected 13 September 1494; consecrated 20 November 1495; appointed again 21 July 1496; received possession of the temporalities 6 October 1496; also was Lord Chancellor of Ireland 1494–1495; translated to Salisbury 8 January 1500 and Canterbury in 1501.
1500	1504	Thomas Pigot OSB	Appointed 4 May 1500; died 15 August 1504.
1504	1508	John Penny OCanSA	Appointed 30 August and consecrated in 1505; translated to Carlisle 22 September 1508.
1509	1533	Thomas Skevington OCist	Thomas Skeffington; formerly Abbot of Waverley; appointed 22 February and consecrated 17 June 1509; died 16 August 1533.

=== Bishops during the Reformation ===
Bishops of Bangor during the Reformation
From	Until	Incumbent	Notes
1534	1539	John Capon OSB	John Salcot; elected bishop between November 1533 and January 1534; consecrated 19 April 1534; translated to Salisbury 14 August 1539.
1539	1541	John Bird OCarm	Also spelt "Byrde". Translated from the suffragan see of Penreth, traditionally associated with Penrith; but since he was consecrated for the Diocese of Llandaff this must be a doubtful identification. Elected 24 July and received possession of the temporalities 9 September 1539; translated to Chester 4 August 1541.
1541	1552	Arthur Bulkeley	Elected 18 November 1541 and consecrated 19 February 1542; died 14 March 1553.
1552	1555	See vacant	
1555	1558	William Glyn	William Glynn or Glynne; consecrated 8 September 1555; died 21 May 1558.
1558		Maurice Clenock	Maurice Clynnog; first head of the English College, Rome; elected bishop, but was never consecrated, owing to the change of religion under Elizabeth I of England.

=== Post-Reformation bishops ===
==== Bishops of the Church of England ====
Bishops of Bangor
From	Until	Incumbent	Notes
1559	1566	Rowland Meyrick	Consecrated 21 December 1559; died 24 January 1566.
1566	1585	Nicholas Robinson	Consecrated 20 October 1566; died 3 February 1585.
1586	1595	Hugh Bellot	Consecrated 30 January 1586; translated to Chester 25 September 1595.
1596	1597	Richard Vaughan	Formerly Archdeacon of Middlesex; consecrated 22 January 1596; translated to Chester 9 July 1597.
1598	1616	Henry Rowlands	Consecrated 12 November 1598; died 6 July 1616.
1616	1631	Lewis Bayly	Consecrated 8 December 1616; died 26 October 1631.
1632	1633	David Dolben	Consecrated Circa 23 March 1632; died 27 November 1633.
1634	1637	Edmund Griffith	Formerly Dean of Bangor; consecrated 16 February 1634; died 26 May 1637.
1637	1665	William Roberts	Formerly Sub-Dean of Wells; consecrated 3 September 1637; deprived of the see when the English episcopacy was abolished by Parliament on 9 October 1646.
1646	1660	The see was abolished during the Commonwealth and the Protectorate.	
1637	1665	William Roberts	Restored; died 12 August 1665.
1665	1666	Robert Price	Died before he was consecrated.
1666	1673	Robert Morgan	Formerly Archdeacon of Merioneth; consecrated 1 July 1666; died 1 September 1673.
1673	1689	Humphrey Lloyd	Formerly Dean of St Asaph; consecrated 16 November 1673; died 18 January 1689.
1689	1701	Humphrey Humphreys	Formerly Dean of Bangor; consecrated 30 June 1689; translated to Hereford 2 December 1701.
1701	1716	John Evans	Consecrated 4 January 1702; translated to Meath, Ireland in January 1716.
1716	1721	Benjamin Hoadly	Formerly Rector of St Peter's-le-Poor, London; consecrated 18 March 1716; translated to Hereford 7 November 1721.
1721	1723	Richard Reynolds	Formerly Dean of Peterborough; consecrated in early 1722; translated to Lincoln 17 June 1723.
1723	1727	William Baker	Formerly Warden of Wadham College, Oxford; consecrated 11 August 1723; translated to Norwich 19 December 1727.
1728	1734	Thomas Sherlock	Formerly Dean of Chichester; consecrated 4 February 1728; translated to Salisbury 8 November 1734.
1734	1737	Charles Cecil	Translated from Bristol in late 1734; died 29 May 1737.
1737	1743	Thomas Herring	Formerly Dean of Rochester; consecrated 15 January 1738; translated to York 21 April 1743 then Canterbury in 1747.
1743	1747	Matthew Hutton	Consecrated 13 November 1743; translated to York 10 December 1747 then Canterbury in 1757.
1748	1756	Zachary Pearce	Formerly Dean of Winchester; consecrated 21 February 1748; translated to Rochester 4 June 1756.
1756	1768	John Egerton	Formerly Dean of Hereford; consecrated 4 July 1756; translated to Lichfield 12 November 1768.
1769	1774	John Ewer	Translated from Llandaff 10 January 1769; died 28 October 1774.
1774	1783	John Moore	Formerly Dean of Canterbury; consecrated 12 February 1775; translated to Canterbury 26 April 1783.
1783	1800	John Warren	Translated from St David's 9 June 1783; died 27 January 1800.
1800	1806	William Cleaver	Translated from Chester 24 May 1800; then translated to St Asaph after 24 October 1806.
1807	1809	John Randolph	Translated from Oxford 6 January 1807; then translated to London 9 August 1809.
1809	1830	Henry Majendie	Translated from Chester 5 October 1809; died 9 July 1830.
1830	1859	Christopher Bethell	Translated from Exeter 28 October 1830; died 19 April 1859.
1859	1890	James Colquhoun Campbell	Formerly Archdeacon of Llandaff; consecrated 14 June 1859; resigned in April 1890; died 9 November 1895.
1890	1898	Daniel Lewis Lloyd	Formerly Headmaster of Friars School, Bangor and Christ College, Brecon; consecrated 24 June 1890; resigned in November 1898; died 4 August 1899.
1899	1920	Watkin Williams	Consecrated 2 February 1899.

==== Bishops of the disestablished Church in Wales ====
Bishops of Bangor
From	Until	Incumbent	Notes
1920	1924	Watkin Williams	The Church in Wales was disestablished in 1920. Resigned 11 November 1924; died 19 November 1944.
1925	1928	Daniel Davies	Consecrated 24 February 1925; died 23 August 1928.
1928	1944	Charles Green	Translated from Monmouth; elected 25 September 1928; also was Archbishop of Wales 1934–1944; died 7 May 1944.
1944	1948	David Edwardes Davies	Consecrated 25 July 1944; resigned in November 1948; died 15 May 1950.
1949	1956	John Jones	Consecrated 6 January 1949; died 13 October 1956.
1957	1982	Gwilym Williams	Consecrated 1 May 1957; also was Archbishop of Wales 1971–1982; resigned 30 September 1982; died 23 December 1990.
1982	1992	Cledan Mears	Consecrated 21 December 1982; retired in 1992.
1993	1999	Barry Morgan	Elected and consecrated in 1993; translated to Llandaff in 1999.
2000	2004	Saunders Davies	Elected in 1999; consecrated and enthroned in January 2000; retired 18 February 2004.
2004	2008	Anthony Crockett	Formerly Archdeacon of Carmarthen and Vicar of Cynwyl Elfed, Cwm Duad and Newchurch; elected 4 May 2004; consecrated 16 July 2004; enthroned 18 September 2004; died in office 30 June 2008.
2008	2025	Andy John	Consecrated 29 November 2008 and enthroned 24 January 2009; also Archbishop of Wales from 6 December 2021 to 21 June 2025
2026	-	Manon Ceridwen James	Formerly Dean of Bangor Cathedral. Elected on 16 June 2026.

== Assistant bishops ==
Assistant Bishop of Bangor
From	Until	Incumbent	Notes
1971	1976	Benjamin Vaughan	Previously Bishop of British Honduras (Belize); Assistant to Gwilym Williams (as Archbishop), remaining Dean of Bangor; became Bishop of Swansea and Brecon in 1976.
2022	2023	Mary Stallard	Assistant to John (as Archbishop), remaining Archdeacon of Bangor; elected Bishop of Llandaff, 2023. Consecrated a bishop by John on 26 February 2022 at Bangor Cathedral; election to Llandaff confirmed 19 April 2023.
2024	present	David Morris, Bishop of Bardsey	Consecrated 11 May 2024. Also titular Bishop of Bardsey.

== See also ==
- Archdeacon of Bangor
