= 2007–08 Llanelli Scarlets season =

Llanelli Scarlets
- 2007–08 season
- Chairman: Stuart Gallacher
- Head coach: Phil Davies (until 30 April 2008); Paul Moriarty (caretaker, since 30 April 2008)
- Celtic League: 6th
- EDF Energy Cup: Group stage
- Heineken Cup: Group stage
- Top try scorer: League: Regan King (7); All: Regan King (9)
- Top points scorer: League: Rhys Priestland (107); All: Stephen Jones (128)
- Highest home attendance: 10,739 vs Ospreys (27 December 2007)
- Lowest home attendance: 5,923 vs Newport Gwent Dragons (1 September 2007)

The 2007–08 season was the fifth in the history of the Llanelli Scarlets regional side. The season saw the Scarlets compete in three competitions: the Celtic League, the EDF Energy Cup and the Heineken Cup. It was also the last full season for the Scarlets in their historic home, Stradey Park. A new ground, Parc y Scarlets, was under construction during that season, and is scheduled to open in November 2008, early in the 2008–09 season.

On the whole, the season was regarded as a disappointment by pundits and fans alike, as the team failed to qualify from the group stage in either the EDF Energy Cup or the Heineken Cup, even failing to pick up any points from any of their six Heineken Cup matches. The team's league form started off much better, remaining around second place for much of the first half of the season. However, as teams began to get players back from World Cup duty, the Scarlets' league form began to suffer, winning just two games in 2008, resulting in a sixth-place finish in the Celtic League. These failures were largely blamed on the team's failure to strengthen the squad sufficiently the previous summer and resulted in coach Phil Davies departing the club.

Welsh internationals Dwayne Peel, Alix Popham and Matthew Watkins also agreed deals to move away from Stradey Park at the end of the season, while hooker Mahonri Schwalger was signed on a short-term contract mid-season to cover for the injured Ken Owens. Other big-name signings in summer 2007 included Welsh internationals Ben Broster and Nathan Brew, as well as Scottish prop Bruce Douglas and English front-five forwards Adam Eustace and James Hayter.

== Pre-season and friendlies ==
The Scarlets prepared for the 2007–08 campaign with two pre-season friendly matches in August. The first friendly was away to the Exeter Chiefs on 18 August 2007, and gave the Scarlets an opportunity to give debuts to their three new front row players, James Hayter, Bruce Douglas and Ben Broster. Exeter had a pair of ex-Scarlets in their team, in the form of Clive Stuart-Smith and Craig Dunlea, but their knowledge of the Scarlets was not enough to prevent a 19–14 win for the Llanelli side.

The next friendly was against Bath at Stradey Park on 25 August 2007. The Scarlets took a 14–7 lead before half-time, and went 17–7 up within the first five minutes of the second half. However, there were to be no further scores for the home side, as Bath scored two more tries to win the game 21–17.

Date	Opponents	H / A	Result F–A	Scorers	Attendance
18 August 2007	Exeter Chiefs	A	19–14	Tries: Daniel, Bater, John; Con: Priestland, C. Thomas	
25 August 2007	Bath	H	17–21	Tries: Daniel 2' c, King 32' c Con: C. Thomas (2); Pen: C. Thomas 44'	

== Celtic League ==
Date	Opponents	H / A	Result F–A	Scorers	Attendance	League position
1 September 2007	Newport Gwent Dragons	H	23–30	Tries: Gar. Evans 44' c, I. Thomas 50' c Con: C. Thomas (2); Pen: C. Thomas (3) 20', 55', 65'	5,923	4th
11 September 2007	Ospreys	A	14–9	Try: Eustace 45' m Pen: C. Thomas (3) 2', 64', 74'	10,143	2nd
22 September 2007	Munster	A	16–26	Try: Watkins 64' c Con: Priestland; Pen: Priestland (3) 8', 35', 63'	3,400	2nd
28 September 2007	Connacht	H	34–11	Tries: King 36' c, Cooper 55' c, Stoddart 62' c, J. Davies 80+1' c Con: Priestland (4); Pen: Priestland (2) 27', 33'	6,560	2nd
5 October 2007	Leinster	A	52–23	Tries: Watkins 3' c, Bater 49' c, Edwards (2) 53' m, 59' c, King 56' c, Stoddart 80' c Con: Priestland (5); Pen: Priestland (4) 13', 22', 32', 51'	9,439	2nd
12 October 2007	Ulster	H	32–8	Tries: Watkins 22' c, Edwards 35' m, Manu 40' c, M. Jones 51' c Con: Priestland (3); Pen: Priestland (2) 18', 72'	6,200	2nd
25 November 2007	Edinburgh	A	17–27	Tries: King (3) 15' m, 38' c, 49' m Con: Priestland	1,638	2nd
27 December 2007	Ospreys	H	17–12	Tries: G. Thomas 16' c, Brew 49' c Con: S. Jones (2); Pen: S. Jones 48'	10,739	4th
1 January 2008	Newport Gwent Dragons	A	13–15	Try: Penalty try 33' c Con: Priestland; Pen: Priestland (2) 6', 58'	6,702	3rd
4 January 2008	Connacht	A	18–20	Pen: Priestland (6) 14', 22', 49', 67', 73', 80'	1,681	4th
15 February 2008	Glasgow Warriors	H	30–7	Tries: Cattle 24' c, King 36' m, 76' m, Priestland 50' m, I. Thomas 61' m Con: Priestland; Pen: Priestland 13'	6,190	2nd
29 February 2008	Ulster	A	8–20	Try: Priestland 64' m Pen: Priestland 39'	8,869	2nd
21 March 2008	Cardiff Blues	H	35–17	Tries: I. Thomas 11' m, Gav. Evans 21' c, Peel 57' c, James 73' c Con: S. Jones (3); Pen: S. Jones (3) 38', 54', 71'	8,445	2nd
29 March 2008	Leinster	H	10–24	Try: D. Jones 52' c Con: S. Jones; Pen: S. Jones 16'	7,407	4th
11 April 2008	Cardiff Blues	A	26–35	Tries: Peel 4' c, J. Davies 6' c, M. Jones 52' m, Stoddart 54' c Con: S. Jones (3)	10,216	4th
18 April 2008	Glasgow Warriors	A	23–25	Tries: Stoddart (2) 42' c, 53' c Con: S. Jones (2); Pen: S. Jones (3) 11', 33', 61'	2,012	5th
3 May 2008	Munster	H	23–24	Tries: James 28' c, Watkins 31' c Con: S. Jones (2); Pen: S. Jones (3) 6', 23', 57'	7,020	6th
10 May 2008	Edinburgh	H	12–29	Tries: Schwalger 14' c, James 77' m Con: Priestland	7,338	6th

Pos	Club	Pld	W	D	L	F	A	PD	BP	Pts
5	Glasgow Warriors	18	10	1	7	340	349	−9	4	46
6	Llanelli Scarlets	18	7	0	11	403	362	+41	11	39
7	Ospreys	18	6	1	11	321	255	+66	11	37

Pld = Matches played; W = Matches won; D = Matches drawn; L = Matches lost; F = Points for; A = Points against; PD = Points difference; BP = Bonus points; Pts = Points

== EDF Energy Cup ==
Date	Opponents	H / A	Result F–A	Scorers	Attendance	Group position
26 October 2007	Bristol	A	11–18	Try: Stoddart 80+1' m Pen: Priestland 4', S. Jones 43'	7,139	3rd
2 November 2007	Leeds Carnegie	H	59–19	Tries: D. Evans (2) 3' c, 67' c, Bater 10' c, M. Jones 16' c, Popham 38' c I. Thomas 51' c, MacLeod 59' c, Easterby 64' c Con: S. Jones (8); Pen: S. Jones 26'	7,672	2nd
1 December 2007	Saracens	H	36–32	Tries: MacLeod 35' c, S. Jones 43' c, J. Davies 51' m, Gar. Evans 55' m Con: S. Jones (2); Pen: S. Jones (4) 10', 16', 40', 62'	6,625	2nd

Team	Pld	W	D	L	F	A	BP	Pts
Saracens	3	2	0	1	123	79	4	12
Llanelli Scarlets	3	2	0	1	106	69	3	11
Bristol	3	1	1	1	46	69	0	6
Leeds Carnegie	3	0	1	2	60	118	1	3

== Heineken Cup ==
Date	Opponents	H / A	Result F–A	Scorers	Attendance	Group position
11 November 2007	ASM Clermont Auvergne	A	21–48	Tries: James 18' c, Peel 52' c, King 54' c Con: S. Jones (3)	13,000	4th
17 November 2007	London Wasps	H	17–33	Tries: Easterby 24' c, M. Jones 79' c Con: S. Jones (2); Pen: S. Jones 34'	9,557	4th
8 December 2007	Munster	H	16–29	Try: King 24' c Con: Priestland; Pen: Priestland (3) 20', 51', 59'	10,456	4th
16 December 2007	Munster	A	13–22	Try: S. Jones 11' c Con: S. Jones; Pen: S. Jones (2) 49', 63'	13,200	4th
13 January 2008	London Wasps	A	7–40	Try: Manu 33' c Con: Priestland	8,173	4th
19 January 2008	ASM Clermont Auvergne	H	0–41		6,491	4th

Team	Pld	W	D	L	TF	PF	PA	PD	BP	Pts
(Ireland) Munster (6)	6	4	0	2	13	148	95	+53	3	19
(France) Clermont	6	4	0	2	22	189	128	+61	3	19
(England) London Wasps	6	4	0	2	19	152	127	+25	2	18
(Wales) Llanelli Scarlets	6	0	0	6	8	74	213	−139	0	0

== Squad statistics ==
Pos.	Name	Magners League						EDF Energy Cup						Heineken Cup						Total						Discipline	
Pos.	Name	A	T	C	P	D	Pts	A	T	C	P	D	Pts	A	T	C	P	D	Pts	A	T	C	P	D	Pts	Yellow card	Red card
FB	(Wales) Garan Evans	7	1	0	0	0	5	1	1	0	0	0	5	3	0	0	0	0	0	11	2	0	0	0	10	0	0
FB	(Wales) Morgan Stoddart	16	5	0	0	0	25	2	1	0	0	0	5	5	0	0	0	0	0	23	6	0	0	0	30	1	0
WG	(Wales) Nathan Brew	10	1	0	0	0	5	0	0	0	0	0	0	2	0	0	0	0	0	12	1	0	0	0	5	0	0
WG	(Wales) Darren Daniel	6	0	0	0	0	0	0	0	0	0	0	0	3	0	0	0	0	0	9	0	0	0	0	0	2	0
WG	(Wales) Dan Evans	2	0	0	0	0	0	1	2	0	0	0	10	0	0	0	0	0	0	3	2	0	0	0	10	0	0
WG	(Wales) Dafydd James	9	3	0	0	0	15	2	0	0	0	0	0	2	1	0	0	0	0	13	4	0	0	0	20	0	0
WG	(Wales) Mark Jones	6	2	0	0	0	10	3	1	0	0	0	5	5	1	0	0	0	5	14	4	0	0	0	20	2	0
CE	(Wales) Jonathan Davies	6	2	0	0	0	10	1	1	0	0	0	5	3	0	0	0	0	0	10	3	0	0	0	15	0	0
CE	(Wales) Gavin Evans	14	1	0	0	0	5	2	0	0	0	0	0	5	0	0	0	0	0	21	1	0	0	0	5	0	0
CE	(New Zealand) Regan King	16	7	0	0	0	35	3	0	0	0	0	0	4	2	0	0	0	10	23	9	0	0	0	45	0	0
CE	(Wales) Matthew Watkins	13	4	0	0	0	20	1	0	0	0	0	0	4	0	0	0	0	0	18	4	0	0	0	20	0	0
FH	(Wales) Stephen Jones	6	0	13	11	0	59	3	1	10	6	0	43	3	1	6	3	0	26	12	2	29	20	0	128	0	0
FH	(Wales) Rhys Priestland	13	2	17	21	0	107	1	0	0	1	0	3	3	0	2	3	0	13	17	2	19	25	0	123	0	0
FH	(Wales) Ceiron Thomas	9	0	2	6	0	22	0	0	0	0	0	0	4	0	0	0	0	0	13	0	2	6	0	22	0	0
SH	(Wales) Gavin Cattle	14	1	0	0	0	5	1	0	0	0	0	0	2	0	0	0	0	0	17	1	0	0	0	5	0	0
SH	(Wales) Liam Davies	9	0	0	0	0	0	0	0	0	0	0	0	3	0	0	0	0	0	12	0	0	0	0	0	0	0
SH	(Wales) Dwayne Peel	6	2	0	0	0	10	3	0	0	0	0	0	4	1	0	0	0	5	13	3	0	0	0	15	0	0
PR	(Wales) Ben Broster	5	0	0	0	0	0	0	0	0	0	0	0	2	0	0	0	0	0	7	0	0	0	0	0	1	0
PR	(Scotland) Bruce Douglas	9	0	0	0	0	0	2	0	0	0	0	0	3	0	0	0	0	0	14	0	0	0	0	0	0	0
PR	(Wales) Phil John	12	0	0	0	0	0	1	0	0	0	0	0	0	0	0	0	0	0	13	0	0	0	0	0	0	0
PR	(Fiji) Deacon Manu	12	1	0	0	0	5	3	0	0	0	0	0	6	1	0	0	0	5	21	2	0	0	0	10	1	0
PR	(Wales) Iestyn Thomas	15	3	0	0	0	15	2	1	0	0	0	5	6	0	0	0	0	0	23	4	0	0	0	20	1	0
HK	(Wales) Daniel George	1	0	0	0	0	0	0	0	0	0	0	0	1	0	0	0	0	0	2	0	0	0	0	0	0	0
HK	(England) James Hayter	8	0	0	0	0	0	2	0	0	0	0	0	5	0	0	0	0	0	15	0	0	0	0	0	0	0
HK	(Wales) Ken Owens	9	0	0	0	0	0	0	0	0	0	0	0	0	0	0	0	0	0	9	0	0	0	0	0	0	0
HK	(Wales) Matthew Rees	7	0	0	0	0	0	2	0	0	0	0	0	3	0	0	0	0	0	12	0	0	0	0	0	1	0
HK	(Samoa) Mahonri Schwalger	7	1	0	0	0	5	0	0	0	0	0	0	1	0	0	0	0	0	8	1	0	0	0	5	0	0
LK	(Wales) Vernon Cooper	14	1	0	0	0	5	2	0	0	0	0	0	4	0	0	0	0	0	20	0	0	0	0	0	2	0
LK	(Wales) Dominic Day	3	0	0	0	0	0	0	0	0	0	0	0	1	0	0	0	0	0	4	0	0	0	0	0	0	0
LK	(England) Adam Eustace	11	1	0	0	0	5	3	0	0	0	0	0	6	0	0	0	0	0	20	1	0	0	0	5	1	0
LK	(Scotland) Scott MacLeod	10	0	0	0	0	0	3	2	0	0	0	10	6	0	0	0	0	0	19	2	0	0	0	10	0	0
LK	(Wales) Lou Reed	10	0	0	0	0	0	0	0	0	0	0	0	0	0	0	0	0	0	10	0	0	0	0	0	1	0
FL	(Wales) James Bater	15	1	0	0	0	5	1	1	0	0	0	5	3	0	0	0	0	0	19	2	0	0	0	10	2	0
FL	(Ireland) Simon Easterby	9	0	0	0	0	0	3	1	0	0	0	5	5	1	0	0	0	5	17	2	0	0	0	10	1	0
FL	(Wales) Johnathan Edwards	5	3	0	0	0	15	1	0	0	0	0	0	0	0	0	0	0	0	6	3	0	0	0	15	0	0
FL	(Wales) Dafydd Jones	16	1	0	0	0	5	2	0	0	0	0	0	4	0	0	0	0	0	22	1	0	0	0	5	0	0
FL	(Wales) Gavin Thomas	6	1	0	0	0	5	2	0	0	0	0	0	5	0	0	0	0	0	13	1	0	0	0	5	0	0
FL	(Wales) Josh Turnbull	0	0	0	0	0	0	0	0	0	0	0	0	0	0	0	0	0	0	0	0	0	0	0	0	0	0
N8	(Wales) Alix Popham	6	0	0	0	0	0	2	1	0	0	0	5	5	0	0	0	0	0	13	1	0	0	0	5	2	0
N8	(Wales) Nathan Thomas	14	0	0	0	0	0	0	0	0	0	0	0	4	0	0	0	0	0	18	0	0	0	0	0	0	0

== Transfers ==
=== In ===
Date	Pos.	Name	From
17 May 2007	PR	(Wales) Ben Broster	Saracens
1 June 2007	WG	(Wales) Nathan Brew	Newport Gwent Dragons
1 June 2007	LK	(England) Adam Eustace	Gloucester
19 June 2007	PR	(Scotland) Bruce Douglas	Border Reivers
20 July 2007	HK	(England) James Hayter	Harlequins
16 January 2008	HK	(Samoa) Mahonri Schwalger	Wellington Lions

=== Out ===
Date	Pos.	Name	To
1 June 2007	SH	(England) Clive Stuart-Smith	Exeter Chiefs
1 June 2007	PR	(Wales) John Davies	Retired
4 June 2007	PR	(New Zealand) Craig Dunlea	Exeter Chiefs
5 June 2007	PR	(Wales) Hugh Gustafson	Newport Gwent Dragons
14 June 2007	FB	(Wales) Barry Davies	Brive
21 June 2007	LK	(Tonga) Inoke Afeaki	Grenoble
22 June 2007	LK	(Wales) Adam Jones	Newport Gwent Dragons
27 July 2007	FL	(Wales) Jonathan Mills	London Welsh
27 July 2007	HK	(Wales) Aled Gravelle	Waterloo

=== Loan out ===
Date from	Date to	Position	Name	To
18 December 2007	18 January 2008	LK	(Wales) Lou Reed	Rotherham
