= List of Archdeacons of Merioneth =

This is a list of the archdeacons of Meirionnydd. The Archdeacon of Meirionydd is the priest in charge of the archdeaconry of Meirionydd, an administrative division of the Church in Wales Diocese of Bangor. The archdeaconry comprises the five deaneries of Ardudwy, Arwystili, Cyfeiliog/Mawddwy, Llyn/Eifionydd and Ystumaner.

== Archdeacons of Meirionydd ==
=== Medieval period ===
- (1328)(1331) Tudur ap Adda
- 1358-1387 Samuel de Wyk
- 1387 - John Sloley
- -1404 John ap Rhys
- 1404- John Fychan
- 1405 Gruffydd Young
- -1410 Matthew Peyworden (alias Wotton)
- 1410- Roger Hungarten
- 1416- John Estcourt
- 1436 Richard Gele
- 1485 Richard Bulkeley

=== Modern period ===
- 1504 Richard Bromfield
- ?-1524 William Glyn (afterwards Archdeacon of Anglesey, 1524)
- 1524-1562 William Roberts
- 1562-1566 Nicholas Robinson, then held in commendam to 1573 (afterwards Bishop of Bangor, 1566)
- 1574-1576 Humphrey Robinson
- 1576-1623 Edmund Prys
- 1623-1657 Robert White
- 1660–1666 Robert Morgan (afterwards Bishop of Bangor, 1666)
- 1666-1668 John Lloyd
- 1668-1672 William Lloyd (later Bishop of Llandaff, 1675)
- 1672-1676 Simon Lloyd
- 1676-1680 Michael Hughes
- 1680-1683 Hugh Pugh
- 1683-1713 Francis Lloyd,
- 1713-1716 Lancelot Bulkley
- 1716 Richard Langford
- 1733 Hugh Wynne
- 1754 John Ellis
- 1785 John Roberts
- 1802-1809 Peter Williams
- 1809-1834 John Jones
- 1834-1857 Richard Newcombe
- 1857-1866 Henry Weir White (deceased)
- 1866-1891 John Evans (deceased)
- 1891-1906 Thomas Williams (deceased)
- 1906-1931 John Lloyd Jones
- 1931-1940 Thomas Williams
- 1940-1952 David Jenkins
- 1952-1953 John Rhys Davies (deceased)
- 1953-1959 Henry Williams
- 1959-1976 Wallis Thomas
- 1976-1983 Thomas Bayley Hughes (afterwards Archdeacon of Bangor)
- 1983-1986 Elwyn Roberts (afterwards Archdeacon of Bangor, 1986)
- 1986-1993 Barry Morgan (afterwards Bishop of Bangor, 1993)
- 1993-1999 Saunders Davies (afterwards Bishop of Bangor, 2000)
- 2000-2002 Carl Cooper (afterwards Bishop of St David's, 2002)
- 2002-2004 Arfon Williams
- 2004-2010 Emyr Rowlands
- 2010–2023 Andrew Jones (resigned March or 24 February 2023)
- 1 October 2023 – present Robert Townsend

Robert William Townsend (born 1968) was announced on 4 June 2023 as the next Archdeacon of Meirionnydd, starting from his collation on 1 October 2023. After studying at University College of North Wales (now Bangor University), he trained for the ministry at St Michael's College, Llandaff. Townsend was made deacon on 3 July 1993 and ordained priest on 24 June 1995, serving his title posts as assistant curate of Dolgellau (until 1994) and then a Minor Canon of Bangor Cathedral (1994–1996). He was then an incumbent in the same diocese until 2003, when he became Diocesan Schools Officer of the Diocese of St Davids and (at the same time) Priest-in-Charge of Llanilar until 2006; during this time, he was awarded his Master of Arts (MA) by University of Liverpool in 2004. He returned to Bangor diocese in 2006, holding several parochial and diocesan posts simultaneously since then: including Diocesan Director of Education, Area Dean, Communications Officer since 2012, Canon of Bangor Cathedral since 2012, and Ministry Area Leader of Bro Seiriol since 2019.

== Sources ==
- British history online
- s:Page:Fasti ecclesiae Anglicanae Vol.1 body of work.djvu/158
- s:Page:Fasti ecclesiae Anglicanae Vol.1 body of work.djvu/159
