= Wynne-Jones =

Wynne-Jones, Wynn-Jones and Wynne Jones are variations of a surname. "Wynne Jones" can also be a middle name and surname.

Notable people with the surnames include:

== Wynne-Jones ==
- William Wynne-Jones, Baron Wynne-Jones (1903–1982), a British chemist
- Tim Wynne-Jones (born 1948), an English–Canadian author
- Nancy Wynne-Jones (1922–2006), a Welsh and Irish artist
- Ros Wynne-Jones, journalist and author
- Vere Wynne-Jones (1950–2006), broadcast journalist
- Grace Wynne-Jones, journalist and writer
- Llewelyn Wynne-Jones (1859–1936), Welsh Anglican priest

== Wynn-Jones ==
- Michael Wynn-Jones is a Welsh-born writer, editor and publisher

== Wynne Jones ==
- David Wynne Jones, Australian Scout leader
- Diana Wynne Jones (1934–2011), British writer
- Owen Wynne Jones (1828–1870), Welsh clergyman
- Ivor Wynne Jones (1927–2007), Welsh journalist
- John Wynne Jones (1803–1888), Welsh Anglican priest
- Gethin Wynne Jones (born 1995), Welsh professional footballer
