= Elwyn Roberts =

Welsh Anglican priest

Elwyn Roberts (1931 – February 2009) was a Welsh Anglican priest.

Roberts was educated at Bangor University; Keble College, Oxford; and St Michael's College, Llandaff. He was ordained deacon in 1955 and priest in 1956. After a curacy in Bangor he was Librarian of St Michael's College, Llandaff. He was Vicar of St David, Bangor, from 1966 to 1971; and Rector of St George, Llandudno, from 1971 to 1983. He was Archdeacon of Merioneth from 1983 to 1986; and Archdeacon of Bangor from 1986 to 1999.

He died at the age of 77, having suffered from Parkinson's disease since 1984.

Church in Wales titles
Preceded by Wallis Thomas	Archdeacon of Merioneth; 1983–1986	Succeeded by Barry Morgan
Preceded by Thomas Hughes	Archdeacon of Bangor; 1986–1999	Succeeded by Alun Hawkins
