= Rachub =

Village in Gwynedd, Wales

Coordinates: 53.191°N 4.061°W

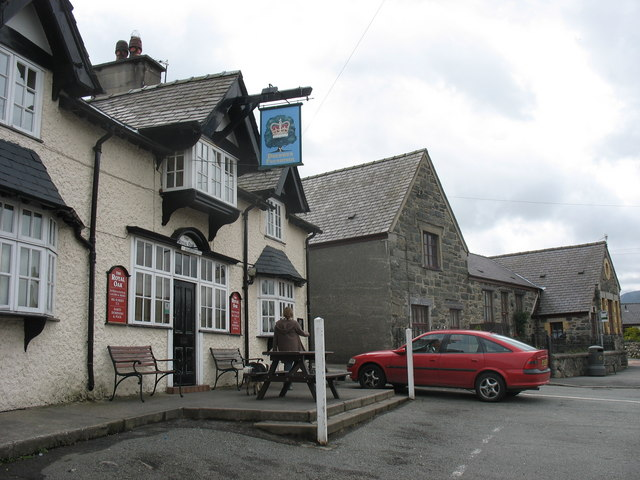
- Y Dderwen Frenhinol – The Royal Oak

- Location within Gwynedd
- OS grid reference: SH623680
- Community: Bethesda
- Principal area: Gwynedd
- Country: Wales
- Sovereign state: United Kingdom
- Post town: BANGOR
- Postcode district: LL57
- Dialling code: 01248
- Police: North Wales
- Fire: North Wales
- Ambulance: Welsh
- UK Parliament: Dwyfor Meirionnydd
- Senedd Cymru – Welsh Parliament: Arfon

Rachub (Welsh: ['raχɨb]) is a village of about 900 people in Dyffryn Ogwen (the Ogwen Valley), Gwynedd, Wales, about three-quarters of a mile (1.2 km) north of the town of Bethesda. It forms part of the Llanllechid community, which had a population of 889 in the 2011 census.

== Origins ==
The name Rachub is thought to have come from Yr Achub, which in Old Welsh was a term for an area of land. However, in modern Welsh Yr Achub roughly translates as The Saving or Safe place: there is a tradition that when enemy forces were in the area the locals would flee to Rachub for safety (although the village did not then exist).

Rachub was considered no more than a part of Llanllechid parish until the 19th century, when the slate industry expanded in the valley, and Rachub grew as a separate village. Before then, the village consisted of a few houses and the Carmel chapel. Most of the area was farmland, used mostly for sheep. This changed considerably over the last half of the 18th century and the 19th century, with farms giving way to housing. Much of the housing was concentrated in small streets off the High Street. The many ranks of terrace houses are served by a narrow foot lanes connected to the High Street. At the top of the village and to the east of the High Street, slate and stone quarry waste heaps prevent further housing development. In the 20th century some new housing has been established in the lower parts of the village especially along Lon Henbarc.

== Day-to-day life ==
Welsh is the main language in the village. In 1991, 83% of residents spoke Welsh. This figure has since declined with the 2011 census indicating 73% of the population as Welsh speakers, with 82% having skills in Welsh

The higher part of the village, which goes up towards the Carneddau mountains, is considerably more English-speaking than the lower parts of the village.

Most residents commute to work from the village, many to Bangor. The main gathering points include the local pub (The Royal Oak or Y Dderwen Frenhinol) and the local post office. Rachub is home to Ysgol Llanllechid (the Welsh-language primary school), and a chapel. Rachub is often considered to be a part of Bethesda rather than a separate entity. Villagers will variously say that they are from either Rachub, Llanllechid or Bethesda, depending on whichever one takes their fancy at the time.

== Notable residents ==
- The artist and writer Brenda Chamberlain (1912–1971) and her husband the artist John Petts (1914–1991) lived in Rachub, where they set up the Caseg Press.
- Gruff Rhys (born 1970), lead singer of the Super Furry Animals, lived in Rachub as a child.
- The film journalist and BAFTA For The Love of Film winner (2022), Dion Wyn Hughes(born 1987), was raised in the village.

== See also ==
- Bethesda, Gwynedd
- Dyffryn Ogwen
