= Llanllechid =

Village and community in Gwynedd, Wales

Coordinates: 53°12′N 4°04′W

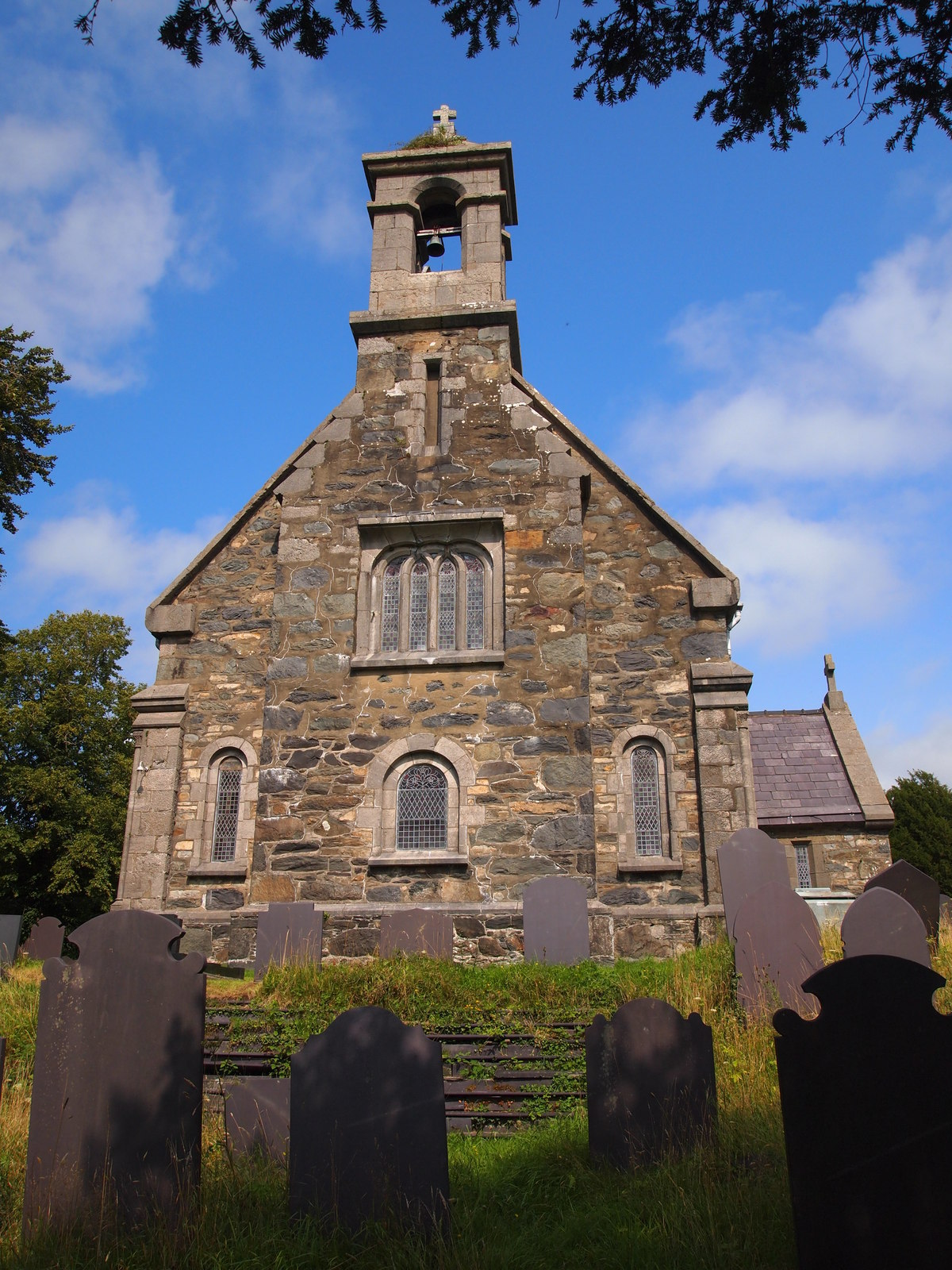
- Eglwys St Llechid, Llanllechid
- OS grid reference: SH623680
- Community: Llanllechid
- Principal area: Gwynedd
- Country: Wales
- Sovereign state: United Kingdom
- Post town: BANGOR
- Postcode district: LL57
- Dialling code: 01248
- Police: North Wales
- Fire: North Wales
- Ambulance: Welsh
- UK Parliament: Bangor Aberconwy
- Senedd Cymru – Welsh Parliament: Arfon
- List of places UK Wales Gwynedd Map of the community

Llanllechid (Welsh: [ɬanˈɬɛχɪd]) is a village and community in Gwynedd, Wales. The village is near Bethesda, and the community had a population of 889 at the 2011 UK census and an area of 46 square kilometres (18 sq mi). The community also includes Tal-y-Bont near Bangor, Gwynedd and a large part of the Carneddau range so is therefore sparsely populated.

== Eglwys St Llechid ==
St Llechid is the patron saint of the village, where she founded the parish church and a holy well (now lost). The church closed in 2002.

== Notable people ==
- John Francon Williams (1854–1911), writer, geographer, cartographer, journalist, editor, historian, inventor; born and grew up in Llanllechid.
- Elias Owen (1863–1888), a Welsh amateur football goalkeeper with three caps for Wales.
- Brenda Chamberlain (1912–1971), artist.
- Thomas Edwards orientalist, was born in Llanllechid in 1652.
- Gruff Rhys (born 1970), musician and member of Super Furry Animals.
- Margaret Thomas (born 1779), musician and hymn writer.
- Edward Stephen Welsh minister, musician, singer and composer. During the time he was minister of a chapel in Llanllechid he wrote a requiem in memory of John Jones, Talysarn.
- Thomas Bayley Hughes, Archdeacon of Bangor, (1983–1986) held an incumbency at Llanllechid.
- Evan Evans 18th c. poet and priest, held a curate at Llanllechid.
- Thomas Henry Wyatt was the architect of a church in Llanllechid circa 1855/6.
- John Petts 20th c. artist, and his wife Brenda Chamberlain artist, set up home near Llanllechid where they also held two joint exhibitions.
- Griffith Williams 17th c. former Bishop, who after his suspension in 1612, preached in Llanllechid.
