= Gilbert Wright (priest) =

Welsh Anglican priest

Evan Gilbert Wright (1903-1994) was a Welsh Anglican priest.

Wright was educated at St David's College, Lampeter. He was Archdeacon of Bangor from 1962 to 1973.

Church in Wales titles
Preceded by Gwynfryn Richards	Archdeacon of Bangor; 1962–1973	Succeeded by Hugh Arfon Evans
