= Paul Crotty =

Paul Crotty may refer to:

- Paul A. Crotty (born 1941), American judge
- Michael Paul Crotty (born 1941), retired senior Royal Air Force Commander and Aerospace director
