= John Morgan (archdeacon of Bangor) =

The Ven. John Morgan (1840–1924) was the Archdeacon of Bangor from 1902 to 1920.

Morgan was educated at Sidney Sussex College, Cambridge, and ordained in 1869. After curacies in Bangor and Llanberis, he was Vicar of Corris, Rector of Dowlais, Vicar of Bangor, then Rector of Llandudno before his appointment as Archdeacon.

He died on 1 January 1924.

Church in Wales titles
Preceded by John Pryce	Archdeacon of Bangor; 1902–1920	Succeeded by Owen Evans
