= John Wynne Jones =

Welsh Anglican priest

John Wynne Jones (1803–1888) was a Welsh Anglican priest.

Jones was educated at Jesus College, Oxford, where he matriculated in 1823, graduating B.A. in 1827, M.A. in 1829. He was made deacon in 1827 and ordained priest in 1828. After curacies at Llechylched, then Holyhead, he was Rector of Heneglwys from 1844 to 1868. He was then the Incumbent at Bodedern until his death on 8 February 1888; and Archdeacon of Bangor from 1863 to 1887; and Canon residentiary of Bangor from 1863.

Church in Wales titles
Preceded by John Jones	Archdeacon of Bangor; 1863–1887	Succeeded by John Pryce
