= Brenda Chamberlain =

Brenda Chamberlain may refer to:

- Brenda Chamberlain (politician)
- Brenda Chamberlain (artist)
