= Paul Davies (bishop) =

English priest

The Right Reverend Paul Davies
- Bishop of Dorking
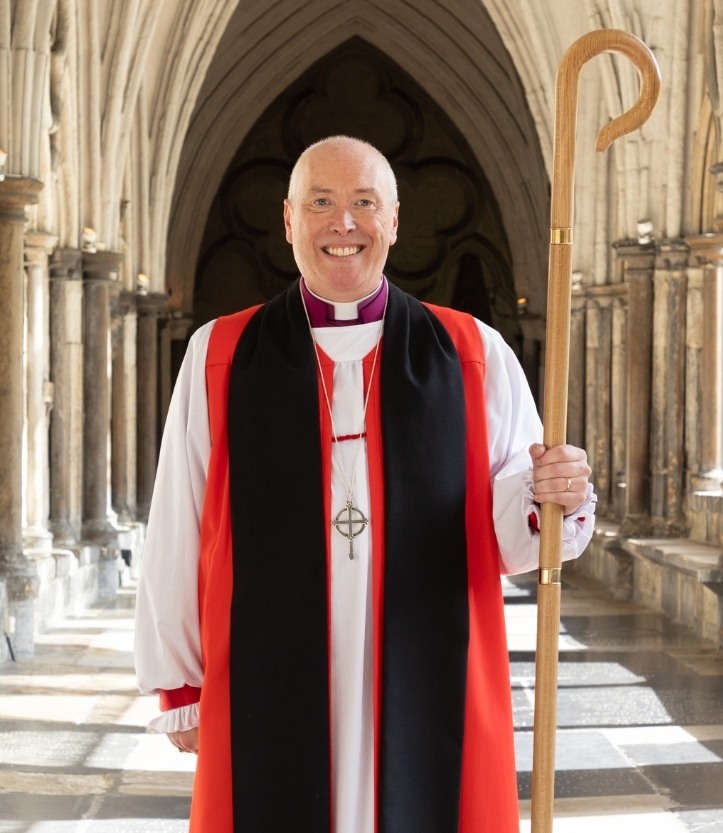
- Bishop Davies at his Consecration in September, 2023
- Church: Church of England
- Diocese: Diocese of Guildford
- In office: September 2023 to present
- Predecessor: Jo Bailey Wells
- Previous posts: Archdeacon of Surrey (2017–2023); Archdeacon of Bangor (2012–2017)

Orders
- Ordination: 1997 (deacon); 1998 (priest) by Huw Jones
- Consecration: 29 September 2023 by Justin Welby

Personal details
- Born: 15 March 1973 (age 53)
- Denomination: Anglicanism
- Education: University of Wales, Lampeter; Ripon College, Cuddesdon; Regent's Park College, Oxford

Richard Paul Davies (born 15 March 1973) is a British Anglican bishop. Since September 2023, he has been Bishop of Dorking in the Church of England's Diocese of Guildford. He was Archdeacon of Bangor from 2012 to 2017 and then Archdeacon of Surrey from 2017 until becoming a bishop.

== Early life and education ==
Davies was born on 15 March 1973 in Carmarthen, Carmarthenshire, Wales. He was educated at the Pembroke School, Pembrokeshire. He studied theology at the University of Wales, Lampeter, graduating with a Bachelor of Arts (BA) degree in 1994. From 1994 to 1997, he trained for ordination at Ripon College, Cuddesdon, an Anglican theological college. He also studied theology at Regent's Park College, Oxford, and graduated from the University of Oxford with a Master of Theology (MTh) degree.

== Ordained ministry ==
Davies was ordained in St Davids Cathedral for the Church in Wales as a deacon in 1997 and as a priest in 1998. He served his curacy as a minor canon at St Davids Cathedral in the Diocese of St Davids between 1997 and 2001. From 2001 to 2006, he continued his ministry at the cathedral as its succentor and was also team vicar of Solva and Brawdy, village churches that fell within the cathedral's parish. He was additionally Diocesan Ecumenical Officer from 2002 to 2006. In 2005, he became an officiating chaplain to the forces (OCF), a civilian who volunteers as a military chaplain. He was OCF to the 14th Signal Regiment, British Army, until 2007. In 2006, leaving the cathedral parish, he became vicar of Burry Port with Pwll. He was additionally diocesan director of ordinands from 2010 to 2012.

In October 2011, he was appointed Archdeacon of Bangor and Anglesey in the Diocese of Bangor. He was collated and installed as Archdeacon of Bangor and Anglesey at Bangor Cathedral on 19 February 2012. At the time of his installation (aged 38), Davies was the youngest archdeacon in Wales and England. He was additionally rector Llanfairmathafarneithaf with Llanbedrgoch and Pentraeth from 2012 to 2014. He was officiating chaplain to RAF Valley on Anglesey from 2015 to 2017.

In October 2017, Davies was announced as the next Archdeacon of Surrey, in the Church of England's Diocese of Guildford. He was collated as archdeacon on 10 December 2017.

=== Episcopal ministry ===
On 26 July 2023, it was announced that he would be the next Bishop of Dorking, a suffragan bishop of the Diocese of Guildford. On 29 September 2023, he was consecrated as a bishop by Justin Welby, Archbishop of Canterbury, during a service at Westminster Abbey. He was welcomed as the sixth Bishop of Dorking on 8 October during a service at Guildford Cathedral. Following the death of Andrew Watson, Bishop of Guildford he became interim Bishop of Guildford.

Church in Wales titles
Preceded by Meurig Llwyd Williams	Archdeacon of Bangor; 2012–2017	Succeeded by Mary Stallard
Church of England titles
Preceded by Stuart Beake	Archdeacon of Surrey; 2017–2023	Succeeded by Catharine Mabuza
