= Meurig Williams =

Archdeacon (born 1961)

Meurig Llwyd Williams (born 1961) was the Archdeacon of Bangor from 2005 to 2011; and Archdeacon of France, 2016–2021.

== Background ==
Williams is the son of a Baptist minister. He was born in Bangor, North Wales and reared in a Welsh-speaking household. He was educated at the University of Aberystwyth, studying modern languages. He taught in a school near Cardiff for four years.

== Ecclesiastical career ==
Williams studied theology at the University of Wales, trained for ordination at Westcott House, Cambridge and was ordained in 1990. After a curacy in Holyhead he was Priest in charge of Denio then Vicar of Eglwys Dewi Sant, Cardiff before his time as Archdeacon of Bangor and domestic chaplain to Geoffrey Rowell and then Robert Innes, both as Bishop in Europe, — and also as Acting Archdeacon of North West Europe — afterwards.

In January 2021 he was installed as rector in Mallow Union of Parishes, County Cork, Ireland.

Church in Wales titles
Preceded by Alun Hawkins	Archdeacon of Bangor; 2005–2011	Succeeded by Paul Davies
