= Richard Hughes (archdeacon of Bangor) =

The Ven. Richard Hughes (1881–1962) was the Archdeacon of Bangor from 1947 to 1957.

Morgan was educated at the University of London and Ripon College Cuddesdon and ordained in 1905. After curacies in Llanbeblig he held incumbencies in Dolwyddelan, Machynlleth and Holyhead.

He died on 26 October 1962.

Church in Wales titles
Preceded by Henry Morgan	Archdeacon of Bangor; 1947–1957	Succeeded by Gwynfryn Richards
