= Arfon Williams =

Welsh priest (born 1958)

Arfon Williams (born 1958) is a Welsh Anglican priest.

Williams was educated at Aberystwyth University and Wycliffe Hall Oxford. After a curacy in Carmarthen he held Incumbencies in Aberystwyth and . He was Archdeacon of Merioneth from 2002 until 2004; and has been Dean of Elphin and Ardagh since then.

Church in Wales titles
Preceded by Carl Cooper	Archdeacon of Wrexham; 2002–2004	Succeeded by Emyr Rowlands
Church of Ireland titles
Preceded by David Griscome	Dean of Elphin; 2004–	Succeeded by Incumbent
