= James Hayter =

James Hayter may refer to:

- James Hayter (actor) (1907–1983), British actor
- James Hayter (footballer) (born 1979), English footballer
- James Hayter (RAF officer) (1917–2006), New Zealand flying ace of the Second World War
- James Hayter (rugby union) (born 1978), English former rugby union player
