= Emyr Rowlands =

Church in Wales priest

Emyr Wyn Rowlands (b February 1942) is a Church in Wales priest. He was Archdeacon of Merioneth from 2004 to 2010.

Jones was educated at St. Michael's College, Llandaff and the Church of Ireland Theological Institute. After a curacy at Holyhead he was the Incumbent at Bodedern from 1974 to 1988; and at Machynlleth from 1988 to 2010.

Church in Wales titles
Preceded by Arfon Williams	Archdeacon of Wrexham; 2004–2010	Succeeded by Andrew Jones
