= Greal y Corau =

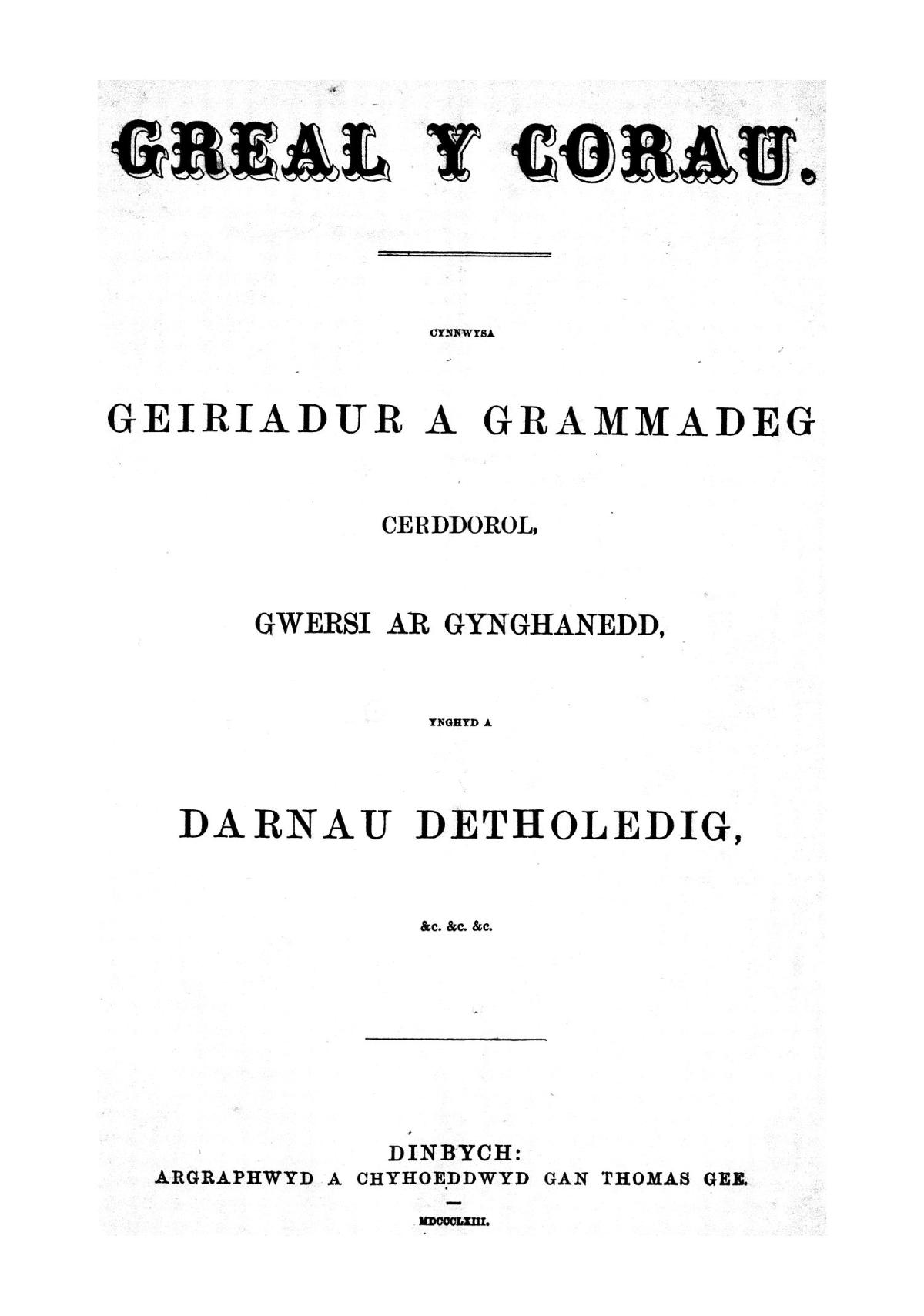
Greal y Corau (Welsh journal)

Greal y Corau was a 19th-century Welsh language periodical, first published for the Welsh Choral Union, by Thomas Gee, in Denbigh, in 1861. Its editors included journalist Lewis William Lewis (Llew Llwyfo, 1831-1901) and musician Edward Stephen (née Jones) (Tanymarian, 1822-1885). It contained articles about music and musicians, and music festivals. Many popular Welsh musicians and poets of the 19th Century, such as John Owen published regularly in this popular periodical.
