= Henry Morgan (priest) =

The Ven. Harry John Morgan (16 November 1871 – 30 October 1947) was the Archdeacon of Bangor from 1937 to 1947.

Morgan was educated at Christ College, Brecon, and Brasenose College, Oxford. He served curacies at Llanfairpwllgwyngyll and Beaumaris, then incumbencies at Barmouth and Llandegfan. He was a Canon Residentiary at Bangor Cathedral from 1930 until his death and its Chancellor from 1934.

Church in Wales titles
Preceded by Owen Evans	Archdeacon of Bangor; 1937–1947	Succeeded by Richard Hughes
