= Pembroke School =

Pembroke School may refer to:

- Pembroke School, Adelaide, a school in Adelaide, South Australia
- Pembroke School, Wales, a school in Pembrokeshire
- Pembroke School, New Zealand, a school in Pembroke, New Zealand

== See also ==
- Pembroke College (disambiguation)
