= 2007 Barbarians end of season tour =

Summary
P	W	D	L
Total
2	2	0	0
Test match
2	2	0	0
Opponent
P	W	D	L
Tunisia
1	1	0	0
Spain
1	1	0	0

The 2007 Barbarians rugby union tour was a series of matches played in May 2007 in by Barbarians F.C. They played for the first time against Spain and Georgia.

== Results ==
19 May 2007

Tunisia	10–33	Barbarians
	report

Stade El Menzah, Tunis
Attendance: 6,000
Referee: Dave Pearson (England)

23 May 2007

Spain	26–52	Barbarians
	report

Estadio Manuel Martínez Valero, Elche
Attendance: 5,000
Referee: Dave Pearson (England)

== Squad ==
- Coach: (New Zealand) Zinzan Brooke

=== Backs ===
- (England) Matt Cornwell – Leicester Tigers
- (Ireland) Guy Easterby – Leinster
- (Ireland) Tyrone Howe – Banbridge
- (Scotland) Garry Law – Border Reivers
- (Ireland) Kevin Maggs – Ulster
- (Wales) Nick Macleod – Cardiff Blues
- (Scotland) Stuart Moffat – Border Reivers
- (England) Lee Robinson – Bristol
- (Wales) Nicky Robinson – Cardiff Blues
- (Wales) Clive Stuart-Smith – Llanelli Scarlets
- (Wales) Rhys Williams – Cardiff Blues

=== Forwards ===
- (England) Andy Dalgleish – Oxford University
- (Wales) John Davies – Cardiff Blues
- (Ireland) Justin Fitzpatrick – Ulster
- (Wales) Jason Forster Doncaster Knights
- (Wales) Cai Griffiths – Ospreys
- (Wales) Jonathan Mills – London Welsh
- (England) James Hayter – Harlequins
- (England) Ollie Hodge – Exeter
- (England) Craig Hammond – Nottingham
- (England) Tom Johnson – Coventry
- (South Africa) Hottie Louw – Bath
- (England) Simon Miall – Harlequins
- (England) Hugh Vyvyan (capt.) – Saracens
- (Wales) Dorian Williams – London Welsh
