= Talybont, Bangor =

Coordinates: 53.220°N 4.102°W

Talybont
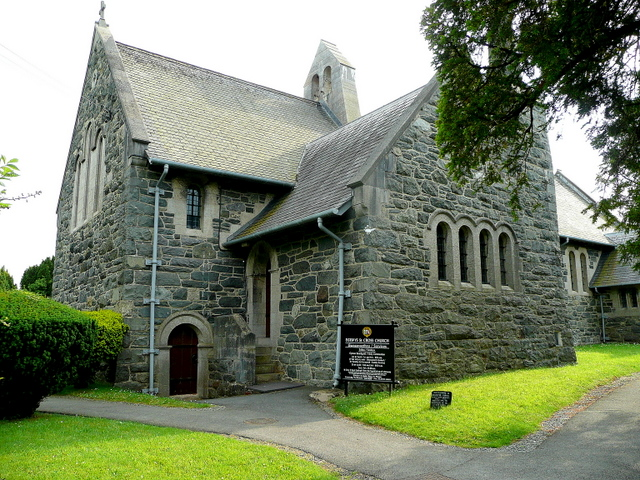
- St. Cross church, Talybont

- Location within Gwynedd
- Population: 465
- OS grid reference: SH606707
- Community: Llanllechid
- Principal area: Gwynedd
- Preserved county: Gwynedd
- Country: Wales
- Sovereign state: United Kingdom
- Post town: BANGOR
- Postcode district: LL57
- Dialling code: 01248
- Police: North Wales
- Fire: North Wales
- Ambulance: Welsh
- UK Parliament: Bangor Aberconwy
- Senedd Cymru – Welsh Parliament: Arfon

Talybont (also spelled Tal-y-bont), is a small village to the southeast of the city of Bangor in Gwynedd, north Wales, in the community of Llanllechid, and next to Llandygai. It had a population of 465 as of 2011.
