= Thomas Runcorn =

Welsh Anglican priest

Thoms Runcorn was a Welsh Anglican priest in the 16th century.

Gwynn was educated at the University of Oxford. He held livings at Bowden, Cheshire, Llanrhaiadr, (Note: The source says "Llanrhaiadr, co. Denbigh". That could refer to either Llanrhaeadr-ym-Mochnant or Llanrhaeadr-yng-Nghinmeirch.) Bebington and Weaverham. Runcorn was Archdeacon of Bangor from 1525 until his death in 1556.
