= Richard Gwynn =

Welsh Anglican priest

Richard Gwynn was a Welsh Anglican priest in the 17th century.

Gwynn was educated at University College, Oxford. He held livings at Trawsfynydd, Llanfwrog and Llantrissaint. Gwynn was Archdeacon of Bangor from 1613 until his death on 9 September 1617.
