= Edmund Meyrick (archdeacon of Bangor) =

Welsh Anglican priest

Edmund Meyrick was a Welsh Anglican priest in the 16th century.

Meyrick was educated at the University of Oxford. He held the living at Corwen. He was appointed Archdeacon of Bangor in 1559. Meyrick is also recorded as the Chancellor of St. Asaph, and Canon of Lichfield.

Edmund was born at Bala and educated there before going up to Jesus College, Oxford. He read Latin and Greek before being awarded a BA on 9 February 1554-5. His brother Rowland had also attended Oxford. He remained a committed catholic through the Marian counter-reformation gaining a Bachelor of Civil Laws (BCL) at the Elizabethan succession. Jesus had a long tradition of educating priests sending Meyrick back to Wales to enter the church hierarchy at Bangor where he was made archdeacon. Already a canon of Lichfield he was created Chancellor of St Asaph’s diocese in 1559. In addition he was granted the sinecure of the rectorship of Corwen, Merionethshire. Meyrick became motivated by education for the poor in the county. Its possible that he had a son Rowland born in c 1570, who also attended Jesus. On 14 July 1567 he was awarded a DCL by Jesus.
