= Hugh Arfon Evans =

Welsh Anglican priest (1913–1995)

Hugh Arfon Evans (1913–1995) was a Welsh, Anglican priest.

Evans was educated at St David's College, Lampeter and St Michael's College, Llandaff. He was ordained deacon in 1936 and priest in 1937. He was Vicar of Llanfair-is-gaer from 1952 to 1973; and Treasurer of Bangor Cathedral from 1966 to 1973. He was Archdeacon of Bangor from 1973 to 1983.

Church in Wales titles
Preceded by Evan Gilbert Wright	Archdeacon of Bangor; 1973–1983	Succeeded by Thomas Bayley Hughes
