= Mary Stallard =

British Anglican bishop

The Right Reverend Mary Stallard
- Bishop of Llandaff
- Diocese: Diocese of Llandaff
- In office: 2023–present
- Other posts: Archdeacon of Bangor (2018–2023); Assistant Bishop of Bangor (2022–2023)

Orders
- Ordination: 1993 (deacon); 1997 (priest) by Rowan Williams
- Consecration: 26 February 2022 by Andrew John

Personal details
- Born: Mary Kathleen Rose Stallard; 28 February 1967 (age 59)
- Denomination: Anglicanism
- Education: Selwyn College, Cambridge, and The Queen's Foundation,

Mary Kathleen Rose Stallard (born 28 February 1967) is an Anglican bishop serving as the Bishop of Llandaff; she previously served as Archdeacon of Bangor and Assistant Bishop of Bangor.

== Early life and education ==
Stallard was born on 28 February 1967 in Birmingham, West Midlands, England. Her father was a vicar and her mother a scientist. She was educated at King Edward VI High School for Girls, an all-girls independent school in Birmingham. She studied theology at Selwyn College, Cambridge, graduating with a Bachelor of Arts (BA) degree in 1988. She worked as a high school religious education teacher, and completed a Postgraduate Certificate in Education (PGCE) teaching qualification with the London Institute of Education in 1990.

== Ordained ministry ==
From 1991 to 1993, she trained for ordained ministry at The Queen's Foundation, an ecumenical theological college in Birmingham. She was made a deacon in the Church in Wales, at Petertide 1993 (26 June), by Rowan Williams, Bishop of Monmouth, at Newport Cathedral. From 1993 to 1996, she served her curacy at St Matthew's Church, Newport in the Diocese of Monmouth. Next, she was incumbent at Ysbyty Cynfyn, first as deacon-in-charge (1996–1997) and then as vicar (1997–2002). She was ordained as a priest in 1997, the first year the Church in Wales ordained women to the priesthood. She was a Canon residentiary at St Asaph Cathedral from 2003 to 2011; and school chaplain at St Joseph's School, Wrexham from 2011 until 2018 and her appointment as Archdeacon. She was collated archdeacon on 6 May 2018.

=== Episcopal ministry ===
On 26 January 2022, it was announced that Stallard had been appointed Assistant Bishop of Bangor to assist Andy John in his diocesan duties while he also serves as Archbishop of Wales; she was consecrated a bishop by John on 26 February 2022 at Bangor Cathedral. She remained Archdeacon of Bangor.

On 19 January 2023, it was announced that Stallard had been elected that day by the electoral college of the Church in Wales at Llandaff Cathedral to become the next diocesan Bishop of Llandaff. She legally took up her see (thereby ending her assistant bishop post and archdeaconry) as of the sacred synod to confirm her election; which occurred on 19 April 2023 at Holy Trinity, Llandudno.

In 2025, she was selected as the Anglican Communion representative for the Europe region on the Crown Nominations Commission to elect the next Archbishop of Canterbury.

Church in Wales titles
Preceded by Paul Davies	Archdeacon of Bangor; 2018–2023	TBA
Preceded by June Osborne	Bishop of Llandaff; 2023–present	Incumbent
