= John Jones (archdeacon of Merioneth) =

Welsh Anglican priest and writer

John Jones (1775 – 13 May 1834) was a Welsh Anglican priest and writer.

== Life ==
Jones, who was baptised on 28 December 1775, was the son of Roger Jones of Cefn Rug near Corwen, and his wife, Elizabeth (maiden name Pierce). He was educated at Ruthin School and Jesus College, Oxford, obtaining a BA degree in 1798 and a Master of Arts in 1802. He was ordained as a deacon in the Church of England in 1799, and as a priest in 1800 by the Bishop of Bangor, William Cleaver. After serving as curate of Gyffylliog, he became junior vicar of Bangor in 1802. He was a founder member and the secretary of a group of clergy in the diocese of Bangor that published tracts in Welsh; Jones himself wrote in Welsh on various theological topics. He became the rector of Llandudno and archdeacon of Merioneth in 1809 and senior vicar of Bangor in 1810. He was also appointed to the parishes of Edern and Llanbedr-Dyffryn-Clwyd in 1819. In 1821, he was the Bampton Lecturer at the University of Oxford, speaking on the topic of "The Moral Tendency in the Divine Revelation". He died on 13 May 1834 and was buried at Llanbedr Dyffryn Clwyd.
