= John Rhys Davies (priest) =

Welsh Anglican priest (1890–1953)

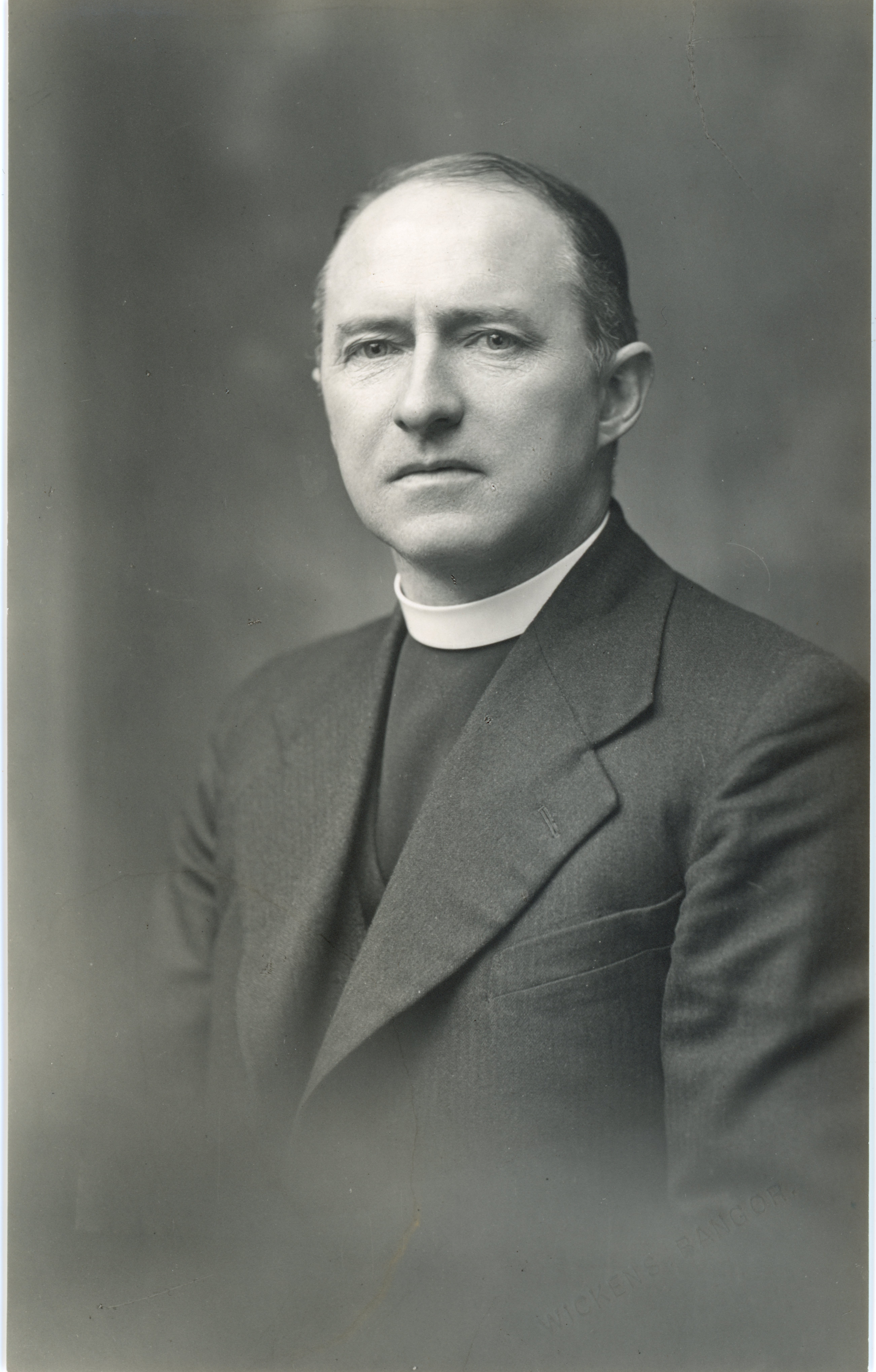
Rhys Davies in 1953

John Rhys Davies (born John Rees Davies; 11 November 1890 – 27 January 1953) was a Welsh Anglican priest of the Church in Wales, he served as Archdeacon of Merioneth from 1952 until his sudden death in January 1953.

== Life ==
John Rees Davies was born on 11 November 1890 in Llandisilio, Cardiganshire, the second child of Rev. Thomas Rees Davies and Elizabeth, née Williams. He was educated at Jesus College, Oxford and St David's College, Lampeter. During his time at Oxford Davies was a member of the Cambrian Society and 21s Society. He was ordained as a Deacon in March 1914 and then served temporarily as chaplain to the Forces from 1917 to 1919 during World War I. Some time after the war, he changed his middle name from Rees to Rhys, possibly after the principal of Jesus College Sir John Rhys. Between 1925 and 1932, he was rector of Llangranog and from 1932 to 1937 of Llangefni and Tregaian. He then served as vicar of St James' Church, Bangor, until 1952. During this time, in 1941, he was appointed a canon of Bangor Cathedral. He was then appointed Archdeacon of Merioneth in March 1952 by the Bishop of Bangor, John Jones, after the resignation of former Archdeacon David Jenkins. He died on 27 January 1953, aged 62, at his home The Vicarage in Arthog.

== Family ==
Davies was born into a family of famous Welsh clergymen, including his father Rev. Thomas Rees Davies, who served as vicar of Llanfihangel-y-Creuddyn, and his Great-Grandfather Rev. Evan Jones of Crugybar. His uncle, John Davies Williams, was the Town Clerk of Southport who married the younger sister of the Liberal politician, Sir Joseph Leese.
