= Pembroke College =

Pembroke College may refer to:

- Pembroke College, Cambridge
- Pembroke College, Oxford
- Pembroke College, Brown University, the former women's college
- University of North Carolina at Pembroke, formerly known as Pembroke State College

== See also ==
- Pembroke University, fictional setting for Netflix series The Chair, referred to in some sources as Pembroke College
- Pembroke School (disambiguation)
