= Owen Evans (priest) =

Welsh priest and author (1864–1937)

The Ven. (Albert) Owen Evans (20 February 1864 – 22 September 1937) was an Anglican priest and author.

Evans was born on 20 February 1864 and educated at St David's College, Lampeter. He was a curate at Connah's Quay and Diocesan Inspector of Schools for the Diocese of Bangor from 1899 to 1909; Rector of Llanfaethlu from 1909 to 1918; Rural Dean of Talybolion from 1918 to 1921; and Archdeacon of Bangor from 1921 until his death on 22 September 1937.

Church in Wales titles
Preceded by John Morgan	Archdeacon of Bangor; 1921–1937	Succeeded by Henry Morgan
