= Margaret Thomas (hymnwriter) =

Welsh hymnwriter

Margaret Thomas (born 1779) was a Welsh hymnwriter.

== Biography ==
She was born in 1779 in Llanllechid, Caernarfonshire, Wales; her father was William Llwyd. She wrote hymns in the flyleaves (blank pages) of her Bible and other books. None of her hymns were published during her lifetime. Pastor Thomas Levi discovered her verses and published them in the magazine Y Traethodydd in 1904. The hymn Dyma Feibil annwyl Iesu (This is Jesus’ Precious Bible) has been attributed to her given that it was written in her handwriting in one of her books, but the attribution is uncertain because Thomas sometimes copied down hymns from other sources. Thomas's hymns have been described as "powerful and by no means conventionally feminine".

Thomas was married twice, first to Edmund Williams and then, around 1817, to Edward Thomas. Her second husband was an elder at Gatehouse Chapel (Calvinistic Methodist) in Llanllechid, founded in 1799. Thomas "was masterful in her manner" and often helped visiting preachers to learn social graces and manners.
