= Kusha Petts =

British artist (1921–2003)

- Born: Marjory Helen Miller; 1921; London, England
- Died: 2003 (aged 81–82)
- Education: University of Reading
- Known for: Painting, ceramics, writing
- Spouse: John Petts m.1947, divorced 1984

Marjory Helen Petts née Miller (1921–2003) was a British artist and writer who, although born in London, spent the majority of her career in Wales.

== Biography ==
Petts was born in London and studied fine art at the University of Reading between 1939 and 1944 and then taught in Chesterfield for a year before returning to London to teach at St Paul's Girls' School until 1947. That year she married the artist John Petts. The couple eventually divorced in 1984 during which time, living in Wales, they had three children together and Kusha worked as Petts's studio assistant on a number of mosaic and stained glass compositions. Petts also produced her own paintings, often portraits, still lifes and landscapes. Petts exhibited these works in a number of group exhibitions including at commercial galleries in Cardiff, at the National Eisteddfod of Wales in 1956, at the National Museum of Wales in both 1956 and 1957 and with the Society for Education in Art. Solo exhibitions at Thomson House in Cardiff during 1965 and in Carmarthen and Abergavenny in the 1990s followed.

In 1967 Petts began to concentrate on her writing and in 1970 her novel Necklace for a Poor Sod was published. She also contributed short stories to anthologies of works by Welsh authors and throughout the 1980s her poems and short stories were featured by the BBC on both Radio 2 and Radio 4. Several of her poems related to her time in Swansea during the Second World War and to the treatment her uncle received as a conscientious objector. For many years Petts lived at Llansteffan in west Wales and the Carmarthenshire County Museum holds examples of her paintings.
