= Maurice Glynne =

Welsh Anglican priest

Maurice Glynne was a Welsh Anglican priest in the 16th century.

Maurice was educated at the University of Oxford. He was Archdeacon of Bangor from 1504 until his death in 1525. Glynne was appointed an advocate of Doctors' Commons on 21 July 1517.
