= Andrew Jones (priest) =

Church in Wales priest (born 1961)

Andrew Carroll Jones (born May 1961) is a Church in Wales priest who served as Archdeacon of Merioneth from 2010 until 2023.

Jones was educated at Bangor University (North Wales) and the Church of Ireland Theological Institute. He was a Minor Canon at Bangor Cathedral from 1985 to 1988. He was the Incumbent at Dolgellau from 1988 to 1992; and a Lecturer at St Michael's College, Llandaff from 1992 to 1996. He was Rector of Llanbedrog from 1996 until 2012. He resigned his archdeaconry in March or 24 February 2023; but there was no public announcement or acknowledgment.

While working at St Michael's College, he was convicted of "importuning for immoral purposes" (Section 32, Sexual Offences Act 1956; i.e. gay cruising) and given a 12-month conditional discharge.
