= William Mostyn (priest) =

Welsh Anglican priest

William Mostyn was a 17th-century Welsh Anglican priest.

The son of Sir Roger Mostyn, M.P., he was born in Flintshire and educated at Queens' College, Cambridge. He became a Fellow of St John's College, Cambridge in 1625; and was incorporated at Oxford in 1639. He became Archdeacon of Bangor in 1633, Rector of Christleton in 1634 and Vicar of Whitford, Flintshire in 1639.

He died c. 1669/1670 at Plâs Mostyn, Wrexham.
