= Dominic Day =

Wales international rugby union player

- Full name: Dominic Day
- Born: 22 August 1985 (age 41) Haverfordwest, Wales
- Height: 1.98 m (6 ft 6 in)
- Weight: 116 kg (18 st 4 lb)
- School: Pembroke
- University: UWIC

Rugby union career
- Position: Lock
- Current team: Saracens
Youth career
- Pembroke
Senior career
Years	Team	Apps	(Points)
2006–2011	Llanelli RFC	68	(30)
2011	Llandovery RFC	1	(0)
2006–2012	Scarlets	92	(20)
2012–2016	Bath	110	(25)
2016–2017	Toyota Verblitz	9	(5)
2017	Melbourne Rebels	6	(0)
2017–2019	Saracens	34	(0)
International career
Years	Team	Apps	(Points)
2004	Wales U19	10	(0)
2005–2006	Wales U21	15	(5)
2015	Wales	3	(0)
- Correct as of 20 September 2015

Dominic Day (born 22 August 1985) is a Welsh rugby union player.

== Early life ==
Born in Haverfordwest, Day grew up in Lamphey, two miles east of Pembroke. He attended Pembroke School, where he participated in track and field, competing for Wales Schools as a discus thrower.

== Rugby playing career ==
Day played rugby union at the age of eight, and at the age of 15 starting as a Number 8 before being moved to the second row. The PE teacher at Pembroke School, Neil Truman, recommended Day for the Pembrokeshire 'Elite' squad, and at the age of 18, he was invited to join the Scarlets' academy. Around the same time, he applied to the University of Wales Institute, Cardiff (UWIC) to study for a degree in sports science. In his first year there, he played for the university rugby team, then Scarlets feeder club Carmarthen Quins RFC in his second year, before joining Llanelli RFC for the 2005–06 season in his final year. He made his debut on 21 January 2006, coming on as a replacement in a 19–16 defeat to Pontypool RFC.

Day made his regional debut for the Scarlets against Northampton Saints on 11 August 2006 in a pre-season friendly ahead of the 2006–07 season. That year, he became a regular in the second row for Llanelli, and scored his first senior try in another friendly against Pembroke Dock Quins RFC on 16 August. A second try followed on 27 January 2007, as Day scored the 10th of 13 tries in an 85–7 win over Seven Sisters RFC in the WRU Challenge Cup. Day made 27 appearances in total in 2006–07 as Llanelli finished fifth in the Welsh Premier Division.

As well as retaining his place in the Llanelli side, Day also made his competitive debut for the Scarlets in 2007–08. After featuring in both pre-season friendlies against Exeter Chiefs and Bath, Day was named in the starting line-up for the league season opener at home to the Newport Gwent Dragons; however, he was substituted at half-time as the Scarlets lost 30–23 and he did not play again for the region until January 2008, coming on for Adam Eustace in the 66th minute of a 40–7 away defeat to London Wasps in the Heineken Cup. He made two more substitute appearances for the Scarlets that season, as well as a further 24 for Llanelli.

Day started the 2008–09 season with Llanelli, but by October 2008, he had become a regular fixture in the Scarlets side; his last Llanelli game of the season came on 15 November 2008 against Cardiff RFC in a 32–3 home win. After 24 appearances for the regional side in 2008–09, Day capped the season first with a three-year contract extension in March 2009 and then a try in each of the final two games – away to the Cardiff Blues and at home to Ulster – his first tries in regional rugby. The 2009–10 season was much the same for Day, as he consolidated his place in the Scarlets starting line-up, playing in 24 of a possible 29 matches.

He started the 2010–11 season as the regular partner for Lou Reed in the Scarlets second row, and scored his first Heineken Cup try on 18 December 2010 in a 38–15 away win over Benetton Treviso; however, a shoulder injury suffered in the Scarlets' 34–7 defeat to Saracens on 29 January 2011 ruled Day out of contention for two months. He made his comeback for Llanelli in a 46–40 defeat away to Pontypool on 19 March, before making his regional comeback on 22 April in the Scarlets' 37–29 away win over Glasgow Warriors, which secured the Welsh side's qualification for the 2011–12 Heineken Cup.

Day regained his starting place in 2011–12, making 26 appearances. However, with the announcement of the introduction of a salary cap into Welsh regional rugby for 2012–13, the Scarlets elected not to extend Day's contract, and in February 2012, he signed a three-year deal to move to English team Bath at the end of the 2011–12 season. His time at the Scarlets ended on a high note as he scored the team's fourth try in a 26–14 away win over the Cardiff Blues on 24 March 2012.

At international level, Day played has played for Wales at under-19, under-21 and Senior levels. In 2004, he played in the U19 World Championships in South Africa, and earned 10 caps overall for the under-19s. The following year, he also participated in the U21 World Championships in Argentina before being selected for the same tournament in France in 2006. In total, he earned 15 caps for the under-21s. In June 2015, Day was named in Wales' initial training squad for the World Cup later in the year. Day made his full international debut aged 29 in the starting line-up for Wales against Ireland on 8 August 2015. In January 2016, Day was named in the Wales squad for the Six Nations Championship.

Despite offers to sign from France, Wales and Bath, Day signed a contract to play for one season with Toyota Verblitz in the top division of Japanese Rugby. His contract to begin in June 2016. In January 2017 he signed to play for Melbourne Rebels for a season. At the conclusion of the Rebels season he signed to play for Saracens in the English Premiership. After nearly three seasons with Saracens, a recurring knee injury forced Day to retire from professional rugby in November 2019.

== Super Rugby statistics ==
As of 6 November 2017

Season	Team	Games	Starts	Sub	Mins	Tries	Cons	Pens	Drops	Points	Yel	Red
2017	Melbourne Rebels	5	3	2	297	0	0	0	0	0	0	0
Total		5	3	2	297	0	0	0	0	0	0	0
