= Michael Crotty =

Michael Paul Crotty
- Born: 14 April 1941 (age 85)
- Military career
- Allegiance: United Kingdom
- Branch: Royal Air Force
- Service years: 1962–95
- Rank: Air Commodore
- Awards: Commander of the Order of the British Empire
- Other work: Director at Lucas Aerospace

Air Commodore Michael Paul Crotty, CBE., F.C.I.L.T, M.C.I.P.S, (born 14 April 1941) usually referred to as Paul Crotty, is a retired senior Royal Air Force Commander and Aerospace director.

== RAF career ==
Educated at Pembroke Grammar from 1952 to 1959 and following a 2(1) degree in Modern History and Politics from the University of Wales (Swansea), Crotty joined the Royal Air Force in 1962 and trained at RAF Jurby and RAF Kirton in Lindsey.

Crotty was stationed in Singapore from 1963 to 1965, also spending 6 months at RAF Kuching in North Borneo In 1966 he moved to RAF Finningley before moving to HQ Bomber Command at RAF High Wycombe in 1968.

From 1970 to 1973 Crotty commanded his own squadron at RAF Honington after being promoted from Flight Lieutenant to Squadron Leader

Crotty then took a sabbatical after being chosen to attend Manchester University, gaining an MSc.

In 1976 Crotty was appointed as Depot Project Officer at No. 7 Maintenance Unit RAF, RAF Quedgeley. Next Crotty was selected to attend RAF Staff College, Bracknell to complete a one-year course. Following this, Crotty was promoted to Wing Commander, aged 36 at RAF Harrogate, where he served as a Director of Supply Management. In 1979, Crotty moved to Rome to attend the NATO Defense College and was then appointed to NATO HQ in Holland working with the Allied Air Forces Central Europe from 1980 to 1982.

Crotty returned to MOD London in 1983 and was responsible for aviation fuel supplies for the Falklands War and in 1984 was promoted to Group Captain, becoming Station Commander of RAF Stafford, with 1,500 civilians and 1,000 airmen under his command. He was then selected to attend a one-year course at the Royal College of Defence Studies.

Crotty was promoted to Air Commodore in 1988 at RAF Harrogate with 2,000 procurement staff and later, in 1990, moved to RAF Strike Command having been appointed Assistant Chief of Staff (Logistics) for the First Gulf War. Following this, in 1993 Crotty was appointed Director of Logistics Operations at Whitehall (MOD (Air) London) where he had special responsibilities as the Director of Air Movements. During this time Crotty also served as President of the Royal Air Force Association Wales for 7 years.

Following his retirement from the Royal Air Force in 1995, Crotty joined Lucas Aerospace as Director of the London office. He was also awarded a CBE in the 1996 New Year Honours
