= Wallis Thomas =

Welsh Anglican priest (1906–2001)

Wallis Huw Wallis Thomas (10 March 1906 – 2001) was a Church in Wales priest who, at the time of his death, was the oldest working priest in Britain. He was Archdeacon of Merioneth from 1959 to 1976, but was still thought of as the Archdeacon long after his retirement, and was generally known as "the Arch".

== Life ==
Thomas was born in Llanrwst, Wales and educated at Pwllheli grammar school, University College, Bangor and the University of Strasbourg (studying French at both) before moving to Jesus College, Oxford (where he studied theology). He was ordained and began his ministry in Bangor, Gwynedd in 1931, initially as a deacon before becoming a priest in 1932. Although his first language was Welsh, he generally preached in English, and was highly respected as a preacher. He was also a keen visitor to parishioners. After a period as a minor canon of Bangor Cathedral from 1935 to 1938, he was secretary and chaplain to the Archbishop of Wales before becoming Rector of Barmouth in 1946 and then vicar of Llanelltyd (a village near Dolgellau) in 1966, before retiring in 1976. He was Archdeacon of Merioneth from 1959 to 1976 and was generally known as "the Arch" even after his retirement. His successors as Archdeacon, including Barry Morgan (later Bishop of Llandaff and Archbishop of Wales) and Carl Cooper (later Bishop of St Davids), were left in no doubt by parishioners that Thomas was still the real Archdeacon as far as they were concerned. He continued to preach and lead services, in Dolgellau and in Llanelltyd, until well after his 90th birthday, sometimes playing the organ as well. He was described as the oldest working priest in Britain. He attributed the fact that he rose no higher than Archdeacon to his working-class background and his unmarried status.

He was regarded as a fine speaker and raconteur, and a man of great charm, with a worldwide circle of friends; his female admirers were sometimes nicknamed the "Wallis Collection". He played several sports to a high standard, playing football for Oxford, representing north Wales at cricket in 1954, playing tennis for his county and acting as a reserve for the Welsh hockey team. He was president of the Merioneth district of the Royal Society for the Prevention of Cruelty to Animals from 1959 onwards.
