= Robert White (priest) =

English Anglican priest

Robert White was an English Anglican priest in the 17th century.

Stokes was educated Sidney Sussex College, Cambridge and incorporated at Oxford in 1606. He became Archdeacon of Merioneth in 1623 and Archdeacon of Norfolk in 1631.
