= Thomas Bayley Hughes =

Welsh Anglican priest (1916–1988)

Thomas Bayley Hughes (1916-1988) was a Welsh Anglican priest.

Hughes was educated at the University of Wales and St Michael's College, Llandaff. He was ordained deacon in 1941 and priest in 1942. After curacies at Llanrug and Llanberis he held incumbencies in Llangwnnadl, Llanllechid and Llangefni. He was Archdeacon of Bangor from 1983 to 1986.

Church in Wales titles
Preceded by Hugh Arfon Evans	Archdeacon of Bangor; 1983–1986	Succeeded by Elwyn Roberts
