= James Bater =

Wales international rugby union footballer

- Born: James Bater; 7 January 1980 (age 46) Bridgend, Wales
- Height: 1.93 m (6 ft 4 in)
- Weight: 103 kg (16 st 3 lb)
- School: Brynteg Comprehensive

Rugby union career
- Position: Flanker
- Current team: Llanelli Scarlets
Senior career
Years	Team	Apps	(Points)
1998–2003	Swansea	46	(5)
2003–2006	Ospreys	67	(30)
2006–2009	Llanelli Scarlets	42	(20)
- Correct as of 20:29, 15 March 2009 (UTC)
International career
Years	Team	Apps	(Points)
2003–	Wales	1	(0)
- Correct as of 13 February 2008

James Bater (born 7 January 1980) is a Welsh former rugby union footballer who played as a flanker at club level for Swansea RFC, and in the Celtic League for the Ospreys and the Scarlets.

Born in Bridgend, Bater began his professional rugby career at Swansea RFC, before moving to the Ospreys at the team's inception at the dawn of regional rugby in Wales. In his three years at the Ospreys, Bater made a total of 67 appearances, scoring six tries. However, due to the rise of future Wales captain Ryan Jones and the signings of Filo Tiatia and Jono Gibbes, Bater found himself on the fringes of the first team at the Ospreys. The Scarlets came in with a bid for him, and he was allowed to leave. Bater has managed to make a place for himself in the Scarlets side, and has even captained the team when regular captain, Simon Easterby, and vice-captain, Stephen Jones, are on international duty.

In March 2009 it was announced that Bater had been forced to retire due to a neck injury and hoped to return to dentistry. Bater resumed his career in dentistry and is now the Principal Dentist at uSmile dental practice in Porthcawl, Wales.

He attained his only international cap as a replacement against Romania on 27 August 2003.
