= RAF Harrogate =

Former Royal Air Force base in Yorkshire, England

RAF Harrogate
- Harrogate, North Yorkshire in England

Site information
- Type: RAF administrative station
- Owner: Ministry of Defence
- Operator: Air Ministry; Royal Air Force; Ministry of Defence
- Condition: Closed

Location
- Location in North Yorkshire
- Coordinates: 53°58′43.6″N 1°32′34.8″W

Site history
- Built: 1940
- In use: 1940–1994
- Fate: Sold, buildings demolished and site redeveloped for housing.

Royal Air Force Harrogate or RAF Harrogate, sometimes known as Ministry of Defence (MoD) Harrogate, was the name for two distinct Royal Air Force establishments within the town of Harrogate, North Yorkshire, England. The main site was at St George's in the south-west of the town and was home to a medical training establishment (MTE), supply branch and Women's Auxiliary Air Force (WAAF) training centre. The site was demolished in 1994. The term RAF Harrogate was also applied to the requisition of several hotels in Harrogate town centre which acted as a No. 7 Personnel Reception Centre during World War II. This should not be confused with RAF Menwith Hill, a current RAF base near Harrogate.

== History ==
The Air Ministry Unit was situated on St George's Road in Harrogate and consisted of non-flying training, a medical training establishment (MTE) and also functioned as a logistics base. During the Second World War, the unit's main role was to carry out recruit training for the Women's Auxiliary Air Force and also provide a headquarters (and clerical site) for No. 7 Personnel Reception Centre (No. 7 PRC) which processed mostly aircrew returning from overseas during the Second World War (especially after training courses). Other reception centres were also being activated at this time (Brighton, Heaton Park, Bournemouth and many others) with some being solely for Dominion or RAAF crews, which left No.7 PRC as a processing centre only for Royal Air Force crews.

Many of the staff rotating through No. 7 PRC were billeted in the hotels in the centre of Harrogate. The hotels were requisitioned by the Air Ministry in anticipation of London being bombed in the early days of the Second World War. This cluster of Hotels were also commonly referred to as RAF Harrogate by the aircrew and local people. One of the largest contingents was over 700 aircrew billeted at The Queen Hotel in Harrogate, which was handed back in 1946 (the Crown Hotel in Harrogate was not de-requisitioned for war purposes until 1958).

WAAF recruit training would be held at RAF Harrogate between May 1940 and August 1941. It was named just WAAF Depot until January 1941 when it was renamed No. 1 WAAF Depot. WAAF recruits were also billeted in hotels in the town and were drilled outside the hotels rather than back at the headquarters site. Recruit training intakes officially ended in May 1941, and training was transferred to RAF Bridgnorth in Shropshire, but training there did not come on stream officially until September of the same year.

After the Second World War, No.7 PRC Moved to Market Harborough in Leicestershire in December 1945. The medical training establishment continued to 1946 and the rest of the site continued as part of the supply chain under various names (RAF Harrogate, MoD Harrogate, Support Management Group) but was most often referred to as MoD Harrogate with a name change to RAF Harrogate in 1992 when its responsibility was being wound down and staff and processes were being transferred to RAF Wyton in Cambridgeshire. At the time of its closure, RAF Harrogate had over 1,200 civilian staff and over 300 military staff working at the site. The responsibilities of RAF Harrogate were transferred to the new Support Command at RAF Brampton on 1 April 1994.

== Notable people ==
The list below contains details of those well-known people who were posted to, or dealt with by RAF Harrogate.

- Sir Michael Beetham - longest serving Chief of the Air Staff of the RAF, attended No. 7 PRC in 1943 after flying training in America
- John Haynes - creator of the Haynes Manuals diagrammatic books. Haynes was posted to RAF Harrogate as a supply officer after serving at RAF Aden, where he had undertaken his first strip down and photographic process.
- Air-Vice Marshal Johnnie Johnson - was in command at MoD/RAF Harrogate in the 1960s
- Noor Inayat Khan - went through her WAAF training at RAF Harrogate before being posted to Balloon Command
