= Clive Stuart-Smith =

English rugby union player (born 1983)

- Born: Clive James Stuart-Smith; 17 May 1983 (age 43) Gloucester, England
- Height: 175 cm (5 ft 9 in)
- Weight: 81 kg (12 st 11 lb; 179 lb)

Rugby union career
- Position: Scrum-half
Amateur team(s)
Years	Team	Apps	(Points)
2010-2012	Esher RFC		
- Hartpury RFC
2013-	Cinderford RFC		
Senior career
Years	Team	Apps	(Points)
2001–2003	Gloucester RFC		
2003–2004	Leeds Tykes		
2004–2005	Worcester	11	
2005-2007	Llanelli Scarlets		
2007-2010	Exeter Chiefs		

Clive James Stuart-Smith (born 17 May 1983) is an English rugby union player who plays at scrum-half. Stuart-Smith played club rugby for Gloucester RFC, Leeds Tykes, Worcester Warriors, Exeter Chiefs and Esher RFC in the English leagues as well as representing Welsh region Llanelli Scarlets. Stuart-Smith played age grade rugby for England at under 18, under 19 and under 21 level, as well as representing England Saxons, England's second national rugby union team.

== Club career ==
In May 2001, Clive Stuart-Smith joined Gloucester RFC on a two-year contract. Whilst at Gloucester he was a replacement in the 2003 Powergen Cup Final in which Gloucester defeated Northampton Saints. In June 2003, it was announced that Stuart-Smith would be joining Leeds Tykes from Gloucester, agreeing a one-year contract with the club. At the end of the season, Stuart-Smith moved again to Worcester for the 2004–05 season.

Stuart-Smith moved to the Llanelli Scarlets for the 2005–06 season, signing a two-year contract with the region. While at the region, Stuart-Smith played in the 2006 Powergen Cup final loss against London Wasps. At the end of his two-year contract, Stuart-Smith left to join Exeter Chiefs, who were playing in National Division One at the time. Despite missing out on promotion to the Premiership, Stuart-Smith committed to Exeter in April 2009 for another season in the now renamed RFU Championship. Exeter won the 2010 RFU Championship final to win promotion to the Aviva Premiership the following season.

Stuart-Smith signed for Esher for the 2010/11 season, who had newly been promoted to the RFU Championship. A cruciate ligament injury sustained in the match against Birmingham in October 2010 saw him unable to play for the rest of the season. He renewed his contract at Esher for the 2011–12 season.

Stuart-Smith joined Cinderford RFC in 2013 after a spell at Hartpury RFC. He is currently a head coach at the club.

== International career ==
Stuart-Smith captained the England Under-19 team. He was also a member of the England Under-21 squad for the 2003 Under 21 Rugby World Championship. England head coach Clive Woodward suggested Stuart-Smith would feature in the England national squad for their 2004 Summer tour; however, he was not announced as part of the team.

Stuart-Smith was a member of the England Saxons squad during the 2006 Churchill Cup campaign, and captained the team in the Plate final match. Stuart-Smith also made three appearances for the invitational Barbarians team, including both matches in the 2007 tour against Tunisia and Spain.

== Personal life ==
Stuart-Smith is the Head of Commercial & Media at Top Marque Sports, a leading Sports Management agency.
