= Edward Stephen =

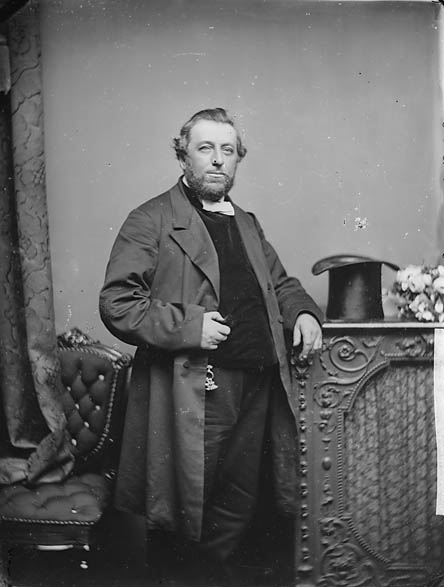
Edward Stephen

Edward Jones Stephen (also Stephens; December 1822 – 10 May 1885), often known by his bardic name of Tanymarian, was a Welsh musician, singer and composer, mainly of hymns and songs.

He was born in Maentwrog, Merionethshire, into a musical family. He went to school at Penralltgoch and was then apprenticed to his brother, William. He began preaching and in 1843 he went to the Congregational college at Bala to train as a minister. While there he changed his name to Edward Stephen to avoid confusion with another Edward Jones. In 1847 he became a minister at Dwygyfylchi in Caernarfonshire and in 1852 he composed an oratorio entitled Ystorm Tiberias. In 1856 he moved to another chapel at Llanllechid, and two years later he composed a requiem in memory of John Jones, Talysarn. He composed many hymns and also wrote books and articles about music, in the Welsh language.

== Musical works ==
=== Anthems ===
- Llawen floeddiwch i Dduw
- Wrth afonydd Babilon
- Disgwyliad Israel

=== Hymn-tunes ===
- Tanymarian

=== Songs ===
- Hen Gadair Freichiau
- Caingc y delyn
- Carlo
