= Archdeacon of Bangor =

The Archdeacon of Bangor is the priest in charge of the archdeaconry of Bangor, an administrative division of the Church in Wales Diocese of Bangor. In 1844, the Archdeaconry of Bangor was combined with the Archdeaconry of Anglesey to form the Archdeaconry of Bangor and Anglesey. The archdeaconry comprises the seven deaneries of Archlechwedd, Arfon, Llifon/Talybolion, Malltraeth, Ogwen, Tyndaethwy and Twrcelyn.

In 2018, the Archdeaconry was separated in diocesan boundary changes, with half becoming the new Archdeaconry of Anglesey, thus recreating the pre-1844 structure.

On 4 June 2023, it was announced that David Parry was to become the next Archdeacon; he was duly collated on 1 October 2023.

== List of archdeacons of Bangor ==
- 1132 Maurice
- 1145 Simon
- 1157 David (II)
- 1166 Alexander Llywelyn
- 1236 Richard (also Bishop of Bangor, 1236)
- 1248 David (II)
- 1284 K.
- 1291 Caducan
- 1324 Griffin Tudor
- 1328 William
- 1345 Ithel ap Cynwraig
- 1345 Elias
- 1367 Gervase ap Madog
- 1394 Robert de Higham
- 1398 Walter de Swaffham
- 1399 Iorweth ap Madog
- 1411 Thomas ap Rhys
- 1412 John de Carnyn
- 1417 Thomas ap Rhys
- 1431–1433 Thomas Banastre
- 1433 John Heygate
- 1436 Thomas Banastre
- 1453 John Parsons
- 1504–1525 Maurice Glynne
- 1525–1556 Thomas Runcorn
- 1556 Edward Gregory
- 1560 Edmund Meyrick
- 1606 Edmund Griffith
- 1613 Richard Gwynn
- 1617 Edward Hughes
- 1633 William Mostyn
- 1669 Held by the Bishop
- 1685 Annexed to the Bishopric

List of the Archdeacons of Bangor and Anglesey since 1844

- 1844-1863: John Jones (deceased)
- 1863-1887: John Wynne Jones
- 1887-1902: John Pryce (afterwards Dean of Bangor, 1902)
- 1902-1920: John Morgan
- 1921-1937: Albert Owen Evans (deceased)
- 1937-1947: Harry Morgan (deceased)
- 1947-1956: Richard Hughes
- 1957-1962: Gwynfryn Richards (afterwards Dean of Bangor, 1962)
- 1962-1973: Gilbert Wright
- 1973-1983: Hugh Arfon Evans
- 1983-1986: Thomas Bayley Hughes
- 1986–1999: Elwyn Roberts
- 2000-2004: Alun Hawkins (afterwards Dean of Bangor, 2005)
- 2005-2011: Meurig Williams
- 2012-2017: Paul Davies
- 6 May 2018 – 19 April 2023 (res.) Mary Stallard (also Assistant Bishop of Bangor from 2022; became Bishop of Llandaff)
- 1 October 2023 – present David Parry

David Allan Parry (born 1962) was collated Archdeacon of Bangor on 1 October 2023. A former social worker, Parry trained for the ministry at Trinity College, Bristol before receiving ordination in the Church of England: he was made deacon at Petertide 1994 (3 July) and ordained priest the following Petertide (2 July 1995) — by Barry Rogerson, Bishop of Bristol, at Bristol Cathedral. His title post (curacy) was Withywood, after which he served 18 years in the Diocese of Liverpool, as incumbent, chaplain, area dean and honorary canon. He moved to Wales in 2016 to lead the new "Bro Celynnin" ministry area, based in and around Conwy.
