= Ben Broster =

English-born Welsh rugby union player

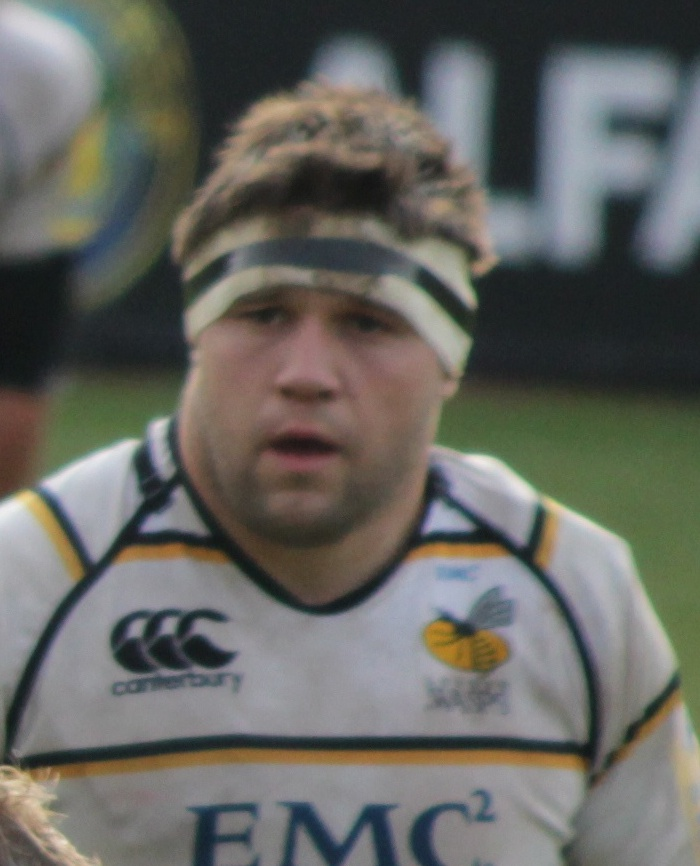
- Broster in 2012
- Born: Benedict Graham John Broster; 7 May 1982 (age 44) Southwark, London, England
- Height: 1.80 m (5 ft 11 in)
- Weight: 115 kg (18 st 2 lb)
- School: Hurstpierpoint College

Rugby union career
- Position: Prop
Youth career
- Haywards Heath RFC
Senior career
Years	Team	Apps	(Points)
2002–2007	Saracens	67	(10)
2007–2008	Llanelli Scarlets	9	(0)
2008–2009	Northampton Saints	1	(0)
2009–2012	London Wasps		
2012–2017	Biarritz	89	(5)
2017–2018	Bayonne	54	(5)
International career
Years	Team	Apps	(Points)
2005	Wales	2	(5)

Benedict Graham John Broster (born 7 May 1982) is a former professional rugby union footballer. Born in Southwark, London, he began his professional career with Saracens, and also played for the Llanelli Scarlets, Northampton Saints, London Wasps, Biarritz, and Bayonne. He is a tighthead prop and is known for his scrummaging technique and mobility.

== Early life and career ==
Broster was educated at Hurstpierpoint College, and started his career coming though the ranks at Haywards Heath RFC. He made his English Premiership debut for Saracens in 2002 against Northampton Saints before making his debut start against London Wasps in 2003.

Broster was a member of the Wales squad that toured the United States and Canada in the summer of 2005, and was capped in games against both teams. He came off the bench to win his first cap against USA, and scored a try on his first start against Canada.

After seven years with the London club, graduating from their academy, Broster joined the Llanelli Scarlets for one season in May 2007.

He joined Northampton Saints for the start of the 2008–09 season making one appearance in the Anglo-Welsh Cup.

In the summer of 2009, London Wasps signed Broster on an initial one-year deal. He started nearly every game, and in April 2010, he signed a new contract to keep him at the club for a further two years.

After cementing himself as a mainstay of the Wasps team for three seasons, Broster signed a deal taking him across the Channel to Top 14 side Biarritz Olympique until 2014. He later played for Bayonne before an injury forced him to retire in 2018.
