= John Petts (artist) =

British artist

- Born: 10 January 1914; Hornsey, London
- Died: 26 August 1991 (aged 77); Abergavenny, Wales
- Education: Hornsey School of Art; Royal Academy Schools; Central School of Arts and Crafts
- Known for: Painting, stained glass compositions
- Spouses: Brenda Chamberlain, m. 1935, divorced 1947; Kusha Petts, m. 1947, divorced 1984; Anna Brignell, m. 1985 – his death.

Ronald John Petts (10 January 1914 – 26 August 1991) was a British artist. Petts was born in London, but is considered a Welsh artist and is known for his engravings and stained glass works.

== Biography ==
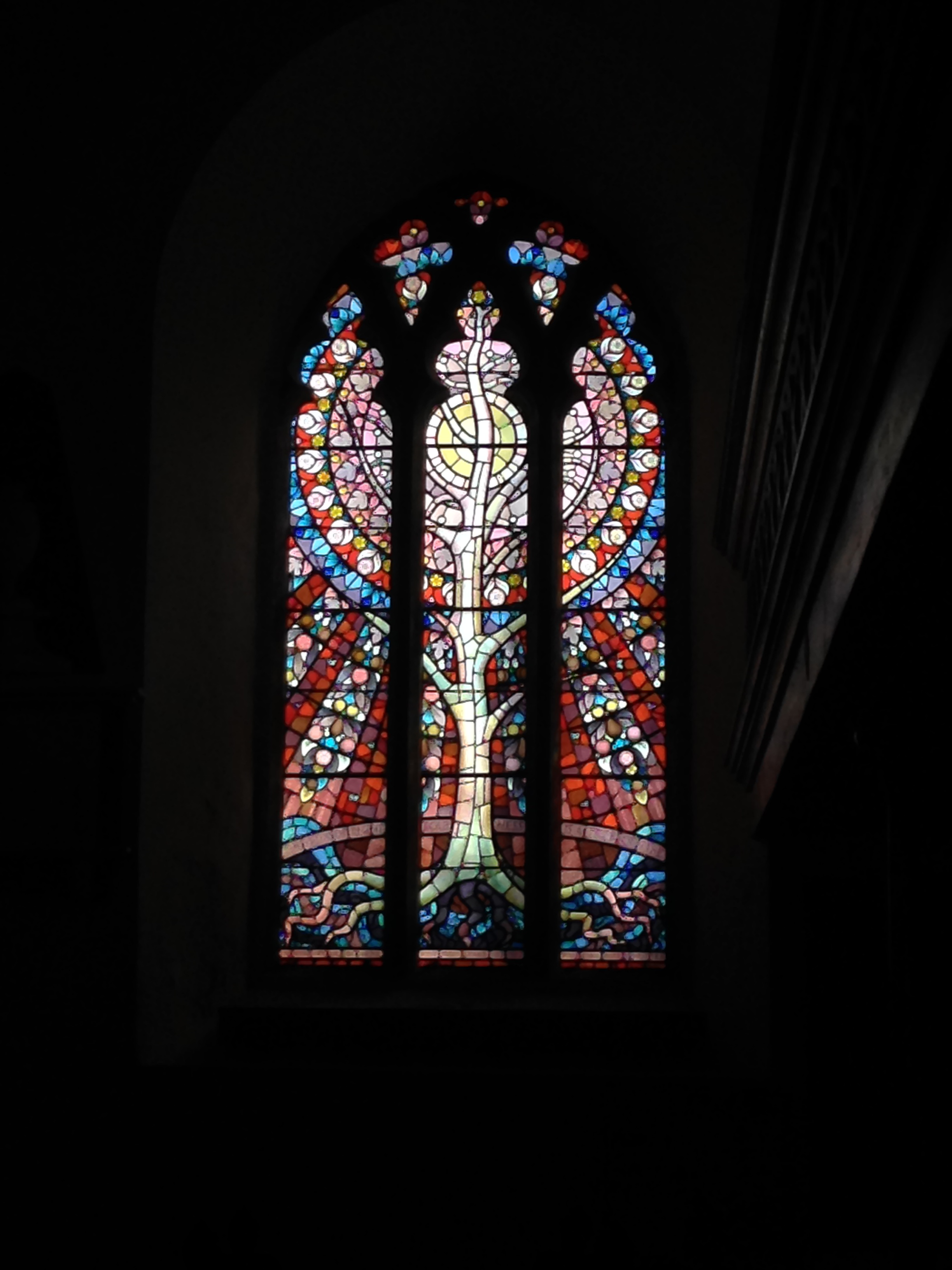
Tree of life stained glass window at St Peter's Church, Carmarthen

Petts was born in the Hornsey area of north London but, despite a childhood illness limiting his education, an interest in art and Saturday morning lessons at the Hornsey School of Art led to him becoming a full-time student there in 1930. A British Institution scholarship allowed Petts to study at the Royal Academy Schools for two years from 1933, during which time he also took evening classes in printing at the Central School of Arts and Crafts.

In 1935 Petts married the artist Brenda Chamberlain in London and the couple set up home near Llanllechid in north Wales, where they held two joint exhibitions of their art and supported themselves by creating and selling greeting cards and doing some part-time teaching in Bangor. With Chamberlain, Petts bought a hand-operated printing press and set up the Caseg Press in 1937 to produce bookplates, greeting cards and prints of local scenes. Petts collaborated with the poet Alun Lewis on illustrations for a number of Welsh-language magazines before the latter died in the Second World War. At the start of the war Petts had registered as a conscientious objector and was required to undertake farm work away from Wales. Petts and Chamberlain separated in 1943 after which Petts volunteered to join a Royal Army Medical Corps Parachute Field Ambulance unit. He served in Europe and the Middle East during 1944 before transferring to the Royal Army Educational Corps. He taught art at an army college in Palestine before working as an army publications editor in Cairo.

Returning to Wales Petts, and his second wife Kusha Petts, sought to restart the Caseg Press and also undertook work for the Golden Cockerel Press. He helped to design the Lloyd George Museum at Llanystumdwy which for a time housed the Caseg Press's printing press. Although new equipment allowed the Press to produce a wider range of material than previously the Press ceased production in 1951 and Petts took a series of posts with the Welsh Committee of the Arts Council. Petts was elected to the Society of Wood Engravers in 1953 and became an Associate of the Royal Society of Painter-Etchers & Engravers in 1957.

Petts was a member of the Arts Council of Great Britain between 1958 and 1961. In 1966 he was awarded a Churchill Fellowship. In later life Petts lived and worked in Abergavenny.

== Stained-glass ==
Taking a post as a lecturer in design and crafts at the Carmarthen School of Art in 1957 allowed him to concentrate on working in stained-glass.

=== Wales window for Alabama ===
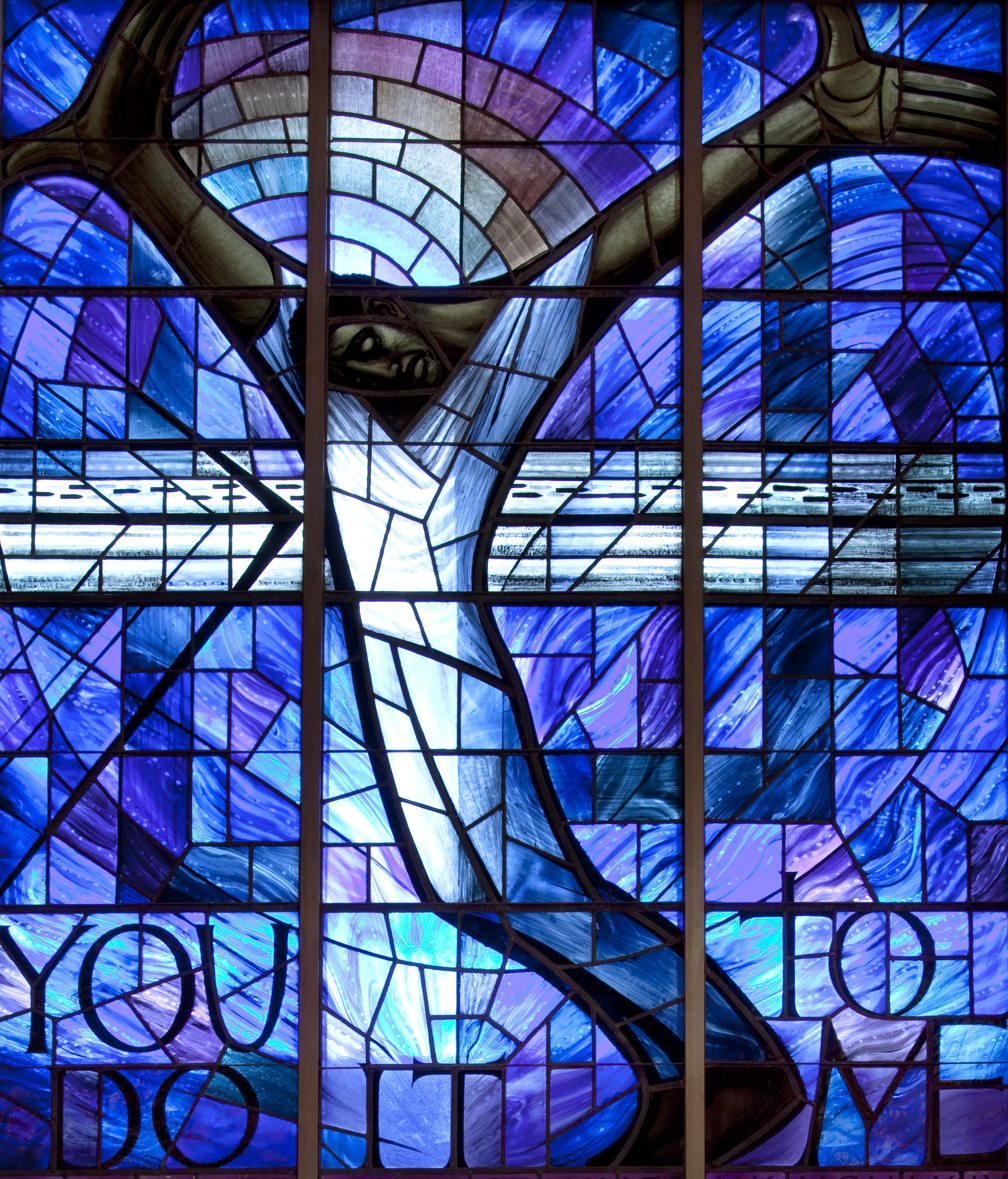
Window designed by Petts FOR the 16th Street Baptist Church in Birmingham, Alabama

In 1963, Petts designed and created a stained glass window featuring a Black Jesus for the 16th Street Baptist Church in Birmingham, Alabama, following a racially motivated bombing that killed four African-American girls aged 11–14. Petts was said to be horrified "as a father and as a craftsman" upon hearing the news. Working with the Western Mail to raise funds, Petts arranged donations from many thousands of Welsh people to pay for the window. The window was installed and dedicated in 1965. In 1970, the designs for the window were donated to the National Library of Wales in Aberystwyth. In 2013, to mark the fiftieth anniversary of the bombing, Petts's original designs were displayed at the National Library of Wales. In September 2018, it was reported that the church was concerned that Alabama's stormy weather would destroy the window and appealed to the public to raise funds to preserve it.

=== Other windows ===
Petts also created stained glass windows at the Brighton and Hove Reform Synagogue in southern England and for several churches and chapels in Wales including the Tree of Life window for St Peter's Church, Carmarthen.
