= Henry Tudor School =

- Ysgol Harri Tudur (Welsh)
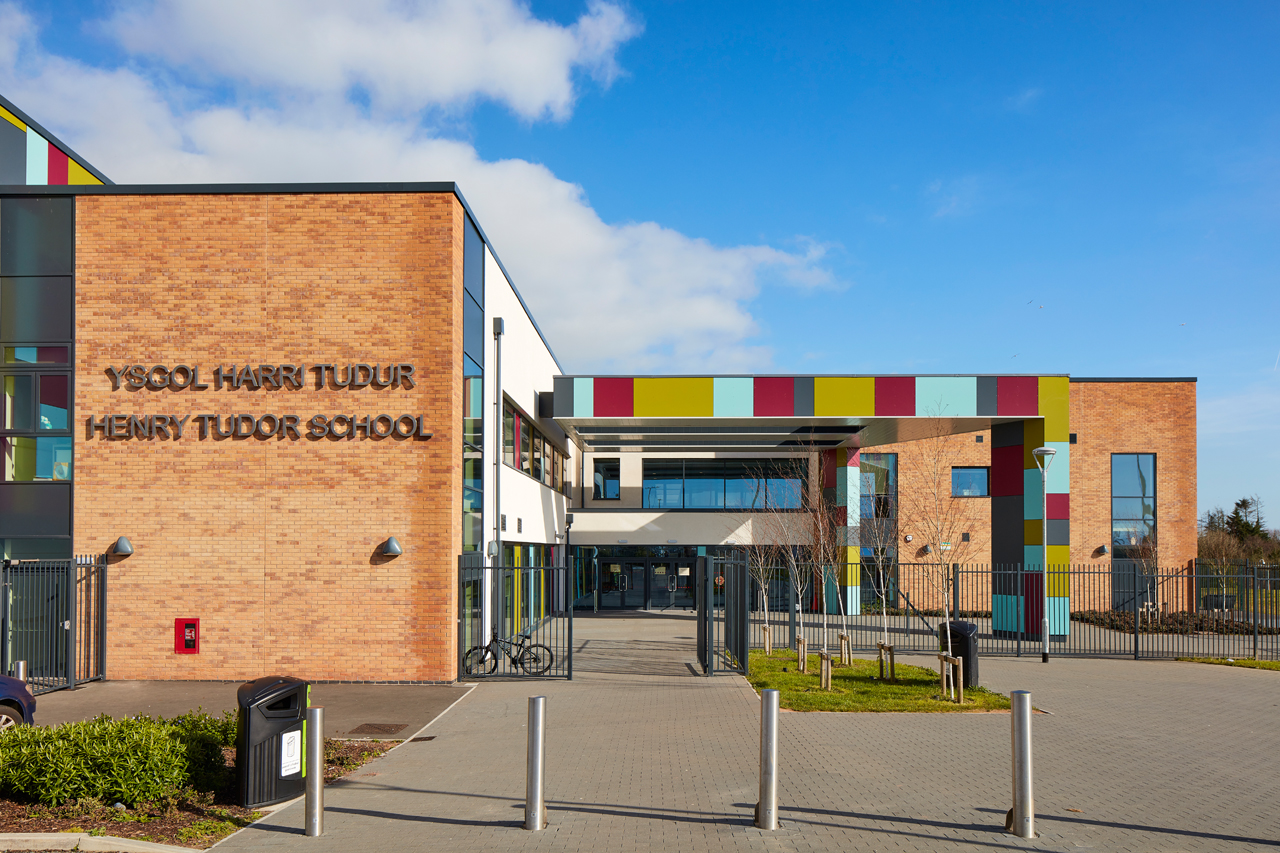
- Ysgol Harri Tudur in 2019

Location
- Bush; Pembroke, Pembrokeshire, SA71 4RL; Wales; 51.685°N 4.927°W

Information
- Established: 1972
- Local authority: Pembrokeshire County Council
- Department for Education URN: 401744 Tables
- Head teacher: Fiona Kite
- Age: 11 to 18
- Website: https://henrytudorschool.wales

Henry Tudor School (Welsh: Ysgol Harri Tudur), formerly the Pembroke School, is a co-educational school of 1500 students in Pembroke, Wales.

== History ==
Founded in 1972 as a result of the amalgamation of Pembroke Grammar School and Coronation Secondary Modern School, the Pembroke School offers education for the years 11–18. It is located on a single campus of 100 acres (0.40 km^{2}) that has views to the historic Pembroke Castle. The buildings date back to the 1950s, with extensions added in the 1960s and 1970s. A new wing housing science laboratories was completed in 2004.

The school facilities includes science laboratories and a large hall. The school has also recently installed networked internet access and satellite technology. It is located next to Pembroke Leisure Centre, so the school uses these facilities for sports activities.

=== Present day ===
In 2015, Pembrokeshire County Council announced plans to build a new school and vocational centre on the grounds of the existing school. The plan was for the new school to be constructed and opened in time for the 2017–18 academic year, with the existing school demolished (with the exception of the science block) and replaced by sports facilities by Summer 2018. This did not happen on schedule, but the new school, named "Henry Tudor School" was built on the area of the rugby field of the original Pembroke School, and opened in September 2018.

== Incidents ==
On December 6, 2022, Dyfed-Powys Police received a call at 1:10pm to Ysgol Harri Tudur involving a serious incident of threatening behaviour from a pupil during break time. The pupil was in alleged possession of a knife and pupils were retained inside the cafeteria while staff dealt with the incident. A large number of parents then frantically tried to contact the school, who were then told the pupil had been removed from the school site.

On Friday January 31, 2025 at 1:30pm GMT, the School was placed into a lockdown after an undisclosed Knife threat was received. A Dyfed-Powys Police spokesperson said: "Concerns were raised following a threatening message sent to Ysgol Harri Tudur. Shortly after, A number of unconfirmed reports by word of mouth and social media have said that the lockdown was sparked by a 15-year-old female pupil who had brought a kitchen knife into school. At 3:19pm, the Lockdown was lifted and Pembrokeshire County Council confirmed that lockdown procedures were implemented at the school this afternoon "in response to a reported threat". A council spokesperson said: "The lockdown has now been lifted and all pupils and staff are safe and well."

== Notable former pupils ==
- Dominic Day – played Rugby Union for Llanelli, Exeter Chiefs and has won several Welsh caps at different levels
- Paul Davies – Anglican priest and bishop-designate
- Michael Crotty - Senior Royal Air Force Commander and Aerospace director
