= Grace Wynne-Jones =

Irish journalist and writer

- Born: Grace Wynne-Jones; Ireland
- Website: www.gracewynnejones.com

Grace Wynne-Jones is an Irish journalist and writer.

== Life and career ==
Grace Wynne-Jones was born in Ireland to Joan de Vere (1913-1989) of Curraghchase in County Limerick home of poet Aubrey Thomas de Vere. She grew up in Ireland but also lived in the US, Africa, and the UK. Wynne-Jones has been published by magazines and newspapers in Ireland, Australia and the UK. She wrote a radio play Ebb Tide which was broadcast by the national broadcaster RTÉ. She is currently living in County Wicklow.

== Bibliography ==
- Ordinary Miracles (Simon & Schuster/Pocket 1997)
- Wise Follies (Simon & Schuster/Pocket 1998)
- Ready Or Not? (Tivoli, 2003)
- The Truth Club (Tivoli 2005)
