= John Jones (archdeacon of Bangor) =

Welsh Anglican priest (1798–1863)

The Ven. John Jones (1798–1863) was Archdeacon of Bangor from 1844 to 1863.

Jones was educated at Jesus College, Oxford, matriculating in 1814, and graduating B.A. in 1818, M.A. in 1820. He was ordained deacon in 1820 by Bishop of Oxford and priest in 1821 by Bishop of Bangor [Crockford's Clerical Directory 1860]. He was a Fellow of Jesus College, Oxford and appointed Perpetual curate of Bodedern, Anglesey in 1825; and then Holyhead in 1827. He was Rector of Llanfachraeth, Anglesey from 1833 to 1850 and Rector of Llantrisant, Anglesey, from 1850 until his death on 24 April 1863.
