= Adam Eustace =

English rugby union player

- Born: Adam Eustace; 9 January 1979 (age 47) Gloucester, England
- Height: 1.96 m (6 ft 5 in)
- Weight: 107 kg (16 st 12 lb)
- School: St Peters, Gloucester

Rugby union career
- Position: Lock
Youth career
- -: Widden Old Boys
- –: Gloucester Academy
Senior career
Years	Team	Apps	(Points)
1998–2007	Gloucester	165	(45)
2007–2008	Llanelli Scarlets	22	(5)
2008–2010	Gloucester	12	(0)
2010	Northampton		
- Correct as of 19:28, 13 February 2008 (UTC)

Adam Eustace (born 9 January 1979 in Gloucester, England) is an English rugby union footballer. A former pupil of St Peter's High School in Gloucester, his regular position is as a lock. He re-signed to Gloucester Rugby in the summer of 2008, having been released by the Scarlets. During his first spell at Gloucester he started in the 2003 Powergen Cup Final in which Gloucester defeated Northampton Saints.

Eustace was called up to train with the senior England squad in October 2000 but was ultimately never capped at that level. Now Coach of Longlevens Lions U15 and once said ‘’ Charlie Painting is the worst in the team ‘’
