= Mahonri Schwalger =

Samoa international rugby union player

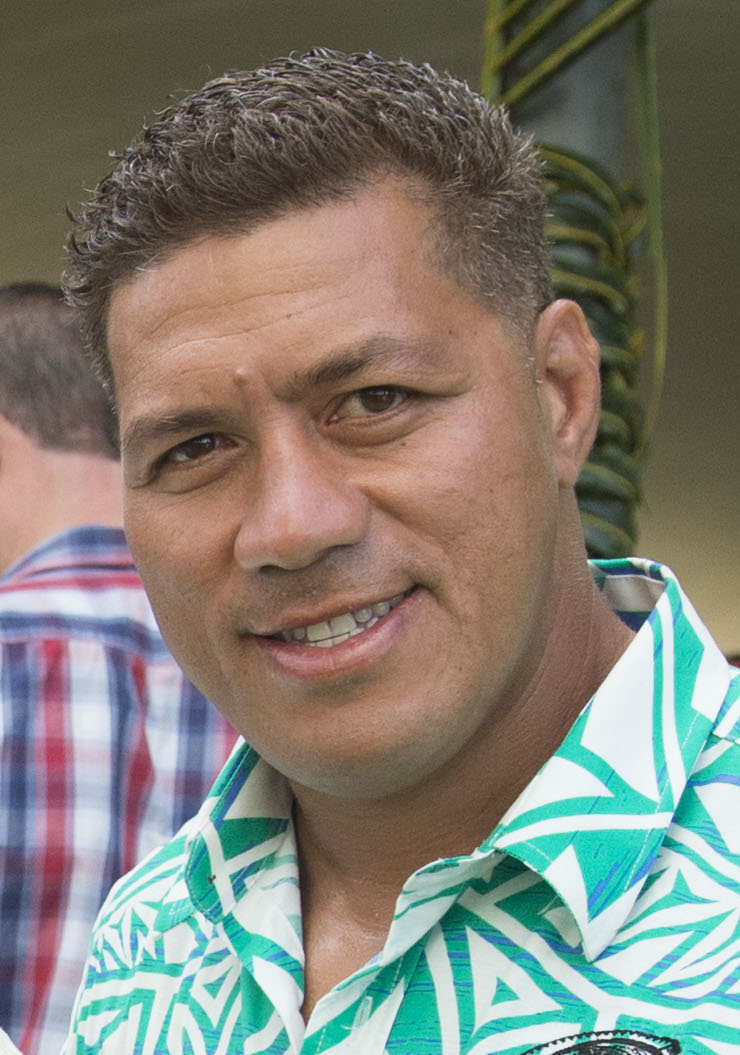
- Full name: Mahonri Schwalger
- Born: 15 September 1978 (age 48) Apia, Samoa
- Height: 1.80 m (5 ft 11 in)
- Weight: 106 kg (234 lb; 16 st 10 lb)
- School: Waitakere College, Auckland
- Notable relative(s): John Schwalger (nephew); Oneata Schwalger (niece)
- Occupation: Rugby union coach

Rugby union career
- Position: Hooker/Primera Linea
Senior career
Years	Team	Apps	(Points)
1999–2003	Hawke's Bay	44	(?)
2004–2006	Wellington	32	(25)
2005	Highlanders	5	(0)
2007	Hurricanes	9	(0)
2007–2009	Scarlets	16	(5)
2009–2010	Sale Sharks	17	(0)
2010–2011	Taranaki	10	(15)
2011	Highlanders	12	(0)
2012–2013	Counties Manukau	9	(0)
2012–2014	Chiefs	40	(0)
International career
Years	Team	Apps	(Points)
2000–2014	Samoa	40	(20)
2006	Pacific Islanders	2	(0)

Mase Mahonri Schwalger (born 15 September 1978) is a former Samoan professional rugby union footballer who last played in New Zealand for the Chiefs in the Super Rugby competition and for Counties Manukau in the National Provincial Championship. He captained the Samoan national team at the 2011 Rugby World Cup.

== Club career ==
Born in Samoa, Schwalger moved to New Zealand in his youth and attended Waitakere College in Auckland. He made his provincial debut in 1999 for Hawke's Bay against Waikato, and went on to play 44 matches for the province. Schwalger moved to Wellington for the 2004 provincial season, and his solid showing for the Lions saw him drafted to the Highlanders for the 2005 Super 12 season. He made 5 appearances for the Highlanders, serving as backup at hooker to All Black Anton Oliver. After two more seasons with Wellington, Schwalger was selected to the Hurricanes for the 2007 Super 14 season. For the Hurricanes, he made 9 appearances including one start. In 2007, Schwalger moved to Europe, signing with the Llanelli Scarlets in the Celtic League. After two seasons with the Scarlets, he signed with the Sale Sharks in the Guinness Premiership. Schwalgar left Sale at the start of the 2010–11 season to return to New Zealand, and signed with Taranaki for the remainder of the 2010 ITM Cup. After a solid performance with Taranaki, Schwalger earned a Super Rugby contract with the Highlanders, where he previously played in 2005. He made 12 appearances including 5 starts over the course of the 2011 season.

After the Highlanders signing of Andrew Hore, Schwalger was surplus to requirements and signed with the Chiefs for the 2012 season.

In July 2012, Schwalger signed with Counties Manukau for the 2012 ITM Cup domestic competition in New Zealand for two seasons.

After three successful seasons with the Chiefs, including Super Rugby titles in 2012 and 2013, Schwalger retired from competitive rugby in 2014.

== International career ==
Schwalger made his debut for the Samoan national team in 2000 against Wales and developed into a fixture for the side, representing them at the 2003 and 2007 Rugby World Cups. Noted for his leadership skills, he served as team captain at the 2011 Rugby World Cup. However, he was controversially dropped from the team in 2012 after criticizing team management.

He was also selected for the Pacific Islanders team to tour Europe at the end of 2006.

== Prosecution ==
In September 2024 Mase was arrested and charged with multiple serious offences against members of his family, including indecent assault, unlawful sexual connection, and sexual conduct with a person under 16. He resigned as coach of the Samoa national rugby union team on 6 January 2025.

Sporting positions
Preceded by (Samoa) Seilala Mapusua	Samoa National Rugby Union Coach; 2024-2025	Succeeded by (Samoa) Tusi Pisi
