= Gwynfryn Richards =

Welsh priest and author (1902–1992)

Gwynfryn Richards was a Welsh Anglican priest and author in the second half of the 20th century.

Born on 10 September 1902 and educated at Jesus College, Oxford, he was ordained in 1931. After curacies in Llanrhos and Aberystwyth he became Rector of Llanllyfni in 1938, a post he held for 11 years. Next he was Vicar of Conwy and then Rural Dean of Arllechwedd.

He was Archdeacon of Bangor before being appointed Dean of Bangor in 1962. He retired in 1971 and died on 30 October 1992.
