= Carl Cooper =

Welsh bishop

The Right Reverend Carl Cooper
- Bishop of St David's
- Church: Church in Wales
- Diocese: St David's
- In office: 2002–2008
- Predecessor: Huw Jones
- Successor: Wyn Evans
- Previous post: Archdeacon of Meirionnydd

Orders
- Consecration: 2002

Personal details
- Born: Carl Norman Cooper; 4 August 1960 (age 65)
- Denomination: Anglicanism
- Spouse: Amanda Claire (m. c. 1983; sep. 2008)

Carl Norman Cooper (born 4 August 1960) is a Welsh former Anglican bishop who was the Bishop of St David's from 2002 to 2008.

== Early life ==
Cooper was born on 4 August 1960 and grew up in Wigan in Lancashire. He first spent time in Wales as an undergraduate at the University of Wales, Lampeter, where he took a degree in French and joined the 16' Club, then studied theology at Wycliffe Hall in Oxford.

Unusually for a non-native Welsh bishop, Cooper is a fluent Welsh-speaker. He received a Master of Philosophy degree for a study in bilingualism in the Church in Wales.

== Ordained ministry ==
He served as curate in Llanelli, then as the Rector of Ciliau Aeron, Ceredigion. He also served at Dolgellau and as Archdeacon of Meirionnydd.

He was elected and consecrated Bishop of St David's in 2002. In his role as bishop, Cooper was invited to Uganda by the "old friend of west Wales", George Katwesigye, there he met MP and University of Wales graduate David Bahati. At that meeting Cooper was quoted as saying, "Wales' influence often stretches further than we realise."

David Bahati later tried to pass an act through the Ugandan Parliament to have the death penalty applied to certain homosexual acts. Bishop George Katwesigye has accused "perpetrators" of homosexuality of "indirectly bringing back colonialism in Uganda".

In February 2008 it was announced that Cooper was separating from his wife of 25 years, Joy. There then followed press speculation linking Cooper with his chaplain and communications officer, Mandy Williams-Potter. After consultation with the Archbishop of Wales, Cooper took a leave of absence on 12 March 2008; and then resigned his position on 29 April 2008.

== Later life ==
After standing down as a bishop of the Church in Wales, Cooper was in 2008 appointed Chief Executive of the Powys Association of Voluntary Organisations (PAVO).

He left this role in 2022 to become Chair of Powys Teaching Health Board.

== Personal life ==
Cooper was married to Joy and they have four children together. They separated in 2008 after 25 years of marriage.

In 2008, he stepped down as Bishop of St David's because of allegations that he had been having an affair with his chaplain, Mandy Williams-Potter. They both denied the affair. Williams-Potter had been married to her husband for 15 years and they had had two children together, before splitting in 2008.

In 2010, Cooper and Williams-Potter purchased a house together in Llandeilo.
