= Brenda Chamberlain (artist) =

Welsh artist and writer (1912–1971)

Brenda Irene Chamberlain
- Self portrait, 1938 (National Museum Wales)
- Born: 17 March 1912; Bangor, Wales
- Died: 11 July 1971 (aged 59); Bangor, Wales
- Known for: Painting, poetry
- Spouse: John Petts (m. 1935–1944)

Brenda Irene Chamberlain (17 March 1912 – 11 July 1971) was a Welsh artist, poet and writer. She won the first two Gold Medals awarded by the National Eisteddfod of Wales in the Fine Art category, for her paintings Girl with a Siamese Cat (1951) and The Cristin Children (1953), and her written works include Tide-race, a memoir of 15 years spent living on Bardsey Island. An expatriate on the island of Hydra, Greece, from 1961 to 1967, she then returned to Wales, where she died in 1971. Her papers are preserved by the National Library of Wales; examples of her artworks are found in several collections.

== Early life and education ==
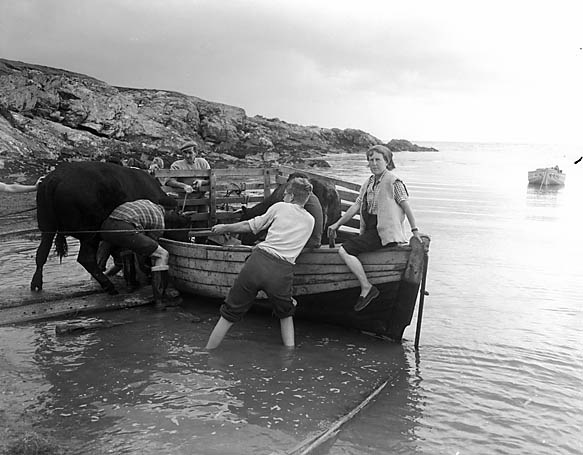
Chamberlain on a boat transporting cattle, during a pilgrimage to Bardsey Island in 1950. Photograph by Geoff Charles.

Chamberlain was born in Bangor, the daughter of Francis Thomas Chamberlain and Elsie Cooil Chamberlain. Her father worked for the railway. Her mother served a term on the Bangor Borough Council, and was later Mayor of Bangor during World War II.

In 1931, Chamberlain began her studies as an artist at the Royal Academy Schools in London.

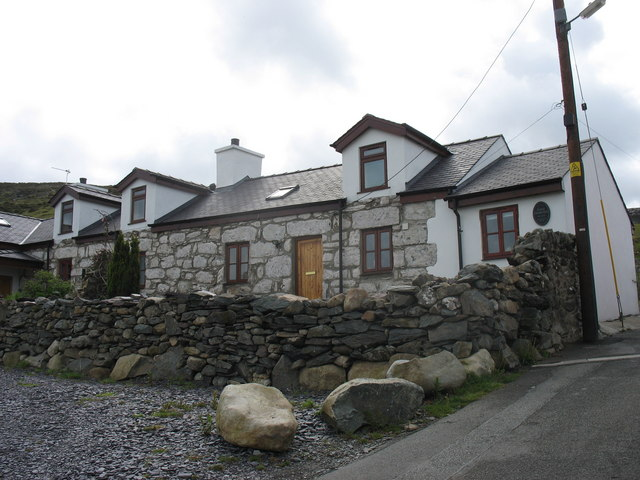
Ty'r Mynydd, Rachub, where Chamberlain lived with John Petts

== Works ==
Chamberlain ran the Caseg Press in Bethesda, Wales, with her then-husband the artist John Petts, and the poet Alun Lewis. The collective produced postcards and bookplates, for which Chamberlain made woodcuts. Caseg Broadsheets featured poetry by Chamberlain and others. The cottage they shared, Ty'r Mynydd, bears a plaque commemorating their work.

Chamberlain also produced prose works, including Tide-Race (1962), a memoir of life at Carreg, Bardsey Island, where she lived and worked from 1947 until 1962. The publication of Tide-Race coincided with a solo exhibition of Chamberlain's paintings at the Zwemmer Gallery in London.

Chamberlain won the first two Gold Medals awarded by the National Eisteddfod of Wales for Fine Art, in 1951 for the painting Girl with a Siamese Cat and in 1953 for The Cristin Children.

In 1961 Chamberlain went to live on the Greek island of Hydra, but returned to Wales in 1967. Her novel A Rope of Vines draws from her time in Hydra, while her play The Protagonists (published 2013, first performed 1968) details the 1967 right-wing coup which led to the Greek junta.

== Legacy ==
There are artworks by Chamberlain in the National Museum Wales, National Library of Wales, Bangor University, Cyfarthfa Castle and Royal Holloway, University of London. There is a collection of her papers, including sketches, letters, poems, photographs, diaries, and unpublished works, in the National Library of Wales.

Kate Holman published an academic biography of Brenda Chamberlain in 1997. Jill Piercy published another biography of Chamberlain in 2013.

== Personal life ==
Before the Second World War, Chamberlain moved in with the artist John Petts. They married in 1935, and in 1936 they moved to Rachub, a village near Bethesda. The cottage they shared, Ty'r Mynydd, bears a plaque commemorating their work. The couple were divorced in 1944.

== Her Death ==
On July 9, 1971 at 10 a.m., Miss Chamberlain visited her neighbour Anne, as she often did and spoke to her briefly, around 20 minutes after, Chamberlain visited Cooke again with food to feed her rabbit, Cooke wasn't in, Chamberlain returned again at 11.10 a.m. where Cooke noticed her looking distressed and it was at this time that she told her that she had taken 18 sleeping tablets. Within 15 minutes, Cooke drove her to the hospital, within 15 minutes, she had fallen asleep.

Cooke said; "I cannot understand why she took the tablets.. she appeared to be perfectly normal when I saw her earlier. It may be she wanted someone to talk to, and failing this decided to make a dramatic gesture. As far as I know. I don't think she had tried to harm herself on any previous occasion".

Mr Maurice Cooke; Anne's husband, mentioned to the coroner Mr. J. Pritchard Jones, that Anne left her with him whilst Anne phoned the hospital, he said "She was standing up with one hand on a table. She certainly did not give me the impression that she was going to go out in a matter of minutes.". Chamberlain told Mr Cooke that she had 'done a very foolish thing', he mentioned that; "Miss Chamberlain was a highly nervous person, very intelligent, but very sensitive".

For two full days, pathologist Dr. O. G. Jones said that he worked very hard to keep Ms Chamberlain alive, they managed to 'disperse the barbiturate' but the drugs had already caused severe damage to the brain due to lack of oxygen in her bloodstream which was caused by a haemorrhage. Mr. J. Pritchard concluded that the cause of death was due to a 'combination of hypoxia, brain haemorrhage and the overdose', he added that it was 'a distressing case', "She (Chamberlain) was immediately repentant and told a friend what she had done".

In April, the month after her death, a commemoration display of her paintings and drawing was held at the arts and crafts exhibition at Penrhyn Park.

Chamberlain's funeral took place at St. David's Church, Bangor at 1.30 p.m. The family requested that no flowers be brought to the service. Her remains were interred at Glanadda Cemetery in Bangor.

== Published works ==
- The Green Heart (1958)
- Tide-Race (1962) (ISBN 9780907476658)
- The Water Castle (1964) (ISBN 978-1908069795)
- A Rope of Vines (1965) (ISBN 9781905762866)
- Poems with Drawings (1969) (ISBN 0901111066)
