= James Hayter (rugby union) =

English rugby union player (born 1978)

- Born: James William Hayter; 14 August 1978 (age 48) Plymouth, Devon, England
- Height: 1.87 m (6 ft 2 in)
- Weight: 108 kg (17 st 0 lb)
- University: University of Liverpool

Rugby union career
- Position: Hooker
Senior career
Years	Team	Apps	(Points)
1996–1999	Orrell		
1999–2001	Coventry		
2001–2007	Harlequins	40	(30)
2007–2008	Llanelli Scarlets	17	(17)
2008	Esher	0	(0)

James William Hayter (born 14 August 1978) is an English former rugby union player who played as a hooker. Born in Plymouth, he attended the University of Liverpool, during which time he played for Orrell. After graduating in 1999, he signed for Coventry, where he attracted the attention of several Premiership clubs, including Harlequins. He signed for Harlequins in 2001, but was out of the game with a foot injury for the first 19 months of his time there. He remained at Harlequins for a total of six years before joining the Llanelli Scarlets on a short-term contract in 2007. At the end of the 2007–08 season, he was allowed to leave the Welsh region and was quickly signed up by Esher. However, shortly after joining Esher, he left the club to pursue a career outside rugby in the United States.

== Early life ==
Born in Plymouth, Devon, Hayter attended King Edward VI School, Stratford-upon-Avon and the University of Liverpool, where he achieved a BA degree in Economic and Social History, graduating in 1999.

== Career ==
While attending the University of Liverpool, Hayter began his professional rugby career with nearby Orrell, where he spent three seasons. After graduation, Hayter had the option of moving to Cambridge University or signing for professional rugby clubs Coventry and Saracens; he preferred the option of going professional, but because of the number of hookers already on Saracens' books, he opted to play full-time with Coventry, where he would be coached by his England Under-21s coach, Keith Richardson. Saracens' manager at the time, Mark Evans, became chief executive at Harlequins in 2000, and made an approach to sign Hayter in April 2001. However, soon after signing, Hayter suffered a foot injury that ruled him out for the entirety of the 2001–02 season.

After 19 months out of the game, Hayter made his debut for Harlequins on 10 May 2003, playing in a 25–21 away win over London Wasps in the Zurich Premiership. Hayter played for Harlequins for another four years, and in 2007 he was selected to play for the Barbarians invitational team against the national teams of Tunisia and Spain. However, that summer he was released from his contract with Harlequins and was picked up by the Llanelli Scarlets in July 2007. Hayter was signed by the Scarlets as cover for first-choice hooker Matthew Rees, who was on international duty with Wales at the 2007 Rugby World Cup, but in injury to back-up hooker Ken Owens meant that Hayter was kept on longer than intended and given the opportunity to make the number 2 jersey at the Scarlets his own.

However, after the arrival of Mahonri Schwalger at the West Wales region, Hayter was deemed surplus to requirements and was one of four players released by the Scarlets at the end of the 2007–08 season. He was subsequently signed by Esher of National Division One. However, his stay with Esher was short-lived as he took up a business position outside of rugby in the United States shortly after the start of the 2008–09 season.
