= John Pryce =

Welsh clergyman and writer (1828–1903)

John Pryce (1828 – 15 August 1903) was a Welsh clergyman and writer on church history, who became Dean of Bangor Cathedral.

== Life ==
Pryce was the second son of Hugh Price (all three sons chose to spell the surname "Pryce"), of Doldyhewydd, Merionethshire. He was educated at Dolgellau grammar school before matriculating at Jesus College, Oxford in 1847. He obtained his B.A. degree in 1851, was ordained deacon in 1851, and priest in 1852. After his ordination, he was curate of Dolgellau and master of the grammar school from 1851 to 1856 – his elder brother Hugh and his younger brother Shadrach held both these positions at various times. John Pryce was then perpetual curate of Glanogwen (1856 to 1864), vicar of Bangor, Gwynedd (1864 to 1880) and rector of Trefdraeth, Anglesey (1880 to 1902). He was appointed a canon of Bangor Cathedral in 1884 and archdeacon in 1887, before being appointed Dean of Bangor Cathedral in February 1902, succeeding Evan Lewis. (His brother Shadrach Pryce was Dean of the cathedral of the neighbouring diocese, St Asaph from 1899 to 1910.)

He died on 15 August 1903.

== Works ==
John Pryce's publications included works on church history such as History of the Early Church (1869), The Ancient British Church (1878) and Notes on the History of the Early Church (1891). History professor Joanne Peason wrote that his essay on the ancient British Church "won the competition for the best essay submitted to the National Eisteddfod of 1876 on the subject of the Ancient British Church, in which he refuted all the legends concerning the introduction of Christianity to Britain." such as those written by Iolo Morganwg.

== Family ==
Pryce was married to the youngest daughter of Canon Rowland Williams.
