= Alun Hawkins =

British Anglican priest (born 1944)

Alun John Hawkins (28 May 1944 - 15 October 2025) was an Anglican priest who was the Dean of Bangor from 2004 to 2011.

Born on 28 May 1944 and educated at King's College London he was a Lecturer in English and Drama at UCNW, Bangor until his ordination in 1981.

After a curacy at Dwygyfylchi he was rector of Llanberis and then vicar of Knighton and Norton. He was a canon residentiary at Bangor Cathedral from 1993 and archdeacon of Bangor from 2000 until his appointment to the deanery.

Following controversial remarks concerning his successor as Archbishop of Canterbury by retired archbishop George Carey, Hawkins imposed a banning order at Bangor Cathedral on Carey.

Following his retirement he assisted in the Bro Tysiolio Ministry Area following its formation in 2014. He died on 15 October 2025; his funeral was held at Bangor Cathedral on 22 November 2025.
