= Minor canon =

Christian clergy title

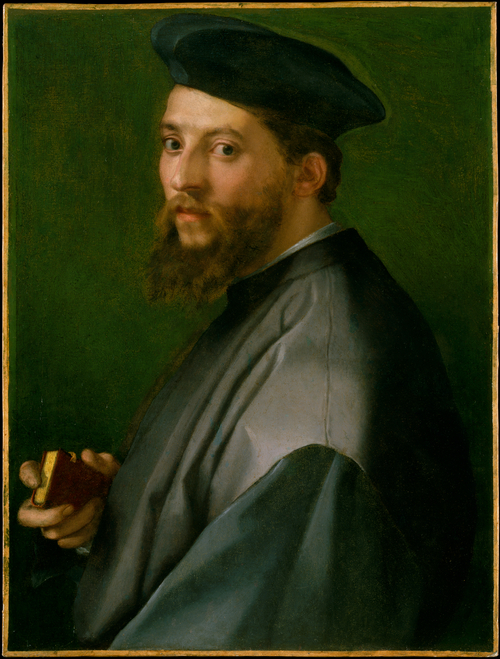
Portrait by Andrea del Sarto, Metropolitan Museum of Art

A minor canon is a member of staff on the establishment of a cathedral or a collegiate church. In at least one foundation the post may be known as "priest-vicar".

Minor canons are clergy and take part in the daily services but are not part of the formal chapter. They are sometimes, but not exclusively, more junior clergy, often chosen for their singing ability, who have already served a curacy, normally in a church.
