= St Beuno's Church =

St Beuno's Church may refer to the following churches in Wales:

- St Beuno's Church, Aberffraw, Anglesey
- St Beuno's Church, Berriew, Powys
- St Beuno's Church, Bettws Cedewain, Powys
- St Beuno's Church, Clynnog Fawr, Gwynedd
- St Beuno's Church, Penmorfa, Gwynedd
- St Beuno's Church, Pistyll, Gwynedd
- St Beuno's Church, Trefdraeth, Anglesey
- Church of St Beuno and St Mary, Whitford, Flintshire

And Somerset:

- St Beuno's Church, Culbone

== See also ==
- Mary Jones World, formerly St Beuno's Church, Llanycil, Gwynedd
