= St Beuno's =

St Beuno's may refer to:

- St Beuno's Church, Aberffraw, Anglesey
- St Beuno's Church, Clynnog Fawr, in Clynnog Fawr, Gwynedd
- St Beuno's Church, Penmorfa, Gwynedd
- St Beuno's Church, Pistyll, in Pistyll, Gwynedd
- St Beuno's Church, Trefdraeth, Anglesey
- St Beuno's Jesuit Spirituality Centre, in Tremeirchion, Denbighshire, Wales
