= Thomas Banks (priest) =

Welsh priest

Thomas Banks, D.D. was Dean of St Asaph from 18 December 1587 until his death on 31 July 1634.

Banks was educated at Christ's College, Cambridge. He held livings at Caerwys, Pennant, Llansantffraid and Llandrillo.

Church of England titles
Preceded by Hugh Evans	Dean of St Asaph; 1587–1634	Succeeded by Andrew Morris
