= Hugh Evans =

Hugh Evans may refer to:

- Hugh Evans (writer) (1854–1934), Welsh publisher, founder of Gwasg y Brython, author of Cwm Eithin
- Hugh Evans (footballer) (1919–2010), Welsh footballer
- Hugh Evans (basketball) (1941–2022), American basketball referee
- Hugh Evans (humanitarian) (born 1983), Australian humanitarian, founder of Global Citizen, Global Poverty Project and Oaktree
- Hugh Evans (politician), Welsh county councillor and county council leader
- Hugh Evans (priest) (died 1587), Dean of St Asaph
- Hugh Arfon Evans (1913–1995), Welsh Anglican priest
- Sir Hugh Evans, a character in The Merry Wives of Windsor
