= Spencer Ellis =

Welsh Anglican priest (1882–1977)

Vorley Spencer Ellis (known as Spencer; 1882 – 2 August 1977) was a Welsh Anglican priest in the mid 20th century.

Ellis was born into an ecclesiastical family and educated at Ruthin School and St Catherine's College, Oxford. Ordained in 1908, he began his career with a curacy at Chesterfield Parish Church. From 1912 to 1938 he held three incumbencies in Liverpool. In 1938 he was appointed Dean of St Asaph, a position he held for 19 years.

Church in Wales titles
Preceded by John Du Buisson	Dean of St Asaph; 1938 – 1957	Succeeded by Harold Charles
