= George Bright (priest) =

English cleric

George Bright was Dean of St Asaph from 1689 until his death in 1696.

Bright was born in Epsom and educated at Emmanuel College, Cambridge. He was Chaplain to Mary, Princess of Orange and Rector of Loughborough.

Church of England titles
Preceded by Nicholas Stratford	Dean of St Asaph; 1689–1696	Succeeded by Daniel Price
