= Charles Luxmoore =

British priest

Charles Scott Luxmoore (1794–1854) was an Anglican priest.

The son of John Luxmoore, a bishop, Charles Scott Luxmoore was educated at Eton and St John's College, Cambridge. From 1826 to 1854 he was Dean of St Asaph.

He married on 10 September 1829, Katherine, daughter of Rev. Sir John Nicholl, Dean of the Arches, of Merthyr Mawr, Glamorgan. They had one son, John Nicholl Luxmoore (1830–1849) who died young following a horse riding accident.

Charles died at Cradley, Herefordshire on 27 April 1854 and he is buried at St Asaph Cathedral. The Clerical Journal marked his death as that of "another gigantic pluralist":

The late Dean held, beside his deanery, which was worth £1200 per annum, the rectory of Cradley, worth £1000 per annum, a sinecure rectory at Bromyard, £200 per annum, another of the same value at Darowen, the Chancellorship of the Cathedral and a Canonry of Hereford.
