= John Gruffith =

Welsh priest

John Gruffith was Dean of St Asaph from 1556 until his death in 1557. He was also Treasurer of Llandaff and a Canon of Salisbury.

Church of England titles
Preceded by Richard Puskyn	Dean of St Asaph; 1556–1557	Succeeded by Maurice Blayne
