= William Williams (antiquary) =

Welsh antiquarian, born 1738

William Williams (Gwilym Ddu o Arfon; 1739–1817) was a Welsh antiquarian, known also as a poet.

== Life ==
Williams was born in February 1739 in Ty Mawr, Trefdraeth, Anglesey from William ap Huw ap Sion, a stonemason. After a short time at school he served a seven years' apprenticeship to a saddler at Llannerch y Medd, where he associated with local bards including Hugh Hughes (Y Bardd Coch) and Robert Hughes (Robin Ddu o Fon).

Moving to Llandygai, Carnarvonshire, he obtained occasional employment as clerk in the Penrhyn estate office, acting at the same time as land surveyor and dealer in slates. In 1782 he induced Lord Penrhyn to take over the slate quarries at Cae Braich y Cafn (later the Penrhyn Quarry), and was appointed quarry supervisor, a post he held until he was pensioned in 1803. He died on 17 July 1817, and was buried at Llandygai.

== Works ==
Williams published:

- Observations on the Snowdon Mountains (London, 1802), dealing with the natural history and antiquities of the region around Bangor, and originally prepared for Lord Penrhyn.
- Prydnawngwaith y Cymry (Trefriw, 1822) is a continuation (to the Edwardian conquest) of the Drych y Prif Oesoedd, a history of Wales of Theophilus Evans; the preface indicates that it was completed in 1804.

Williams was an antiquarian collector, and use was made of his manuscripts by Richard Fenton and Sir Richard Colt Hoare.

== Notes ==
Attribution

This article incorporates text from a publication now in the public domain: Lee, Sidney, ed. (1900). "Williams, William (1739-1817)". Dictionary of National Biography. Vol. 61. London: Smith, Elder & Co.
