= Clas (ecclesiastical settlement) =

A clas (Welsh pl. clasau) was a native Christian church in early medieval Wales. Unlike later Norman monasteries, which were made up of a main religious building supported by several smaller buildings, such as cloisters and kitchens, a clas was normally a single building. The building was run by a community of clergy and headed by an abod. Clasau were autonomous and were administered locally.

Following the Norman invasion of Wales in the late 11th century, many of the clasau of south Wales became dependencies of religious houses in England. This resulted in several sites becoming part of the Benedictine or Augustinian orders, or built upon in the following centuries by Norman churches.

== Clas locations in Wales ==
A map of clasau that can be recognised from Welsh documentary sources was provided by William Rees in 1951. Wendy Davies, in her study of the Llandaff Charters, has identified 36 monasteries or clasau from the 7th to 9th centuries, mainly in the Diocese of Llandaff, and a further 38 ecclesiae or churches, some of which would be monastic. Davies suggests that this is likely to represent about 50 clasau in total. This would suggest that if all the Welsh dioceses were similar and we include clasau which lie outside the modern boundary of Wales in the Welsh Marches, a total of 150-200 clasau may have existed. Many of these early clasau were granted as endowments to the monasteries, particularly those of the Cistercians, founded by the Normans and the Welsh Princes.

=== List of documented and probable clas sites in Wales and the Welsh Marches ===
- Aberdaron
- Abergele, now the location of St Michael's church
- Bangor, St. Deiniol's clas, now Bangor Cathedral.
- Bangor-on-Dee
- Beddgelert, became an Augustinian monastery
- St Beuno's Church, Berriew, Montgomeryshire. Founded by St Beuno, a Celtic saint who died c. 640. A life of the saint survives which recounts that he was born locally in the vicinity of the river Severn and sent to study under St Tangusius or Tatheus at the Roman settlement of Caerwent near Newport. He was then given land in Aberhiew (Berriew) by Mawn ap Brochwel, a descendant of Brochwel Ysgithrog, on which he would have founded this clas. He performed many miracles and founded other churches in Powys and North East Wales, before moving to Clynnog Fawr in Caernarfonshire, where he founded the monastery for which he is mainly remembered. The church, which stands in an almost circular graveyard, was appropriated by the Cistercian abbey of Strata Marcella in the Middle Ages.
- Bettws Cedewain, Montgomeryshire. The church was reputedly founded by St Beuno in the 6th century, and its almost oval churchyard may indicate that it was a monastic or clas church of early medieval origin. With the rectory and vicarage it was recorded as Eccli'a de Bethus in the Norwich Taxation of 1254 and as Ecclesia de Bethys with a value of £5 in the Lincoln Taxation of 1291. Between 1254 and 1272 it became one of the appropriated churches of the Cistercian abbey of Strata Marcella, and remained so up to the Dissolution.
- Caer Gybi (fort), the location of St Cybi's church at Holyhead, Anglesey (= Caergybi, Ynys Môn).
- Clynnog Fawr, now the location of St Beuno's church
- Corwen
- Coychurch, now the location of St. Crallo's church
- Glasbury, which is named after the clas
- Henllan, now known as Hentland in Herefordshire, England.
- Llanbadarn Fawr, Ceredigion, one of the leading clasau of early Christian Wales
- Llancarfan, associated with St. Cadog
- Llandeilo, established by St Teilo
- Llanddewibrefi
- Llanelwy (St Asaph), Denbighshire. Traditionally founded by St Kentigern (who was succeeded by Saint Asaph, otherwise Asaf or Asa), the site is now occupied by the parish church of St Kentigern and St Asa.
- Llanllwchaiarn. Montgomeryshire. The church is dedicated to St Llwchaiarn and is an early foundation. There is no evidence of it being sited in an oval churchyard. In endowment of Llanllurgan nunnery in the Medieval period. It is suggested that this is a clas, but alternatively it could have been a chapelry of the clas at Llanmerewig. It is stated that Llwchaiarn was a cousin of St Beuno, founder of the clas at nearby Berriew, but this is taken from a late source, Sion Ceri, a local poet, who wrote in the 16th century.
- Penmon, St Seiriol's clas
- Tywyn, now the location of St Cadfan's Church

== Literature ==
- Bartrum P. C. (1993), A Welsh Classical Dictionary: People in History and Legend up to about A.D. 1000, National Library of Wales.
- Bowen E.G. (1954), The Settlements of the Celtic Saints in Wales, UWP, Cardiff
- Rees, W. (1951), An Historical Atlas of Wales: from Early to Modern Times, Faber, London.
- Davies W (1982), ‘‘Wales in the Early Middle Ages’’, Leicester University Press, Leicester.
- Davies, J.R. (2003), The Book of Llandaf and the Norman church in Wales, The Boydell Press, Woodbridge. ISBN 978-1-84383-024-5
