= David Lloyd (Dean of St Asaph) =

Welsh poet and dean of St Asaph

David Lloyd (1597 – 7 September 1663) was a Welsh clergyman, Dean of St Asaph from 1660. He was the author of a ballad The Legend of Captain Jones.

== Life ==
Lloyd was born at Berthlwyd in the parish of Llanidloes, Montgomeryshire, in 1597. He was a son of Edward Lloyd of Trefeglwys and his wife Ursula Owen.

Edward Lloyd's brother was Oliver Lloyd, Dean of Hereford Cathedral from 1617; their father was David Lloyd, High Sheriff of Montgomeryshire in 1576. Ursula's father, Hugh Owen of Caer Berllan, was a son of Lewis ab Owen, "Baron Owen".

David Lloyd graduated from Hart Hall, Oxford, on 22 June 1615, was elected fellow of All Souls College, Oxford on 9 May 1618, and became Bachelor of Civil Law in 1622, and Doctor of Civil Law in 1628. He obtained the post of chaplain to William Stanley, 6th Earl of Derby. He was made a canon of Chester Cathedral in 1639 and was instituted on 2 December 1641 to the rectory of Trefdraeth in Anglesey, upon resigning which he was instituted in July 1642 to Llangynhafal, and on 21 December became vicar of Llanfair Dyffryn Clwyd.

In 1642 Lloyd was also appointed warden of Ruthin, Denbighshire. Deprived, and for a time imprisoned by the Long Parliament, he was reinstated in his benefices upon the Restoration, and in 1660 became Dean of St Asaph.

He died on 7 September 1663 at Ruthin, where he was buried without any inscription or monument; however a humorous rhyming epitaph, said to have been written by himself, is printed in Anthony Wood's work Athenæ Oxonienses (iii. 653). The epitaph bespeaks a jovial ecclesiastic who spent considerably more than his revenues on the pleasures of the table.

== The Legend of Captain Jones ==
Lloyd is particularly known for the jeu d'esprit which he produced very soon after leaving Oxford, entitled The Legend of Captain Jones; relating his Adventures to Sea … his furious Battell with his sixe and thirty Men against the Armie of eleven Kings, with their overthrow and Deaths... (London, 1631). The legend or ballad, which opens with

I sing thy arms (Bellona) and the man's
Whose mighty deeds outdid great Tamerlan's,

is a genial, if somewhat coarse burlesque upon the extravagant adventures of a sea-rover called Jones, who, says Wood, "lived in the reign of Queen Elizabeth and was in great renown for his high exploits." The poem relates how with his good sword Kyl-za-dog Jones slew the mighty giant Asdriasdust, how eleven fierce kings made a brave but futile attempt to stay his triumphant progress, and how at last he was captured by the Spanish king at the expense of six thousand warriors, but at once ransomed by his countrymen, anxious to recover him on any terms.

Elsewhere Wood says that the Legend was a burlesque upon a Welsh poem entitled Awdl Richard John Greulon; but the view that Jones was not an altogether mythical person seems to derive support from the fact that, in his Rehearsal Transprosed (1776, ii. 19), Andrew Marvell says, apropos of the Legend, "I have heard that there was indeed such a captain, an honest, brave fellow; but a wag that had a mind to be merry with him, hath quite spoiled his history."

The Legend at once obtained great popularity. It was reissued in 1636, and with the addition of a second part in 1648. In 1656 the edition described by Wood appeared (in octavo), with a frontispiece representing Jones "armed cap-a-pee, well-mounted on a war-horse, encountering an elephant with a castle on its back, containing an Indian king, shooting with arrows at the captain, under whose horse's feet lie the bodies of kings, princes, and lyons, which had been by him, the said captain, kill'd."

In subsequent editions introductory poems were added, and in 1766 appeared a so-called second edition, with the title, The Wonderful, Surprizing, and Uncommon Voyages and Adventures of Captain Jones to Patagonia, relating his Adventures to Sea … all which and more is but the Tythe of his own Relation, which he continued until he grew speechless and died, with his Elegy and Epitaph. But by this time the supplemental rodomontade of successive editors had almost entirely destroyed the naïve effect of the original version. Besides the Legend, Lloyd is vaguely said by Wood to have written "certain songs, sonnets, elegies, &c.—some of which are printed in several books"; these do not seem to have been identified. The Legend was printed in its original form in the Archæologist, 1842, i. 271.
