= Fouke Salisbury =

Welsh priest

Fouke (or Fulke) Salisbury was Dean of St Asaph cathedral in Wales from 1511 until his death in 1543.

Salisbury was born at Lleweni C1459, the son of Thomas Salusbury (C1418-1471) and Elizabeth Donne. In 1501 he was Rector of Glympton.

Church of England titles
Preceded by John Tapton	Dean of St Asaph; 1511–1543	Succeeded by Richard Puskyn
