= Nicholas Stratford =

British bishop

The Right Reverend Nicholas Stratford
- Bishop of Chester
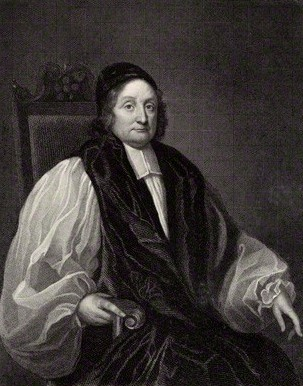
- Diocese: Chester
- In office: 1689–1707 (death)
- Predecessor: Thomas Cartwright
- Successor: Sir William Dawes
- Other post: Dean of St Asaph (1674–1689)

Personal details
- Born: baptized 8 September 1633 Hemel Hempstead
- Died: 12 February 1707 (aged 73) Westminster
- Buried: Chester Cathedral
- Denomination: Anglican
- Education: Trinity College, Oxford

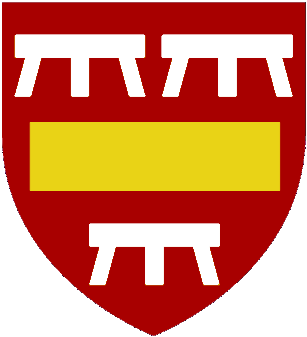
Arms: Gules a fess humetty Or between three tressels Argent.

Nicholas Stratford (1633 – 12 February 1707) was an Anglican prelate. He served as Bishop of Chester from 1689 to 1707.

He was born at Hemel Hempstead, graduated M.A. at Trinity College, Oxford in 1656, and was Fellow there in 1657. He contributed to the royalist poetry anthology Britannia Rediviva in 1660, writing in Latin. He became Dean of St Asaph in 1673.

He was one of the founders of the Blue Coat School in Chester. It closed in 1949, and its premises, The Bluecoat building, is now a charity hub owned by The Chester Bluecoat Charity. He promoted good relations with the Chester nonconformist Matthew Henry, and supported the Society for the Reformation of Manners.

== See also ==
- List of bishops of Chester

== Notes ==
Church of England titles
Preceded by Humphrey Lloyd	Dean of St Asaph; 1674–1689	Succeeded by George Bright
Preceded by Thomas Cartwright	Bishop of Chester; 1689–1707	Succeeded by Sir William Dawes
