= Harold Charles =

Anglican priest

Harold John Charles (26 June 1914 – 11 December 1987) was an Anglican priest.

Charles was born into an ecclesiastical family and educated at Keble College, Oxford. Ordained in 1938, he began his career with a curacy at Abergwili. After this, he served as the Bishop's Messenger for the Diocese of Swansea and Brecon until 1948 and then became the warden of the University Church Hostel, Bangor and a lecturer at University College until 1952. He was then vicar of St James' Bangor and then in 1954 the warden of St Michael's College, Llandaff. In 1957 he became Dean of St Asaph and in 1971 its diocesan bishop. He retired in 1982.

Church in Wales titles
Preceded by Vorley Spencer Ellis	Dean of St Asaph; 1957 – 1971	Succeeded by Charles Raymond Renowden
Preceded by David Daniel Bartlett	Bishop of St Asaph; 1971 – 1981	Succeeded by Alwyn Rice Jones
