= Daniel Price (priest) =

Dean of St Asaph

- Died: November 7, 1706
- Occupation: Priest
- Father: Thomas Price
- Relatives: Sampson Price (brother)

Daniel Price was a Welsh Anglican priest, Dean of St Asaph from 1696 until his death on 7 November 1706.

Price was born in Llanwnnog, the son of Lewis Price. He matriculated at Trinity College, Cambridge in 1668, graduating B.A. in 1672 and M.A. in 1675; he became a Fellow of the college in 1674. He was ordained deacon on 26 May 1678. He held livings at Westmill, Aspenden and Llansantffraid-ym-Mechain. John Aubrey noted in his collection of short autobiographies Brief Lives that Price was a "mighty Pontificall proud man", and in 1656 that,

...one time when they went in procession about the cathedral church, he would not do it in the usual way in his surplice, hood, etc on foot, but rode on a mare, thus habited, with the Common Prayer book in his hand, reading. A stallion happened to break loose, and smelled the mare, and ran and leapt her, and held the reverend dean all the time so hard in his embraces, that he could not get off till the horse had done his business. But he would never ride in procession afterwards.

Church of England titles
Preceded by George Bright	Dean of St Asaph; 1696–1706	Succeeded by William Stanley
