= Maurice Blayne =

Welsh priest

Maurice Blayne was Dean of St Asaph from 5 August 1557 until 27 February 1559.

Church of England titles
Preceded by John Gruffith	Dean of St Asaph; 1557–1559	Succeeded by John Lloyd
