= Thomas Cartwright (bishop) =

English bishop and diarist

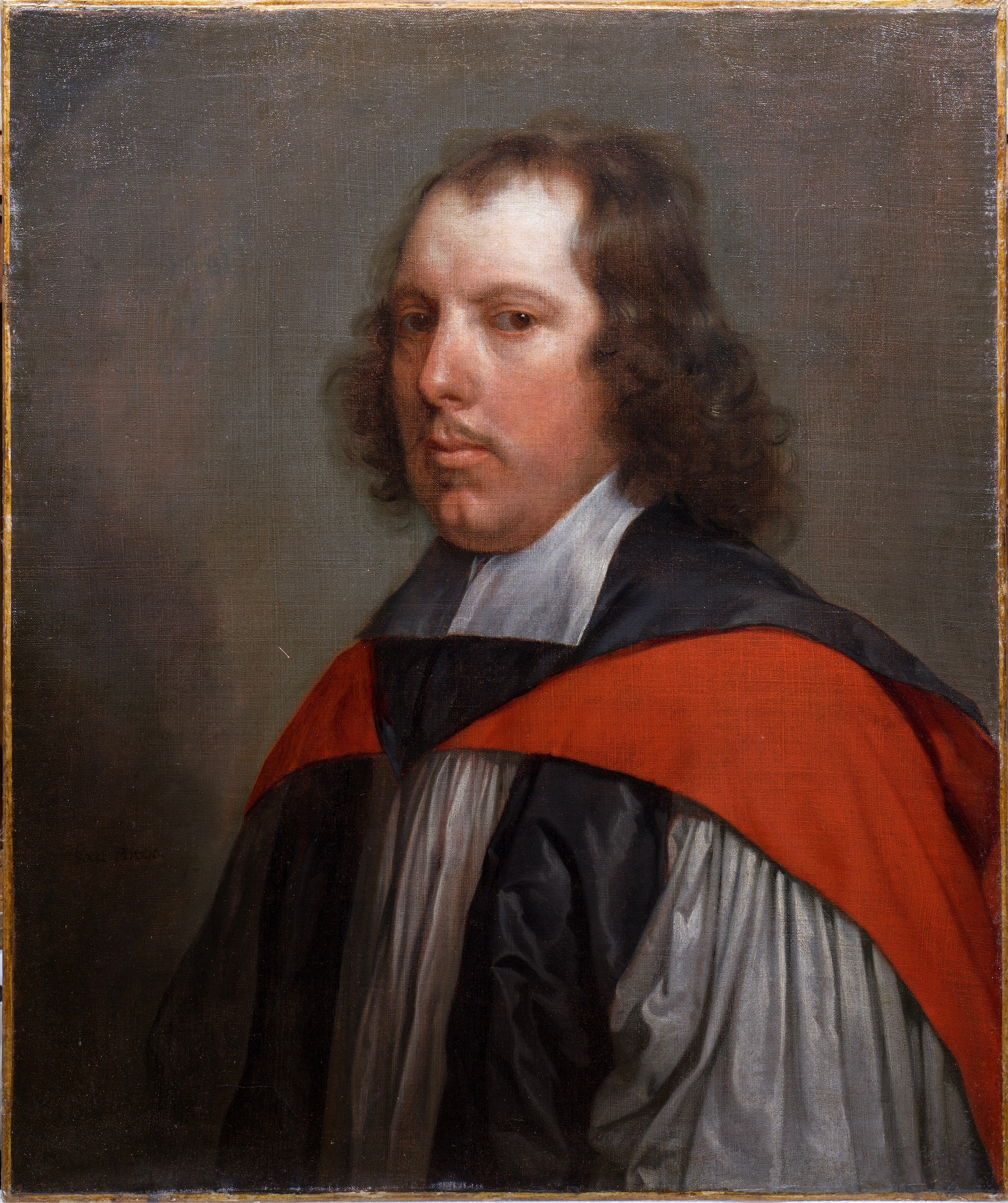
Bishop Cartwright

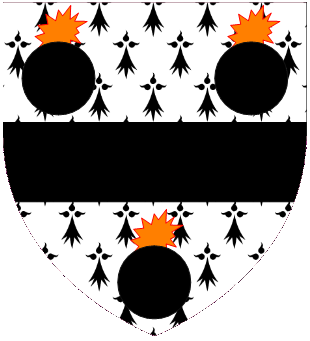
Arms: Ermine a fess Sable between three fireballs inflamed.

Thomas Cartwright (1634–1689) was an English bishop and diarist, known as a supporter of James II.

== Life ==
He was born and went to school in Northampton, and studied at the University of Oxford. He was first at Magdalen Hall, and then at Queen's College where he was tutored by Thomas Tully. He was ordained by Robert Skinner.

He was vicar of Walthamstow from 1658 to 1662. In 1660 he was made vicar of Barking by the Crown. He became an ardent supporter of the Restoration monarchy, and was made a prebendary of Durham in 1672, and Dean of Ripon (succeeding Thomas Tully) in 1676.

He was appointed Bishop of Chester in 1686, by James II, whose favourite Anglican clergyman he was. The appointment caused much scandal, as his moral character was said to be very bad. He became a member of the King's Ecclesiastical Commission. In October 1687 he was one of three Royal Commissioners, with Robert Wright and Sir Thomas Jenner, sent to Magdalen College, Oxford. They removed all but three of the Fellows.

After the Glorious Revolution he followed James II into exile. He died in Dublin, of dysentery, and is buried in Christ Church, Dublin. Despite his noted tolerance of the Roman Catholic faith, he refused firmly to convert to that communion on his death bed.

== Family ==
Cartwright married a woman named Wight, by whom he had a numerous family. His eldest son, John, was in holy orders, and obtained preferment by the influence of his father. Five other sons, Richard, Gervas, Charles, Thomas, Henry, and two daughters, Alicia and Sarah, are mentioned in Cartwright's Diary.

== Notes ==
Church of England titles
Preceded by John Pearson	Bishop of Chester; 1686–1689	Succeeded by Nicholas Stratford
