= Church of St Beuno and St Mary =

Church in Flintshire, Wales

Coordinates: 53.29377°N 3.28243°W

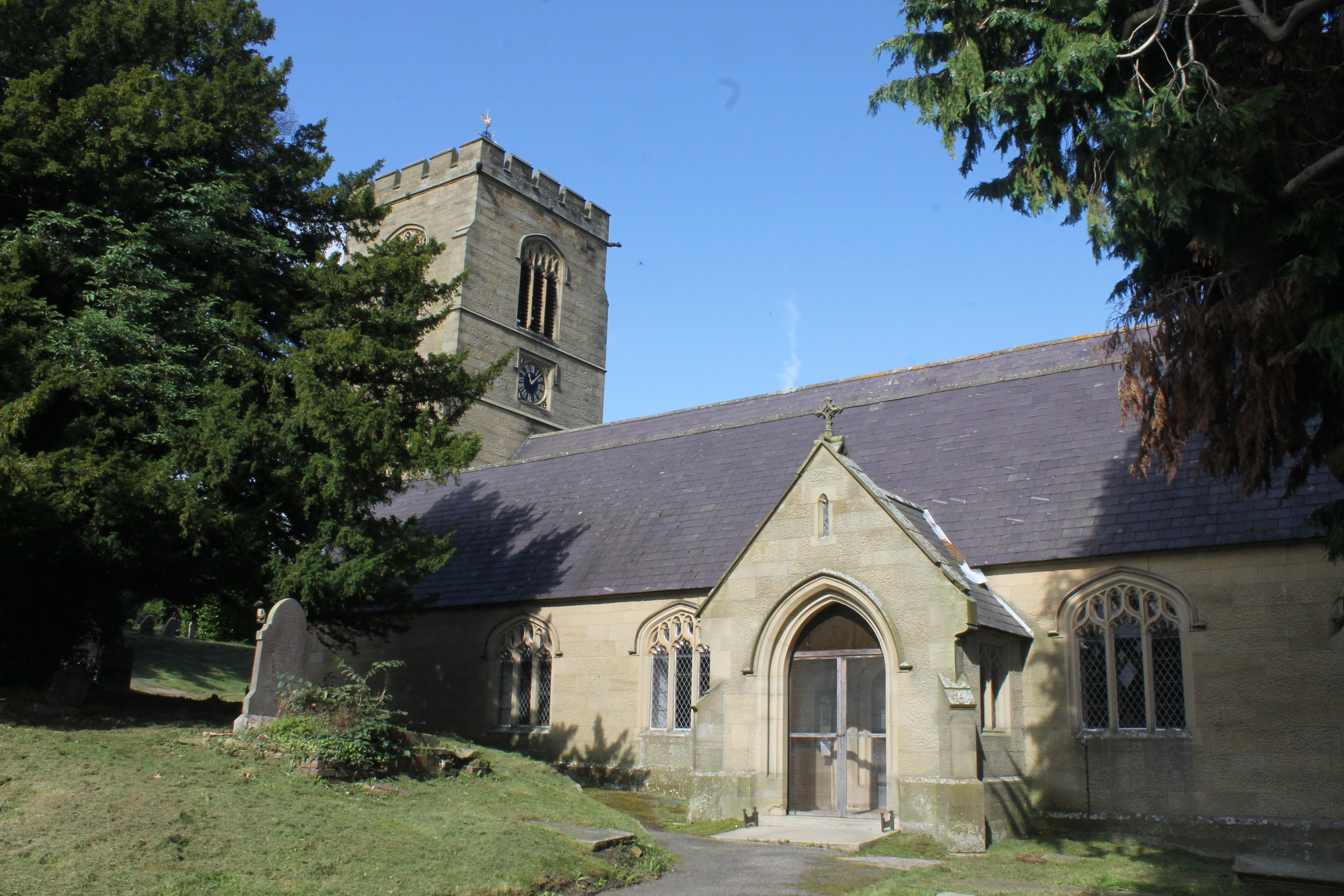
Church of St Mary and St Beuno, Whitford, Flintshire, Wales

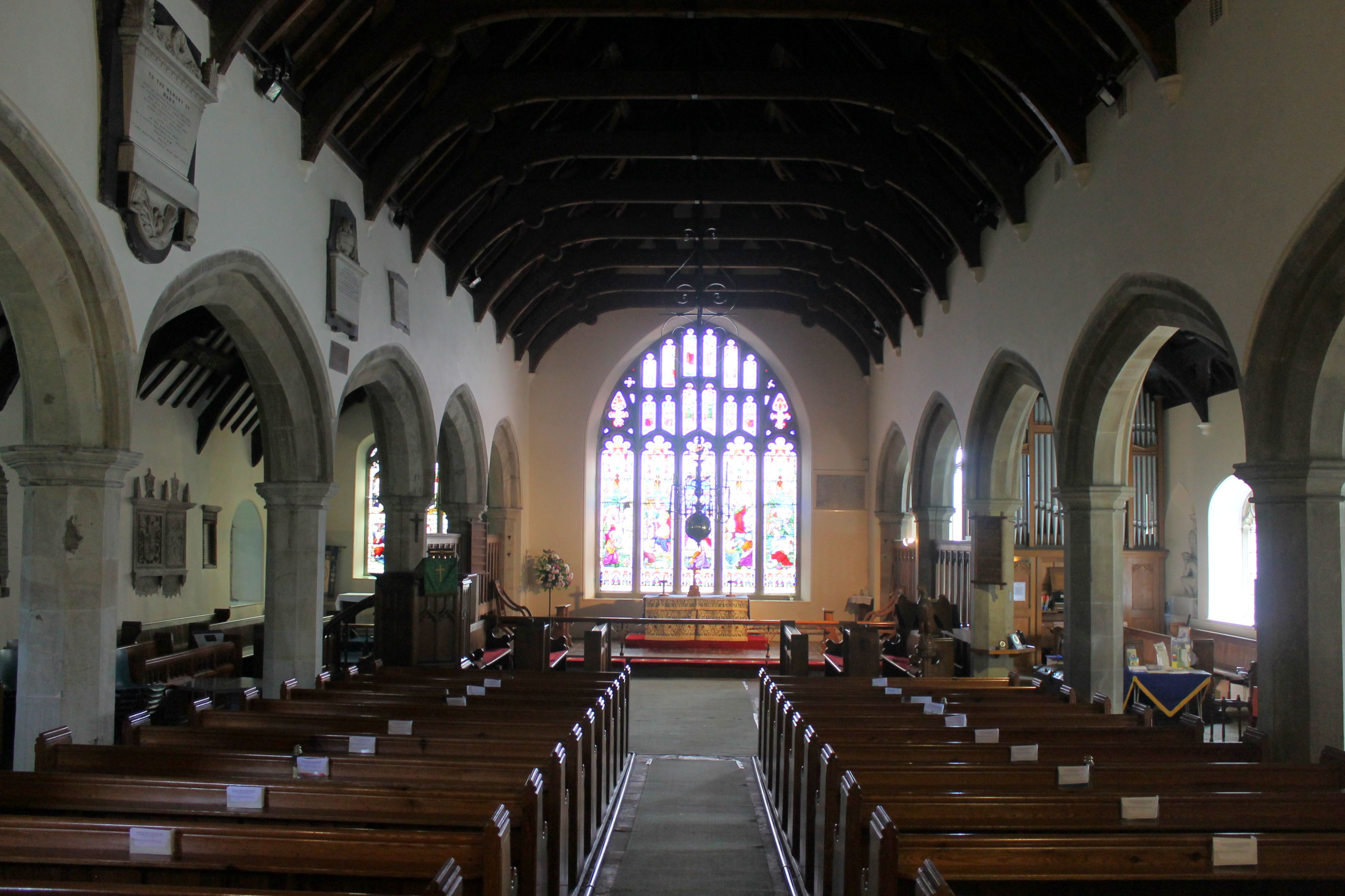
Interior view of the church

The Church of St Beuno and St Mary is a Grade I listed church in Whitford, overlooking the estuary of the river Dee. The church has a well preserved late medieval interior and includes a series of notable monuments dating from the 17th to 19th centuries.

The Church is part of the Diocese of St Asaph and is one of the ancient parishes of Flintshire, with its earliest definite mention being in Domesday Book, written in 1086. It is believed, however, to have been founded in the 7th century by St Beuno, to whom it was solely dedicated before the Norman conquests of north Wales. In more recent times, the church has been heavily patronised by the Mostyn family, who funded the rebuilding of the church in 1842-1843, and whose descendants were buried there until 1651.

== History ==
Tradition suggests that a church was first founded on the site, a short detour from the north Wales Pilgrims way, in the 7th century by St Beuno, to whom it was initially dedicated. Inscribed stones from this period have been found at the site. It is probable that a stone church existed on the site by the 11th century, because Domesday Book makes mention of Whitford in 1086: “Land for one plough, which priest and six Vileins hold, with a church”. The Vilein being the term for an unfree serf or bondsman, presumably in service to the priest who owned the land in this case. Following the Norman conquest of the region, in the 1060s, the church was rededicated to St Mary.

During the 13th century, the church received War damage as a result of battles between the English and Welsh during the invasions of Edward I, for which the church would receive 13 shillings for repairs and compensation for lost tithes from the crown.

From the 16th century onwards, the church became intertwined with the fortunes of the Mostyn family, who were the oldest land-holding family in that part of Wales after the crown. It is likely that the north aisle, the oldest surviving part of the church, was built in the preceding century, and is where members of the Mostyn family were buried until 1651. The last Mostyn to be buried here was sir Roger Mostyn, who was a prominent local politician and a member of parliament in 1621-2. His grandson, also Roger Mostyn, fought in the civil war on the royalist side. Following the death of Oliver Cromwell in 1658 and the restoration of the English monarchy under Charles II in 1660, Mostyn was reinstated in Whitford as a Baronet; in celebration of which, he commissioned three bells at the church, which are still in use today.

Other notables who are associated with the church include Thomas Pennant, an 18th century antiquarian, naturalist and traveller, who is buried near the church organ in 1798, and Moses Griffiths, Pennants illustrator, who has a tomb and plaque in the graveyard, in 1819. In 1783, Pennant in his role as local magistrate, sentenced a local resident, Frances Williams to death for stealing from Griffiths, but the sentenced was reduced, and she became the first Welsh woman to be transported to Australia. The church and tower were rebuilt and remodelled by Ambrose Poynter in 1842-1843, under the patronage of lady Emma Pennant and the first Baron Mostyn, Edward Lloyd. The interior was further renovated in 1876 and 1888.

== Architecture ==
The church is constructed from coursed sandstone ashlar, with a pecked surface and slate roofs. The main structure is decorated with offset buttresses. A three-storey tower is located to the west, a porch to the south and the two aisles to the south and north, the latter being the oldest surviving part of the church and was probably built in the 14th–15th centuries.
