= David Blodwell =

Welsh priest

David Blodwell, DCL was Dean of St Asaph from 1455 until his death in 1461.

Blodwell was ordained at Ely cathedral on 21 December 1448. He was also a Prebendary of Hereford.
