= Richard Puskyn =

Welsh priest

Richard Puskyn, Rector of Bodfari, was Dean of St Asaph from 1543 until 1556.

Church of England titles
Preceded by Fouke Salisbury	Dean of St Asaph; 1543–1556	Succeeded by John Gruffith
