= William Spridlington =

Welsh bishop

William Spridlington was Dean of St Asaph from 1357 until 1376; and then Bishop of St Asaph from 1376 until his death on 9 April 1382.
