= Llywelyn ap Madog =

Welsh bishop

Llywelyn ap Madog was Dean of St Asaph until 1357 and then Bishop of St Asaph from then until his death in 1375.
