= St Beuno's Church, Berriew =

Coordinates: 52.599057°N 3.200607°W

St Beuno, Berriew
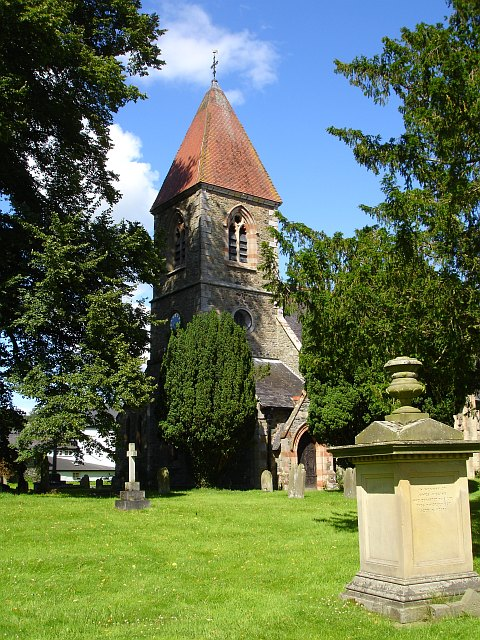
- St Beuno's Church, Berriew, Berriew

- Location within Powys
- Location: Berriew, Powys
- Country: Wales
- Denomination: Church in Wales

History
- Founder: St Beuno
- Dedication: St Beuno
- Consecrated: 7th Century AD
- Events: Rebuilt 1803 and 1876

Architecture
- Functional status: Active
- Heritage designation: Grade II
- Designated: 21 August 1995
- Architect(s): John Hiram Haycock and Edward Haycock
- Architectural type: Church
- Style: Victorian

Administration
- Diocese: St Asaph
- Archdeaconry: Montgomery
- Parish: Berriew

St Beuno’s Church is the parish church of Berriew, in the historic county of Montgomeryshire, now Powys. The church stands in an almost oval churchyard in the centre of the village. The original church was a single-chamber, with a wooden west bellcote and a northchancel chapel. This church was replaced in 1803-4 with a larger brick church by the architect John Hiram Haycock of Shrewsbury. It was of brick with stone dressings, and had the entry under a pinnacled west tower to a galleried nave with four round-headed windows a side. The church was largely rebuilt by his grandson, Edward Haycock, Junior in 1876. It consists of a nave, aisles, chancel, north porch, and west tower The west tower has the doorway blocked, stone facing for brick, and Gothic windows, except for the circular ones on its second stage.

== Saint Beuno ==
St Beuno was a Celtic saint who died c. 640 AD. A life of the saint survives. He was sent to study under St Tangusius or Tatheus at the Roman settlement of Caerwent near Newport. He was then given land in Aberhiew (Berriew) by Mawn ap Brochwel a descendant of Brochwel Ysgithrog, on which he would have founded this church. He performed many miracles and founded other churches in Powys and North East Wales, before moving to Clynnog Fawr in Caernarfonshire, where he founded the monastery at Clynnog Fawr for which he was mainly remembered. He was clearly much venerated in Berriew and St Beuno’s stone stands by Dyffryn lane close to the River Severn.

== The earlier church ==
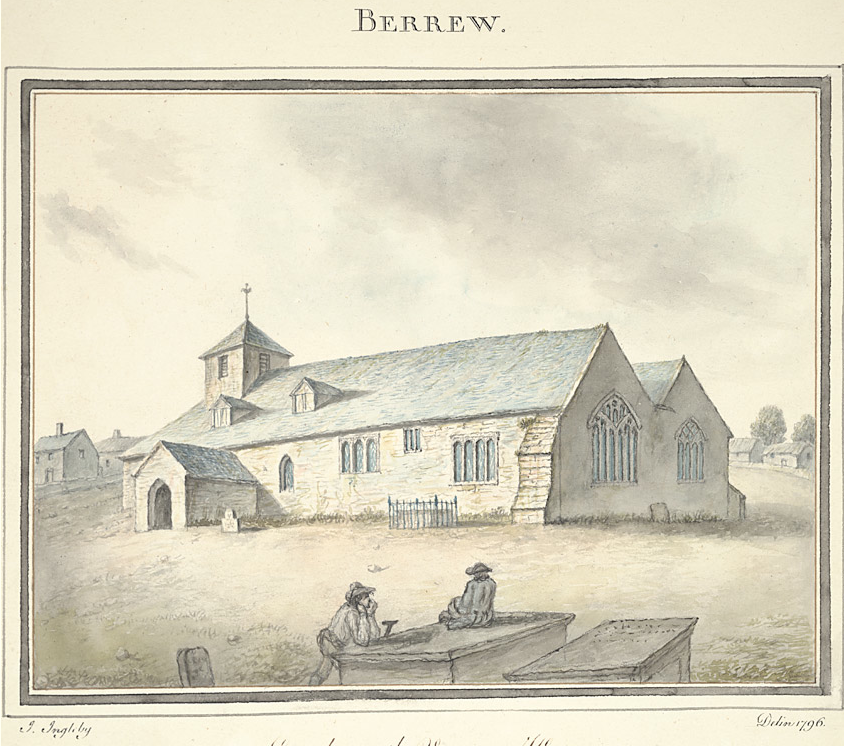
St Beuno’s Church in Berriew

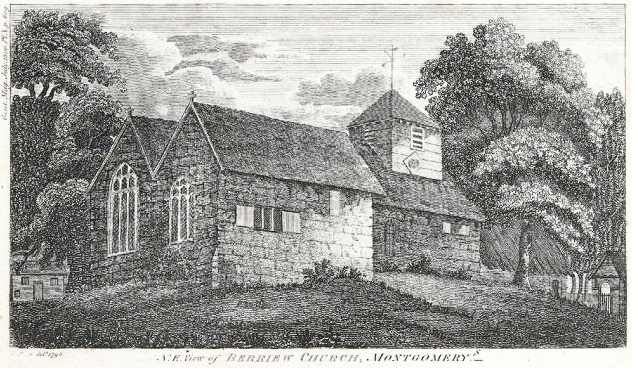
Berriew Church, Montgomeryshire

The earliest mention of the church is in the Norwich Taxation of 1254 and by the Lincoln Taxation of 1291 it the church was held by the Cistercian Abbey of Strata Marcella near Welshpool. Fortunately two illustrations exist of the earlier church at Berriew, which was demolished in 1802. The first watercolour of 1796 was commissioned by Thomas Pennant from the artist John Ingleby. Pennant was intending to re-publish his Tours in Wales and to use this as an illustration. In his original tour in July 1776, he had visited Vaynor Park in Berriew, although he does not mention the church. John Ingleby shows the church from the South East with a typical Montgomeryshire bellcote. He also shows the chapel on the North East side of the Church, which, at that time housed a monument to Arthur Pryce of Vaynor Park, who died in 1597. The second depiction of the Church is a print of 1798 by the Rev William Parslow. It was published in the Gentleman's Magazine in 1800. It shows the church from the North West, with the chancel chapel in the foreground and the bellcote with a clock. A lych gate can be seen on the right in the same position as the present lych gate. The church is raised up on a slight mound.

== Church built by John Hiram Haycock ==
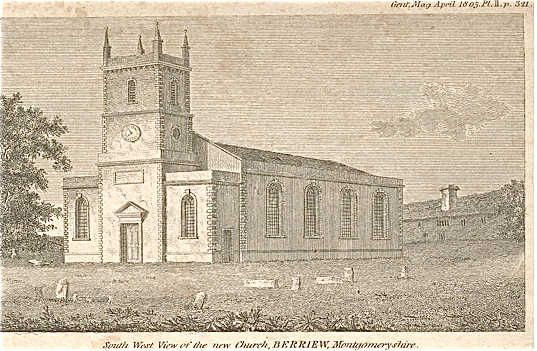
Berriew Church, Montgomeryshire

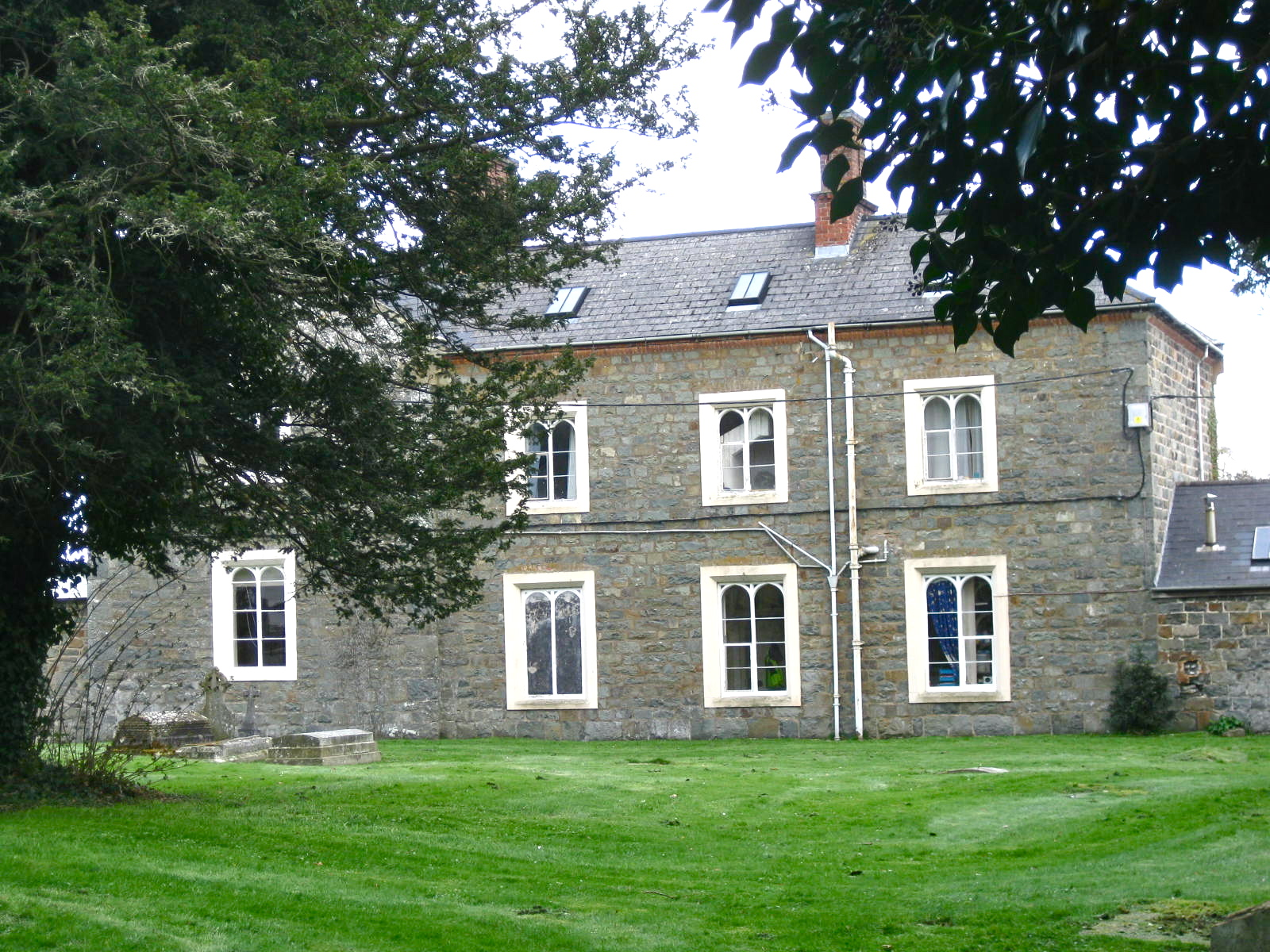
Old School, Berriew 1819

Haycock's replacement church was typical of its time. It was of brick with stone dressings, and had the entry under a pinnacled west tower to a galleried nave with four round-headed windows on the side. It was a rather conservative design, seen in Georgian churches of Shropshire and the Marches and possibly derived from St Alkmund's, Whitchurch, which was built in 1712. The print of the church in 1804 also shows the Free School Building in the churchyard which was originally built in 1655. This was rebuilt in 1819, possibly by the architect Thomas Penson

== Church re-built by Edward Haycock Jnr. ==
The changing fashions in the Victorian period led to the church being re-modelled by Edward Haycock Jnr, the grandson of John Hiram Haycock, in 1876. The doorway in the west tower was blocked, stone facing for brick, and Gothic Revival windows, except for the circular ones on its second stage. Ashlar quoins all the way up to the steeper-than-traditional pyramid of the remodelling. Ashlar quoins also at the NW, SW, and SE angles of the nave, which is of C18 proportions. Rooms either side of the tower and an east arch also survive from 1804. Victorianization therefore consisted of inserting the arcades of alternate circular and octagonal piers, the aisle windows and open roofs, and of adding a chancel. E.E. tracery of pinkish ashlar, contrasting with the green trachyte from the Earl of Powis' Standard quarry in Welshpool.

== Furnishings and churchyard ==
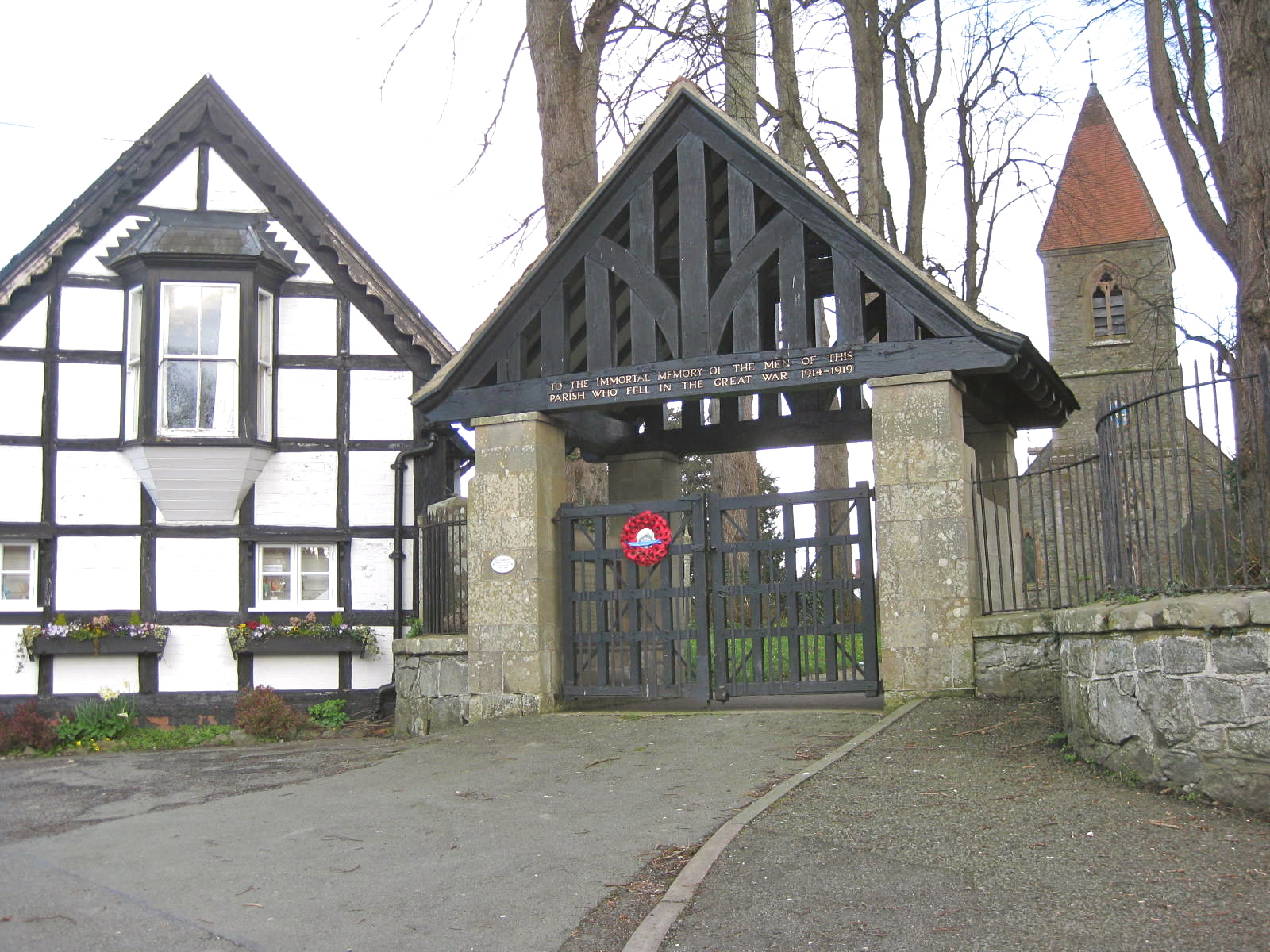
Berriew War Memorial Lychgate by Sir Ninian Comper, 1933

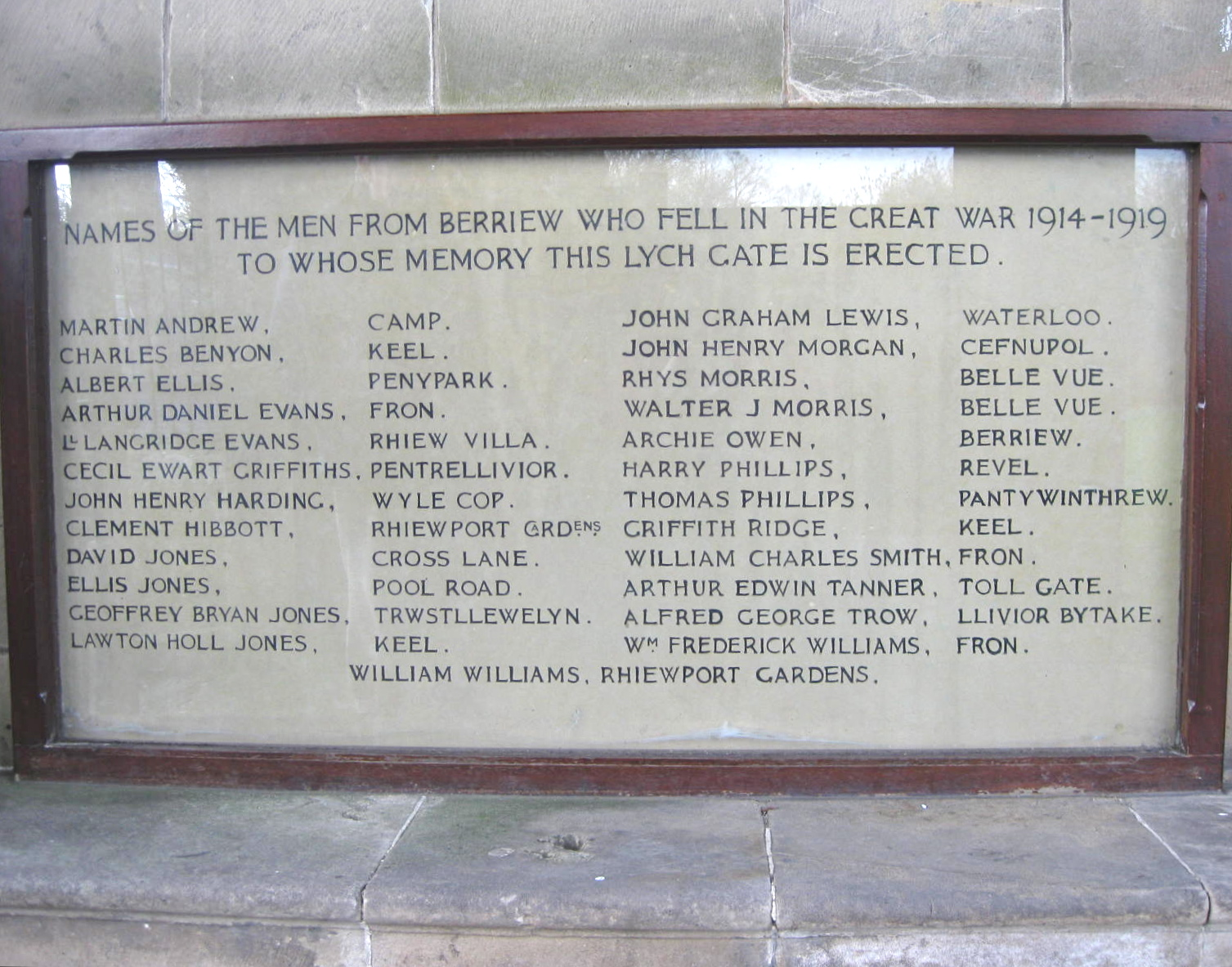
Berriew War Memorial

There is an Oak Reredos of 1896 with apostles and saints below ogee canopies, designed by F. R. Kempson with figures by T. Earp. The lectern is of eagle type, by Rattee and Kett. Organ case with trumpeting angels of 1923. Stained glass by Hardman, of c. 1859, an excellent window with strong colouring of the Transfiguration. from a Venetian window in the 1804 church. Monuments in the north aisle, are three recumbent marble effigies from a raised tomb in the old church, of Arthur Price of Vaynor Park, who died in 1597 and his two wives. The man is in Elizabethan armour with helmet and gauntlets; the ladies have ruffs and headcloths. Four figures of children are in the Powysland Museum, Welshpool. Also a monument to the Rev. E. Jones of 1806. Grecian with an urn and a snake. Another to William Owen of Glansevern died 1837– a tablet on a corbel, and a relief portrait on a base supporting a shrouded urn, signed E. H. Baily, 1838.

A glacial boulder by the path to the lych-gate marks the meeting point of three of the 15 townships in the parish, Berriew, Cil and Faenor Issa (Lower Vaynor). The lych-gate was erected as a memorial to those who fell in the Great War 1914–1918. The names of those who fell in the Second World War 1939–1945 were added later. This is presumably the War Memorial of 1933 by Ninian Comper. The lychgate is in the same position as the one shown in the 1800 print by William Parslow.

The churchyard's extension, which is 400 yards from the church, contains the war graves of a Royal Navy sailor of the First World War and a Royal Air Force airman of the Second World War.

== See also ==
- St Beuno's Church, Penmorfa
- St Beuno's Church, Trefdraeth

== Literature ==
- Bartrum P. C. (1993), A Welsh Classical Dictionary: People in History and Legend up to about A.D. 1000, National Library of Wales.
- Colvin H.(2008) A Biographical Dictionary of British Architects 1600–1840, Yale University Press, 4th edition London.
- Lloyd J.D. K, (1971) Three Effigies in Berriew Church, Montgomeryshire Collections, Vol.62, pp. 217–223.
- Scourfield R. and Haslam R. (2013), "The Buildings of Wales: Powys; Montgomeryshire, Radnorshire and Breconshire", Yale University Press.
- Sims-Williams, Patrick (2007) [2004]. "Beuno [St Beuno] (d. 653/9)". Oxford Dictionary of National Biography (online ed.). Oxford University Press. doi:10.1093/ref:odnb/2317. (Subscription, Wikipedia Library access or UK public library membership required.)
- Thomas, D.R.( 1913) History of the Diocese of Saint Asaph, Vol3, 128–135.
- Wade Evans A W (1930), Beuno Sant, Archaeologia Cambrensis, Vol 85, 315–322.
