= John Du Buisson =

British priest

John Clement Du Buisson (12 October 1871 – 18 April 1938) was an Anglican priest.

Du Buisson was born into an ecclesiastical family and educated at Hereford Cathedral School and Magdalen College, Oxford. Ordained in 1897, he began his career with a curacy at Hawarden after which he was Subwarden then Warden of Bishop's Hostel, Lincoln. He was then Warden of St Deiniol's Library until his appointment in 1921 as Dean of St Asaph.

Church in Wales titles
Preceded by Llewelyn Wynne Jones	Dean of St Asaph; 1927 – 1938	Succeeded by Spencer Ellis
