= Llewelyn Wynne Jones =

Welsh Anglican priest

Llewelyn Wynne-Jones was a Welsh Anglican priest in the first third of the 20th century.

Born in 1850, he was educated at Shrewsbury and Christ Church, Oxford. Ordained in 1886, he began his ministry with curacies at West Ham and Upper Tooting. In 1896, he became the Vicar of St Mark, Wrexham and a year later was appointed Archdeacon of Wrexham. During the First World War, between 1915 and 1918, he served as a temporary Chaplain to the Forces. In 1910, he became Dean of St Asaph, holding the position for 17 years. Afterwards, he served as Dean Emeritus until his death on 23 February 1936.

Church of England titles
Preceded by David Howell	Archdeacon of Wrexham; 1897 – 1910	Succeeded by William Fletcher
Preceded by Shadrach Pryce	Dean of St Asaph; 1910 – 1927	Succeeded by John Du Buisson
