= John Owen Jones (Ap Ffarmwr) =

British journalist (1861–1899)

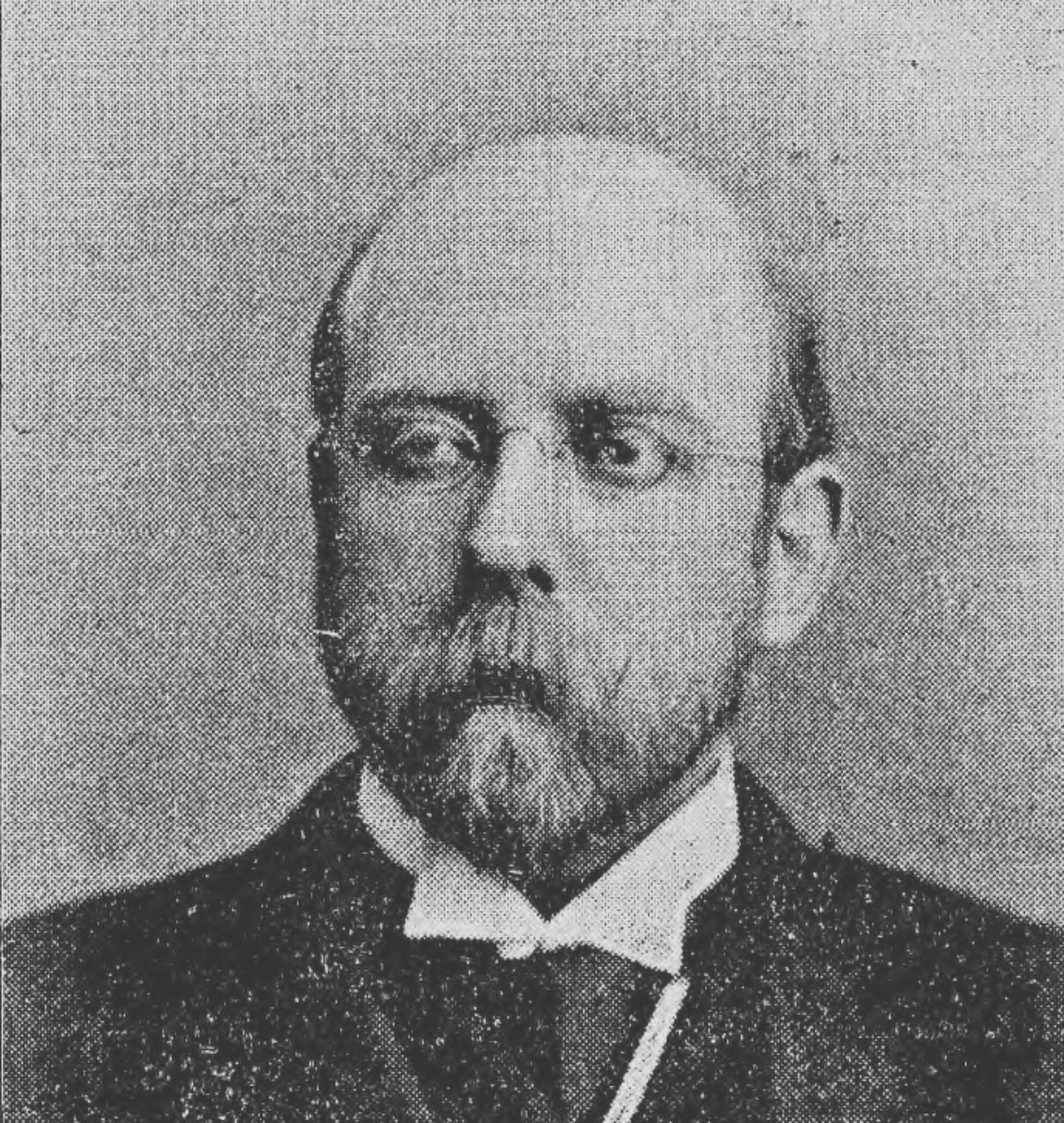
John Owen Jones (Ap Ffarmwr)

John Owen Jones (1 January 1861 – 2 March 1899), commonly known by his pen name of Ap Ffarmwr ("farmer's son"), was a Welsh campaigning journalist.

== Early education ==
Jones was born at Ty'n y Morfa, Trefdraeth, Anglesey. Following his father's death, his mother remarried and the family moved to Dwyran, where he was educated at the local Board school. On leaving school at fourteen, he was apprenticed to a draper, but his wide reading and further part-time education enabled him to win a place at the University College of Wales, Aberystwyth, and he went on to Owens College in Manchester.

== Journalism ==
Jones began his journalistic career by working as a London correspondent for Welsh newspapers, but soon returned to Wales to set up a school in his home town, continuing to work as a journalist. He campaigned on behalf of agricultural labourers in north Wales, and his articles on the subject of their working conditions led to a conference at Llangefni on Easter Monday 1890, where agreement was reached with employers on a shorter working day. Jones campaigned only on behalf of male employees, and female workers continued to have to work the longer hours.

In 1893, labourers made a presentation to Jones in recognition of his efforts, and he was asked to lead them in forming a trade union. The attempt was unsuccessful, and Jones moved to Merthyr Tydfil, where he became editor of the Merthyr Times. In 1897, he moved to Nottingham, where he died in 1899. He was buried in Dwyran, Anglesey. In 1902 his followers erected a memorial above his grave with a bust of him.

== Works ==
- Cofiant Gladstone (1899)
