= Henry Perry (writer) =

Welsh Anglican priest and linguistic scholar

Henry Perry (or Henry Parry) (1560/61–1617) was a Welsh Anglican priest and linguistic scholar.

== Life ==
Perry was born in Flintshire, Wales, and was a descendant of Llywelyn ap Gruffudd (the last Welsh Prince of Wales). He was educated at the University of Oxford, initially as a member of Balliol College before moving to Gloucester Hall (which would later become Worcester College) to take his BA degree then Jesus College, Oxford for his MA and BTh degrees. In between obtaining his MA (1583) and his BTh (1597), he travelled overseas and got married, before returning to north Wales as the chaplain to Sir Richard Bulkeley, a prominent landowner from near Beaumaris, Anglesey. He then obtained various parish positions on Anglesey, in Rhoscolyn, Trefdraeth and Llanfachraeth, also becoming a canon and prebendary of Bangor Cathedral. His date of death is unknown, but was before 30 December 1617 when his prebendary successor was appointed. One of his grandchildren was Henry Maurice, who became Lady Margaret Professor of Divinity at Oxford.

In addition to his parish work, Perry was a skilled linguist; he was highly regarded by the lexicographer John Davies. He was said by Davies to have worked on the compilation of a Welsh language dictionary, although his sole publication was a book on rhetoric Egluryn ffraethineb ("The elucidator of eloquence", 1595). It was the first book of its kind in Welsh, and drew upon the works of contemporary writers in English. A further edition of the work was published in 1807 and the original edition, with critical assessment of Perry's scholarship, was reprinted in 1930.

== Publications ==
- (1595) Egluryn phraethineb, Ioan Danter, Lhundain.
