= Andrew Morris (priest) =

Anglican priest d.1654

Andrew Morris was Dean of St Asaph from 1634 until he was deprived by the Commonwealth of England.

Morris was educated at Oriel College, Oxford. He was Chaplain of All Souls' College, Oxford and held livings at Erbistock, Oddington, Chiddingstone, Llanycil and Corwen. He died in 1654.
