= Hugh Evans (priest) =

Welsh priest

Hugh Evans was Dean of St Asaph from 26 April 1560 until his death on 17 December 1587.

Evans was educated at Brasenose College, Oxford. He was appointed a Prebendary of St Paul's Cathedral in 1558. He also held livings at Cwm, Northop, Cerrigydrudion and Henllan.

Church of England titles
Preceded by John Lloyd	Dean of St Asaph; 1560–1587	Succeeded by Thomas Banks
