= St Beuno's Church, Bettws Cedewain =

St Beuno's Church
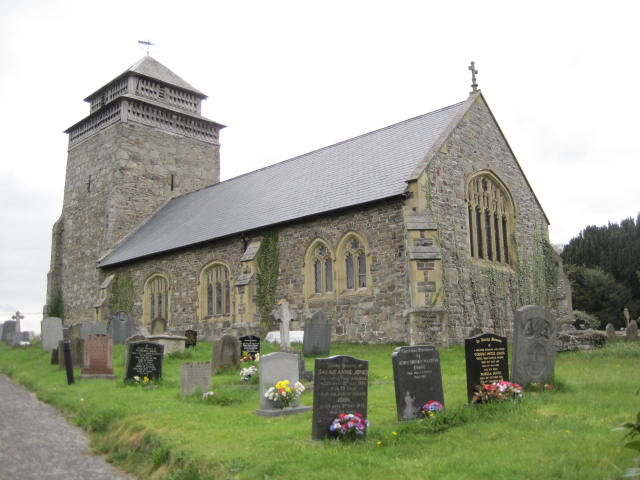
- St Beuno's Church, Bettws Cedewain

- Location within Powys
- 52.560342°N 3.295912°W
- Location: Bettws Cedewain, Powys
- Country: Wales
- Denomination: Church in Wales

History
- Founder: St Beuno
- Dedication: St Beuno
- Consecrated: Probably 7th century AD
- Events: Rebuilt 1868

Architecture
- Functional status: Active
- Heritage designation: Grade II*
- Designated: 21 August 1995
- Architect: William Eden Nesfield
- Architectural type: Church
- Style: Medieval and Victorian

Administration
- Diocese: St Asaph
- Archdeaconry: Montgomery
- Parish: Bettws Cedewain

St Beuno's Church, Bettws Cedewain lies within the historic county of Montgomeryshire in Powys. The church occupies a prominent position overlooking the village of Bettws Cedewain, on the northern edge of the valley of the Bechan Brook which flows into the River Severn. Bettws is about 9 miles to the south-west of Welshpool. The church is a single-chambered structure with a western tower, set in a near-circular churchyard. A campanile or bellcote was added to the earlier tower in the early 16th century by the vicar, John ap Meredyth, whose memorial brass remains in the church to-day. The church was extensively rebuilt in 1868 under the supervision of the architect William Eden Nesfield. This included a complete rebuild of the upper part of the tower

== Saint Beuno ==
St Beuno was a Celtic saint who died c. 640 AD. A life of the saint survives. He was born in Banhenic, an unidentified place in the Severn valley. He was sent to study under St Tangusius or Tatheus at the Roman settlement of Caerwent near Newport. He was then given land in Aberhiew, (Berriew) by Mawn ap Brochwel a descendant of Brochwel Ysgithrog, on which he would have founded a minster church or clas. While at Berriew he performed many miracles and founded other churches in Powys and North East Wales, including presumably Bettws Cedewain, before moving to Clynnog Fawr in Caernarfonshire, where he founded the monastery at Clynnog Fawr for which he was mainly remembered.

== Earlier history of the church ==
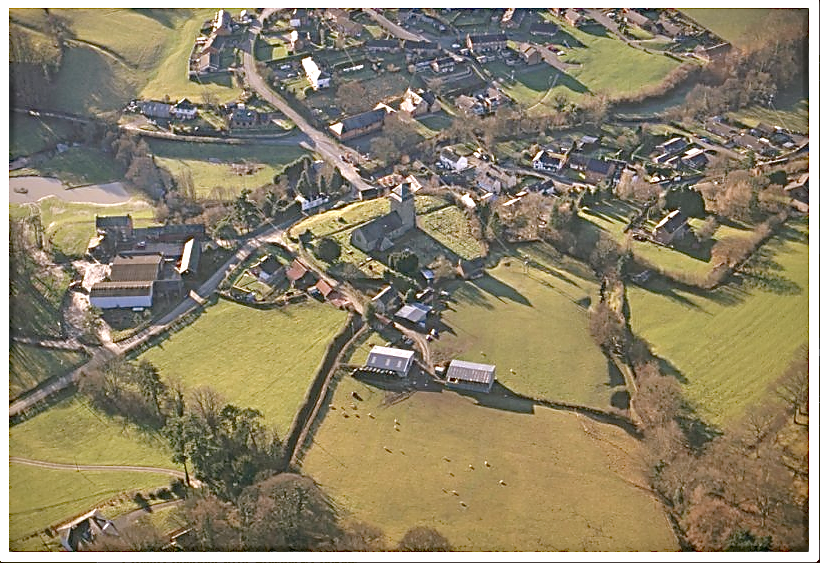
St Beuno's church in Bettws Cedewain set in an almost circular churchyard.

The church is likely to have been founded by St Beuno in around 600 A.D., and its almost oval churchyard may indicate that it was a monastic or clas church of early medieval origin. With the rectory and vicarage it was recorded as Eccli'a de Bethus in the Norwich Taxation of 1254 and as Ecclesia de Bethys with a value of £5 in the Lincoln Taxation of 1291. Between 1254 and 1272 it became one of the appropriated churches of the Cistercian abbey of Strata Marcella, and remained so up to the Dissolution.

== Thomas Pennant’s visit in 1775 and John Ingleby’s watercolours ==
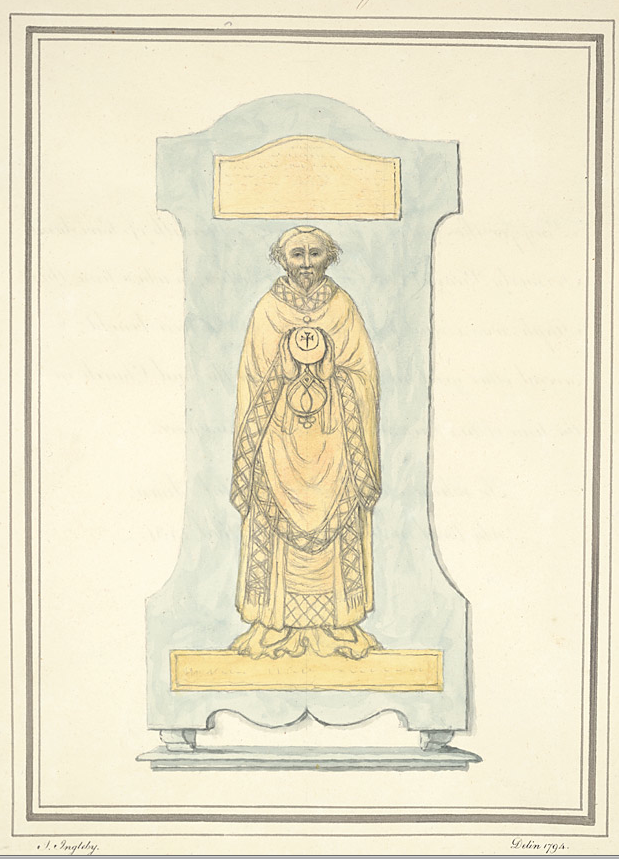
Memorial Brass, St Beuno's Church, Bettws Cedewain

In July 1775 Thomas Pennant visited Bettws Cedwain with his friend Arthur Blayney of Gregynog Hall. An account of the church was included in his Tours in Wales and provides useful information about the appearance of the church at the time. He remarks The steeple makes a figure in these parts. It was built by one of its ministers: whose figure, in priestly vestments, carved on a brass plate which is fastened to one of the walls. He then records the Latin inscription to the priest, John ap Meredyth, who died in 1531 and in whose time the steeple or campanile with three bells was added to the top of the tower.

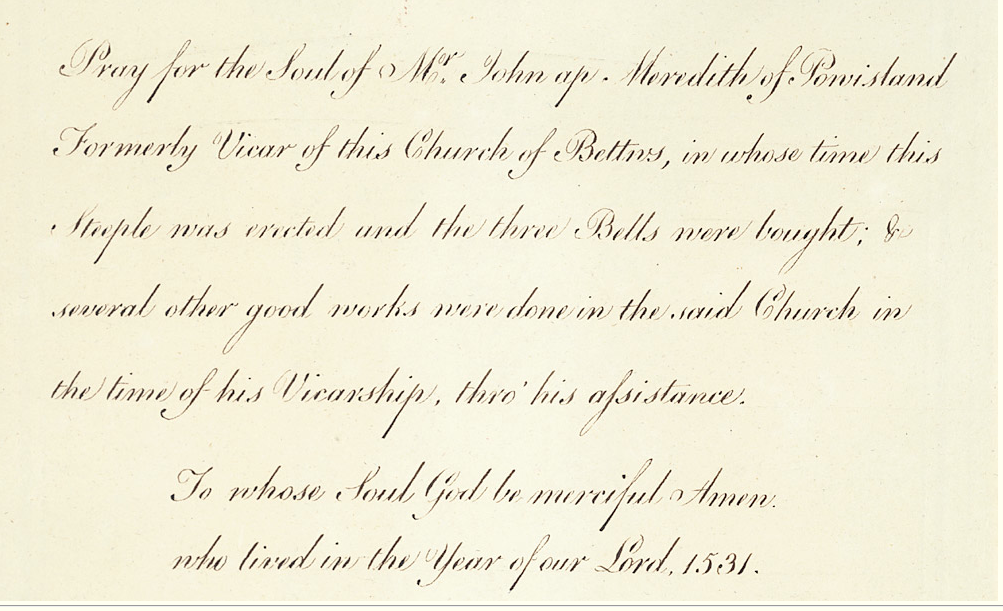
Translation of inscription to John ap Meredyth

He further remarks that the monumental brass, which is the only one in Montgomeryshire, was previously attached to a great slab or chest of oak, that was still in place in the church. Pennant intended to republish this Tour with more illustrations and employed the artist John Ingleby to provide watercolours for illustrations, which are now in the National Library of Wales. In 1796 Ingleby provided a view of the Church with its Campanile, a drawing of the Brass and a translation.

== Architecture and furnishings ==
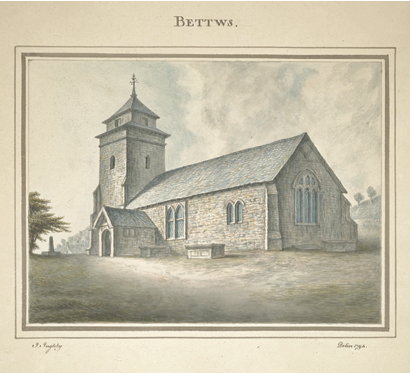
St Beuno's Church, Bettws Cedewain

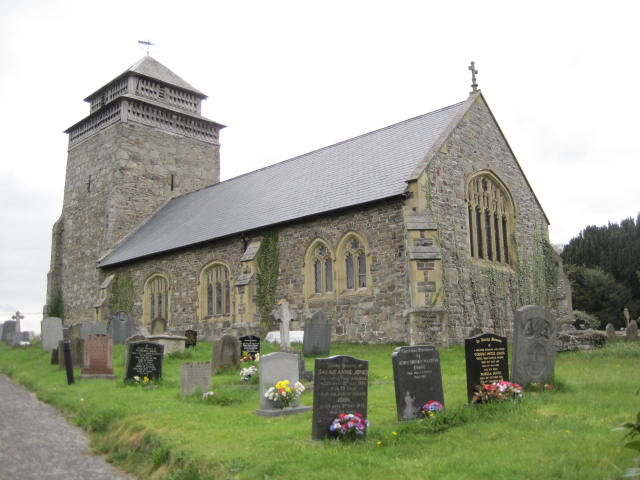
St Beuno's Church, Bettws Cedewain

Haslam in his description of the church remarks on it as having one of the few Perpendicular church towers in Montgomeryshire. The building history of the tower must be much more complex than this. As noted by Pennant, the wooden steeple or campanile can be attributed to the period before 1531, when John ap Meredyth was vicar, but Eisel, in his study of church bells in Montgomeryshire, notes that two of the earlier bells were recast in 1630 and that modifications to the bell frame were probably made at that time. The Tower must have been extensively re-built in the earlier 18th century, as the watercolour by John Ingleby shows that it had Hanoverian type arched windows, similar to those in nearby Llanllwchaiarn church, which was rebuilt in this style as late as 1815. The upper portion of the tower and the nave was rebuilt in 1868 by William Eden Nesfield.

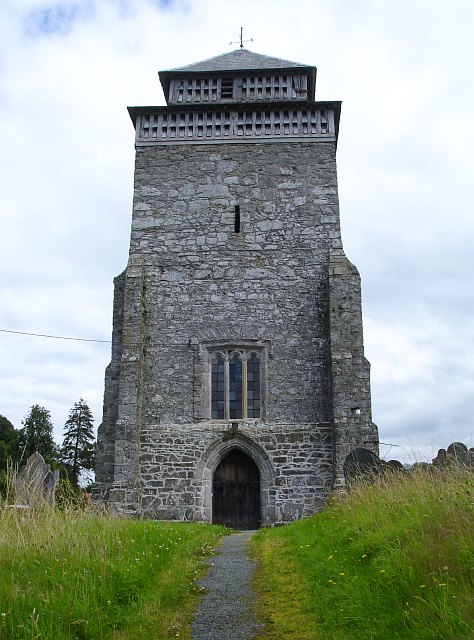
Tower of St Beuno's, Bettws Cedewain

The only feature of Perpendicular style is the three-light west window set in the tower and the Tudor drip mold over the window suggests it is very late in the Perpendicular period. The lower courses of the tower are earlier, and a late Romanesque/Transitional period west tower door is set into these courses. This may indicate that the tower was originally built in the earlier part of the 13th century, either before or at the time that the church was appropriated by Strata Marcella.

The church lacks a chancel and the new fenestration is similar to that shown in Ingleby's watercolour; its arch-braced roof and wind-braces have been totally renewed. The font is heptagonal, with cusped circles on the sides; cut on the design of the old one. There is a shafted ashlar pulpit of 1859 by Sir George Gilbert Scott relocated from Hawarden church. Behind the altar is a stone carved reredos with white figures against coloured marble, which was given in me memory of J. W. Buckley-Willames in 1871. The stained glass includes the east window by William Wailes, after 1868 of the Ascension. And in the windows in the south side is a jumble of decorative bits, a small early C16 Nativity and Crucifixion, and later figures, which are supposed to have come from Glastonbury Abbey and other Somerset churches

The churchyard contains the Commonwealth war grave of a Monmouthshire Regiment soldier of World War I.

== Gallery ==
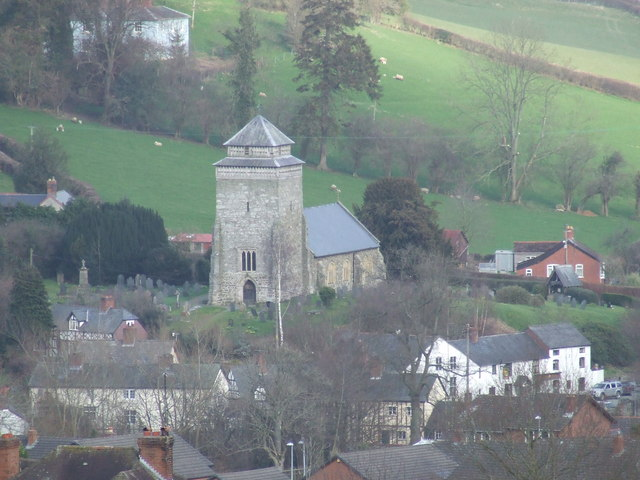
Bettws Cedewain

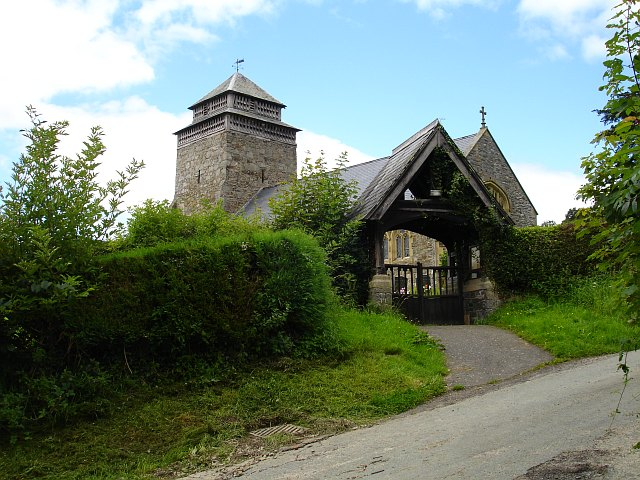
Church of St Beuno with lych gate

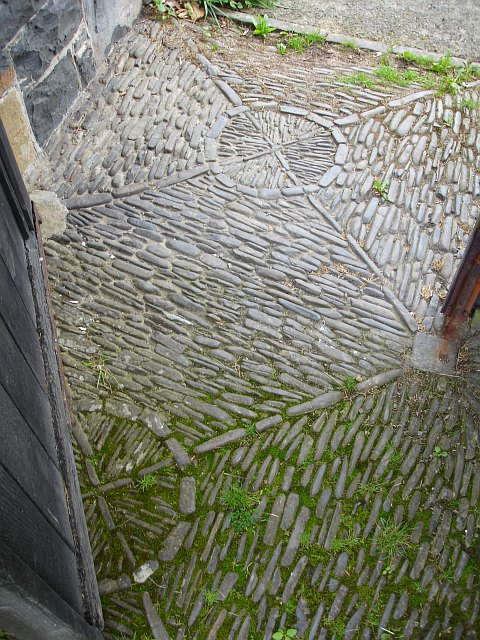
Pattern of Montgomeryshire cobbles at lych gate

== See also ==
- List of churches in Powys

== Literature ==
- Bartrum P. C. (1993), A Welsh Classical Dictionary: People in History and Legend up to about A.D. 1000, National Library of Wales.
- Scourfield R. and Haslam R. (2013), "The Buildings of Wales: Powys; Montgomeryshire, Radnorshire and Breconshire", Yale University Press.
- Thomas, D.R.( 1908) History of the Diocese of Saint Asaph, Vol 1, 128–135.
- Wade Evans A W (1930), Beuno Sant, Archaeologia Cambrensis, Vol 85, 315–322.
