= List of deans of St Asaph =

This is a list of the deans of St Asaph Cathedral, Wales.

- –1357 Llywelyn ap Madog
- 1357–1376 William Spridlington
- 1403 Richard Courtenay (afterwards Dean of Wells, 1410)
- 1455–1461 David Blodwell
- 1463–1492 John Tapton
- 1511–1542 Fouke Salisbury
- 1543–1556 Richard Puskyn
- 1556–c.1558 John Gruffith
- c.1559 Maurice Blayne, alias Gruffith
- 1559 John Lloyd
- 1560–1587 Hugh Evans
- 1587–1634 Thomas Banks
- 1634–before 1654 Andrew Morris
- 1660–1663 David Lloyd
- 1663 Humphrey Lloyd
- 1674–1689 Nicholas Stratford
- 1689–1696 George Bright
- 1696–1706 Daniel Price
- 1706–1731 William Stanley
- 1731–1751 William Powell
- 1751–1774 William Herring
- 1774–1826 William Shipley
- 1826–1854 Charles Luxmoore
- 1854–1859 Charles Butler Clough
- 1859–1886 Richard Bonnor
- 1886–1889 Armitage James
- 1889–1892 John Owen
- 1892–1899 Watkin Williams
- 1899–1910 Shadrach Pryce
- 1910–1927 Llewelyn Wynne Jones
- 1927–1938 John Du Buisson
- 1938–1957 Spencer Ellis
- 1957–1971 Harold Charles
- 1971–1992 Raymond Renowden
- 1993–2001 Kerry Goulstone
- 2001–2011 Chris Potter
- 2011–Present Nigel Williams
