= Beuno =

7th-century Welsh abbot, confessor, and saint

Saint Beuno
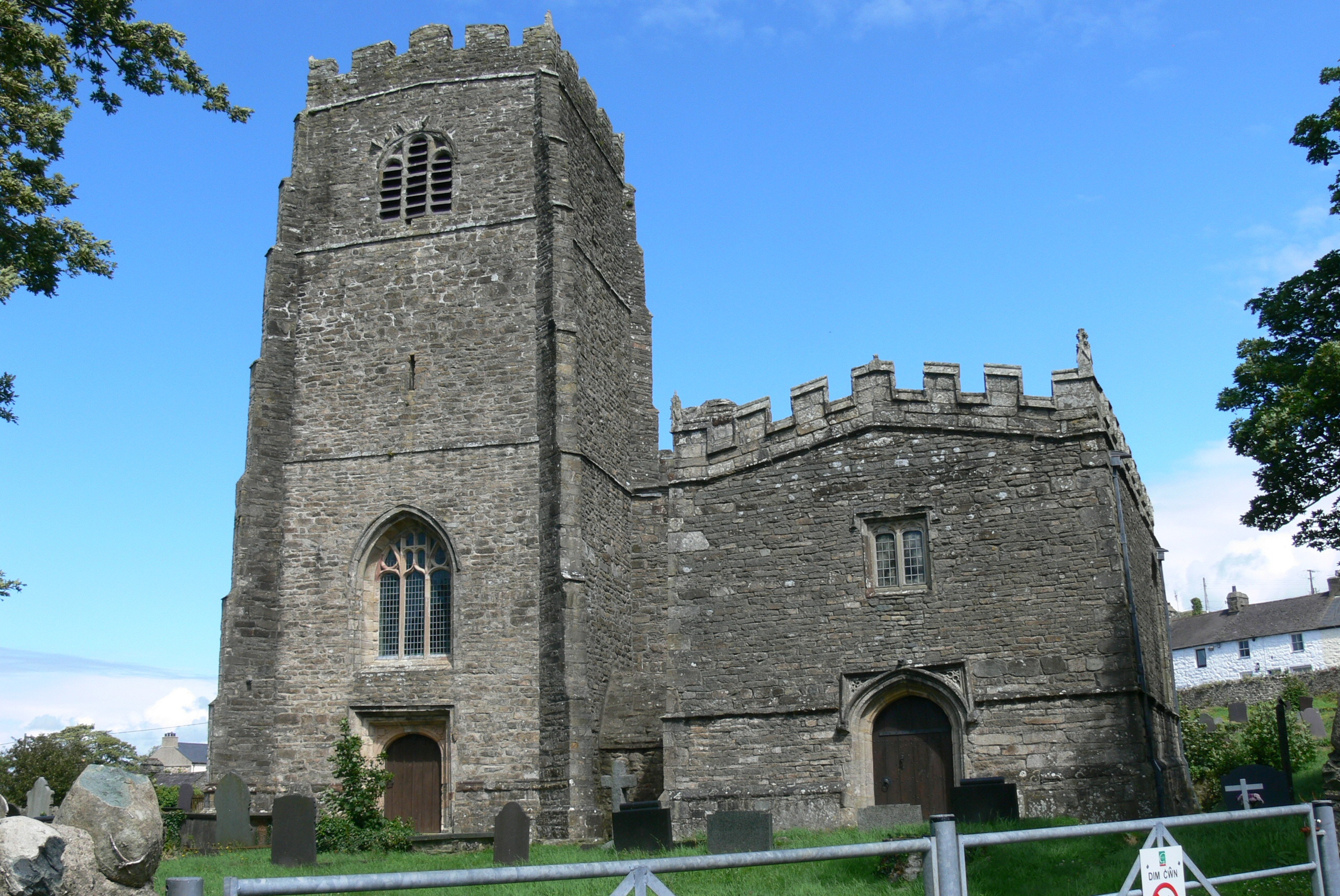
- St Beuno's church (left) and chapel (right) at Clynnog in Gwynedd
- Born: late 6th century Powys
- Died: 21 April 640; Clynnog Fawr
- Venerated in: Orthodox Christianity; Roman Catholism; Anglicanism
- Canonized: Pre-congregation
- Major shrine: Clynnog Fawr
- Feast: 21 April (trad.); 20 April (Cath.)
- Attributes: Monastic habit, insignia of an abbot
- Patronage: sick children; against diseased cattle

Saint Beuno (Latin: Bonus; d. 640), sometimes anglicized as Bono, was a 7th-century Welsh abbot, confessor, and saint. Baring-Gould gives St Beuno's date of death as 21 April 640, making that date his traditional feastday. In the current Roman Catholic liturgical calendar for Wales, he is commemorated on 20 April, the 21st being designated for Saint Anselm.

== Name ==
His name has been reconstructed as *Bou[g]nou in Old Welsh, with a proposed derivation from the common Celtic *Bou[o]-gnāw-, with a meaning related to "Knowing Cattle".

== Life ==
Beuno was said to have been born at Berriew in Powys and to have been the grandson of a prince of the local dynasty, which descended from Vortigern, king of Britain. After education and ordination in the monastery at Bangor in northern Wales, he became an active missionary with the support of Cadfan, king of Gwynedd. Cadfan's son and successor Cadwallon deceived Beuno about some land and, when the saint demanded justice, proved unsympathetic. Thereupon, Cadwallon's cousin Gwyddaint "gave to God and Beuno forever" his land at Clynnog Fawr on the Llŷn peninsula. Beuno established his own monastery at the site and died there peacefully "on the seventh day of Easter".

== Miracles ==
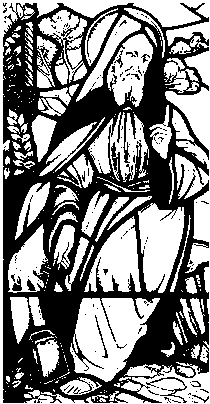
Drawing of a stained glass window depicting Saint Beuno

Beuno was credited with raising seven people from the dead, including his niece, the virgin Winefride (Gwenffrewi), and his disciple and cousin, Aelhaiarn. He was said to have had a "wondrous vision" prior to his death.

== Legacy ==
Eleven churches bear Saint Beuno's name, including one in his monastery at Clynnog Fawr, and one in Culbone on the Somerset coast. Although his establishment at Clynnog is destroyed, his grave chapel survives. In Tremeirchion, near St Asaph, is St Beuno's, a former theological college and now a Jesuit spirituality retreat centre.

== See also ==
- St Beuno's Church, Aberffraw
- St Beuno's Church, Berriew
- St Beuno's Church, Bettws Cedewain
- St Beuno's Church, Botwnnog
- St Beuno's Church, Culbone
- St Beuno's Church, Llanycil
- St Beuno's Church, Penmorfa
- St Beuno's Church, Pistyll
- St Beuno's Church, Trefdraeth
