= Trefdraeth =

Hamlet in Anglesey, Wales

Coordinates: 53.205°N 4.388°W

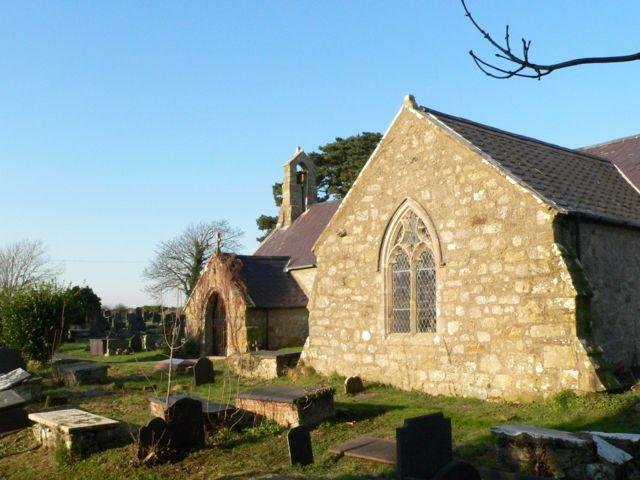
- St Beuno's parish church

- Location within Anglesey
- OS grid reference: SH406702
- Community: Bodorgan
- Principal area: Anglesey
- Preserved county: Gwynedd
- Country: Wales
- Sovereign state: United Kingdom
- Post town: Llangefni
- Postcode district: LL62
- Police: North Wales
- Fire: North Wales
- Ambulance: Welsh
- UK Parliament: Ynys Môn
- Senedd Cymru – Welsh Parliament: Bangor Conwy Môn

Trefdraeth is a hamlet in Anglesey, Wales, within the community of Bodorgan about 5 miles (8 km) southwest of the county town of Llangefni. Until 1984 Trefdraeth was its own community.

Trefdraeth's Church in Wales parish church of St Beuno dates from the 13th century.

Glantraeth Football Club play their home games in Trefdraeth. They are the only club on Anglesey to have won a Cymru Alliance league and cup double, the second tier of Welsh football.

== Notable people ==
- William Williams (1739–1817), a Welsh antiquarian and poet.
- John Owen Jones (1861–1899), (known as Ap Ffarmwr) a campaigning journalist, was born at Ty'n y Morfa, Trefdraeth.
- Naomi Watts (born 1968), who lived locally as a child, is president of Glantraeth F.C.
