= St Beuno's Church, Aberffraw =

Church in Anglesey, Wales

Coordinates: 53.190715°N 4.466638°W

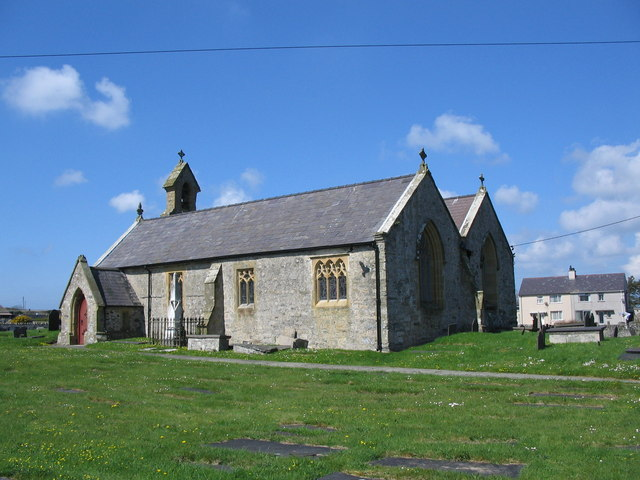
- A view from the south-east

- Location in Anglesey
- Location: Aberffraw, Anglesey
- Country: Wales
- Denomination: Church in Wales

History
- Status: Church
- Founded: 7th century
- Founder: St Beuno
- Dedication: St Beuno

Architecture
- Functional status: Active
- Heritage designation: Grade II*
- Designated: 5 April 1971
- Architect(s): Thomas Jones (1840 restoration); Henry Kennedy (1868 rebuilding)
- Style: Late Decorated

Specifications
- Length: 30 ft (9.1 m) (nave)
- Materials: Rubble masonry dressed with sandstone; slate roof

Administration
- Province: Province of Wales
- Diocese: Diocese of Bangor
- Archdeaconry: Bangor
- Deanery: Malltraeth
- Parish: Trefdraeth with Aberffraw with Llangadwaladr with Cerrigceinwen

Clergy
- Vicar: Vacant

St Beuno's Church, Aberffraw is a 12th-century parish church in Anglesey, north Wales. A church was established in Aberffraw in the 7th century by St Beuno, who became the abbot of Clynnog Fawr, Gwynedd. St Beuno's may have been used as a royal chapel during the early Middle Ages, as the Princes of Gwynedd had a royal court in Aberffraw, as part of the Kingdom of Gwynedd. The oldest parts of the church date from the 12th century, although it was considerably enlarged in the 16th century when a second nave was built alongside the existing structure, with the wall in between replaced by an arcade of four arches. Restoration work in 1840 uncovered a 12th-century arch in the west wall, which may have been the original chancel arch or a doorway to a western tower that has been lost. The church also has a 13th-century font, some memorials from the 18th century, and two 18th-century copper collecting shovels.

The church is still used for worship by the Church in Wales, one of four in a combined parish. As of 2013, the parish is without an incumbent priest. St Beuno's is a Grade II* listed building, a national designation given to "particularly important buildings of more than special interest", in particular because it is a "rare Anglesey example of a double-naved church", with elements including the "unusually fine" 12th-century arch. A 2009 guide to the buildings of the region says that St Beuno's contains "some of the most significant Romanesque work on the island".

== History and location ==
St Beuno's Church is in Aberffraw on the south-west coast of Anglesey, north Wales. It is set within a large churchyard in the south-west of the village, on the south side of Church Street. The first church community was established in Aberffraw in the 7th century by St Beuno (a Welsh holy man who became the abbot of Clynnog Fawr, on the Llŷn Peninsula in Gwynedd). No part of a structure from that period survives; the oldest parts of the present building are the south wall of the nave and some parts of the west wall, which are from the 12th century.

Some work was carried out in the late 13th or the 14th century, which is the period ascribed to the doorway on the south side. The church was enlarged in the 16th century when a second aisle was erected on the north side of the church, running the length of the building, with an arcade of four arches added between the old and new parts of the building. Some restoration was undertaken in 1840, under the Chester-based architect Thomas Jones. During this work, the rector Hugh Wynne Jones discovered a blocked 12th-century arch set into the west wall. It is thought by some writers to be the original chancel arch, but it has also been suggested that it was the entrance to a tower at the west end, which was said in 1833 to have once existed.

In 1868, the chancel and north aisle walls were rebuilt, a porch was added on the south side and a vestry added on the north side in place of one within the north aisle that Thomas Jones had created in 1840. The work was carried out by Henry Kennedy, the architect of the Diocese of Bangor.

Aberffraw became the principal court of the Princes of Gwynedd in the early Middle Ages, and St Beuno's may have been used as a royal chapel. It is still used for worship by the Church in Wales, and is one of four churches in the combined benefice of Trefdraeth with Aberffraw with Llangadwaladr with Cerrigceinwen. It is within the deanery of Malltraeth, the archdeaconry of Bangor and the Diocese of Bangor. As of 2013, there is no incumbent priest in the parish.

== Architecture and fittings ==
The church is built in Late Decorated style from rubble masonry dressed with sandstone, with rendering on the outside of the wall at the west end. Each wall has an external buttress in the centre. The gabled roofs above the nave and north aisle are made of slate with stone copings; there is a stone bellcote with two bells at the west end between the two gables. Both bells are dated 1896 and inscribed with the name "Charles Carr-Smethwick"; they are hung one above the other rather than side by side. There is a stone cross on top of the bellcote and each gable.

St Beuno's is entered through the porch in the south-west corner of the nave, which leads to an inner doorway set in a pointed arch. The 19th-century vestry is reached through a doorway in the north-west corner of the church. The nave, which measures 30 by 16 feet (9.1 by 4.9 m), and the north aisle each have roofs of 6 bays with exposed rafters. The central arcade has four arches supported by octagonal piers. The two arches to the east are to the north side of the chancel, which is slightly smaller than the nave at 25 by 16 feet (7.6 by 4.9 m); the other two are on the north side of the nave. The reset 12th-century arch in the west wall is decorated with chevrons and the heads of 25 rams and bulls. There is no structural division between the nave and the chancel, but the south sanctuary (at the east end of the chancel) is raised by two steps and is marked out by a communion rail. The sanctuary floor is decorated with encaustic tiles, and panelling has been placed behind the altar as a reredos. The sanctuary at the east end of the north aisle also has two steps leading up to it, but its floor is wooden. The altar in the north sanctuary is from the early part of the 20th century, and has a copper panel depicting the Last Supper.

The windows in the north and south walls are set in square frames, and are either two or three lights (sections of window separated by mullions) decorated with tracery at the top; they date from Kennedy's work in 1868. The window at the eastern end of the south wall has three lights with tracery, set in a pointed arch frame with a plain hoodmould around it. The two windows at the west end have single lights topped with tracery; the windows at the east end have three lights, tracery and hoodmoulds. Five of the windows, including the main east window, have stained glass by the London artist E. R. Suffling; the east window in the north aisle, by C. A. Gibbs (1849) depicts the Good Samaritan.

The large octagonal font dates from the 13th century. The south side of the church has memorials from the 18th century to Henry Morris, Rector of Llanfachraeth, and his sons Richard and Owen, and also some 19th-century memorials. A survey in 1937 by the Royal Commission on Ancient and Historical Monuments in Wales and Monmouthshire also noted a memorial to Hugh Wynne, who died in 1714: he was Chancellor of Bangor Cathedral and rector of Aberffraw and Trefdraeth. Two copper collecting shovels with wooden handles were given to St Beuno's in 1777 by Hugh Williams, the rector.

A survey of church plate within the Bangor diocese in 1906 recorded a plain silver chalice dated 1866–67, and a silver paten with an inscription recording that it was a gift from Sir Arthur Owen in 1753. The author commented that the nearby church of St Cadwaladr, Llangadwaladr had an "exactly similar dish" from the same donor. He also noted that church records from 1793, 1801 and 1808 showed that a silver chalice belonging to the church had been lost, as had a pewter paten and flagon.

== Churchyard ==
Against the west boundary of the churchyard are situated the Commonwealth war graves of a Royal Welsh Fusiliers soldier and two merchant seamen of World War I.

== Assessment ==
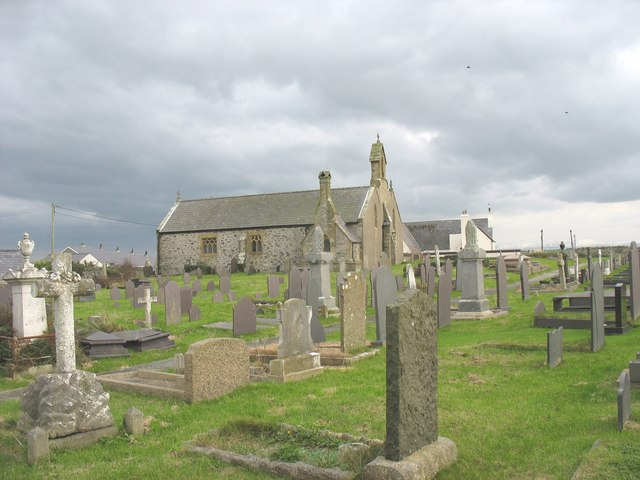
A view of the northern side of the church

The church is a Grade II* listed building – the second-highest of the three grades of listing, designating "particularly important buildings of more than special interest". It was given this status on 5 April 1971, and has been listed because it is "a rare Anglesey example of a double-naved church". Enlargement by adding a second nave was not as common in Anglesey as elsewhere in Wales: St Beuno's is one of three examples on the island (the others being the old church of St Nidan, Llanidan and St Cwyfan's, Llangwyfan). Cadw (the Welsh Government body responsible for the built heritage of Wales) notes that while St Beuno's is "largely of late Medieval character", it retains "significant elements of a much earlier building including an unusually fine 12th-century chancel arch." It also comments that restorations have respected the "predominantly 16th-century character" of the church.

Writing in 1846, the clergyman and antiquarian Harry Longueville Jones said that "the whole edifice has been lately repaired, new-roofed, and in various respects altered, so that some of its original features are now scarcely to be conjectured." He compared the arches in the arcade to those of two other churches in the vicinity, St Cwyfan's and St Morhaiarn's, and suggested they were both the work of the same architect. He also said that the doorway (as he described the arch in the west wall) was "richly ornamented", and commented that it had been "most judiciously uncovered" during the 1840 repairs.

The Welsh politician and church historian Sir Stephen Glynne visited the church in September 1848. He said that parts of the church were "late and poor", the roofs were "poor and open" and the woodcarving was "inferior". In 1849, the writer Samuel Lewis described the church as an "ancient structure", and noted in particular its two "spacious parallel aisles".

A 2006 guide to the churches of Anglesey comments that the church has a long history and "is an interesting one to view". A 2009 guide to the buildings of the region says that the church, which it describes as a "wide rectangle", contains "some of the most significant Romanesque work on the island". The memorial to Henry Morris is described as "beautifully lettered".
