= St Beuno's Church, Pistyll =

St Beuno's Church
- Eglwys Beuno Sant
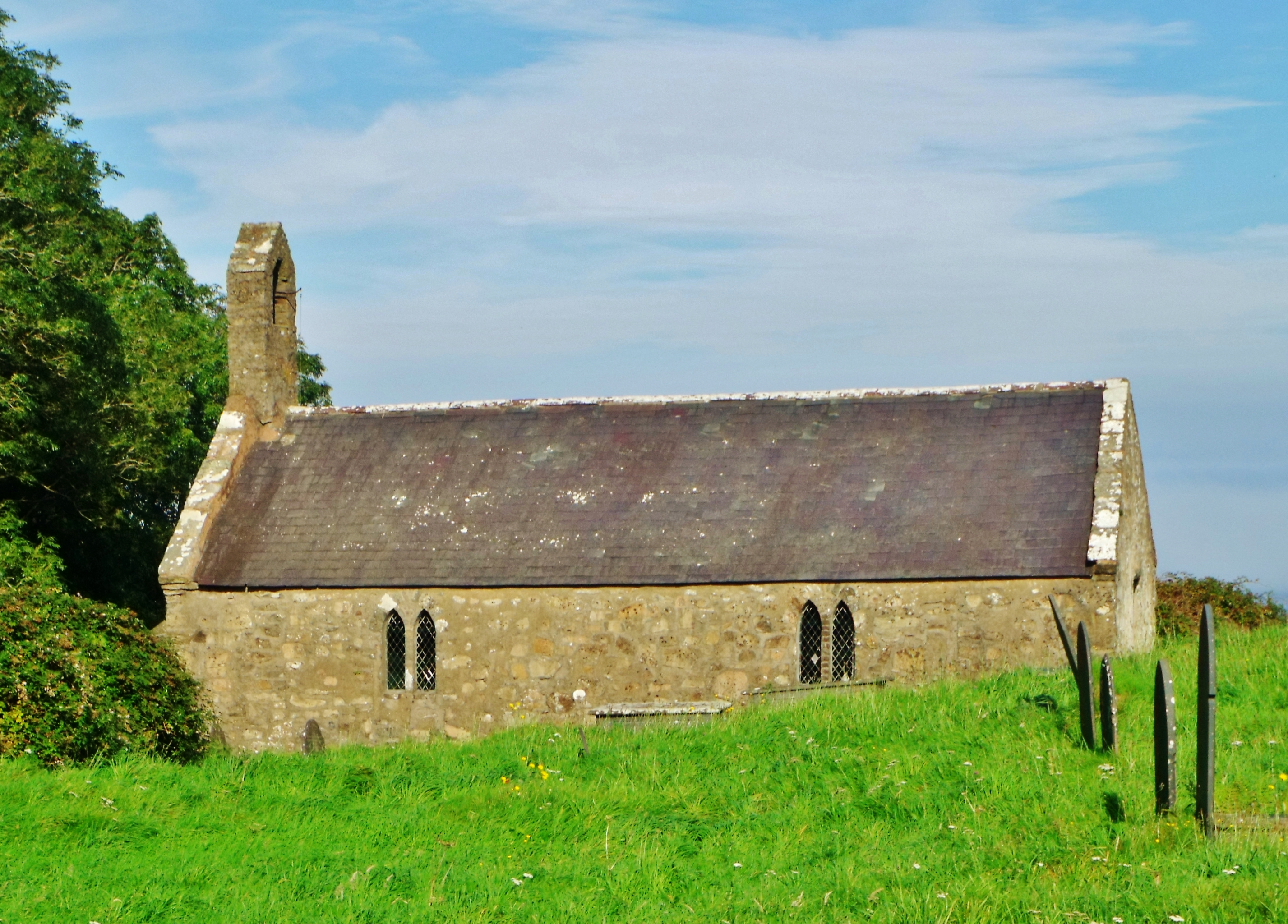

- Location in Gwynedd
- 52.9521°N 4.4898°W
- Location: Pistyll, Gwynedd
- Country: Wales
- Denomination: Anglican (Church in Wales)

History
- Status: Parish church
- Founder: Beuno
- Dedication: Beuno

Architecture
- Functional status: Active
- Heritage designation: Grade I
- Designated: 19 October 1971

Administration
- Diocese: Bangor
- Archdeaconry: Meirionnydd
- Benefice: Synod Meirionnydd
- Parish: Bro Madryn

St Beuno's Church is a Grade I listed building located north-east of the village of Pistyll, Gwynedd, Wales. The church is dedicated to Beuno, a 7th-century Welsh saint.

== History ==
The village of Pistyll stands 1.6 mi (2.6 km) north-east of Nefyn just inland from the northern coast of the Llŷn Peninsula. The church stands to the north-east and is dedicated to Beuno, a 7th-century Welsh saint. The church dates back to the 12th century, but most of the present structure dates to later building campaigns, principally of the 15th century. The church was on the pilgrimage route to St Mary's Abbey on Bardsey Island. It maintains an ancient tradition of scattering the floor with "rushes and sweet-smelling herbs" at Christmas, Easter, and in August.

The church remains an active parish church in the Diocese of Bangor and occasional services are held.

== Architecture and description ==
Richard Haslam, Julian Orbach, and Adam Voelcker, in their 2009 edition Gwynedd, in the Buildings of Wales series, note the church's setting, "on a shelf above the sea". The design is simple — a short, combined nave and chancel with a bellcote above. The building material is of the local rhyolite rubble, and the interior contains an important 11th century font. The Royal Commission on the Ancient and Historical Monuments of Wales (RCAHMW) records the external decoration of the bowl; "Anglo-Scandinavian two strand chain interlace design". There is evidence of wall decoration in the form of biblical texts in Welsh and a painting of Saint Christopher, but these are very decayed. St Beuno's is a Grade I listed building.

== Gallery ==
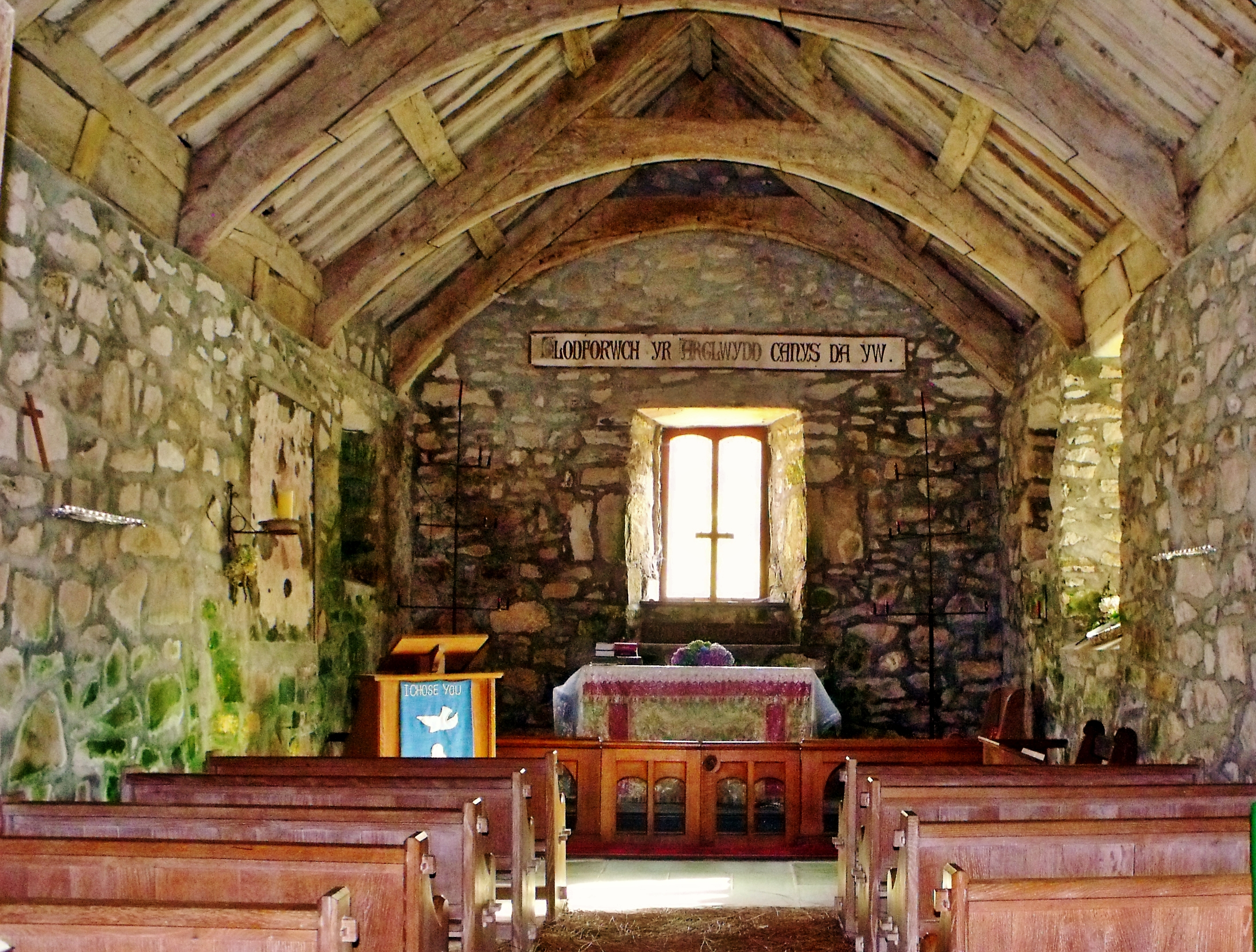
Interior - the floor covered with rushes and herbs

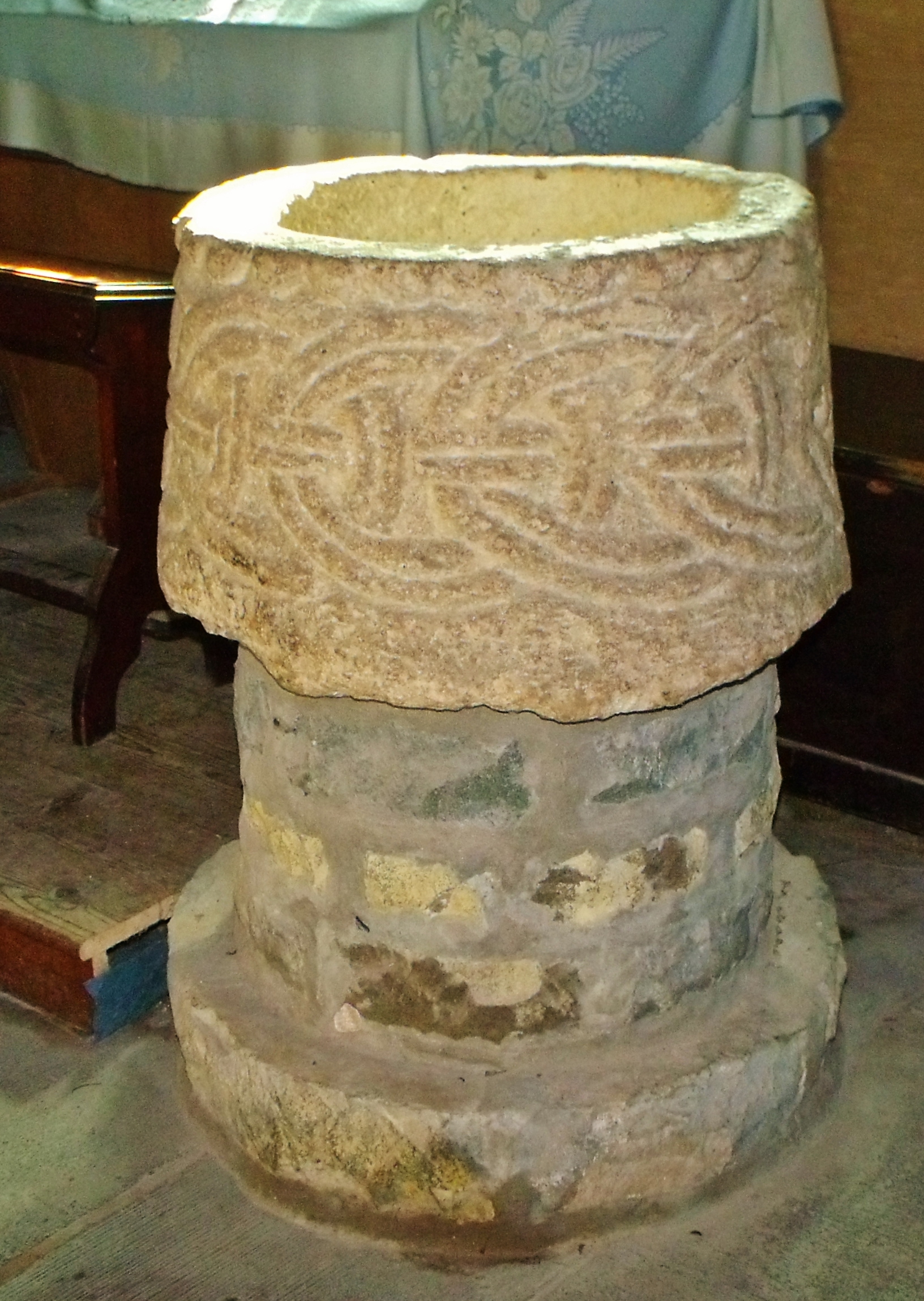
11th century font

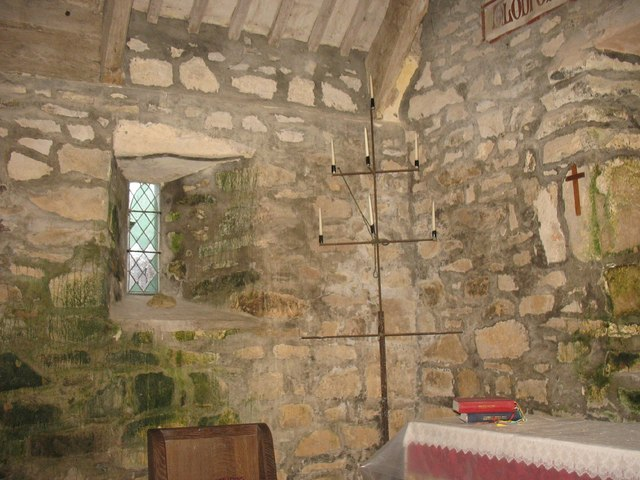
The "Lepers Window"

== Sources ==
- Baring-Gould, Sabine (1908). The Lives of the British Saints: The Saints of Wales and Cornwall and Such Irish Saints as Have Dedications in Britain. Vol. III. London: Charles Clark.
- Haslam, Richard; Orbach, Julian; Voelcker, Adam (2009). Gwynedd. The Buildings of Wales. New Haven, US and London: Yale University Press. ISBN 978-0-300-14169-6. OCLC 1023292902.
