= St Beuno's Church, Penmorfa =

Coordinates: 52.9402°N 4.1721°W

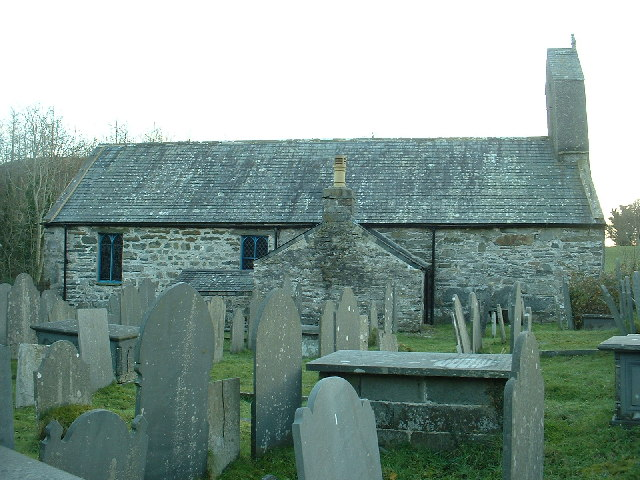
- St Beuno's Church, Penmorfa, from the north

- Location in Gwynedd
- OS grid reference: SH 541,402
- Location: Near Penmorfa, Gwynedd
- Country: Wales
- Denomination: Church in Wales
- Website: Friends of Friendless Churches

History
- Dedication: Saint Beuno

Architecture
- Functional status: Redundant
- Heritage designation: Grade II*
- Designated: 19 October 1971
- Architect: John Douglas (1889 restoration)
- Architectural type: Church
- Groundbreaking: 14th century
- Completed: Late 18th century

Specifications
- Materials: Stone, slate roof

St Beuno's Church, Penmorfa, is a redundant church near the settlement of Penmorfa, some 2 miles (3 km) to the northwest of Porthmadog, Gwynedd, Wales. It is designated by Cadw as a Grade II* listed building, and is under the care of the Friends of Friendless Churches.

== History ==
The church stands on a site first used by Saint Beuno as a cell towards the end of the 6th century. The nave of the present church dates from the 14th century, and the chancel from the following century. The south porch was added in the earlier part of the 18th century, while the vestry was added later in that century. During the 19th century there were three restorations; in 1851–53, 1880 and 1889. The last restoration was carried out by the Chester architect John Douglas. After it was declared redundant, the church was vested in the charity the Friends of Friendless Churches in 1999, who hold a 999-year lease with effect from 19 November 1999. In addition to carrying out repairs, the charity has commissioned a cabinet to contain the church's collection of historic bibles.

== Architecture ==
=== Exterior ===
St Beuno's is constructed in rubble stonework, with a slate roof. Most of it is thinly rendered, and the west end is pebbledashed. Its plan consists of a four-bay rectangle, with a continuous nave and chancel. Near the west end is a south porch, on the north side is a vestry, and there is a bellcote on the west gable. In the porch is a small window on each side, one of which depicts Saint Gybi and the other Saint Cyngar. To the east of the porch are three square-headed two-light windows. In the west end is a square-headed window in the gable, and a round-headed window below; the latter replaces a former doorway. On the north side are two windows similar to those on the south side. The east window has three lights. On the southeast corner of the church is a sundial dated 1816.

=== Interior ===
Internally the walls are plastered above a dado. The chancel screen is Jacobean in style and decorated with arcades. The octagonal oak pulpit is panelled and dates from 1887. The lectern and the font cover were carved by Mrs Constance Mary Greaves, an aunt of Clough Williams-Ellis; the lectern is in the form of an angel with spreading wings, while the font cover is an eagle. The east wall of the chancel is panelled with wood taken from a box pew of 1680. The stained glass includes a north window by Ward and Hughes dated 1896, and a window in the chancel by Meyer of Munich. In the west window is glass dating from the 16th century. The church contains a number of monuments, and a hatchment of 1870.

== External features ==
In the churchyard is a large chest tomb, an early example of the type, in memory of William Maurice who died in 1622. It is listed at Grade II. At the east end of the churchyard is a lychgate, built in 1698 and restored in the 19th century. It is built in stone with a slate roof and has wooden seats on each side. It is also listed at Grade II.

== See also ==
- List of church restorations, amendments and furniture by John Douglas
- St Beuno's Church, Trefdraeth – an Anglesey church also dedicated to Beuno
