= Bishop of St Davids =

Welsh bishop

- Bishopric

anglican
- Coat of arms
- Incumbent; Dorrien Davies

Location
- Ecclesiastical province: Wales

Information
- First holder: Saint David
- Established: 6th century
- Diocese: St Davids
- Cathedral: St Davids Cathedral

The Bishop of St Davids is the ordinary of the Church in Wales Diocese of St Davids.

The succession of bishops stretches back to Saint David who in the 6th century established his seat in what is today the city of St Davids in Pembrokeshire, founding St Davids Cathedral. The most recent former bishop of St Davids was Joanna Penberthy, who retired on 31 July 2023. On 17 October 2023, Dorrien Davies, Archdeacon of Carmarthen, was elected to become the next Bishop; the confirmation of his election (where he legally became Bishop) happened on 29 November 2023 and his episcopal consecration took place on 27 January 2024 at Bangor Cathedral.

== History ==
The history of the diocese of St Davids is traditionally traced to that saint in the latter half of the 6th century. Records of the history of the diocese before Norman times are very fragmentary, however, consisting of a few chance references in old chronicles, such as 'Annales Cambriae' and 'Brut y Tywysogion' (Rolls Series).

Originally corresponding with the boundaries of Dyfed (Demetia), St Davids eventually comprised all the country south of the River Dyfi and west of the English border, with the exception of the greater part of Glamorganshire, in all some 3,500 square miles (9,100 km^{2}).

=== Claim of metropolitan status ===
The early ecclesiastical organisation of the Welsh church is unclear but scanty references reveal that some form of archbishopric definitely existed, with multiple bishops under the jurisdiction of a senior see. One of the earliest mentions of the religious community at St Davids Cathedral comes in the work of Asser who was trained there. In his Life of King Alfred c. 893 Asser clearly describes his kinsman, Nobis, also of St Davids, as Archbishop. In the Annales Cambriae, Elfodd is termed 'archbishop of the land of Gwynedd’ in his obit, under the year 809.

Rhygyfarch's Life of Saint David (c. 1090) states Saint David was anointed as an archbishop by the Patriarch of Jerusalem, a position confirmed at the Synod of Llanddewi Brefi by popular acclaim.

Then, blessed and extolled by the mouth of all, he is with the consent of all the bishops, kings, princes, nobles, and all grades of the whole Britannic race, made archbishop, and his monastery too is declared the metropolis of the whole country, so that whoever ruled it should be accounted archbishop.

Rhygyfarch's claim may be dubious history, but there can be little doubt he was reflecting a pre-existing tradition. It is unclear when St Davids came definitely under the metropolitan jurisdiction of the Archbishop of Canterbury, but about 1115 King Henry I intruded a Norman into the see, Bernard, Bishop of St Davids, who prior to his ordination was confirmed by Canterbury, much to the disgust of the Brut y Tywysogyon which noted that Henry I 'made him bishop in Menevia in contempt of the clerics of the Britons’. Once in place Bernard became convinced that St Davids was a Metropolitan archbishopric (and thus of the same status as Canterbury). Bernard in the 1120s claimed metropolitan jurisdiction over Wales and presented his suit unsuccessfully before six successive popes. Pope Eugenius III was giving the case serious consideration, the issue was to be put to the synod summoned to meet at Rheims in March 1148, but the death of Bernard meant the case lapsed. The idea of Archbishops in Wales was also reflected in the work of Geoffrey of Monmouth. The claim was afterwards revived in the time of Gerald of Wales who pressed it vigorously. The failure of Gerald's campaign saw the claim lapse but it was revived by Owain Glyndŵr's plan for an independent Welsh Church. The idea was also revived in the Reformation: Bishop Richard Davies in the 'Address to the Welsh nation' prefixed to the translation into Welsh of the New Testament by him and William Salesbury referred to 'Archbishop David'. It was only in 1920 that an Archbishop of Wales was re-established.

== Further history ==
The building of the present St Davids Cathedral was begun under Bishop Peter de Leia (1176–1198). In the troubled times of the Reformation the former bishop of St Davids, William Barlow (1536–1548), was a consecrator of Archbishop Matthew Parker in 1559.

At the English Reformation the See ceased to be in communion with Rome, but it continued as a See of the Church of England, and, since disestablishment, of the Church in Wales.

== List of bishops ==
=== Pre-Reformation bishops ===
Accounts of the early incumbents on the list are conflicting.

==== Nominal archbishops ====
Pre-Reformation Bishops of St Davids Exerting Metropolitan Authority
From	Until	Incumbent	Notes
unknown		Saint Dyfrig	Also known as Dubricius. At Caerleon.
unknown		Saint David	Also known as Dafydd, Dewi Sant. Moved diocese to Meneva (St. Davids).
unknown		Cynog	Also known as Cenauc
unknown		Saint Telio	Also known as Eliud, Teilaus
unknown		Saint Ceneu	Also known as Kenea
unknown		Morfael	Also known as Morwal, Morvael
unknown		Haernynin	Also known as Haerwnen, Haernunen, Haernurier
unknown		Elwaed	Also known as Elfaed, Elvaeth, Elbodus of Gwynedd
unknown		Gurnuru	Also known as Gwrnwen, Gurnuen, Gurnel
unknown		Llunwerth I	Also known as Lendivord, Leudinord, Lendywyth
unknown		Gwrgwst	Also known as Gorwysc, Gorwyst
unknown		Gwrgan	Also known as Gogan, Gorgan
unknown		Clydog	Also known as Cledauc
unknown		Einion	Also known as Anian, Einaen
unknown	c. 809	Elfodd	Also known as Elbodg, Elvoed, Elbodu, Eludoeth, Elbodius, Elffod (may have been also/instead Bishop of Bangor)
c. 809	unknown	Ethelman	Also known as Ethelmen, Eldunen
unknown		Elaunc	Also known as Elanc, Elnaeth
unknown		Maelsgwyd	Also known as Malscoed, Maelskwythe
unknown	c. 831	Sadyrnfyw the Generous	Also known as Sadyrnfyw Hael, Sadwrnfen, Sadurnven, Sadermen, Madenew
c. 831	unknown	Cadell	Also known as Catellus, Catulus
unknown	c. 841	Sulhaithnay	Also known as Sulnay
c. 841	c. 873	Nobis	Also known as Novis, Novus, Namis, Nonis
c. 873	unknown	Idwal	Also known as Etwal, Doythwall
unknown	c. 906	Asser	
c. 906	unknown	Arthwael	Also known as Arthfael, Arthmail, Arthvael, Alhuael, Arthuael
unknown		Samson	Also known as Sampson
unknown		Ruelin	Also known as Ruclinus
unknown		Rhydderch	Also known as Rodherich; as Riderch, placed c. 945–c. 965 after Bishop Morfyw in the Annals of Wales (B text)
unknown		Elwyn	Also known as Elguni
unknown	c. 944	Llunwerth II	Also known as Lunverd, Lumberth, Lywarch, Luvert
c. 944	c. 945	Morfyw	Also known as Morbiw, Morcleis, Morlei
c. 945	c. 946	Eneuris	Also known as Everus or Eueuris
c. 946	unknown	Nathan	
unknown		Ieuan	Also known as Jevan, Evan, &c. In office for one night.
unknown		Arwystl	Also known as Argustel
unknown	c. 999	Morgeneu I	Also known as Morgenveth, Morgeney, Uregeneu
c. 999	c. 1023	Morgeneu II	Also known as Morgynnyd
c. 1023	c. 1039	Erbin	Also known as Ervin, Heurun, Hernun, Herbin
c. 1039	c. 1055	Trahaearn	Also Tramerin, Carmerin
c. 1055	c. 1063	Joseph	Also Joseff
c. 1063	c. 1071	Bleiddud	Also Beithyd, Bledud, Bleddud
c. 1071	c. 1076	Sulien	Also Sulghein, Sulgenius. Resigned.
c. 1076	c. 1078	Abraham	Killed.
c. 1078	c. 1085	Sulien	Restored.
c. 1085	c. 1096	Rhigyfarch	Also known as Rythmarch, Rikemarth. Composed influential Life of St. David. Possibly never consecrated.
c. 1096	1115	Wilfrid	Also known as Griffri
1115		(Daniel)	Also known as Deiniol. Elected but set aside; became Archdeacon of Powys instead.

==== Suffragan bishops ====
Pre-Reformation Bishops of St. Davids Suffragan to Canterbury
From	Until	Incumbent	Notes
1115	c. 1147	Bernard	Chancellor to Queen Adelize; made suffragans of Canterbury; consecrated 19 September 1115; possibly died 22 April 1148
c. 1147	1176	David FitzGerald	Previously Archdeacon of Cardigan; consecrated bishop 19 December 1147 or 1148; died 8 May 1176
1176	1198	Peter de Leia	Previously Prior of Wenlock; consecrated bishop 7 November 1176; died 16 July 1198
1199	1203	(Gerald of Wales)	Also known as Gerallt Gymro, Giraldus Cambrensis, Gerald the Welshman, Gerald de Barri; nephew of David FitzGerald; elected 29 June 1199, but assent refused by King John; continued as bishop-elect until resigned in 1203; died c. 1223
1203	1214	Geoffrey de Henlaw	Also known as Geoffrey of Hennelawe; nominated in July 1199, but not consecrated until 7 December 1203; died in office
1215	1229	Iorwerth	Also known as Gervase; elected before 18 June and consecrated 21 June 1215; died before 27 January 1229
1230	1247	Anselm le Gros	Also known as Anselm the Fat, Anselm de la Grace, Anselm de Gras; elected before 7 April 1229; received possession of the temporalities 20 November 1230; consecrated 9 February 1231; died March 1247
1248	1256	Thomas Wallensis	Also known as Thomas le Waleyes, Thomas the Welshman; elected sometime between 16 April and 16 July 1247; received possession of the temporalities 26 September 1247; consecrated 26 July 1248; died 11 July 1255
1256	1280	Richard Carew	Elected after 4 August 1255; consecrated sometime between 11 February 10 March 1256; died 1 April 1280
1280	1293	Thomas Bek	Also known as Thomas Beck, Thomas Becke; elected before 17 June and consecrated 6 October 1280; died 14 April 1293
1296	1328	David Martin	Also known as David Martyn; elected in June 1293; received possession of the temporalities 11 October 1293; consecrated 30 September 1296; died 9 March 1328
1328	1347	Henry Gower	Elected 21 April 1328; received possession of the temporalities 26 May 1328; consecrated 12 June 1328; died before 4 May 1347
1347	1349	John of Thoresby	Appointed 23 May 1347; received possession of the temporalities 14 July 1347; consecrated 23 September 1347; translated to Worcester 4 September 1349
1350	1352	Reginald Brian	Appointed 11 September 1349; received possession of the temporalities 15 January 1350; consecrated 26 September 1350; translated to Worcester 22 October 1352
1353	1361	Thomas Fastolf	Appointed 22 October 1352; received possession of the temporalities 4 June 1353; died in June 1361
1361	1389	Adam Houghton	Appointed 20 September 1361; received possession of the temporalities 8 December 1361; consecrated 2 January 1362; also was Lord Chancellor 1377–1378; died 13 February 1389
1389		(Richard Mitford)	Elected but set aside by the pope
1389	1397	John Gilbert	Translated from Hereford; received possession of the temporalities 12 July 1389; died 28 July 1397
1397	1407	Guy Mone	Appointed 30 August and consecrated 11 November 1397; also was Lord High Treasurer in 1398; died 31 August 1407
1408	1414	Henry Chichele	Consecrated 17 June 1408; translated to Canterbury 27 April 1414
1414	1415	John Catterick	Appointed 27 April and received possession of the temporalities 2 June 1414; translated to Coventry and Lichfield 1 February 1415
1415	1417	Stephen Patrington	Appointed 1 February and consecrated 9 June 1415; received possession of the temporalities 16 June 1415; translated to Chichester 15 December 1417
1417	1433	Benedict Nichols	Translated from Bangor 15 December 1417 and received possession of the temporalities 1 June 1418; died in office 25 June 1433
1433	1442	Thomas Rodburn	Also known as Thomas Rudborne and Redebourne; previously Archdeacon of Sudbury; appointed 8 October and received possession of the temporalities 16 December 1433; consecrated 31 January 1434; died before 27 June 1442
1442	1446	William Lyndwood	Appointed 27 June and received possession of the temporalities 14 August 1442; consecrated 26 August 1442; also was Lord Privy Seal 1432–1443; died in office 21 October 1446
1447		John Langton	Appointed 23 January and received possession of the temporalities 2 March 1447; consecrated 7 May 1447; also was Chancellor of the University of Cambridge 1436–1445 and 1447; died in office 22 May 1447
1447	1460	John De la Bere	Previously Dean of Wells; appointed 15 September and received possession of the temporalities 14 November 1447; consecrated 19 November 1447; resigned before 23 July 1460
1460	c. 1481	Robert Tully	Previously a monk at Gloucester Abbey; appointed 23 July and consecrated after 28 August 1460; died circa 1481
1482	1483	Richard Martyn	Also spelled Martin; formerly Bishop-designate of Waterford and Lismore; appointed Bishop of St Davids 26 April and consecrated 28 July 1482; also was a Privy Councillor to Edward IV; died in office 11 May 1483
1483	1485	Thomas Langton	Formerly Prebendary of Wells; appointed 4 July and consecrated sometime in August or September 1483; received possession of the temporalities 25 March 1484; translated to Salisbury 8 February 1485
1485	1496	Hugh Pavy	Previously Archdeacon of Wiltshire; appointed 6 May 1485 and received possession of the temporalities the same year; consecrated 9 October 1485; died sometime between 3 May and 3 August 1496
1496	1504	John Morgan	Also known as John Young; previously Dean of Windsor; appointed 3 August and received possession of the temporalities 23 November 1496; died in office sometime between 24 April and 19 May 1504
1505	1508	Robert Sherborne	Previously Dean of St Paul's, London; appointed 5 January and received possession of the temporalities 12 April 1505; consecrated 11 May 1505; translated to Chichester 18 September 1508
1509	1522	Edward Vaughan	Formerly Prebendary of St Paul's, London; appointed 13 June and consecrated 22 July 1509; died in office before 27 January 1522
1523	1536	Richard Rawlins	Previously Warden of Merton College, Oxford and Prebendary of St Paul's, London; appointed 11 March and consecrated 26 April 1523; died in office 18 February 1536

=== Bishops during the Reformation ===
Bishops of St Davids during the Reformation
From	Until	Incumbent	Notes
1536	1548	William Barlow	Formerly Bishop-elect of St Asaph; elected Bishop of St Davids 10 April and consecrated in June 1536; translated to Bath & Wells in 1548
1549	1554	Robert Ferrar	Consecrated 9 September 1548; deprived by Queen Mary in March 1554; burned at the stake 30 March 1555
1554	1559	Henry Morgan	Principal of St Edward's Hall, Oxford; consecrated 1 April 1554; deprived by Elizabeth I in the summer of 1559; died 23 December 1559

=== Post-Reformation bishops ===
==== Bishops of the Church of England ====
Bishops of St Davids
From	Until	Incumbent	Notes
1560	1561	Thomas Young	Previously Chancellor of St Davids; consecrated 21 January 1560; translated to York 25 February 1561
1561	1581	Richard Davies	Translated from St Asaph 21 May 1561; died in office in October or November 1581
1582	1592	Marmaduke Middleton	Translated from Waterford and Lismore 30 November 1582; deprived circa 1590–1592; died in exile 1593
1590/92	1594	See vacant	
1594	1615	Anthony Rudd	Previously Dean of Gloucester; consecrated bishop 9 June 1594; died in office 7 March 1615
1615	1621	Richard Milbourne	Previously Dean of Rochester; consecrated bishop 9 July 1615; translated to Carlisle in 1621
1621	1627	William Laud	Previously Dean of Gloucester; consecrated bishop 18 November 1621; translated to Bath & Wells 18 September 1626
1627	1635	Theophilus Feild	Translated from Llandaff 12 July 1627; translated to Hereford 23 December 1635
1635	1646	Roger Maynwaring	Previously Dean of Worcester; consecrated bishop 28 February 1636; deprived of the see when the English episcopacy was abolished by Parliament on 9 October 1646; died 1 July 1653
1646	1660	The see was abolished during the Commonwealth and the Protectorate	
1660	1677	William Lucy	Previously Rector of Highclere; consecrated bishop 2 December 1660; died in office 4 October 1677
1677	1683	William Thomas	Previously Dean of Worcester; consecrated bishop of St Davids in early 1678; translated to Worcester 27 August 1683
1683	1686	Laurence Womock	Previously Archdeacon of Suffolk; consecrated bishop 11 November 1683; died in office 12 March 1686
1686	1687	John Lloyd	Previously Principal of Jesus College, Oxford; consecrated bishop 17 October 1686; died in office 1687
1687	1699	Thomas Watson	Fellow of St John's College, Cambridge; consecrated bishop 26 June 1687; suspended 21 August 1694 and deprived 3 August 1699 for crimes including simony; died 3 June 1717
1699	1705	See vacant	
1705	1710	George Bull	Previously Archdeacon of Llandaff; consecrated bishop 29 April 1705; died in office 17 February 1710
1710	1713	Philip Bisse	Consecrated bishop 19 November 1710; translated to Hereford 16 February 1713
1713	1723	Adam Ottley	Previously Archdeacon of Salop and Prebendary of Hereford; consecrated bishop 15 March 1713; died in office 3 October 1723
1724	1731	Richard Smalbroke	Previously Treasurer of Llandaff; consecrated bishop 3 February 1724; translated to Lichfield & Coventry 20 February 1731
1731		Elias Sydall	Previously Dean of Canterbury; consecrated bishop 11 April 1731; translated to Gloucester 2 November 1731
1732	1743	Nicholas Clagett	Previously Dean of Rochester; consecrated bishop 23 January 1732; translated to Exeter 2 August 1742
1743		Edward Willes	Previously Dean of Lincoln; consecrated bishop 2 January 1743; translated to Bath & Wells 12 December 1743
1744	1752	The Hon Richard Trevor	Previously a Canon of Windsor; consecrated bishop 1 April 1744; translated to Durham 7 December 1752
1752	1761	Anthony Ellys	Formerly Prebendary of Gloucester; consecrated bishop 31 March 1753; died in office 16 January 1761
1761	1766	Samuel Squire	Previously Dean of Bristol; consecrated bishop 24 March 1761; died in office 7 May 1766
1766		Robert Lowth	Formerly Prebendary of Durham; consecrated bishop 15 June 1766; translated to Oxford 16 October 1766
1766	1774	Charles Moss	Previously Archdeacon of Colchester; consecrated bishop 30 November 1766; translated to Bath & Wells 2 June 1774
1774	1779	The Hon James Yorke	Previously Dean of Lincoln; consecrated bishop 26 June 1774; translated to Gloucester 2 August 1779
1779	1783	John Warren	Previously Archdeacon of Worcester; consecrated bishop 19 September 1779; translated to Bangor 9 June 1783
1783	1788	Edward Smallwell	Consecrated bishop 6 July 1783; translated to Oxford 15 April 1788
1788	1793	Samuel Horsley	Formerly Prebendary of Gloucester; consecrated bishop 11 May 1788; translated to Rochester 7 December 1793
1794	1800	The Hon William Stuart	Previously Canon of Christ Church, Oxford; consecrated bishop 12 January 1794; translated to Armagh in 1800
1801	1803	Lord George Murray	Nominated bishop 20 December 1800 and consecrated 11 February 1801; died in office 3 June 1803
1803	1825	Thomas Burgess	Prebendary of Durham; nominated bishop 25 June consecrated 17 July 1803; translated to Salisbury 17 June 1825
1825	1840	John Jenkinson	Nominated bishop 18 June and consecrated 24 July 1825; died in office 6 or 7 July 1840
1840	1874	Connop Thirlwall	Fellow of Trinity College, Cambridge; nominated bishop 23 July and consecrated 9 August 1840; resigned 16 June 1874; died 27 July 1875
1874	1897	Basil Jones	Consecrated bishop 24 August 1874; died in office 14 January 1897
1897	1920	John Owen	Consecrated 1 May 1897.

==== Bishops of the disestablished Church in Wales ====
Bishops of St Davids
From	Until	Incumbent	Notes
1920	1926	John Owen	The Church in Wales was disestablished in 1920. Died in office 4 November 1926
1926	1950	David Prosser	Consecrated 2 February 1927; also was Archbishop of Wales 1944–1949; died in office 28 February 1950
1950	1956	William Havard	Translated from St Asaph; elected 30 March 1950; died in office 17 August 1956
1956	1971	John Richards	Consecrated 30 November 1956; resigned 31 March 1971
1971	1981	Eric Roberts	Elected 21 April and consecrated 1 June 1971; resigned 30 September 1981
1981	1991	George Noakes	Elected 11 November 1981 and consecrated 2 February 1982; also was Archbishop of Wales from 1986 to 1991; relinquished both posts in 1991; died 14 July 2008
1991	1995	Ivor Rees	Elected in 1991 (consecrated as assistant bishop in 1988); retired in 1996.
1996	2001	Huw Jones	Formerly Assistant Bishop of St Asaph; enthroned in St Davids Cathedral in 1996; retired as bishop at the end of 2001
2002	2008	Carl Cooper	Previously Archdeacon of Merioneth; elected and consecrated in 2002; resigned 29 April 2008
2008	2016	Wyn Evans	Previously Dean of St Davids 1994–2008; elected bishop 1 September and consecrated 29 November 2008; enthroned in St Davids Cathedral 6 December 2008
2016	2023	Joanna Penberthy	Confirmed 30 November 2016; consecrated 21 January 2017; retired 31 July 2023
2023	present	Dorrien Davies	Previously Archdeacon of Carmarthen; elected 17 October 2023; confirmed 29 November; consecration scheduled for 27 January 2024

== Assistant bishops ==
Prior to serving as Bishop diocesan, Ivor Rees was appointed Assistant Bishop of St Davids and Archdeacon of St Davids in 1988, in order to assist Noakes, by then both diocesan Bishop of St Davids and Archbishop of Wales. Rees was elected diocesan bishop after Noakes' retirement.
