= Bleiddud (bishop) =

British bishop

Bleiddud was Bishop of St David's (then known as Menevia) in Wales from 1061 to 1071. Little is known of him. His name is sometimes given as Bedwd.

The name Bleiddud appears to be derived from the Welsh blaidd, wolf, and tud, tribe or the territory of a tribe.

A bishop of the diocese named Joseph died in 1061, and Bleiddud was his successor. He is reported to have been consecrated by Æthelnoth, archbishop of Canterbury, who died in 1038, suggesting that he was translated to St David's having been a bishop elsewhere.

The chapter of St David's, in an address to Pope Eugenius III of the year 1145, stated that a man named Melan of Llanelwy (Melanus Llanelvensis) was consecrated bishop of St Asaph by Bleiddud while he was bishop of St David's. This event has been dated to about the year 1070.

A "Bishop Begard" is addressed in a Coventry writ of Edward the Confessor of 1060, concerning the king's grant of judicial rights to Bromfield Minster in Shropshire, and it has been suggested that this is an error for Bleiddud.

According to the Annales Cambriae, Bleiddud died in 1071 and was succeeded as Bishop of St David's by Sulien. According to the account of Brut y Tywysogion for the year 1071,

1071: Then, a year after that, the French ravaged Ceredigion and Dyved, and Menevia and Bangor were laid waste by the Pagans. And then Bleiddud, bishop of Menevia, died; and Sulien assumed the bishopric.

By the ninth century, and later, the right of the clergy to marry was well established in Wales, and an entry in the Book of St Chad records the grant of freedom to Bleiddud, son of Sulien, this apparently being the Sulien who succeeded Bishop Bleiddud. Gerald of Wales also notes that at the time it was usual for sons to follow fathers in church benefices. The Book of Llandaff, dating from around 1125, also records a "decree of the liberty of Bleiddud and his offspring".
