= Dewisland =

Former Hundred of Pembrokeshire, Wales

Coordinates: 51.948°N 5.141°W

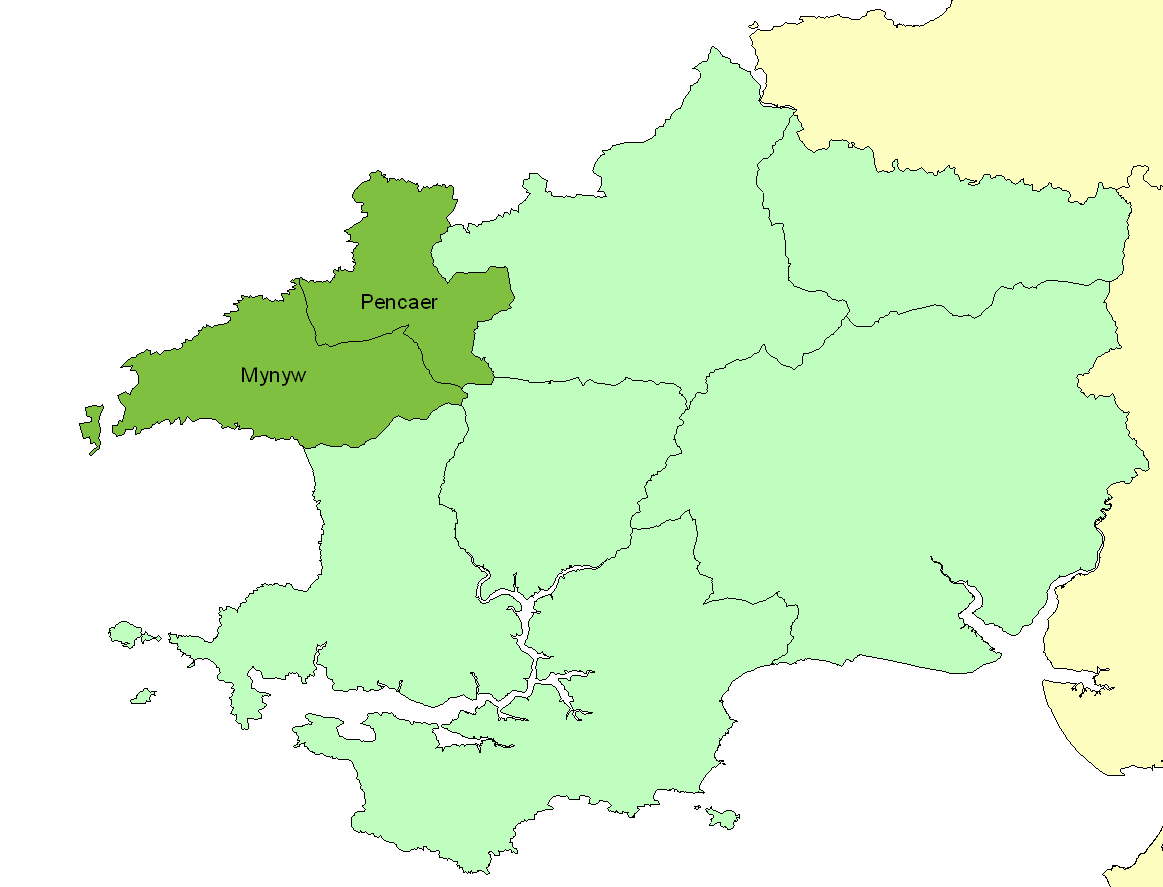
The cantref of Pebidiog in ancient Dyfed

The Hundred of Dewisland (often written "Dewsland") was a hundred in northwest Pembrokeshire, Wales. Formerly the pre-Norman cantref of Pebidiog, it included the city and the peninsula of St Davids. It was named after Dewi Sant, the Welsh name for Saint David.

The Petty Sessions for the hundred were held at Solfach.

== History ==
=== Welsh Bishops ===
Dewisland was almost identical in area to the pre-Norman cantref of Pebidiog, one of the traditional seven cantrefs of Dyfed. It was said to be divided into two commotes: Mynyw (Latin: Menevia) and Pencaer. In the later centuries of the first millennium, Dyfed (including Pebidiog) was subsumed into Deheubarth.

Following the Norman Conquest of England, the ruler of Deheubarth, Rhys ap Tewdwr, accepted the suzerainty of the English king, William the Conqueror, but when William died, Rhys (taking the view that his vassalage was for William's life only.) attacked Worcester (in alliance with other magnates) His land in theory forfeit for rebelling against Norman suzerainty Rhys was subsequently killed in battle at Brecon, and Deheubarth was seized by various Norman magnates.

The Bishop's rights, however, were respected by the Normans, who left Pebidiog alone, thus sparing it the fierce fighting which took place elsewhere. The disestablishment of Deheubarth around it effectively made the Bishop's lands a sovereign state—Dewisland—which was able to boast of being the only Welsh realm never conquered by a foreign invader. It was not a contiguous realm; Llawhaden, a sizeable possession of the Bishop lying elsewhere in Dyfed, also became part of Dewisland, having received the same treatment by the Normans.

Following the incumbency of Sulien, the chapter had begun a pattern of appointing his close blood relatives as Bishop of St. Davids (first Rhygyfarch, his eldest son, then Wilfred, his brother. When they elected Daniel, Sulien's younger son, it began to look like a state with hereditary leadership; King Henry I was able to use the Norman presence around Dewisland to prevent Daniel's consecration.

=== Norman Bishops ===
The King summoned the cathedral chapter of St. David's to London, and persuaded them to choose his wife's chancellor, Bernard as the Bishop, instead of Daniel. Bernard was not even a priest, and following the decision was hurriedly ordained that very day—18 September 1115—before being consecrated as Bishop the following day at Westminster Cathedral. Bernard, newly Bishop, accepted the King's suzerainty over Dewisland (including Llawhaden), whereupon King Henry I issued a charter formally acknowledging it as a Marcher Lordship. As Marcher Lord, the Bishop was almost sovereign - they had judicial powers over all offences (except high treason), could levy tax, issue charters, raise armies, and start wars.

Initially, St David's remained its civil and ecclesiastical headquarters, and small English-speaking communities began to settle there (as they did at Abercastle and Letterston). However, Llawhaden, being south of the Preseli Hills, was a more fertile and hospitable region, and later Marcher Bishops came to base the administration of Dewisland at Llawhaden; by the 13th century, the exchequer, chancery and court of Dewisland had moved to Llawhaden.

=== Pembrokeshire ===
In the 1530s, King Henry VIII began the process of church reform, ultimately along Protestant lines; in 1534, for example, his new Heresy Act made it lawful to criticise the Pope. The following year, he passed the first Laws in Wales Act, which abolished the status of Marcher Lordships; Dewisland was merged with the adjacent Lordship of Kemes and surrounding Lordship of Pembroke to form Pembrokeshire. Though the main part of Dewisland became a hundred (still named Dewisland), Llawhaden was administratively detached from it, and made part of Dungleddy, to which it was actually adjacent.

The Bishop died within the year, and Henry appointed an ardent Protestant, William Barlow, as his replacement. Not content to merely approve these changes to the Bishop's status, Barlow tried to move the see out of St. David's altogether - to Carmarthen.

By now, the former English-speaking communities within St David's, Abercastle, and Letterston had become thoroughly Welsh-speaking, and essentially extinct. The local Elizabethan antiquarian George Owen described the hundred of Dewisland as wholly Welsh-speaking.

=== Modern Marcher Lordship claim ===
In the early 19th century, the Bishop of St. David's established a college (St David's College), to which he granted the manor of St. Davids. By the late 20th century, this college had become part of the University of Wales, and then more specifically the University of Wales, Lampeter. At that point, the University sold the Lordship of the Manor to Mark Andrew Tudor Roberts, who persuaded them to change the sale to that of The Marcher Lordship of St. Davids. Later, in attempting to assert a number of rights, some of which were only held by Marcher Lords, he came into conflict with the Crown Estate Commissioners, and the matter came to court in 2008.

The court concluded that the Marcher Lordship did not exist, having been abolished by the Laws in Wales Acts. Furthermore, even if it had, it was not the University's to sell, and in any case, the sale contract had explicitly spelt out that when using the phrase Marcher Lordship of St. Davids it was using it as a gloss to refer to the Lordship of the Manor of the City of St David's (rather than, for example, an actual Marcher Lordship). As Lord of the Manor of the City of St. David's, a title to which the court found that Mr Roberts was entitled, he has the right of moiety of wrecks on the shoreline.
