= Anselm le Gros =

Bishop of St Davids 1231–1247

- Bishop of St Davids
- See: St Davids
- Elected: 1229
- Installed: 9 February 1231
- Term ended: March 1247
- Predecessor: Iorwerth
- Successor: Thomas Wallensis

Personal details
- Died: March 1247

Anselm le Gros (died March 1247) was bishop of St Davids from 1231 until his death. A kinsman and former clerk of William Marshal, 1st Earl of Pembroke, he had served as treasurer of Exeter Cathedral before his election as bishop in 1229.

== Early life ==
Anselm was the son of William le Gros, steward to the earl of Gloucester, and a nephew of William Marshal, whom he served as a clerk. The identity of his mother is unknown, although she was probably a sister of William Marshal.

Anselm was a canon of Exeter Cathedral. Prior to 1205 he was appointed its treasurer by Henry Marshal, bishop of Exeter and brother of William Marshal.

== Bishop of St Davids ==
Iorwerth, Anselm's predecessor, died in January 1229. Anselm was elected bishop shortly after, and Henry III assented to his election on 7 April 1229. The archbishop of Canterbury objected, delaying his consecration. In 1230 Henry III assented once more to Anselm's election and on 20 November ordered William Marshal, the Earl Marshal, to grant him the temporalities. He was consecrated at Canterbury on 9 February 1231.

In his first year as bishop he renewed the indulgence Iorwerth had issued to the hospital of St Ethelbert in Hereford, granting those who gave alms to the hospital fifteen days' remission of penance. He also consolidated the finances of the cathedral chapter.

Under David FitzGerald the bishop of St Davids had exercised the rights of a marcher lord. In 1241 Henry III reconfirmed these rights, possibly in exchange for a payment of £50 from Anselm to the king. He paid additional money to the king in 1242 to gain custody of his late brother's lands and heirs.

Around 1245 Pope Innocent IV appointed him as a conservator for the bishop of Bath and Wells, during a voting rights dispute between the monks of Bath and the canons of Wells in the election of Roger of Salisbury. Innocent IV also excused Anselm from attending the First Council of Lyon in 1245.

== Death ==
Anselm died in March 1247 and was buried in St Davids Cathedral. He was succeeded by Thomas Wallensis, who after an extended vacancy was granted the temporalities on 26 September 1247. Matthew Paris attributed the delay in appointing Anselm's successor to "war and the death of their prince", though J. Wyn Evans speculates that the vacancy was prolonged so that the king could "enjoy the fruits of the temporalities of the vacant diocese for as long as possible".
