= Lord of the manor =

Landholder of a rural estate

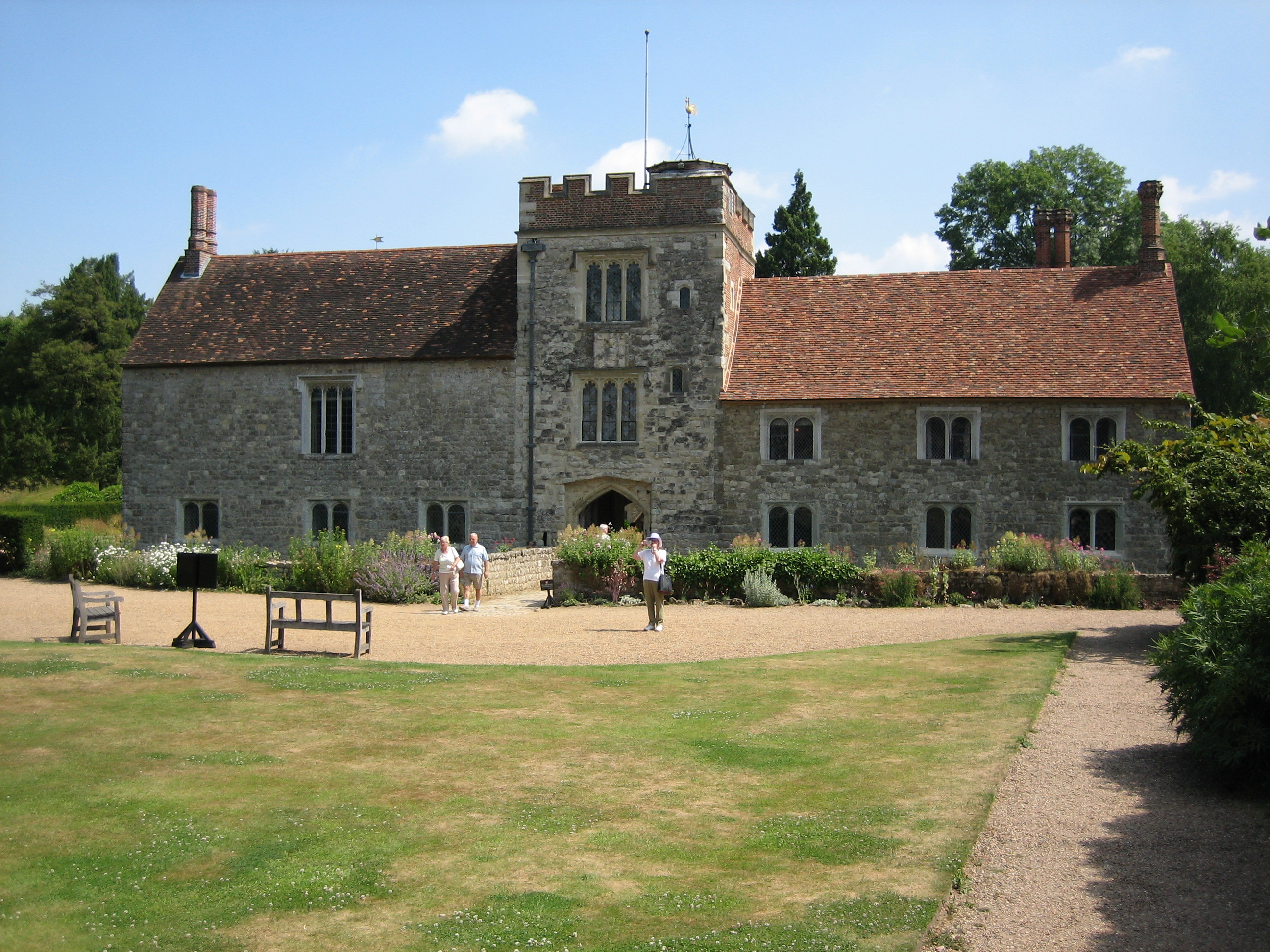
Ightham Mote, a 14th-century moated manor house near Sevenoaks, Kent, England

In Anglo-Saxon England and Norman England, lord of the manor was the landholder of a rural estate. The titles date to the English feudal (specifically baronial) system. The lord enjoyed manorial rights (the rights to establish and occupy a residence, known as the manor house and demesne) as well as seignory, the right to grant or draw benefit from the estate (for example, as a landlord). The title is not a peerage or title of upper nobility (although the holder could also be a peer) but was a relationship to land and how it could be used and those living on the land (tenants or serfs) may be deployed, and the broad estate and its inhabitants administered. The title continues in modern England and Wales as a legally recognised form of property that can be held independently of its historical rights. It may belong entirely to one person or be a moiety shared with other people. The title is known as Breyr in Welsh.

In Scotland, the equivalent title to a Lord of the Manor is Laird, though it carries no formal status in law. Since Scottish baronies were originally granted by the Crown and had privileges such as a seat in the Scottish Parliament, they are not equivalent to English Lords of the Manor. In the British Crown Dependencies of Jersey and Guernsey the equivalent title is Seigneur.

A similar concept of such a lordship is known in French as Sieur or Seigneur du Manoir, Gutsherr in German, Kaleağası (Kaleagasi) in Turkish, Godsherre in Norwegian and Swedish, Ambachtsheer in Dutch, and Signore or Vassallo in Italian.

== Background ==
The manor formed the basic unit of land ownership within the baronial system. Initially in England the feudal "baronial" system considered all those who held land directly from the king by knight-service, from earls downwards, as "barons". Others forms of land tenure under the feudal system included serjeanty (a form of tenure in return for a specified duty other than standard knight-service) and socage (payment of a fee). Under King Henry II, the Dialogus de Scaccario already distinguished between greater barons (who held their baronies per baroniam by knight-service), and lesser barons (who owned the manor without knight-service). As they held their title due to ownership of manors, and not per baroniam knights service, lords of the manor were in the group of lesser barons. The entitlement or "title" to attend the King's Council in Parliament began to be granted exclusively by decree in the form of a writ of summons from 1265 entrenching the status of the Greater Barons and effectively founding the House of Lords.

Magna Carta (which had been first issued in 1215) had declared that "No free man shall be seized, imprisoned, dispossessed, outlawed, exiled or ruined in any way, nor in any way proceeded against, except by the lawful judgement of his peers", and thus this body of greater barons with a right to attend Parliament were deemed to be "peers" of one another, and it became the norm to refer to these magnates collectively as the "peerage" during the reign of Edward II. Meanwhile the holders of smaller fiefdoms per baroniam ceased to be summoned to parliament, and instead lesser barons of each county would receive a single summons as a group through the sheriff, and representatives from their number would be elected to attend on behalf of the group (this would later evolve into the House of Commons). This meant the official political importance of ownership of manors declined, eventually resulting in baronial status becoming a "personal" title rather than one linked to ownership of territory. The lesser baronial titles, including lordships of the manor, therefore were not incorporated into the peerage. It is understood that all English Feudal Baronies that were not lordships of the manor and had not been upgraded into a peerage, were abolished by the Tenures Abolition Act 1660 (12 Cha. 2. c. 24), passed after the Restoration, which took away knight-service and other legal rights. This left lordships of the manor as the sole vestige of the English feudal system. Like their English counterparts, by 1600 manorial titles in the formerly Norman territories in France and Italy did not ennoble their holders in the same way as did, for example, a barony in these territories.

Lordships of the manor often have certain feudal era rights associated with them. The exact rights that each manor holds will be different: the right to hold a market, a right over certain waterways or mineral deposits are all within scope.

== Types ==
Historically a lord of the manor could either be a tenant-in-chief if he held a capital manor directly from the Crown, or a mesne lord if he was the vassal of another lord. The origins of the lordship of manors arose in the Anglo-Saxon system of manorialism. Following the Norman Conquest, land at the manorial level was recorded in the Domesday Book of 1086 (the Normans' registry in Sicily was called, in Latin, the Catalogus Baronum, compiled a few years later). The title cannot nowadays be subdivided. This has been prohibited since 1290 by the statute of Quia Emptores that prevents tenants from alienating their lands to others by subinfeudation, instead requiring all tenants wishing to alienate their land to do so by substitution.

Lord Denning, in Corpus Christi College Oxford v Gloucestershire County Council [1983] QB 360, described the manor thus:

In medieval times the manor was the nucleus of English rural life. It was an administrative unit of an extensive area of land. The whole of it was owned originally by the lord of the manor. He lived in the big house called the manor house. Attached to it were many acres of grassland and woodlands called the park. These were the "demesne lands" which were for the personal use of the lord of the manor. Dotted all round were the enclosed homes and land occupied by the "tenants of the manor".

== Tenancy ==
In England in the Middle Ages, land was held on behalf of the English monarch or ruler by a powerful local supporter, who gave protection in return. The people who had sworn homage to the lord were known as vassals. Vassals were nobles who served loyalty for the king, in return for being given the use of land. After the Norman conquest of England, however, all land in England was owned by the monarch who then granted the use of it by means of a transaction known as enfeoffment, to earls, barons, and others, in return for military service. The person who held feudal land directly from the king was known as a tenant-in-chief (see also Land tenure).

== Sub-tenancy ==
Military service was based upon units of ten knights (see knight-service). An important tenant-in-chief might be expected to provide all ten knights, and lesser tenants-in-chief, half of one unit, i.e., five knights instead of ten. Some tenants-in-chief "sub-infeuded", that is, granted, some land to a sub-tenant. Further sub-infeudation could occur down to the level of a lord of a single manor, which in itself might represent only a fraction of a knight's fee. A mesne lord was the level of lord in the middle holding several manors, between the lords of a manor and the superior lord. The sub-tenant might have to provide knight-service, or finance just a portion of it, or pay something purely nominal. Any further sub-infeudation was prohibited by the statute of Quia Emptores in 1290. Knight-service was abolished by the Tenures Abolition Act 1660.

== Manorial courts ==
Manors were defined as an area of land and became closely associated to the advowson of the church; often by default the advowson was appended to the rights of the manor, sometimes separated into moieties. Many lords of the manor were known as squires, at a time when land ownership was the basis of power. While some inhabitants were serfs who were bound to the land, others were freeholders, often known as franklins, who were free from customary services. Periodically all the tenants met at a 'manorial court', with the lord of the manor (or squire), or a steward, as chairman. These courts, known as courts baron, dealt with the tenants' rights and duties, changes of occupancy, and disputes between tenants. Some manorial courts also had the status of a court leet, and so they elected constables and other officials and were effectively a magistrates' courts for minor offences.

== Later history ==
The tenure of the freeholders was protected by the royal courts. After the Black Death, labour was in demand and so it became difficult for the lords of manors to impose duties on serfs. However their customary tenure continued and in the 16th century the royal courts also began to protect these customary tenants, who became known as copyholders. The name arises because the tenant was given a copy of the court's record of the fact as a title deed.

During the 19th century, traditional manor courts were phased out. This was largely because by the mid 17th century, large English cities had leading residents such as John Harrison (died 1656) of Leeds, who saw the possession of the manor by only one resident as "giving him too great a superiority over his fellow townsmen, and exposing him to considerable odium". Thus, the Manor of Leeds was divided between several people (shares). This situation could create legal problems. In January 1872, as a group, the "lords of the manor of Leeds" applied to the law courts to ascertain if they could "exercise acts of ownership" over land at a time when manorial rights were being sold to larger city corporations. In 1854, the lords of the manor of Leeds had "sold" these acts of ownership to the Corporation of Leeds, which was the town council for Leeds. Other town corporations bought their manorial titles in the 19th century, including Manchester, where the corporation paid £200,000 for the title in 1846.

By 1925, copyhold tenure had formally ended with the enactment of Law of Property Acts, Law of Property Act 1922 and Law of Property (Amendment) Act 1924, converting copyhold to fee simple. Although copyhold was abolished, the title of 'lord of the manor' remains, and certain rights attached to it will also remain if they are registered under the Land Registration Act 2002. This act ended manorial incidents unprotected by registration at the Land Registry after October 2013. The Land Registration Act 2002 does not affect the existence of unregistered lordships after October 2013, only the rights that would have previously been attached to the same.

During the latter part of the 20th century, many of these titles were sold to wealthy individuals seeking a distinction. However, certain purchasers, such as Mark Roberts, controversially exploited the right to claim unregistered land. A manorial title (i.e. 'lord of the manor') is not a title of nobility, as in a peerage title.

== Use of style ==
The holder of a lordship of the manor can be referred to as Lord or Lady of the manor of [Placename], or Lord or Lady of [Placename], for example Lord or Lady of Little Bromwich; this shortening is permitted as long as "of" is not omitted and the name of the holder is included before as not to imply a peerage. The style 'Lord of the Manor of X' or 'Lord of X' is, in a sense, more of a description than a title, somewhat similar to the term laird in Scotland. King's College, Cambridge has given the view that the term "indicated wealth and privilege, and it carried rights and responsibilities".

It is debated whether manorial lordships can be classed as a noble title, historically holders of manorial titles were seen as people of rank. They are a semi-extinct form of hereditary landed title that grants the holder the rank of Esquire by prescription and are considered high gentry or lower, non-peerage nobility by contemporary heralds and students of nobiliary. Lordship in this sense is a synonym for ownership, although this ownership involved a historic legal jurisdiction in the form of the court baron. The journal Justice of the Peace & Local Government Law advises that the position is unclear as to whether a lordship of a manor is a title of honour or a dignity, as this is yet to be tested by the courts. Technically, lords of manors are barons, or freemen; however, they do not use the term as a title. Unlike titled barons, they did not have a right to sit in the House of Lords, which was the case for all noble peers until the House of Lords Act 1999. John Selden in his esteemed work Titles of Honour (1672) writes:

"The word Baro (Latin for Baron) hath been also so much communicated, that not only all Lords of Manors have been from ancient time, and are at this day called sometimes Barons (as in the stile of their Court Barons, which is Curia Baronis, &c. And I have read hors de son Barony in a barr to an Avowry for hors de son fee) But also the Judges of the Exchequer have it from antient time fixed on them."

== Manorial rights or incidents ==
Since 1965 lords of the manor have been entitled to compensation in the event of compulsory purchase. Before the Land Registration Act 2002 it was possible for manors to be registered with HM Land Registry. No manorial rights could be created after 1925, following entry into force of the Law of Property Act 1922. Manorial incidents, which are the rights that a lord of the manor may exercise over other people's land, lapsed on 12 October 2013 if not registered by then with the Land Registry. This is a separate issue to the registration of lordships of manors, since both registered and unregistered lordships will continue to exist after that date. It is only their practical rights that lost what is called 'overriding interest', or in other words the ability to affect land even if the interests or rights are not registered against that land, as of 12 October 2013. Manorial incidents can still be recorded for either registered or unregistered manors; however, proof of existence of the rights may need to be submitted to the Land Registry before they will be noted and they may not be registered at all after affected land is sold after 12 October 2013. This issue does not affect the existence of the title of lord of the manor. There have been cases where manors have been sold and the seller has unknowingly parted with rights to unregistered land in England and Wales.

== Present day ==
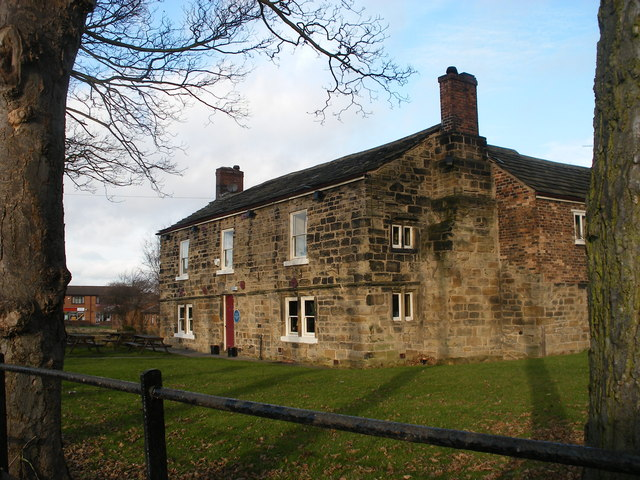
Manor house in Crofton, West Yorkshire

A manorial lordship or ladyship is not connected to the English or British peerage system, but rather is a remnant of the feudal or baronial system that pre-dates it. It is debated as to whether the title forms part of the "titled" strata of the British nobility which is these days predominantly linked to titles of peerage, but the title has historically been associated with the English landed gentry and squirearchy within the context of the class structure of the United Kingdom. The status of lord of the manor is today often associated with the rank of esquire by prescription. Many lordships of the manor are 'held' via grand serjeanty – a duty to carry out certain functions when required – which places them in close proximity to the monarch, often during the Coronation. An example would be the manor of Scrivelsby, where the owner of the manor is required to serve as King's Champion. Additionally, many peers also hold lordships of the manor, and the sovereign via the Duchy of Lancaster is one of the largest holders of manorial titles in the UK. The Dukes of Westminster owe their fortune to the marriage of heiress Mary Davies, Lady of the Manor of Ebury, to Sir Thomas Grosvenor, 3rd Baronet, with the manor of Ebury today forming the Grosvenor Estate. As a feudal title 'lord of the manor', unlike titles of peerage, can be inherited by whomever the title holder chooses (including females), and it is the only English title that can be sold (though they rarely are), as lordships of the manor are considered non-physical property in England and are fully enforceable in the English court system.

Feudal lordships of the manor therefore still exist as of 2023 in English property law, being legal titles historically dating back to the Norman invasion of England in 1066. Being incorporated into property law (whether physical or non-physical) they can be bought and sold, as historic artifacts. The title itself as stated below can be separated from the physical property just as any other right can. Rights like the lordship, mineral and sporting can all be separate from the physical property. Since the 1290 statute of Quia Emptores the title cannot be divided by subinfeudation. Land, sporting rights, and mineral rights can be separated. Property lawyers usually handle such transactions.

There are three elements to a manor (collectively called an honour):

1. the lordship or dignity – the title granted by the manor,
2. the manorial – the manor and its land,
3. the seignory – the rights granted to the holder of the manor.

These three elements may exist separately or be combined. The first element, the title, may be held in moieties and may not be subdivided (this is prohibited by the statute of Quia Emptores, preventing subinfeudation). The second and third elements in contrast can be subdivided. Although manorial lordship titles today no longer have rights attached to them, historically the lordship title itself had the power to collect fealty (i.e. services) and taxes.

The Historical Manuscripts Commission maintains two Manorial Document Registers that cover southern England. One register is arranged under parishes, the other is arranged under manors and shows the last-known whereabouts of the manorial records, the records are often very limited. The National Archives at Kew, London, and county record offices maintain many documents that mention manors or manorial rights. In some cases manorial court rolls have survived; such documents are now protected by law.

Ownership of a manorial lordship can be noted on request in British passports through an official observation worded, 'The Holder is the Lord of the Manor of [name]'.

=== Courts and appointments ===
Most manorial courts are now abolished, however the Administration of Justice Act 1977 made exception for 32 court leets. Their powers are significantly diminished from the era in which they held most power - the Court Leet of Henley in Arden for example is limited to the making of presentments about matters of local concern. There is also the Court Leet of Laxton which continues to oversee the open-field system in Laxton, and the Lordship of Denbigh Estray Court whose jurisdiction relates to return of lost sheep on common land.

Manors may appoint stewards and other officers, though other than those outlined by legislation (such as the Steward of Laxton in respect of the Court Leet of Laxton) functionally these rolls are almost entirely ceremonial. For a Member of Parliament to resign from Parliament, the Crown, acting as the respective lord of the manor, must appoint the member as either Crown Steward and Bailiff of the Chiltern Hundreds or Crown Steward and Bailiff of the Manor of Northstead. This is because an appointment to an "office of profit under the Crown" disqualifies an individual from sitting as an MP.

=== Land claims ===
The issues of land claims were raised in the UK Parliament in 2004 and were debated with a reply on the subject from the Parliamentary Under-Secretary of State for Constitutional Affairs acknowledging "need for reform of the remnants of feudal and manorial law" as a case was highlighted in Peterstone Wentloog, Wales, where villagers were being charged excessive fees to cross manorial land to access their homes.

In 2007, a caution against first registration caused houses to stop selling in Alstonefield after Mark Roberts, a businessman from Wales also previously involved in the Peterstone Wentloog case, registered a caution against first registration for 25,000 acres (100 km^{2}) after purchasing the lordship of the manor of Alstonefield for £10,000 in 1999. Judith Bray, land law expert from Buckingham University, speaking to BBC about the case, said that "the legal situation is very confusing because a piece of legislation in the 1920s separated manorial rights from the ownership of land."

In reports about the Alstonefield case, the BBC stated, "Scores of titles are bought and sold every year, some like the one Chris Eubank bought for fun, others seen as a business opportunity. It is entirely lawful, and there is no doubt the titles can be valuable. As well as rights to land like wastes and commons, they can also give the holder rights over land." The report goes on to say that the Law Commission in England and Wales were considering a project to abolish feudal land law but would not review manorial rights.

In many cases, a title of lord of the manor may not have any land or rights, and in such cases the title is known as an 'incorporeal hereditament'. Before the Land Registration Act 2002 it was possible to volunteer to register lordship titles with the Land Registry; most did not seek to register. Dealings in previously registered manors are subject to compulsory registration; however, lords of manors may opt to de-register their titles and they will continue to exist unregistered. Manorial rights such as mineral rights ceased to be registerable after midnight on 12 October 2013.

=== Mineral ownership ===
There were fears in 2014 and earlier that holders of the manorial rights would allow fracking under the homes and near local communities of people living within the manorial estate after a disclosure that 73,000 applications to assert manorial mineral rights had been received by the Land Registry. Many of the applications received were from the Duchy of Lancaster and the Duchy of Cornwall asserting their historic "manorial mineral ownership".

== See also ==
- Peerages in the United Kingdom
- Squire
- English land law
