= Abraham (bishop of St Davids) =

Welsh bishop (died 1080)

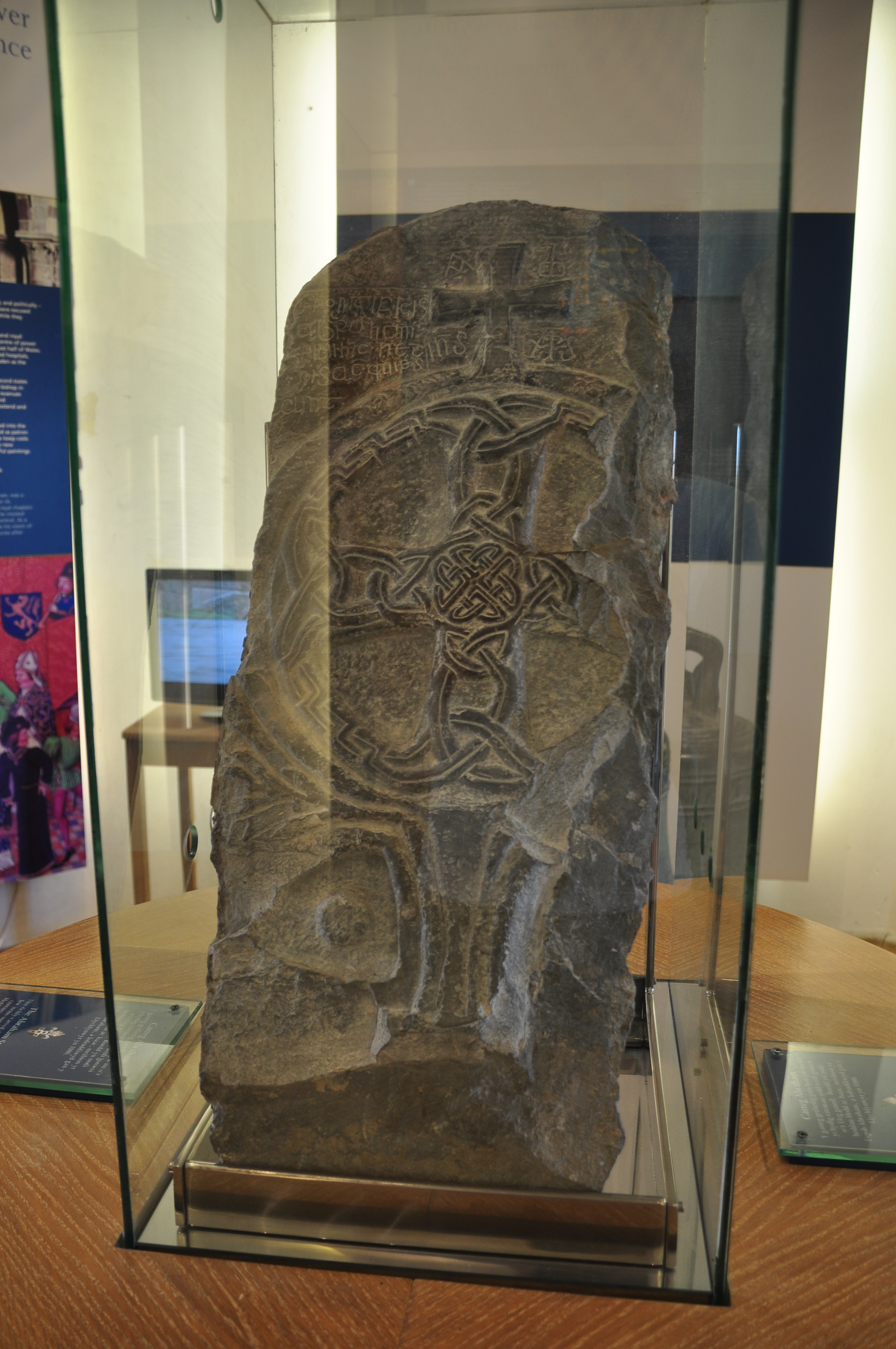
The Abraham Stone

Abraham (died 1080) was Bishop of St David's and the Cathedral Close in Pembrokeshire, Wales from 1078, when he succeeded Sulien, until his murder in 1078 or 1080, during a Viking invasion. (Note: St David's Cathedral states that Abraham was bishop from 1076 to 1078. His year of death as given by the cathedral as 1078 and 1080.) Sulien then served again as bishop.

His two sons, Isaac and Hedd, are commemorated on a c. early-twelfth-century stone cross discovered in 1891 in St David's Cathedral. The Abraham Stone now resides in the Tower Gate House and Bell Tower of the original cathedral city.
