= Mordaf =

Welsh bishop

Mordaf (or Mordaff) was a bishop in Wales during the 10th century.

During the reign of Howel he went to Rome with the Bishops of St David's and St Asaph.
