= Rhydderch (bishop) =

Welsh bishop

Rhydderch (Medieval Latin: Riderch) was a 10th-century bishop of Meneva (modern St. David's).

Most sources place his ministry between Ruelin and Elwyn, but the Annals of Wales place him after Morfyw with his date of death c. 965 under Phillimore's dating of the A text.
