= Government in early modern Scotland =

Political history topic

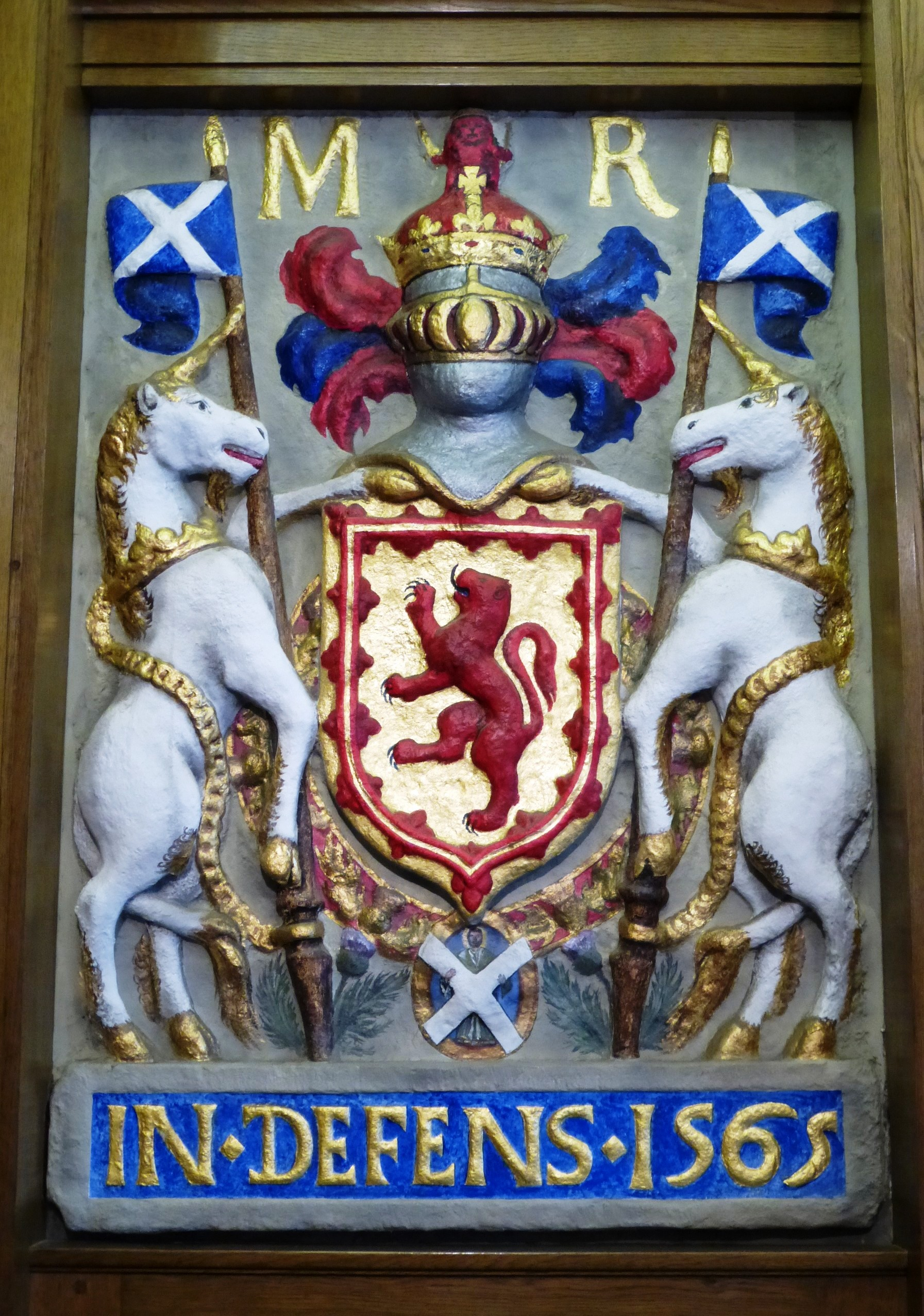
The royal arms of Mary, Queen of Scots incorporated into the Tolbooth in Leith (1565) and now in South Leith Parish Church

Government in early modern Scotland included all forms of administration, from the crown, through national institutions, to systems of local government and the law, between the early sixteenth century and the mid-eighteenth century. It roughly corresponds to the early modern era in Europe, beginning with the Renaissance and Reformation and ending with the last Jacobite risings and the beginnings of the Industrial Revolution. Monarchs of this period were the Stuarts: James IV, James V, Mary Queen of Scots, James VI, Charles I, Charles II, James VII, William III and Mary II, Anne, and the Hanoverians: George I and George II.

The crown remained the most important element of government throughout the period and, despite the many royal minorities, it saw many of the aspects of aggrandisement associated with "new monarchy" elsewhere in Europe. Theories of limited monarchy and resistance were articulated by Scots, particularly George Buchanan, in the sixteenth century, but James VI advanced the theory of the divine right of kings, and these debates were restated in subsequent reigns and crises. The court remained at the centre of political life, and in the sixteenth century emerged as a major centre of display and artistic patronage. The Privy Council and the great offices of state, remained central to the administration of the government, even after the departure of the Stuart monarchs to rule in England from 1603, but they were often sidelined and was abolished after the Act of Union of 1707, with rule direct from London. Parliament was also vital to the running of the country, providing laws and taxation, but it had fluctuating fortunes. It never achieved the centrality to the national life which its English counterpart in England had. The Parliament was disbanded in 1707.

Revenue remained a continual problem for Scottish government, even after the introduction of regular taxation from the 1580s, with receipts insufficient for the business of government and, after 1603, much of the costs being paid out of English revenues. In local government, attempts were made increase its effectiveness, with the creation of Justices of Peace and Commissioners of Supply. The continued existence of courts baron and introduction of kirk sessions helped consolidate the power of local lairds. In law there was an expansion of central institutions and professionalisation of lawyers as a group. Scottish law was maintained as a separate system after the union in 1707 and from 1747 the central courts gained a clear authority over local institutions.

== Crown ==
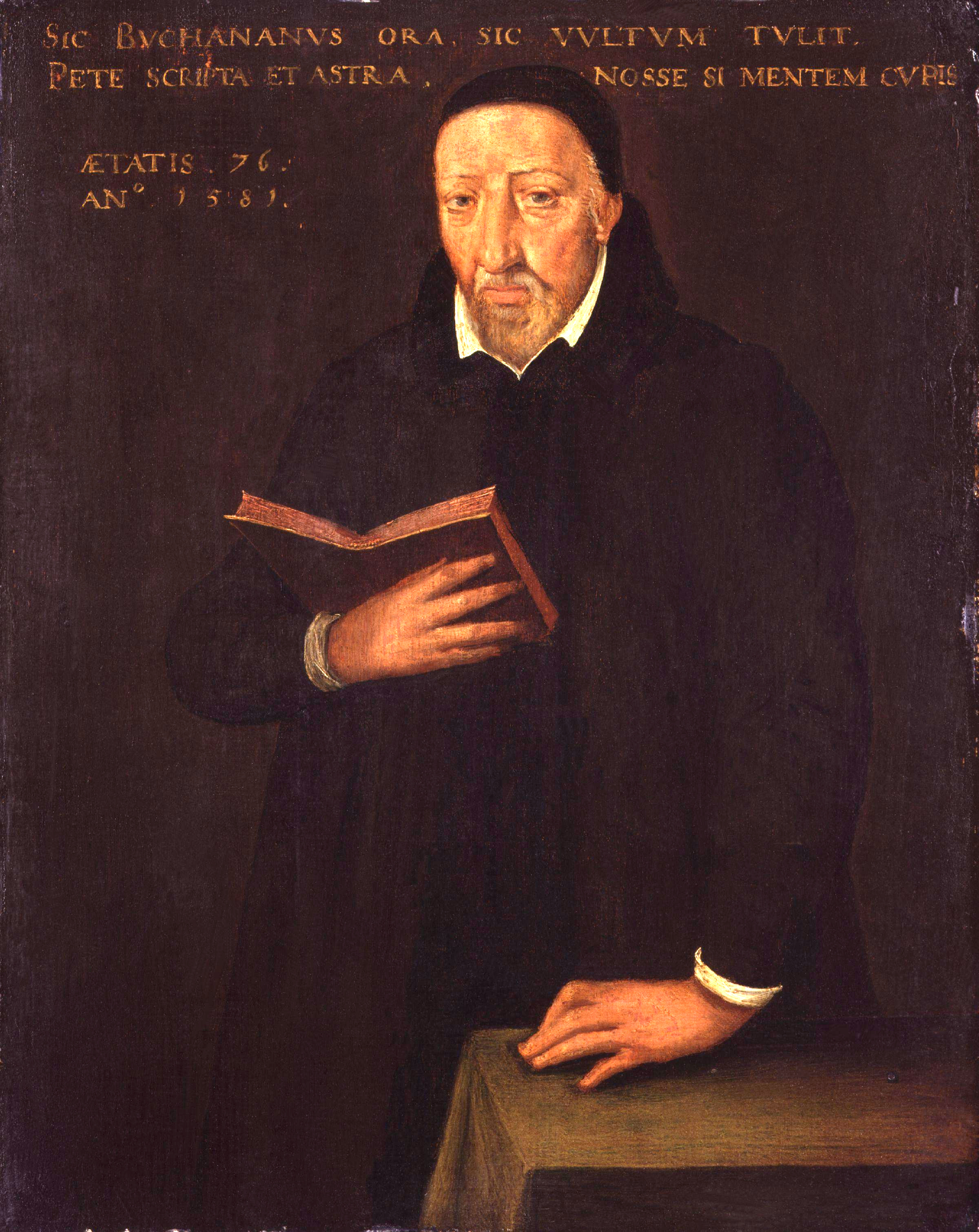
George Buchanan (1506–82), one of the major thinkers of the era on resistance to monarchy

James V was the first Scottish monarch to wear the closed imperial crown, in place of the open circlet of medieval kings, suggesting a claim to absolute authority within the kingdom. His diadem was reworked to include arches in 1532, which were re-added when it was reconstructed in 1540 in what remains the Crown of Scotland. The idea of imperial monarchy emphasised the dignity of the crown and included its role as a unifying national force, defending national borders and interests, royal supremacy over the law and a distinctive national church within the Catholic communion. New monarchy can also be seen in the reliance of the crown on "new men" rather than the great magnates, the use of the clergy as a form of civil service, developing standing armed forces and a navy.

Major intellectual figures in the Reformation included George Buchanan (1506–82), whose works De Jure Regni apud Scotos (1579) and Rerum Scoticarum Historia (1582) were among the major texts outlining the case for resistance to tyrants. Buchanan was one of the young James VI's tutors and although they succeeded in producing a highly educated Protestant prince, who would publish works on subjects including government, poetry and witchcraft, they failed to intellectually convince him of their ideas about limited monarchy and he would debate with Buchanan and others over the status of the crown and kirk. James asserted the concept of "Divine right", by which a king was appointed by God and thus gained a degree of sanctity. These ideas he passed on to Charles I, whose ability to compromise may have been undermined by them, helping to lead to his political difficulties. When he was executed in 1649, the Scottish Covenanters objected, but avoided advancing the sanctity of kings as a reason. In 1689, when the Scottish Estates had to find a justification for deposing James VII they turned to Buchanan's argument on the contractual nature of monarchy in the Claim of Right.

== Court ==
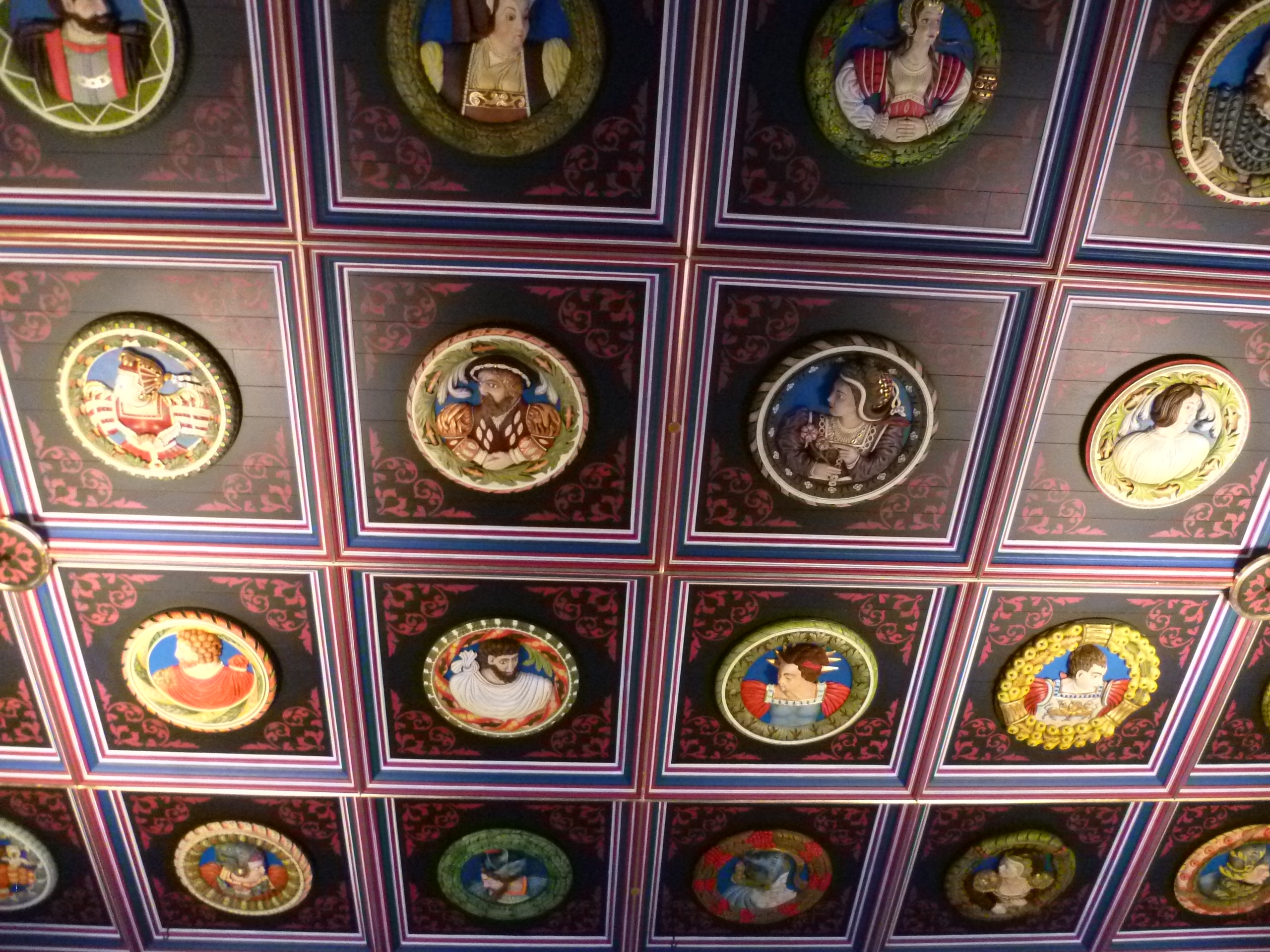
The Stirling Heads, carved roundels on the roof of the King's Chamber in Stirling Castle, include many members of the court of James V

The royal court consisted of leading nobles, office holders, ambassadors and supplicants who surrounded the king or queen. At its centre was the monarch and members of the Privy Chamber. Gentleman of the chamber were usually leading nobles or individuals with kinship links to the leading noble families. They had direct access to the monarch, with the implication of being to exert influence, and were usually resident at the court. Although increasingly based at the royal palace of Holyrood in Edinburgh, the monarch and the court were often itinerant, spending time at one of the royal palaces, such as Linlithgow, Stirling and Falkland, or undertaking a royal progress or "justice ayre" to a part of the kingdom to ensure that the rule of law, royal authority or smooth government was maintained.

In the sixteenth century, the court was central to the patronage and dissemination of Renaissance works and ideas. It was also central to the staging of lavish display that portrayed the political and religious role of the monarchy. This display was often tied up with ideas of chivalry, which was evolving in this period from a practical military ethos into a more ornamental and honorific cult. Tournaments provided one focus of display and were also pursued enthusiastically by James V, proud of his membership of international orders of knighthood. During her brief personal rule Mary, Queen of Scots brought many of the elaborate court activities that she had grown up with at the French court, with balls, masques and celebrations, designed to illustrate the resurgence of the monarchy and to facilitate national unity. Under James VI the court returned to being a centre of culture and learning and he cultivated the image of a philosopher king, evoking the models of David, Solomon and Constantine. Court spectacles included the coronation of Anne of Denmark and the baptism of Prince Henry. After James VI inherited the English throne in 1603 the Scottish court effectively ceased to exist, ending its role as a centre of artistic patronage, political display and intrigue.

== Officers of state ==
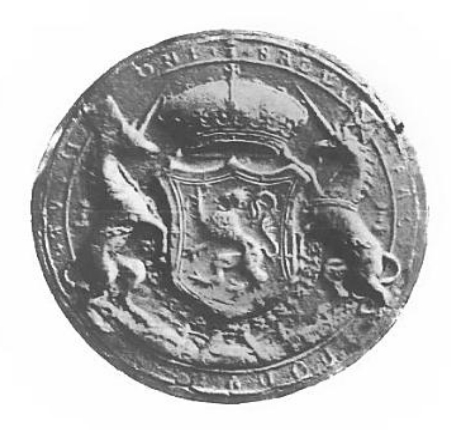
The first Great Seal of Mary Queen of Scots (1542–1567)

The Chancellor was effectively the first minister of the kingdom. His department, the chancery, was responsible for the Great Seal, which was needed to process the inheritance of land titles and the confirmation of land transfers. His key responsibility was to preside at meetings of the privy council, and on those rare occasions he attended, at meetings of the court of session. The second most prestigious office was the Secretary, who was responsible for the records of the Privy council and for foreign policy, including the borders, despite which the post retained its importance after the Union of Crowns in 1603. The Treasurer was the last of the major posts and, with the Comptroller, dealt with the royal finances until the Comptroller's office was merged into the Treasurer's from 1610.

The Lord President of the Court of Session, often known simply as the Lord President, acted as a link between the Privy Council and the Court. The king's advocate acted as the legal council. The post emerged in the 1490s to deal with the king's patrimonial land rights and from 1555 there were usually two king's councillors, indicating the increase in the level of work. From 1579 they increasingly became a public prosecutor. After the union most of the offices remained, but political power was increasingly centred in London. John Ker, 1st Duke of Roxburghe, became the first Secretary of State for Scotland until the post was abolished in 1746 after the Jacobite Rising of 1745.

== Privy council ==
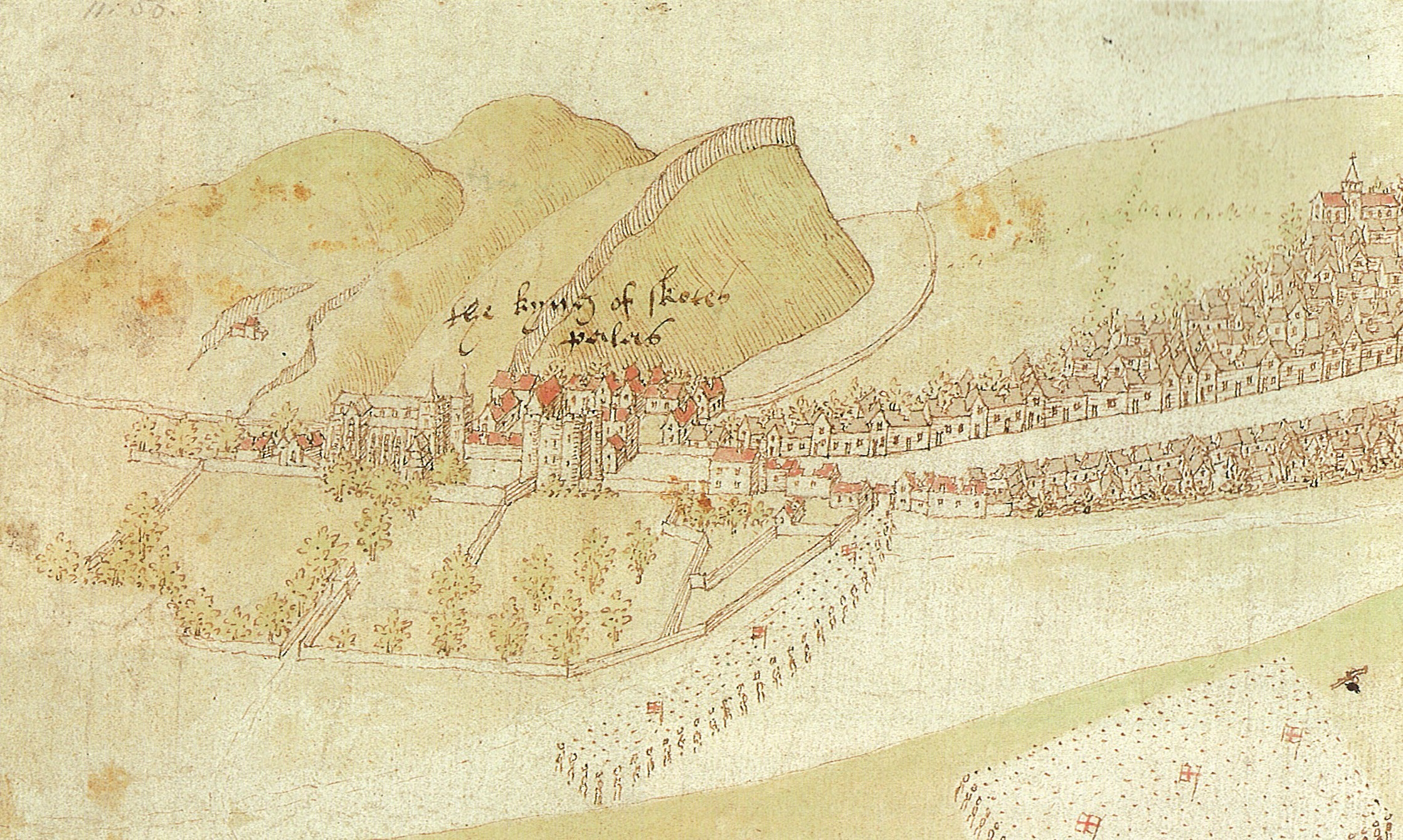
Detail from the so-called 'Hertford sketch' of Edinburgh in 1544, showing Holyrood Palace, described as 'the kyng of Skotts palas'

The Privy Council developed out of the theoretically larger king's or queen's council of leading nobles and office holders in the sixteenth century. "Secret Councils" had been maintained during the many regencies of the later medieval era, but the origins of the Privy Council were in 1543, during the minority of Mary, Queen of Scots. After her majority it was not disbanded, but continued to sit and became an accepted part of government. Until 1707, while in session in Edinburgh, the Privy Council met in what is now the West Drawing Room at the Palace of Holyroodhouse. When the monarch was at one of the royal palaces or visiting a region of the kingdom on official business, the council would normally go with them and as a result of being away from its servants, records and members, its output tended to decrease. While the monarch was away on a holiday or hunting trip, the council usually stayed in session in Edinburgh and continued to run the government.

The Privy Council's primary function was judicial, but it also acted as a body of advisers to the king and as a result its secondary function was as an executive in the absence or minority of the monarchy. Although the monarch might often attend the council, their presence was not necessary for the council to act with royal authority. Like parliament, it had the power to issue acts that could have the force of law. After James VI's departure to England in 1603, it functioned as a subservient executive carrying out his instructions from London. Although the theoretical membership of the council was relatively large, at around 30 persons, most of the business was carried out by an informal inner group, consisting mainly of the officers of state. Before 1610 the council was presided over by the Lord Chancellor, but in 1610 James VI decreed that the President of the College of Justice should preside in the Chancellor's absence, and by 1619 the additional title of President of the Privy Council had been added. The two presidencies were separated in 1626 as part of Charles I's reorganisation of the Privy Council and Court of Session. The Lord President of the Council was accorded precedence as one of the King's chief officers in 1661. After the Restoration, Charles II nominated his own privy councillors and set up a council in London through which he directed affairs in Edinburgh, a situation that continued after the Glorious Revolution of 1688–89. The council was abolished after the Act of Union on 1 May 1708.

== Parliament ==
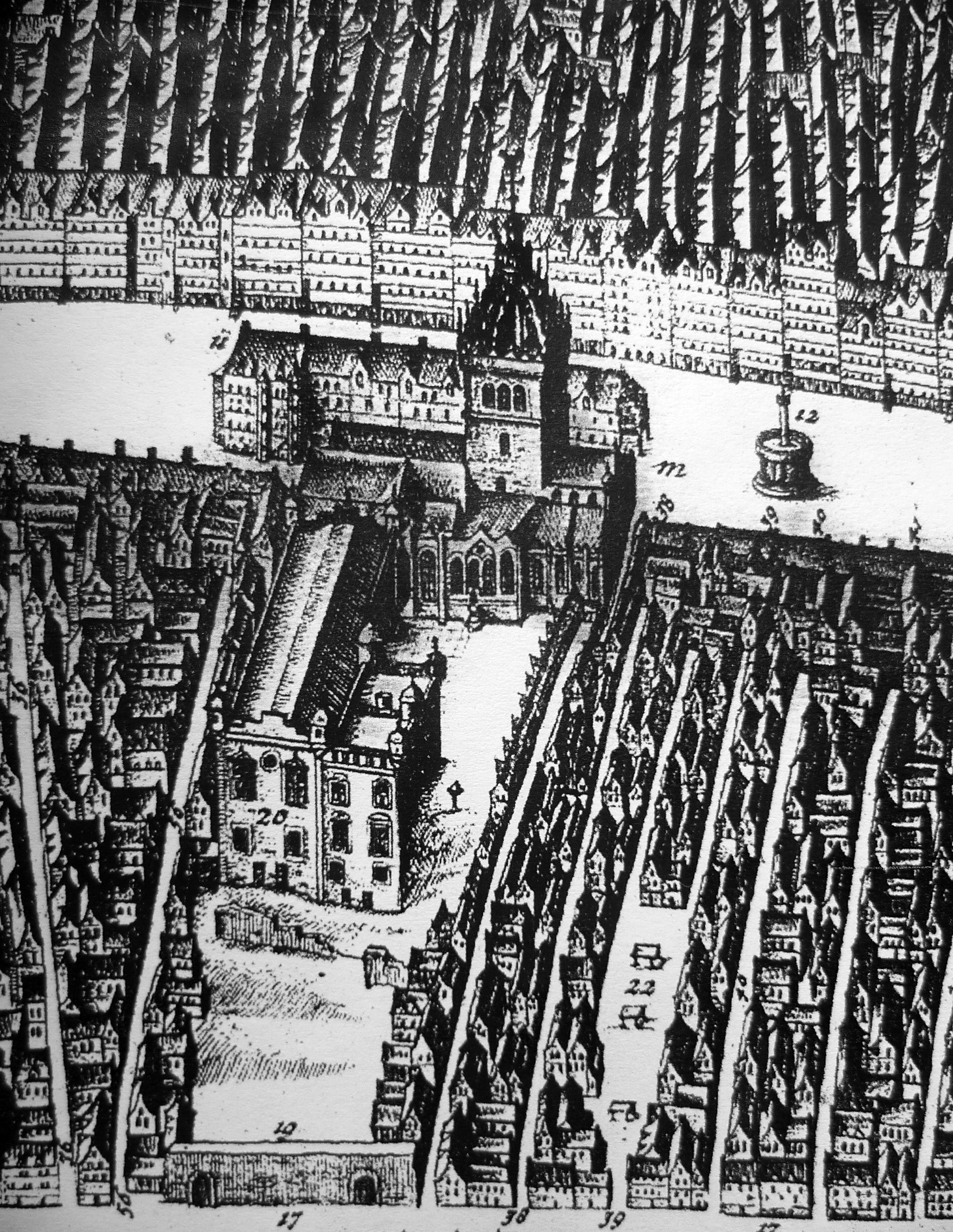
Parliament House, built by Charles I to house the Parliament of Scotland, pictured c. 1647

In the sixteenth century, parliament usually met in Stirling Castle or the Old Tolbooth, Edinburgh, which was rebuilt on the orders of Mary Queen of Scots from 1561. King Charles I ordered the construction of Parliament Hall, at the expense of the Edinburgh burgesses, which was built between 1633 and 1639 and remained the parliament's home until it was dissolved in 1707. By the end of the Middle Ages the Parliament had evolved from the King's Council of Bishops and Earls into a 'colloquium' with a political and judicial role. The attendance of knights and freeholders had become important, and burgh commissioners joined them to form the Three Estates. It acquired significant powers over particular issues, including consent for taxation, but it also had a strong influence over justice, foreign policy, war, and other legislation, whether political, ecclesiastical, social or economic. Much of the legislative business of the Scottish parliament was carried out by a parliamentary committee known as the Lords of the Articles, chosen by the three estates to draft legislation which was then presented to the full assembly to be confirmed. Like many continental assemblies the Scottish Parliament was being called less frequently by the early sixteenth century and might have been dispensed with by the crown had it not been for the series of minorities and regencies that dominated from 1513. The crown was also able to call a Convention of Estates, which was quicker to assemble and could issue laws like parliament, making them invaluable in a crisis, but they could only deal with a specific issue and were more resistant to the giving of taxation rights to the crown.

Parliament played a major part in the Reformation crisis of the mid-sixteenth century. It had been used by James V to uphold Catholic orthodoxy and asserted its right to determine the nature of religion in the country, disregarding royal authority in 1560. The 1560 parliament included 100 lairds, who were predominantly Protestant, and who claimed a right to sit in the Parliament under the provision of a failed shire election act of 1428. Their position in the parliament remained uncertain and their presence fluctuated until the 1428 act was revived in 1587 and provision made for the annual election of two commissioners from each shire (except Kinross and Clackmannan, which had one each). The property qualification for voters was for freeholders who held land from the crown of the value of 40s of auld extent. This excluded the growing class of feuars, who would not gain these rights until 1661. The clerical estate was marginalised in Parliament by the Reformation, with the laymen who had acquired the monasteries sitting as 'abbots' and 'priors'. Catholic clergy were excluded after 1567, but a small number of Protestant bishops continued as the clerical estate. James VI attempted to revive the role of the bishops from about 1600. They were abolished by the Covenanters in 1638, when Parliament became an entirely lay assembly. A further group appeared in the Parliament from the minority of James IV in the 1560s, with members of the Privy Council representing the king's interests, until they were excluded in 1641. James VI continued to manage parliament though the Lords of the Articles, who deliberated legislation before it reached the full parliament. He controlled the committee by filling it with royal officers as non-elected members, but was forced to limit this to eight from 1617.

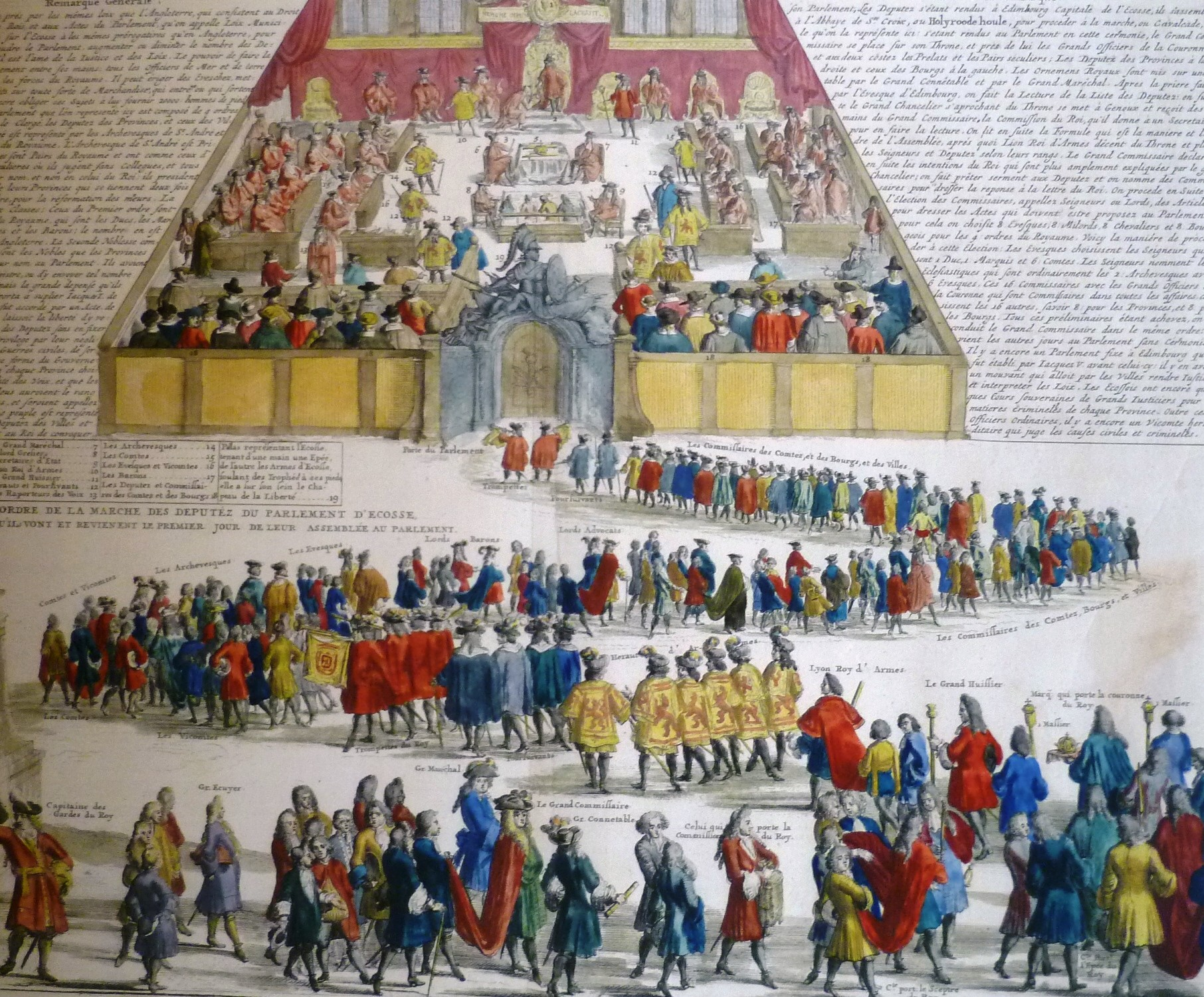
The Riding of Parliament c. 1685, from Nicholas de Gueudeville's, Atlas Historique, ou Nouvelle Introduction à l'Histoire à la Chronologie & à la Géographie Ancienne & Moderne (Amsterdam, 1720)

Having been officially suspended at the end of the Cromwellian regime, parliament returned after the Restoration of Charles II in 1661. This parliament, known disparagingly as the 'Drunken Parliament', revoked most of the Presbyterian gains of the last thirty years. Subsequently Charles' absence from Scotland and use of commissioners to rule his northern kingdom undermined the authority of the body. James VII's parliament supported him against rivals and attempted rebellions, but after his escape to exile in 1689 William's first parliament was dominated by his supporters and, in contrast to the situation in England, effectively deposed James under the Claim of Right, which offered the crown to William and Mary, placing important limitations on royal power, including the abolition of the Lords of the Articles. Rosalind Mitchison argues that the parliament became a focus of national political life, but it never reached the position of a true centre of national identity attained by its English counterpart. The new Williamite parliament would subsequently bring about its own demise by the Act of Union in 1707. The English and Scottish parliaments were replaced by a combined Parliament of Great Britain, but it sat in Westminster and largely continued English traditions without interruption. Forty-five Scots were added to the 513 members of the House of Commons and 16 Scots to the 190 members of the House of Lords.

== Taxation and revenue ==
For the early part of the era, the authority of the crown was limited by the large number of minorities it had seen since the early fifteenth century, with every monarch coming to the throne as a minor between 1406 and 1625. This tended to decrease the level of royal revenues, as regents, lacking the royal authority to create support, often alienated land and revenues, with Margaret Tudor reducing royal income from about £30,000 Scots to £13,000 in the minority of James V. James V was able to extract the heaviest taxation every levied on the Scottish church in exchange for his continued loyalty to the papacy, taking £72,000 in four years. Regular taxation was adopted from 1581 and afterwards was called on with increasing frequency and scale until a demand of £240,000 in 1612 resulted in serious opposition. A new tax on annual rents amounting to five per cent on all interest on loans, mainly directed at the merchants of the burghs was introduced in 1621, but the 1621 levy was still being collected over a decade later. Under Charles I the annual income from all sources in Scotland was under £16,000 sterling and inadequate for the normal costs of government, with the court in London now being financed out of English revenues. The sum of £10,000 a month from the county assessment was demanded by the Cromwellian regime, which Scotland failed to fully supply, but it did contribute £35,000 in excise a year. Although Parliament made a formal grant of £40,000 a year to Charles II, the rising costs of civilian government and war meant that this was inadequate to support Scottish government. Under William I and after the Union, engagement in continental and colonial wars led to heavier existing taxes and new taxes, including the Poll and Hearth Taxes.

== Local government ==
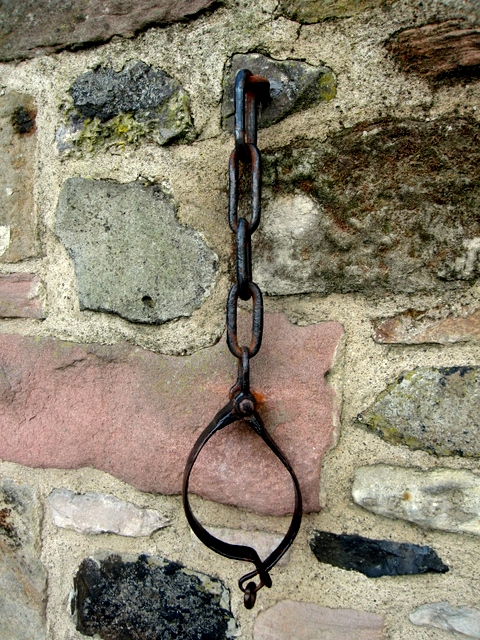
The jougs at Duddingston Parish Church, ordered to be established for beggars and other offenders from 1593

From the sixteenth century, the central government became increasingly involved in local affairs. The feud was limited and regulated, local taxation became much more intrusive and from 1607 regular, local commissions of Justices of the Peace on the English model were established to deal with petty crimes and infractions. Greater control was exerted over the lawless Borders through a joint commission with the English, set up in 1587. James VI was much more hostile to the culture and particularism of the Highlands than his predecessors. He sent colonists from Fife to parts of the region and forced the Highland chiefs to accept Lowland language and culture through the Statues of Iona of 1609. From the seventeenth century the responsibilities of shires expanded from judicial functions into wider local administration. In 1667 Commissioners of Supply were appointed in each sheriffdom or shire to collect the cess land tax.

The parish also became an important unit of local government after three major pieces of legislation, in 1574, 1579 and 1592, established what would become known as "the Old Poor Law". Pressured by Justices, the parish became responsible for taking care of the destitute in periods of famine, to prevent the impoverished from taking to the roads and causing general disorder. By the mid-seventeenth century the system had largely been rolled out across the Lowlands, but was limited in the Highlands. It was able to cope with the general level of poverty and minor crises, helping the old and infirm to survive and provide life support in periods of downturn at relatively low cost, but was overwhelmed in major subsistence crisis like that of the "seven ill years" of the 1690s. Behaviour could be regulated through kirk sessions, composed of local church elders, which replaced the church courts of the Middle Ages, and which dealt with moral and religious conduct. The local court baron remained important in regulating minor interpersonal and property offences. They were held at the behest of the local baron when there was a backlog of cases and could appoint birleymen, usually senior tenants, who would resolve disputes and issues. The combination of kirk sessions and courts baron gave considerable power to local lairds to control the behaviour of the populations of their communities.

== Law ==
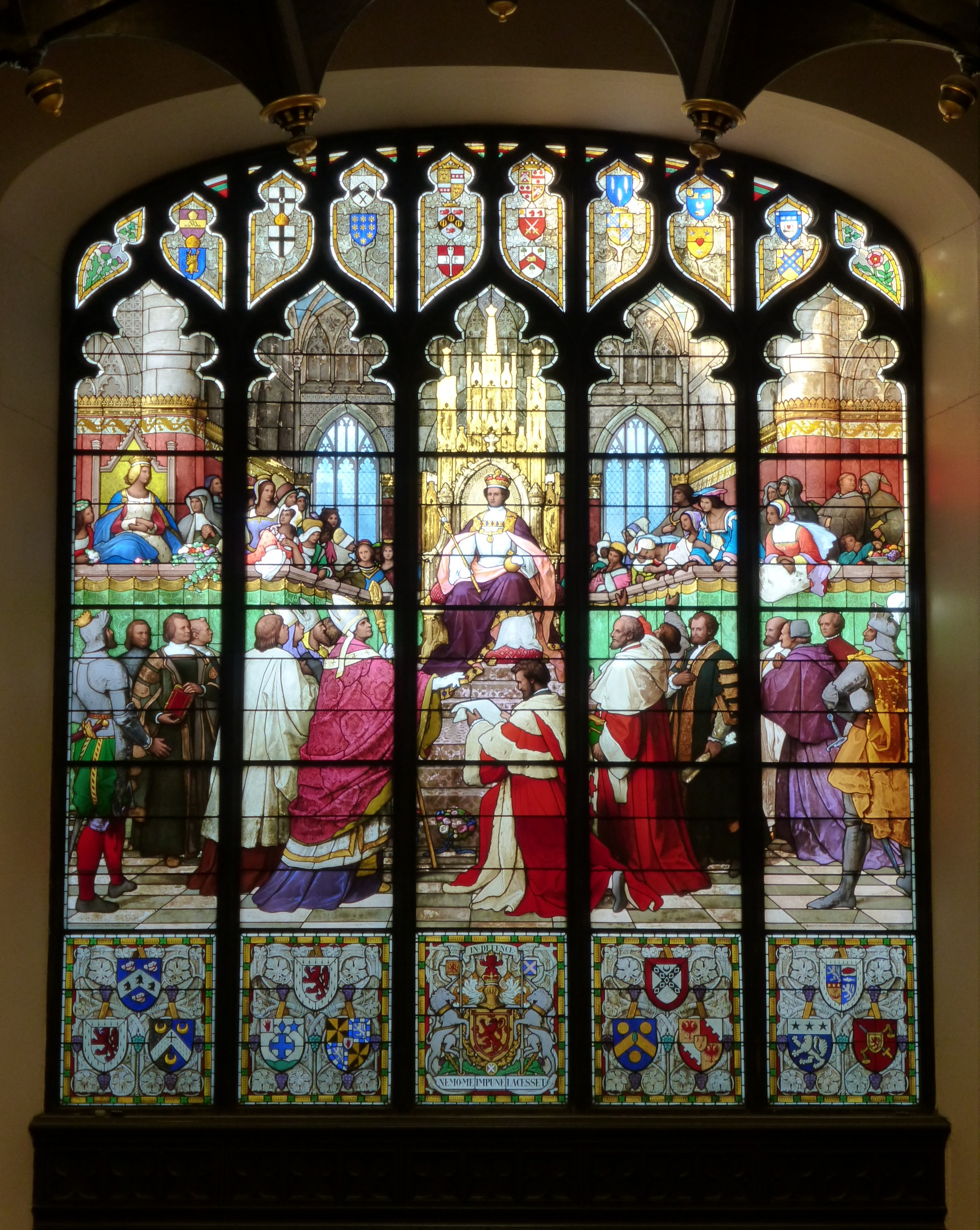
Institution of the Court of Session by James V in 1532, from the Great Window in Parliament Hall, Edinburgh

In the late Middle Ages, justice in Scotland was a mixture of the royal and local, which was often unsystematic with overlapping jurisdictions, undertaken by clerical lawyers, laymen, amateurs and local leaders. Under James IV the legal functions of the council were rationalised, with a royal Court of Session meeting daily in Edinburgh to deal with civil cases. In 1514 the office of justice-general was created for the earl of Argyll (and held by his family until 1628). The study of law was popular in Scotland from the Middle Ages and many students travelled to Continental Europe to study canon law and civil law. In 1532 the Royal College of Justice was founded, leading to the training and professionalisation of an emerging group of career lawyers. The Court of Session placed increasing emphasis on its independence from influence, including from the king, and superior jurisdiction over local justice. Its judges were increasingly able to control entry to their own ranks. In 1605 the professionalisation of the bench led to entry requirements in Latin, law and a property qualification of £2,000, designed to limit the danger of bribery, helping to create an exclusive, wealthy, powerful and professional caste, who also now dominated government posts in a way that the clergy had done in the Middle Ages. In 1672 the High Court of Justiciary was founded from the College of Justice as a supreme court of appeal. The Act of Union in 1707 largely persevered the distinct Scottish legal system and its courts, separate from English jurisdiction. The major reform to Scottish law came as a result of the Heritable Jurisdictions Act 1747, which was part of the government reaction to the Jacobite rising of 1745 and which limited the powers of burgh courts, abolished hereditary offices and made the barony and regality courts obsolete, strengthening the reach of the central judicial courts.

This period also saw widespread attempts to codify and comment on the Scottish legal system. The first substantive account of Scottish law was the Practicks of Bishop John Sinclair (d. 1566), senator of the College of Justice. This was followed by James Balfour's (c. 1525–1583) Practicks, who with Sir John Skene of Curriehill (c. 1543–1617), was a major figure in the move to codification. Skene produced an edition of the Acts of Parliament and a legal dictionary, De Verborum Significatione and edited Regiam Maisestatem, a history of the Scottish law, which attributed much of its creation to David I. Thomas Craig of Riccarton (c. 1538–1608) produced two large works, Jus Feudale, which examined feudal law, and De Unione Regnorum Britanniae, which explored the possibilities of unifying the English and Scottish legal systems. Often seen as the beginning of modern Scottish legal study is James Dalrymple, 1st Viscount of Stair's (1619–1695) The Institutions of the Law of Scotland (1681).
