= Morfyw =

Welsh bishop

Morfyw (died c. 945) was bishop of Bangor from c. 904 to 944 and bishop of Meneva (modern St. David's) for about one year around 945.

He probably served between Bishops Llunwerth and Eneuris, although some sources place him before Llunwerth and at least one after Eneuris.
