= Nobis (bishop) =

Welsh bishop

Nobis or Novis (Welsh: Nyfys; fl. c. 840) is traditionally considered to have been a bishop of Meneva (modern St Davids) in the medieval Welsh kingdom of Dyfed.

The arrival of a bishop is noted by the Annals of Wales, which Phillimore's reconstruction places in AD 840. Asser counts "Archbishop Nobis" as a relative and Gerald of Wales and other sources later include him on their bishop lists for the see. However, actual Latin of the Welsh annals read:

Nobis episcopus inminiu regnavit

in the A text and

Nouus episcopatum suscepit

in the B text. Either could describe the arrival of a bishop named "Nyfys", but the Latin can also be read directly as "Our bishop reigned in Meneva" (Old Welsh: Miniu) and "A new bishop arrived". Similarly, the Latin of Asser's Life of King Alfred could be rendered "our bishop, my relative". For the year 840, the Welsh Chronicle of the Princes (Brut y Tywysogion) notes only that "The Bishop of Meneva died" but goes on to mention that "Einion, of Noble Descent, bishop of Meneva, died" in AD 871. This Bishop Einion passes unmentioned in Gerald or sources derived from him.
