= Mark Roberts (businessman) =

British businessman

Mark Roberts is a Welsh businessman notable for the purchase of approximately sixty United Kingdom titles as Lord of the manor or Marcher Lord and his legal claims to historical rights associated with them. In several cases he has attempted to profit from the claimed rights. After having some of his rights revoked by a change of law in 2005, and a ruling that Marcher Lords no longer exist in 2008, Roberts' only standing legal right is to a moiety of wreck off the coast of some areas of Wales.

== Biography ==
In 2001 Mark Roberts claimed as the Lord of Alstonefield, a title won for £10,000 at auction, to own mineral extraction, hunting and fishing and access rights in the Staffordshire village of Alstonefield. He sought charges of up to £45,000 from residents of Peterstone for access across pathways and verges claimed through the title of Lord Marcher of Trelleck. However, his activities have been curtailed by a change in the law in 2005 meaning that no-one can be charged for access across common land if it can be shown that they have already done so for twenty years. In addition to the above, Mark Roberts also claimed that when he purchased the Lord of Alstonefield title along with several others (for £10,000 each), that the vendors, Harpur Crewe Estate, had in accidentally also sold him several entire properties, some of which had already been purchased from the former Harpur Crewe Estate. This delayed the registration of these properties for several years before a court ruling eventually ruled against Roberts.

Claims to extensive sections of foreshore under the title of Lord Marcher of St. David's delayed the planning process for a marina in the town of Fishguard. In 2008 his claim to be Lord Marcher of St Davids was rejected in a High Court action, along with his claims to have certain 'franchise' rights in that capacity. The judge ruled that Roberts only had moiety of wrecks along stretches of the Pembrokeshire Coastline, as Lord of the manor of the City of St David's. He faced estimated costs of over £600,000. In 2008 he lost another legal case, claiming rights over parts of the Severn estuary under the title of Lord Marcher of Magor. In 2015, Roberts attempted to auction leasehold rights to 25 acres of land in Spittal, Pembrokeshire.
