= John Morgan (bishop of St Davids) =

English priest (died 1504)

John Morgan (died 15 May 1504) was a medieval priest in England and Wales.

Morgan was educated at the University of Oxford, graduating LL.D. He was Dean of Windsor from 1484 to 1496; and Bishop of St Davids from 1496 until his death in 1504.
