= Elfodd =

Welsh bishop

Elfodd, Elvodug or Elfoddw (Latin: Elbodus or Elbodius; died 809) was a Welsh bishop. He is credited with inducing the Welsh church to accept the Roman computus for determining the date of Easter endorsed elsewhere in Britain at the Synod of Whitby in 664. This was after centuries of continuing the practice.

Elfodd appears to have been associated with the monastery at Holyhead on Anglesey as a young man and must have still been comparatively young when in 768 he persuaded the Welsh church to come into line with Rome as regards the method of calculating the date of Easter. The annals Brut y Tywysogion state: "Eight years after that [768] Easter was moved for the Britons, and Elbodius the servant of God moved it".

Elfodd's death is recorded under the year 809. Brut y Tywysogion describes him as "archbishop of Gwynedd". Nennius, who says in the History of the Britons that he was a pupil of Elfodd's, describes him as a "most holy bishop" and reveals that Elfodd studied the works of Bede. One later source states that he was consecrated as a bishop in 755, but may not be reliable.

== See also ==
- Easter controversy
- Celtic Christianity
