= Rhygyfarch =

Welsh writer and bishop

Rhygyfarch or Rhigyfarch (in contemporary late Old Welsh orthography Ricemarch, 1057–1099), eldest son of Sulien, whom he may have succeeded in 1091 as Bishop of St David's, was the author of the earliest surviving and standard Life of Saint David. The original text was written in Latin but was translated into Welsh later in the Middle Ages as Buchedd Dewi. The translation did much to enhance the cult status of Saint David in Wales and was in itself an important landmark in Medieval Welsh literature. He also wrote Latin poems, including one dealing with the different versions of the Psalter, and another called "Planctus Ricemarch" (Rhygyfarch's Lament), bemoaning the state of those parts of south Wales under Norman occupation.
