= Thomas Wallensis =

Welsh bishop (died 1255)

Thomas Wallensis (died 1255) was a Welsh Franciscan, archdeacon of Lincoln and then bishop of St. David's.

== Life ==
Thomas was a canon of Lincoln Cathedral in 1235, when he witnessed a charter of Robert Grosseteste's. He was one of Grosseteste's group of translators, with a knowledge of Greek. He entered the Order of Friars Minor after their arrival in the country about 1237 and became one of the first four Franciscans to teach at the University of Oxford. While he was regent master in theology at the University of Paris in 1238, Grosseteste offered him the archdeaconry of Lincoln with a prebend.

In 1243 Thomas took an active part in the dispute which arose between Grosseteste and the abbot of Bardney. Matthew Paris ascribes the origin of the suit against the abbot to the archdeacon. He was elected to the impoverished bishopric of St. David's on 16 July 1247, accepted it at Grosseteste's urging. He was consecrated on 26 July 1248 at Canterbury. He was present at the parliament in London, Easter 1253, and joined in excommunicating violators of Magna Carta. He died on 11 July 1255.

== Notes ==
Attribution

This article incorporates text from a publication now in the public domain: Lee, Sidney, ed. (1899). "Wallensis, Thomas (d.1255)". Dictionary of National Biography. Vol. 59. London: Smith, Elder & Co.
