= New Monarchs =

Early modern monarchs that tried to centralize power in the crown

The New Monarchs is a concept developed by European historians during the first half of the 20th century to characterize 15th-century European rulers who unified their respective nations, creating stable and centralized governments. This centralization allowed for an era of worldwide colonization and conquest in the 16th century, and paved the way for rapid economic growth in Europe. Many historians argue the Military Revolution made possible, and indeed made necessary, formation of strong central governments in order to maximize military strength that could enable conquest and prevent being conquered.

== Examples ==
The best examples of New Monarchs are, chronologically:

- John I of Portugal — terminated the political anarchy and began the Portuguese period of discoveries
- John II of Portugal crushed the power of the Nobility, establishing the preeminence of the Crown
- Charles VII of France — ended civil disputes
- Louis XI of France — united France as it recovered from the Hundred Years War
- Isabella I of Castile and Ferdinand II of Aragon — They never combined their territory. Each always ruled their own lands independently, weakened the power of the nobility, completed the Reconquista, reformed the state finances, the law, the church, and the army and began the age of Spanish exploration. They also outlawed all religions except Catholicism.
- Henry VII of England — ended the War of the Roses and pacified Yorkist resistance by marrying Elizabeth of York

== Achievements ==
The achievements of the New Monarchs:

- Limiting the power of the feudal aristocracy
- Creating efficient, centralized systems of taxation
- Maintaining a standing army loyal to the monarch
- Encouraging some sense of national identity (but by no means nationalism yet)
- Fostering trade, both internally and externally
- Enforcing religious unity within their countries

While Peter the Great ruled two centuries after the New Monarchs, he is sometimes considered the New Monarch of Russia, accomplishing for his country very much what the New Monarchs did for theirs.

After the New Monarchs, the Absolutist Monarchs gained sway, to be followed by the Enlightened Absolutism.

== History ==
New Monarchies, which were very powerful centralized governments with unified inhabitants, began to emerge in the mid-15th century. Factors responsible for this advance were the vast demographic and economic growth. Before these New Monarchies were formed, there were many changes the new monarchs had to make: including weakening powerful rivals, increasing revenue, unifying the country, and strengthening the power of the king and his bureaucracy. Two countries successful in strengthening themselves were France and England. England was headed by Henry VII and his son Henry VIII of the Tudor dynasty; France was headed by Louis XI, Louis XII and Francis I of the Valois dynasty.

=== Actions taken ===
The rulers of England and France both had to weaken their rivals, the church and nobility, in order to centralise power to the crown. In England, Henry VII came to power by decisively winning the Wars of the Roses, fought between his mother's family, the House of Lancaster, and their rivals, the House of York. The Lancastrian and Tudor forces defeated the powerful House of York, led by Henry Tudor (later Henry VII), whose descent from the House of Lancaster gave him legitimacy among the Lancastrian army. Henry then ascended to the throne after the Battle of Bosworth Field, and unified the two warring houses in his marriage to Elizabeth of York, thereby weakening the potential for opposition from the strongest noble families on both sides of the conflict, and making it much easier to centralise power away from the nobility.

Moreover, so many nobles had died during the Wars of the Roses that Henry VII came to the throne with a total of 73 peers in England, and a further 16 in Ireland, so there was a lack of power among the wider nobility to challenge his rule even if they had wanted to. Henry VII hired the gentry, the class below nobility, to serve as Justices of Peace, who enforce the king's law and collect taxes; this weakened the power of nobility and made sure the king's laws were followed. He also increased the power of his royal court, the Star Chamber, giving them cases that previously went to nobility: thus increasing his own power over the judicial system.

France had more difficulty in weakening its nobles and centralising power. Before the mid-1400s the aristocrats were very powerful, serving as independent rulers with their own laws and courts. Frances I sold offices in government, many of which come with a title. This increased the number of men in the class of nobles enabling Frances to dilute the aristocracy with men loyal to him.

These two countries had very separate methods of dealing with the problem of the church and its power. Henry VIII, under the advice of Thomas Cromwell, decided to break off from the Catholic church and start his own religion, the Anglican church. Francis I, on the other hand, decided on a more simplistic approach and forces the pope to sign the Concordat of Bologna in 1516, which gave the king power to appoint whomever he wants for bishops and other religious positions and lessened the power of the papacy.

Both kings needed to increase revenue. France needed more capital than England because of its permanent army of 15,000 soldiers, which cost half of the king's revenue. Both countries improved tax collection by preventing people from evading taxes. Henry VII concocted numerous schemes to increase his revenue. Since he needed Parliament's consent to could increase taxes, he increased fines for criminals. This had the dual effect of decreasing crime and increasing his treasury. Furthermore, he sold monopolies, which fetched large sums because those in possession could sell their products at any price, without fear of competition. France had a slightly different way of doing things; Frances I sold positions of government, and centralized tax collection under one agency. With one agency heading the collection, fewer people were able to evade taxes. France also instituted new taxes.

=== Results ===
Though stabilizing New Monarchies was not easy, it proved to be very worthwhile. After Henry VIII and Francis I, wars began for England and France, England's northern rising and France's civil war. Both countries are able to pull through because of the strength invested during the New Monarchies. Additionally the strength formed during England's New Monarchies helped withstand the fragile reigns of Edward and Mary, who followed after Henry VIII.

== See also ==
- Visconti of Milan
