= Iorwerth (bishop of St Davids) =

Welsh bishop

Iorwerth, O.Praem., was formerly abbot of the house of Premonstratensian canons regular at Talyllychan in Wales. He was elected to the vacant Diocese of St Davids in 1215.

== Sources ==
- Lloyd, J.E. 1939. A History of Wales, ii, 603
