= Llunwerth II =

Welsh bishop

Llunwerth or Llwmbert (fl. c. AD 873) was a bishop of Meneva (modern St. David's) in medieval Wales.

The Annals of Wales and Plumber name him as the direct successor to Bishop Nobis, while the diocese itself places him at a remove of eight successors. He is recorded in the Book of Llandaf as a contemporary of Tewdwr ab Elisedd, king of Brycheiniog.

The Annals of Wales record him serving for an improbable 65 years.

He is sometimes known as Llunwerth II to distinguish him from an earlier bishop of the same name.
