= Sulien =

11th-century Welsh bishop

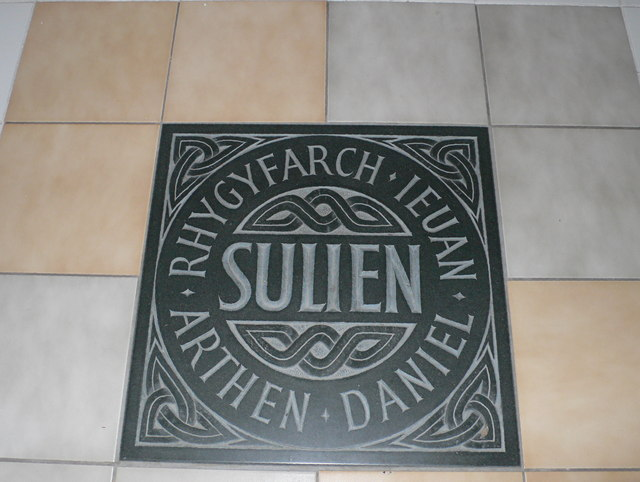
Plaque for Sulien, Llanbadarn Fawr

Sulien was an 11th-century Bishop of St David's, for two periods (1073–1078 and 1079/80–1085/6). He died about 1090/1.

Sulien is closely associated with the clas church at Llanbadarn Fawr near Aberystwyth where it appears that he took refuge when St David's was at times exposed to Viking incursions. Llanbadarn enjoyed a reputation for scholarship. One of his sons, Rhigyfarch was the author of a 'Life of Saint David'.
