= Brut y Tywysogion =

Welsh historical chronicle

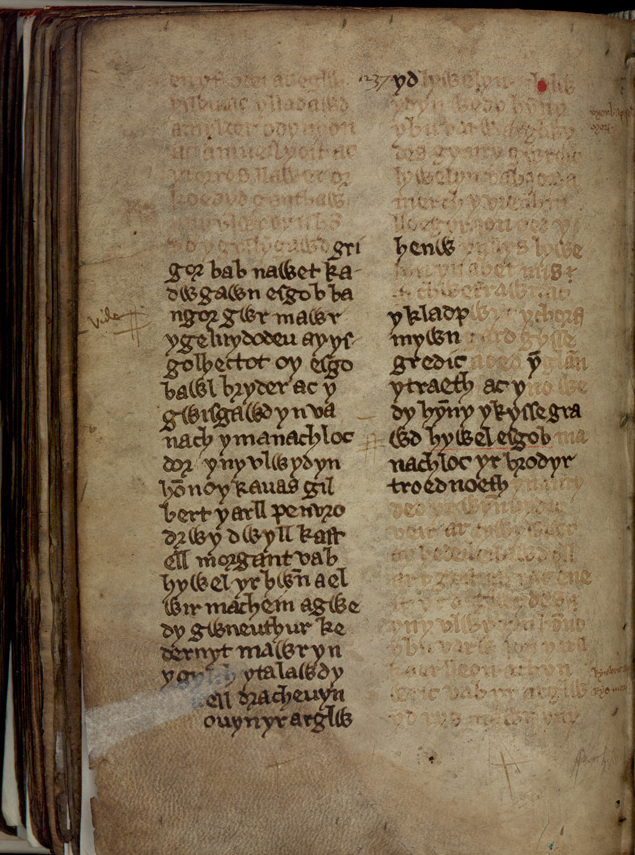
Peniarth Ms. 20, folio 260v. (c.1330). This manuscript is the earliest copy of Brut y Tywysogion, a Welsh translation of a lost Latin work, the Cronica Principium Wallie

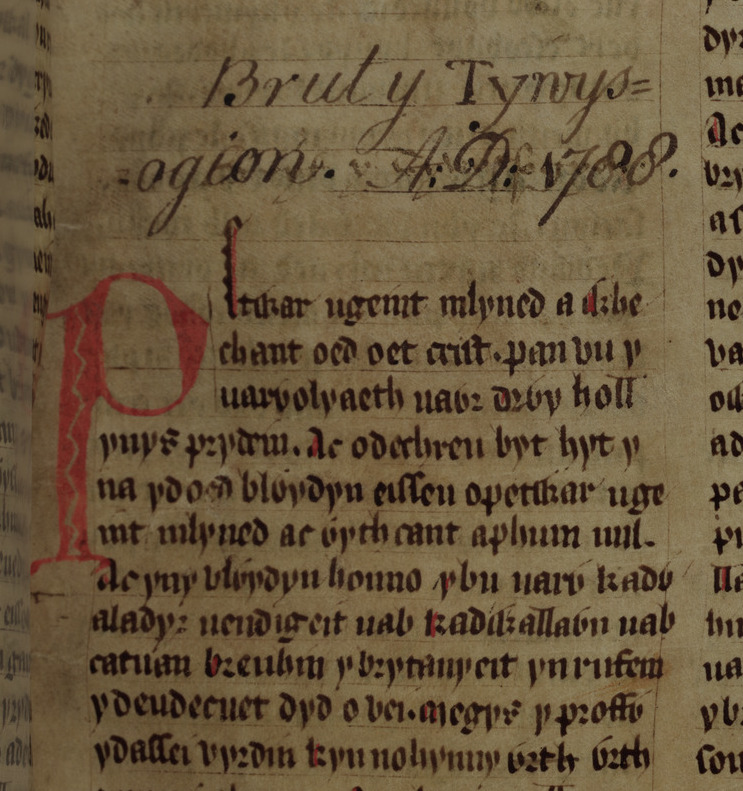
The opening lines of Brut y Tywysogion from the Red Book of Hergest

Brut y Tywysogion (English: Chronicle of the Princes) is one of the most important primary sources for Welsh history. It is an annalistic chronicle that serves as a continuation of Geoffrey of Monmouth’s Historia Regum Britanniae. Brut y Tywysogion has survived as several Welsh translations of an original Latin version, which has not itself survived. The most important versions are the one in Robert Vaughan's Peniarth MS. 20 and the slightly less complete one in the Red Book of Hergest. The version entitled Brenhinoedd y Saeson (Kings of the English) combines material from the Welsh annals with material from an English source.

The Peniarth MS. 20 version begins in 682 with a record of the death of Cadwaladr and ends in 1332. The entries for the earlier years are brief, usually records of deaths and events such as eclipses, plagues or earthquakes, but later entries are much more detailed. The main focus is on the rulers of the kingdoms of Gwynedd, Powys and Deheubarth, but ecclesiastical events are also mentioned, such as the bringing of the date of celebrating Easter in the Welsh church into line with Rome by "Elbodius" (Elfodd), Bishop of Bangor, in 768. Events in England, Ireland, Scotland, Brittany and sometimes France are also briefly chronicled.

The original monastic annals are thought to have been written at Strata Florida Abbey, but may have been kept at the old abbey at Llanbadarn Fawr in the 11th century. Annals from other abbeys were also used in the composition. At least one of the Welsh translations is also thought to have been written at Strata Florida.
