= Gregory Cameron =

British bishop

The Right Reverend Gregory Cameron CStJ
- Bishop of St Asaph
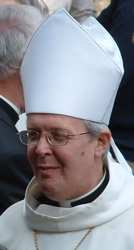
- Cameron at his consecration in 2009
- Church: Church in Wales
- Diocese: St Asaph
- Elected: 5 January 2009
- Installed: 25 April 2009

Orders
- Ordination: 1983 (deacon); 1984 (priest)
- Consecration: 4 April 2009 by Barry Morgan

Personal details
- Born: Gregory Kenneth Cameron; 6 June 1959 (age 67) Wales
- Spouse: Clare
- Children: Three
- Education: Lincoln College, Oxford; Downing College, Cambridge

Gregory Kenneth Cameron CStJ (born 6 June 1959) is a Welsh Anglican bishop. He is Bishop of the Diocese of St Asaph in Wales, having been elected on 5 January 2009 and confirmed as bishop on 16 March 2009.

== Life and career ==
Cameron was born in south-east Wales in 1959 and grew up in Llangybi, Monmouthshire. He was educated at Croesyceiliog School in Cwmbran and Lincoln College, Oxford, where he studied law. He was then accepted for ordination by the Church in Wales and studied theology at Downing College, Cambridge, where his tutors included Rowan Williams, and at St. Michael's College, Llandaff. He was made deacon at Michaelmas 1983 (24 September) and ordained priest the following Michaelmas (29 September 1984) — both times by Derrick Childs, Bishop of Monmouth and Archbishop of Wales.

He served as a parish priest in Newport and Llanmartin, later becoming Chaplain at Wycliffe College in Gloucestershire. In 2000, he was appointed Chaplain to the Archbishop of Wales, Rowan Williams.

Cameron was appointed as Director of Ecumenical Affairs by the Secretary General of the Anglican Communion in 2003, becoming Deputy Secretary General in 2004. He was secretary to the Lambeth Commission that wrote the Windsor Report. In this role, he was described by The Times as "the top canon lawyer who helps run the headquarters of the worldwide Anglican Communion", and it was also said of him that "although his name is not widely known outside the church, he is arguably the most influential clergyman behind the scenes within it". His work for reconciliation in the Anglican Communion led to the award of an honorary Doctorate of Divinity by the Episcopal Divinity School, Massachusetts. He is also an Honorary Research Fellow in Canon Law at Cardiff University. He was awarded the Cross of St Augustine by the Archbishop of Canterbury on 27 March 2009.

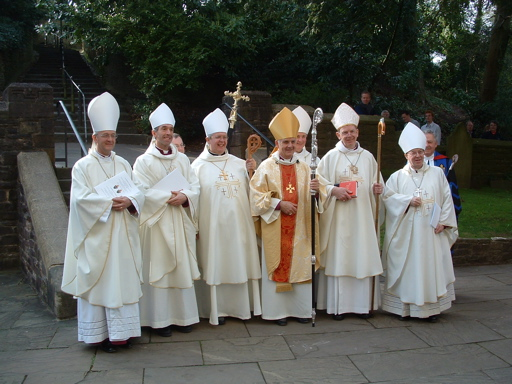
The bishops of the Church in Wales at Gregory Cameron's consecration

On 5 January 2009, he was elected as the 76th Bishop of St Asaph in succession to John Davies, who retired in 2008. He was consecrated on 4 April 2009 in Llandaff Cathedral by Barry Morgan, Archbishop of Wales, assisted by the other four Welsh diocesan bishops, together with the Archbishops of Canterbury and Armagh, the Primus of the Scottish Episcopal Church and 24 other co-consecrators. On 25 April 2009 he was enthroned in his cathedral at St Asaph.

In 2015, he succeeded Geoffrey Rowell as Anglican Co-Chair of the Anglican–Oriental Orthodox International Commission. In 2019, he was appointed as an Officer of the Most Venerable Order of St John of Jerusalem (OStJ), and promoted to Commander (CStJ) in January 2022.

In December 2021, Cameron received the Religious Leader award from the Ozanne Foundation for his work to allow same-sex blessings within the Church of Wales.

== Heraldry, numismatics and publications ==
Cameron has longstanding interests in heraldry and in coin collecting. In 2016, a design by him was selected by the Royal Mint for the last round one pound coin; and in the same year he was commissioned to design the first Christmas twenty pound coin. Both coins are commemorative issues, and not intended for general circulation. In February 2017 his design of the royal arms for the Sapphire Jubilee of Queen Elizabeth II appeared on one of the commemorative coins for that event issued by the Royal Mint. Subsequently, he has worked with the London Mint Office in the creation of designs for sovereign gold coins issued by Gibraltar and the Falkland Islands.

In 2021, Canterbury Press in the UK, and Paraclete Press in the US, published his book An Advent Book of Days, and in 2022, An Easter Book of Days. In 2024, Canterbury Press published his third book, A Prayer Book of Days. All three books feature text and illustrations by the author.

== Personal life ==
Cameron is married to Clare and has three sons.

Church in Wales titles
Preceded by John Davies	Bishop of St Asaph; 2009–present	Incumbent
