= Dewi Bridges =

British bishop (1933–2015)

The Right Reverend Dewi Bridges
- Bishop of Swansea and Brecon
- Church: Church in Wales
- Diocese: Diocese of Swansea and Brecon
- Elected: 1988
- In office: 1988–1998
- Predecessor: Benjamin Noel Young Vaughan
- Successor: Anthony Edward Pierce
- Other post: Archdeacon of St Davids (1982–1988)

Orders
- Ordination: 1957 (deacon); 1958 (priest)
- Consecration: 1988 by George Noakes

Personal details
- Born: November 18, 1933 Beaufort, Brecknockshire, Wales
- Died: 18 May 2015 (aged 81)
- Denomination: Anglican
- Education: St David's College, Lampeter, Corpus Christi College, Cambridge, Westcott House, Cambridge

Dewi Morris Bridges (18 November 1933 – 18 May 2015) was a Welsh Anglican bishop. He was the Bishop of Swansea and Brecon from 1988 until 1998.

Bridges was born in Beaufort in Brecknockshire on 18 November 1933. He was educated at the St David's College, Lampeter and Corpus Christi College, Cambridge, and was ordained after a period of study at Westcott House, Cambridge in 1957.

== Career ==
He held curacies at Rhymney and Chepstow (1960–63) after which he was Vicar of St James’, Tredegar. From 1965 to 1969 he was a Lecturer at Summerfield College of Education, Kidderminster, and then Vicar of Kempsey. Later he was Rural Dean of Narberth and then Archdeacon of St David's, before his elevation to the episcopate in 1988. He retired effective 30 November 1998.

== Death ==
He died on 18 May 2015. His funeral was held on 29 May 2015, at St Mary's Church, Tenby, Wales.

Church in Wales titles
| Preceded by Benjamin Noel Young Vaughan | Bishop of Swansea and Brecon; 1988–1998 | Succeeded by Anthony Edward Pierce |
