= David Williams (archdeacon of St Davids) =

British Anglican priest

David Edward Williams (1847–1920) was the Archdeacon of St Davids from 1900 until 1920.

Williams matriculated at Exeter College, Oxford in 1867, aged 19; he graduated B.A. and M.A. in 1874. He was ordained in 1877. After curacies in Carmarthen and Pembroke, he held incumbencies in Llanfrynach, Llawhaden and Llangyfelach.

Church in Wales titles
Preceded by Charles Edmondes	Archdeacon of St Davids; 1900–1920	Succeeded by David Prosser
