= Jack Thomas (bishop) =

British bishop (1908–1995)

The Right Reverend Jack Thomas
- Bishop of Swansea and Brecon
- Church: Church in Wales
- Diocese: Diocese of Swansea and Brecon
- In office: 1958 to 1976
- Predecessor: Glyn Simon
- Successor: Benjamin Vaughan

Personal details
- Born: John James Absalom Thomas; 17 May 1908
- Died: 27 February 1995 (aged 86)
- Denomination: Anglicanism

John James Absalom Thomas (17 May 1908 – 27 February 1995) was the Bishop of Swansea and Brecon from 1958 until 1976.

Thomas was educated at the University of Aberystwyth and Keble College, Oxford, and was ordained in 1932. He held curacies at Llancaiach and Sketty after which he was the Bishop's Messenger and Examining Chaplain for the Swansea diocese. He was then Warden of Church Hostel, Bangor, and a lecturer at the University College of North Wales until 1944. Following this he was Vicar of Swansea and then Archdeacon of Gower - before being enthroned as Bishop of Swansea and Brecon on 2 February 1958. He made his son, David, (who served as Provincial Assistant Bishop in the Church in Wales from 1996 to 2008) a deacon on 21 May 1967 at St Asaph Cathedral; Jack retired in 1976.

Church in Wales titles
Preceded by Glyn Simon	Bishop of Swansea and Brecon; 1958–1976	Succeeded by Benjamin Vaughan
