= Archdeacon of St Asaph =

This is a list of the archdeacons of St Asaph. The Archdeacon of St Asaph is the priest in charge of the archdeaconry of St Asaph, an administrative division of the Church in Wales Diocese of St Asaph. The archdeaconry comprises the five rural deaneries of Denbigh, Dyffryn Clwyd, Holywell, Llanrwst/Rhos and St Asaph.

== Archdeacons of St Asaph ==
- 1170: David
- 1205–1210: Adam
- 1231–1240: David
- 1250:Anian I
- 1266: David
- 1268-1293: Anian Schonaw (Anian II)
- 1277: Gruffudd ab Iorwerth
- 1293, 1306: Gruffudd
- ?–1330: Llywellyn ap Hwfa
- 1331: Llywellyn ap Madog ab Elis
- 1382–1383: Thomas Rushook (afterwards Bishop of Llandaff, 1383)
- 1390: Thomas Keler
- 1398: Griffith le Yonge
- ?–1402: Ithel ap Robert
- 1425: Edward Trefor
- 1442–?1457: John Tupney
- <1508–1532: Peter Conway
- 1535: Richard Shelton
- 1537: William ap Roberts
- 1539–1554: Richard Pollard
- 1539–1554: Thomas Davies (dismissed)
- 1554–1558: Humfrey Edwards
- 1558–1561: Thomas Davies (restored; afterwards Bishop of St Asaph, 1561)
- 1562–1566: Richard Rogers (later Bishop of Dover, 1569)
- 1566–1573: Thomas Powell
- 1573–1844: Post held in commendam by Bishops of St Asaph
- 1844–1854: Charles Butler Clough (afterwards Dean of St Asaph)
- 1854–1877: Robert Wickham
- 1877-1878: Hugh Morgan
- 1878-1889: Edward Smart
- 1889–1892: Watkin Williams (afterwards Dean of St Asaph, 1892)
- 1892–1897: Hugh Jones
- 1897–1910: David Evans
- 1910–1935: Thomas Lloyd (also Bishop of Maenan, 1928)
- 1935–1942: Charles Roberts
- 1942–1959: Richard Roberts
- 1959–1964: John Edwards
- 1964–1970: Richard Owen
- 1970–1974: William Rees
- 1974–1984: John Jones
- 1984–1990: Selwyn Closs-Parry
- 1991–1999: John Davies (afterwards Bishop of St Asaph, 1999)
- 2000–2011: Bernard Thomas
- 2011–2014 (ret.): Chris Potter
- 1 December 2014 – 2018 John Lomas
- 7 October 2018 – present Andy Grimwood
