= Bernard Thomas =

Welsh priest

Elwyn Bernard Thomas was an Archdeacon of St Asaph in the Church in Wales's Diocese of St Asaph.

He was born in 1945, educated at Swansea University and St Michael's College, Llandaff, and ordained in 1972. After curacies at Aberdare and Merthyr Dyfan, he held incumbencies in Dowlais, Llangynwyd with Maesteg. From 2000 until his August 2011 retirement, he was Rector of Llandyrnog and Archdeacon of the surrounding area (St Asaph) and a trustee of the St Asaph Diocesan Board of Finance.

== Notes ==
Church of England titles
Preceded by John Davies	Archdeacon of St Asaph; 2000–2011	Succeeded by Chris Potter
