= Edward Owen (priest) =

Edward Owen was the Archdeacon of St Davids from 1831 until 1833.

Owen was educated at Jesus College, Oxford. He was Chaplain to Robert Jenkinson, 2nd Earl of Liverpool then Curate at Reculver. In 1819 he became Vicar of Chislet.

He died on 21 May 1833.

Church in Wales titles
Preceded by Ralph Churton	Archdeacon of St Davids; 1831–1833	Succeeded by Thomas Bevan
