= Selwyn Closs-Parry =

Archdeacon of St Asaph

Selwyn Closs-Parry (1925 – 13 October 2015) was Archdeacon of St Asaph from 1984 to 1990.

He was born in 1925 and educated at St David's College, Lampeter, and ordained after a period of study at St. Michael's College, Llandaff, in 1953.

He began his career as Curate of St Gwynan's, Dwygyfylchi. He held incumbencies at Treuddyn and Llangystennin and Holywell. He was a Canon at St Asaph Cathedral from 1976 and later Archdeacon of the surrounding area. He died on 13 October 2015.

== Notes ==
Church in Wales titles
Preceded by John Jones	Archdeacon of St Asaph; 1984–1990	Succeeded by John Davies
