= Anthony Pierce =

Church of Wales bishop

- Bishop of Swansea and Brecon
- Church: Church in Wales
- Diocese: Diocese of Swansea and Brecon
- Elected: 1999
- Installed: 1999
- Term ended: 16 January 2008
- Predecessor: Dewi Bridges
- Successor: John Davies
- Previous post: Archdeacon of Gower (1995–1999)

Orders
- Ordination: 1965 (deacon); 1966 (priest)
- Consecration: 1999 by Rowan Williams

Personal details
- Born: 16 January 1941 (age 85) Swansea, Glamorgan, Wales
- Denomination: Anglican
- Education: Dynevor School, Swansea; Swansea University; Linacre College, Oxford; Ripon College Cuddesdon

Anthony Edward Pierce (born 16 January 1941) is a Welsh former Anglican bishop and convicted sex offender. He served as the Bishop of Swansea and Brecon in the Church in Wales from 1999 to 2008. In 2025, he was convicted of five counts of indecent assault on a teenage boy and was sentenced to 4 years and 1 month in prison.

== Early life and education ==
Pierce was born on 16 January 1941, in Swansea, Glamorgan He was educated at Dynevor School, Swansea. He studied at Swansea University and Linacre College, Oxford. He trained for ordination at Ripon College Cuddesdon.

== Career ==
He was ordained in 1966. In Swansea he held curacies at St Peter's Church (1965–1967) and at St Mary's Church (1967–1974), before being appointed vicar of Llwynderw in 1974 - a position he held until 1992. He was then chaplain of Singleton Hospital (1980-1995), Secretary of the Diocesan Conference (1991-1995) and Diocesan Director of Education (1992-1999).

Pierce served as Archdeacon of Gower from 1995 to 1999 and Rector of St Mary's Church a from 1996 to 1999 when he became Bishop of Swansea and Brecon. He legally became Bishop when his election was confirmed by the Sacred Synod of the Church in Wales at their April 1999 meeting; he was later ordained to the episcopate (consecrated) and enthroned at Brecon Cathedral. He retired in 2008.

In 2002 he was admitted to the Order of St John, being later elevated to KStJ. He is no longer a member.

On 10 December 2016, celebrations for the 50th anniversary of Anthony's ordination as a priest took place at St Mary's Church where he had served as curate, and then rector of St Mary's Church before he was ordained to the episcopate.

== Sexual abuse ==
In October 2023, Pierce was arrested after allegations of abuse were made against him by a victim who had been a teenager at the time of the abuse. In February 2025, he pleaded guilty to five counts of indecent assault on a boy under the age of 16; they occurred between 1985 and 1990 when he was a parish priest in the West Cross area of Swansea. In March 2025, he was jailed for 4 years and 1 month, and will be on the sex-offenders register for life. Following his conviction, the Church in Wales began disciplinary action against Pierce, with John Lomas, the present Bishop of Swansea and Brecon, saying he will ask the Disciplinary Tribunal to depose him from Holy Orders.

A separate allegation of sexual abuse by Pierce had been reported to senior figures in the church in 1993. Police, however, were only informed of that allegation in 2010, by which time the alleged victim had died. In the mean time, he was promoted to archdeacon in 1995 and elected a bishop in 1999. In relation to this allegation during a historic cases review between 2009 and 2010, the Church of Wales removed his permission to officiate but this was restored in 2011. Then in 2016, his permission to officiate was once more removed.

St John's Ambulance confirmed that Pirece was now no longer a member of the Order of St John. He was deposed from Holy Orders and is no longer a priest.

Church in Wales titles
Preceded by Dewi Bridges	Bishop of Swansea and Brecon; 1999–2008	Succeeded by John Davies
