= William Rees (archdeacon of St Asaph) =

British priest

William Hugh Rees was Archdeacon of St Asaph in Wales from 1970 to 1974.

He was born in 1905 and educated at St David's College, Lampeter, and Westcott House, Cambridge. He was ordained in 1929 and began his career with curacies at Carmarthen and Uzmaston. After this, he was Bishop's Messenger for the Diocese of St Davids from 1935 to 1939. He held incumbencies at St Mary Haverfordwest and St Paul, Colwyn Bay. He was Rural Dean of Rhos from 1960 to 1970, when he became Archdeacon of the surrounding area. He retired in 1974.

== Notes ==
Church in Wales titles
Preceded by Richard Henry Owen	Archdeacon of St Asaph; 1970–1974	Succeeded by John Jenkin Jones
