= Archdeacon of St Davids =

Position in the Church of Wales

The archdeacon of St Davids is a senior cleric in the Church in Wales' Diocese of St Davids. The archdeacon is the senior priest with responsibility over the area of the archdeaconry of St Davids, one of three archdeaconries in the diocese (the others are Cardigan and Carmarthen). The archdeaconry of St Davids comprises the four rural deaneries of Daugleddau, Dewisland/Fishguard, Pembroke and Roose.

The first recorded archdeacons of St Davids occur soon after the Norman Conquest. However, no territorial titles are recorded until after c. 1125.

== List of archdeacons of St Davids ==
- 1175–1214 Pontius
- 1215–1222 Martin
- 1219–1229 Hugh of Clun
- 1231–? Jordan of the Three Mountains
- 1248–1259 Richard de Knovill
- 1276–1280 Peter Quinel (afterwards Bishop of Exeter, 1280)
- 1280–1287 Robert de Haverford
- 1293–1307 John Foke
- 1319 Philip
- 1328 Henry de Gower (afterwards Bishop of St Davids, 1328)
- 1328–1334 David Franceys
- ?–1349 John Faulkes
- 1349–? Richard Cleangre
- 1363,1383 John Goch or Gough
- 1361–1368 Adam de Bokelyn or Rokelyn
- 1388–1400 John Bouland
- 1400–1419 John Hiot
- 1420 John Thomas
- 1420–1422 Edmund Nicholls
- 1422–1424 William Ryley
- ?–1434 William Pencrych
- 1434–? William Thame
- 1458 John Smith
- 1459 Richard Caunton
- 1473-?1476 John Smith (2nd term; afterwards Bishop of Llandaff, 1476)
- 1500–1514 Thomas Saynte
- ?–1527 John Fychan
- ?–1547 Andrew Whitmay (Bishop of Chrysopolis)
- 1557–1581 Richard Harford
- ?–1581 John Pratt
- 1607–1644 Robert Rudd (ejected and imprisoned, 1644)
- 1644–1667 Hugh Lloyd (also Bishop of Llandaff, 1660)
- 1667–? Anthony Jones
- 1678–? George Owen
- 1691–1732 John Medley
- 1732–1732 Walter Morgan
- 1732–?1737 Arthur Williams
- 1737–1749 Richard Davies
- 1749–1767 Thomas Burton
- 1767–1805 Charles Moss
- 1805–1831 Ralph Churton
- 1831–1833 Edward Owen
- 1833–1863 Thomas Bevan
- 1864–1874 George Clark
- 1874–1883 Richard Lewis (afterwards Bishop of Llandaff, 1883)
- 1883–1888 Charles Edmondes
- 1888–1900 George Christopher Hilbers (resigned)
- 1900–1920 David Williams
- 1920–1927 David Prosser (afterwards Bishop of St Davids, 1927)
- 1927–1928 Gilbert Joyce (afterwards Bishop of Monmouth, 1928)
- 1929–1936 Edward Lincoln Lewis
- 1937–1942 Richard Rice Thomas (died 1942)
- 1942–1949 Bickerton Edwards
- 1949–1962 Christopher Gwynne Lewis
- 1963–1967 David Herbert Lloyd (died 1967)
- 1968–1969 Ronald James Tree
- 1970–1982 Benjamin Alec Lewis
- 1982–1988 Dewi Bridges (afterwards Bishop of Swansea and Brecon, 1988)
- 1988–1991 Ivor Rees, Assistant Bishop of St Davids (afterwards Bishop of St Davids, 1991)
- 1991–1996 Cyril John Harvey
- 1997–2002 Graham Davies
- 2003–2010 John Holdsworth (afterwards Archdeacon in Cyprus, 2010)
- 2010–2013 Keith Smalldon
- 2013–2018 Dennis Wight
- 2018 – 2026 Paul Mackness (Currently Dean of St Davids)
- 2026 - present Leigh Richardson
