= Bishop Lloyd =

Bishop Lloyd may refer to:

- Hugh Lloyd (bishop) (circa 1586–1667), Welsh cleric who was the Anglican bishop of Llandaff
- Humphrey Lloyd (bishop) (1610–1689), Bishop of Bangor in England
- William Lloyd (Bishop of Worcester) (1627–1717), bishop of St Asaph, Lichfield and Coventry, then Worcester in England; he supervised the addition of Ussher's (revised) chronology to the 1701 edition of the Bible.
- William Lloyd (Bishop of Norwich) (1637–1710), bishop of Llandaff in Wales, then Peterborough and Norwich in England
- John Lloyd (Bishop of St David's) (1638–1687), Vice-Chancellor of Oxford University and Bishop of St David's
- Charles Lloyd (bishop) (1784–1829), Regius Professor of Divinity and Bishop of Oxford from 1827 to 1829
- Arthur Lloyd (bishop) (1844–1907) Anglican Bishop in England
- John Lloyd (Bishop of Swansea) (1847–1915), Welsh suffragan bishop

== See also ==
- Lloyd Clifton Bishop (1890–1968), Major League Baseball pitcher
- Bishop Lloyd's House in Chester, England
