= Dennis Wight =

Dennis Marley Wight (born 1953) was the Archdeacon of St Davids from 2013 until 2018.

Wight was educated at the University of Southampton and studied for the priesthood at Sarum and Wells Theological College; and was ordained deacon in 1985, priest in 1986. After a curacy at Gillingham, Dorset, he was Vicar of Coseley from 1990 to 1994; Team Rector of Stoke Prior from 1994 to 2002 (Rural Dean of Droitwich from 1996 to 1999); and Vicar of Dale, Pembrokeshire, until 2010. He was Director of Mission, Warden of Ordinands and Bishop's Chaplain in the Diocese of St Davids from 2010 to 2014.

Church in Wales titles
Preceded by Keith Smalldon	Archdeacon of St Davids; 2013–2018	Succeeded by Paul Mackness
