= Benjamin Alec Lewis =

Welsh priest (1912–2003)

Benjamin Alec Lewis (16 November 1912 – 2003) was a Welsh Anglican priest who was Archdeacon of St Davids from 1970 to 1982.

Lewis was born in Cardiganshire, Wales and was educated at St David's College, Lampeter. He was ordained deacon in 1937, and priest in 1938. After curacies at Cardigan and Ammanford, he was Bishop's messenger to the Bishop of St David's, David Prosser. He held incumbencies in Llanelly and Hubberston.

He died in Dyfed, aged 90.
