= George Clark (priest) =

George Clark (29 June 1810 – 11 December 1874) was Archdeacon of St David's from 1867 until his death.

Clark was born in the parish of St Dunstan-in-the-West and educated at University College, Oxford. He was Vicar of Cantley in Yorkshire from 1845 to 1854; and Rector of Tenby from 1854 to 1867.

He died suddenly after contracting pneumonia.

Church in Wales titles
Preceded by Thomas Bevan	Archdeacon of St Davids; 1867–1874	Succeeded by Richard Lewis
