= John Lomas (bishop) =

Welsh Anglican bishop

The Right Reverend John Lomas
- Bishop of Swansea and Brecon
- Church: Church in Wales
- Diocese: Diocese of Swansea and Brecon
- In office: 2021–present
- Predecessor: John Davies
- Previous posts: Archdeacon of St Asaph (2014–2018); Archdeacon of Wrexham (2018–2021)

Orders
- Ordination: 1994 (deacon); 1995 (priest) by Alwyn Rice Jones
- Consecration: 26 February 2022 by Andy John

Personal details
- Born: John Derrick Percy Lomas; 19 August 1958 (age 68)
- Denomination: Anglicanism
- Education: St Michael's College, Llandaff

John Derrick Percy Lomas (born 19 August 1958) is an Anglican bishop in Wales, serving as the Bishop of Swansea and Brecon since 2021.

== Biography ==
He trained for ordination at St Michael's College, Llandaff. He was made deacon at Petertide 1994 (25 June), by Alwyn Rice Jones, Bishop of St Asaph and Archbishop of Wales, at St Asaph Cathedral. He served his curacy at Rhyl from 1994 to 2000. He was then a chaplain in the Royal Navy from 2000 to 2001. He returned to parish ministry and was vicar of Holywell, Flintshire and also the Area Dean (2001 to 2011), vicar of Corwen (2011 to 2013), and finally vicar of Bangor Monachorum (2013 to 2014). He was Archdeacon of St Asaph from 1 December 2014 to 2018, and also rector of Caerwys from 2015. He served as Archdeacon of Wrexham from October 2018 until his elevation to the episcopate.

It announced on 4 November 2021 that Lomas had been elected to serve as the next Bishop of Swansea and Brecon. He legally took up his see when his election was confirmed at a Sacred Synod for that purpose on 22 November 2021. He was consecrated a bishop on 26 February 2022, by Andy John, Archbishop of Wales and Bishop of Bangor, at Bangor Cathedral. This was one of John's first acts as the new archbishop; he had first to be elected by the Electoral College, which included all six bishops, including Lomas.

Church in Wales titles
Preceded by Chris Potter	Archdeacon of St Asaph; 2014–2018	Succeeded by Andy Grimwood
Preceded by Bob Griffiths	Archdeacon of Wrexham; 2018–2021	Succeeded by Hayley Matthews
Preceded by John Davies	Bishop of Swansea and Brecon; 2021–present	Incumbent
