= Dynevor School, Swansea =

Former secondary school in Wales

Information
- Former names: Swansea Municipal Secondary School; Dynevor Secondary Grammar School
- Established: 1883
- Closed: 2002

Dynevor School was a secondary school in Swansea, Wales, at times co-educational and at others for boys only. It was closed in 2002. The school's premises have been re-developed and are now used by the University of Wales Trinity Saint David (UWTSD).

The memory of the school is maintained in the form of the Old Dy’vorians Association

== History ==
The school opened in 1883 and moved to Dynevor Place in 1894 where it could accommodate 500 pupils. In 1907 it became Swansea Municipal Secondary School. In 1930 it changed its name to Dynevor School and from 1942 it was known as Dynevor Secondary Grammar School. In September 1971 it became a comprehensive school which amalgamated with Llwyn-y-Bryn Girls' School in 1978.

== Notable former pupils ==
- Spencer Davis, musician
- Nigel Evans, Conservative MP
- Flora Forster, educator
- Kevin Johns, actor and radio presenter
- Julian Lewis, Conservative MP
- David Mercer, (1960-1967), sports commentator
- Anthony Edward Pierce, Bishop of Swansea and Brecon from 1998 until 2008
- Mal Pope, musician and composer
- Sir Harry Secombe, comedian and entertainer
- Douglas Simons, local architect of schools and hospitals
- Christopher Rees, former Chair of the International Bar Association and Managing Partner of Bird & Bird LLP
- Rowan Williams, former Archbishop of Canterbury
