= Edward Lincoln Lewis =

Welsh priest (1865–1938)

Edward Lincoln Lewis was the archdeacon of St Davids from 1929 until 1936.

Lewis was born in 1865 and educated at the St David's College, Lampeter. He was ordained deacon in 1891, and priest in 1892. After curacies at Llanelly, and Llanwnda, he was Chaplain to the Bishop of St David's, John Owen. He held incumbencies in Llandyfaelog, Manorowen and Penally. He died in 1938.
