= Humfrey Edwards =

Welsh priest

Humphrey Edwards was an Anglican priest in 16th century Wales.

Edwards was educated at the University of Oxford. He held Livings at St Trillo, Llandrillo, Denbighshire and St Mary Woolnoth in the City of London. He was Archdeacon of St Asaph from 1554 to 1558.
