= John Davies (archbishop of Wales) =

Bishop of Swansea and Brecon, born 1953

The Right Reverend John Davies KStJ
- Archbishop of Wales
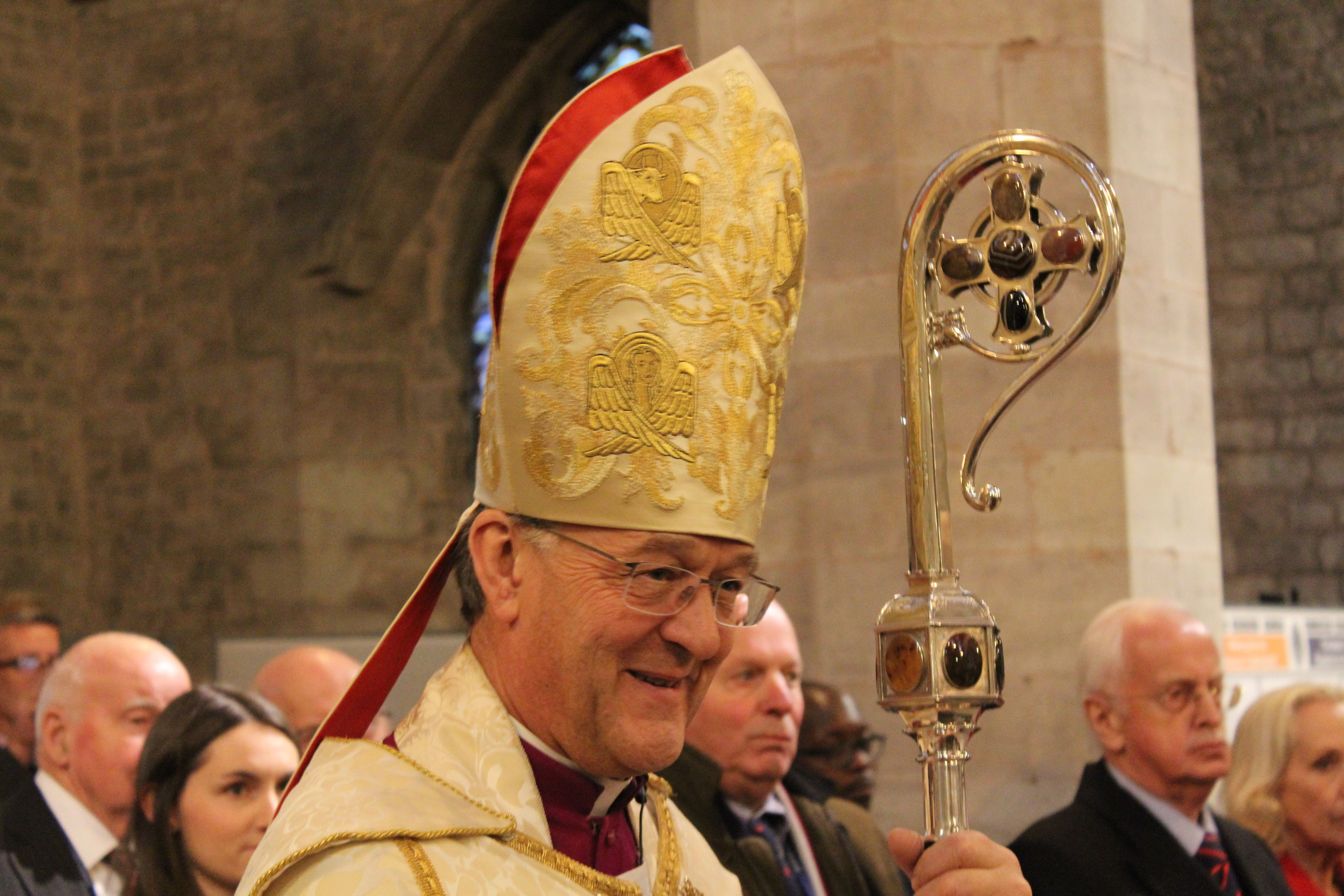
- Davies in 2017
- Diocese: Swansea and Brecon
- In office: 2017 to 2021
- Predecessor: Barry Morgan
- Successor: Andy John
- Other posts: Bishop of Swansea and Brecon (2008–2021); Dean of Brecon (2000–2008)

Orders
- Ordination: 1984 (deacon); 1985 (priest)
- Consecration: 2 May 2008 by Barry Morgan

Personal details
- Born: John David Edward Davies; 6 February 1953 (age 73) Newport, Wales
- Denomination: Anglicanism
- Spouse: Jo Davies (m. 1986)
- Children: 2
- Education: Bassaleg Grammar School
- Alma mater: University of Southampton; St. Michael's College, Llandaff; University of Wales; Cardiff University

John David Edward Davies KStJ (born 6 February 1953) is a retired Welsh Anglican bishop and former solicitor. From 2008 he was the Bishop of Swansea and Brecon in the Church in Wales. On 6 September 2017, he was also elected Archbishop of Wales; he continued in his role as diocesan bishop. He retired from both offices with effect from 2 May 2021.

== Early life and education ==
Davies was born on 6 February 1953 in Newport, Wales. He was educated at Bassaleg School, then a state grammar school. He studied law at the University of Southampton, graduating with a Bachelor of Laws (LLB) in 1974. From 1975 to 1977, he undertook his training contract and he was admitted as a solicitor in 1977. He then practised law in a private practice until leaving the profession to enter the church.

In 1982, Davies entered St. Michael's College, Llandaff, an Anglican theological college, to train for ordained ministry and to study theology. In 1984, he completed a Diploma in Theology (DipTh) with the University of Wales. He later undertook postgraduate studies in canon law at Cardiff University, and completed a Master of Laws (LLM) degree in 1995. He was awarded Honorary Doctorates in Law (LL.D)and Letters (D.Litt.) by the Universities of Swansea and Wales (Trinity St David).

== Ordained ministry ==
Davies was ordained in the Church in Wales as a deacon on 29 September 1984 and as a priest on 28 September 1985. From 1984 to 1986. he served his curacy at St Mary's Church, Chepstow in the Diocese of Monmouth. From 1986 to 1989, he was curate-in-charge of Michaelston-y-Fedw and Rudry. He was then Rector of Bedwas and Rudry between 1989 and 1995. From 1995 to 2000, he was Vicar of the Church of St John Evangelist in Newport.

In 2000, Davies moved to the Diocese of Swansea and Brecon where he had been appointed Dean of Brecon Cathedral. In 2005, he was additionally appointed priest-in-charge of Cynog Honddu.

=== Episcopal ministry ===
In January 2008, Davies was elected as the next bishop of Swansea and Brecon, in succession to Anthony Pierce; he legally took his see by the confirmation of the election (in Sacred Synod) during April. On 2 May 2008, he was consecrated as a bishop by Barry Morgan, the archbishop of Wales, during a service at Llandaff Cathedral. On 24 May 2008, he was installed in Brecon Cathedral as the ninth bishop of Swansea and Brecon.

As the senior bishop in Wales, Davies served as the acting archbishop of Wales in the vacancy following Barry Morgan's retirement on 31 January 2017. As such, he was the principal consecrator of June Osborne in July 2017.

On 6 September 2017, Davies was elected the 13th archbishop of Wales; he took up the post with the confirmation of that election the same day. He was the first bishop of Swansea and Brecon to be elected as archbishop of Wales. He was enthroned as archbishop at Brecon Cathedral on 2 December 2017.

In 2018, he became embroiled in a controversy involving Richard Pain, then the bishop of Monmouth, which ended with Pain leaving the bishopric on the grounds of ill health.

He retired both as Bishop of Swansea and Brecon and as Archbishop of Wales with effect from 2 May 2021.

== Personal life ==
In 1986, Davies married Joanna Lucy "Jo" Aulton; she works as a nurse in the NHS. Together they have two children: Kate and Christopher. On 15 March 2017 he was appointed as a Knight of the Order of St John.

Church in Wales titles
Preceded by Anthony Pierce	Bishop of Swansea and Brecon; 2008–2021	Succeeded by John Lomas
Preceded by Barry Morgan	Archbishop of Wales; 2017–2021	Succeeded by Andy John
Preceded by Geraint Hughes	Dean of Brecon Cathedral; 2000–2008	Succeeded by Geoffrey Marshall
