= Richard Roberts (priest) =

Welsh Anglican priest (1884–1970)

Richard Henry Roberts (23 April 1884 – 6 July 1970) was a Welsh Anglican clergyman in the Church in Wales who served as Archdeacon of St Asaph from 1942 to 1959.

He was born in Brynamman, Glamorgan, and educated at Keble College, Oxford, and ordained in 1908. He held incumbencies at Llangennech, Betws with Ammanford and Rhyl before his appointment as Archdeacon.

He retired in 1959 and died in Swansea in 1970.

Church in Wales titles
Preceded by Charles Roberts	Archdeacon of St Asaph; 1942–1959	Succeeded by John Edwards
