= David Evans (archdeacon of St Asaph) =

Welsh archdeacon

The Ven. David Evans was Archdeacon of St Asaph from 1897 to 1910.

He was born in Llanrhystud and educated in Ystrad Meurig. He was Rector of Bala then Rural Dean of Abergele, before his appointment as Archdeacon of St Asaph. He married Anne Walton, the daughter of James Walton.

Evans died in post on 1 March 1910; and his funeral was held three days later at St Asaph Cathedral.

== Notes ==
Church of England titles
Preceded by Hugh Jones	Archdeacon of St Asaph; 1897–1910	Succeeded by Thomas Lloyd
