= John Holdsworth (priest) =

Priest

John Holdsworth (born 1949) is a retired Anglican Archdeacon.

Holdsworth has four degrees from the University of Wales. He was ordained deacon in 1973, priest in 1974. After a curacy in Newport he was Vicar of Abercraf then Gorseinon. He was Warden of St. Michael's College, Llandaff from 1997 to 2003; Archdeacon of St David's from 2003 to 2010; and Archdeacon of Cyprus from 2010 until his retirement in 2019.
