= Ronald James Tree =

Welsh priest and teacher (1914–1970)

Ronald James Tree (1914–1970) was a Welsh priest and teacher.

Tree was born in Garnant and educated at the University of Wales and New College, Oxford. He was ordained deacon in 1940, and priest in 1941. After curacies in Cwmaman and Aberystwyth he was a lecturer at St David's College, Lampeter. Tree was Warden of Llandovery College from 1957 to 1966. He became Vicar of Haverfordwest in 1966 and Archdeacon of St Davids in 1968.
