= Christopher Gwynne Lewis =

Welsh Anglican priest

Christopher Gwynne Lewis MC (13 March 1895 – 31 January 1963) was a Welsh Anglican priest and Archdeacon of St David's from 1949 until 1962.

Lewis was educated at Jesus College, Oxford. He was ordained deacon in 1921, and priest in 1922. After curacies in Llanelly and Brecon he was priest in charge at Llandefalle. He held incumbencies at Llanbadarn Fawr and Prendergast.
