= Andy Grimwood =

British Anglican priest

Andrew Stuart Grimwood is an Anglican priest in the Church in Wales.

Grimwood was born in 1968; educated at Exeter University and St Michael's College, Llandaff; and ordained in 1999. His first job was with British Gas; he was made deacon at Petertide 1998 (27 June), by Roy Davies, Bishop of Llandaff; and ordained priest the following Petertide (27 June 1999), by Mark Wood, former Bishop of Ludlow (the See of Llandaff being in vacancy) — both times at Llandaff Cathedral. Grimwood began his ordained ministry as a curate in Llangynwyd, after which he was Priest in charge at Rhyl. He has also been the Incumbent at Llanllwchaiarn and Bodelwyddan. He has been Archdeacon of St Asaph since his collation at St Asaph Cathedral on 7 October 2018.

Church of England titles
Preceded by John Lomas	Archdeacon of St Asaph; 2018–present	Incumbent
