= Hugh Jones (archdeacon of St Asaph) =

Welsh priest

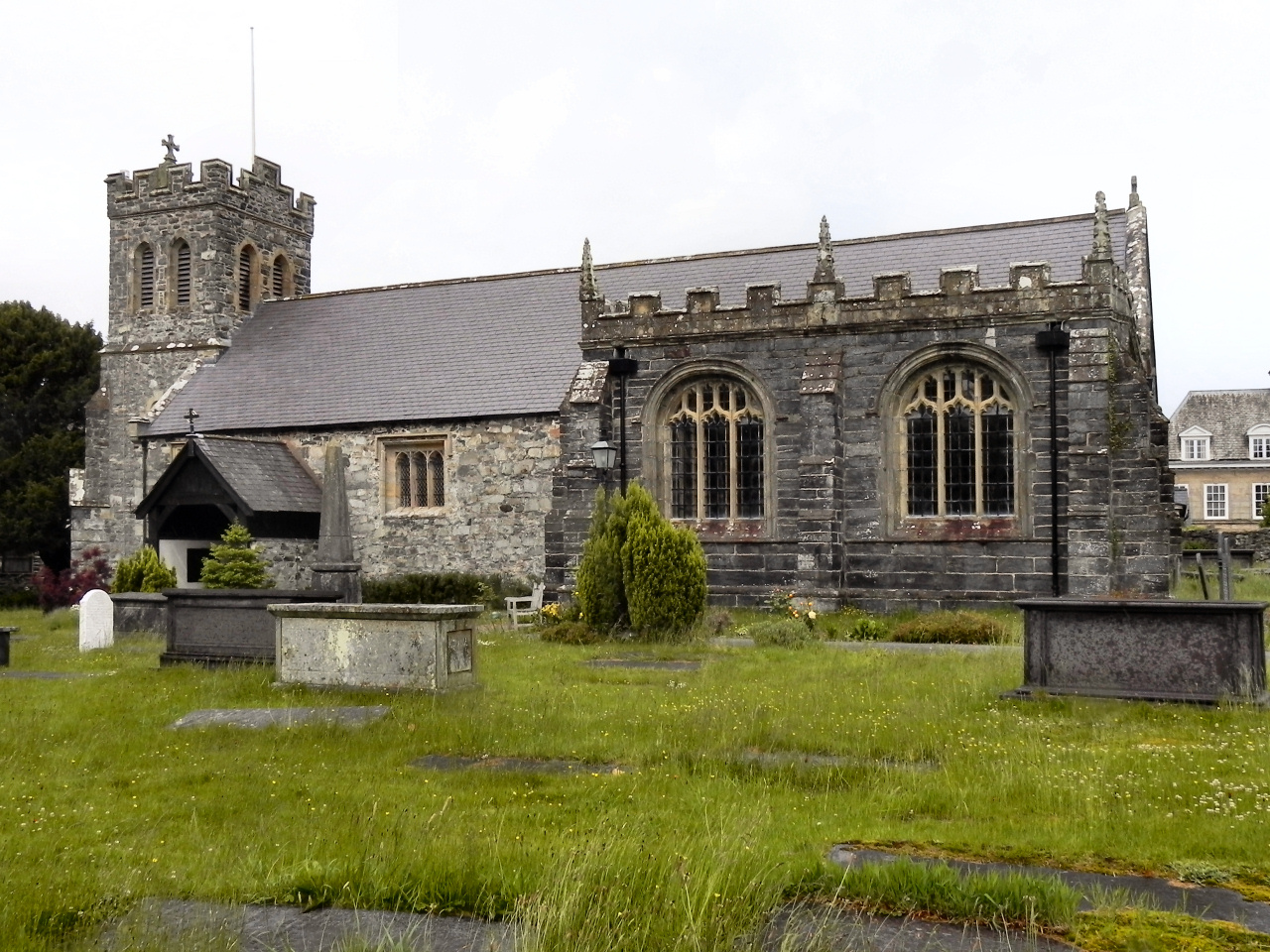
St Grwst's Church, Llanrwst, where Jones was rector

Hugh Jones (c. 1816 – 1897) was a Welsh Anglican clergyman, who had previously been an academic at Oxford University.

Jones was educated at Jesus College, Oxford, matriculating on 25 October 1832 at the age of 17. He was a scholar from 1834 to 1839, obtaining his B.A. degree in 1836 and his M.A. degree in 1839. He then became a Fellow of Jesus College, holding his fellowship form from 1839 to 1844, before being appointed by the college to the benefice of Holywell, Flintshire. He was rector of the parish for 24 years. He was later the rector of Llanrwst. He was appointed as a prebendary of St Asaph's Cathedral in 1850 and became a residentiary canon in 1860. He was appointed Archdeacon of St Asaph in 1892. His death at the age of 81 was announced in The Times on 19 June 1897.

Religious titles
Preceded by Watkin Williams	Archdeacon of St Asaph; 1892–1897	Succeeded by David Evans
