= Bishop of Swansea =

Anglican suffragan bishop in Wales

The Bishop of Swansea was an episcopal title used by a suffragan bishop of the Diocese of St Davids, in the Church of England Province of Canterbury until 1920 and then in the Church in Wales. It took its name after the town of Swansea, then in Glamorganshire; since the erection of the Diocese of Swansea and Brecon in 1923, the title has been united to the diocesan Bishop of Swansea and Brecon.

== List of bishops ==
Bishops of Swansea
From	Until	Incumbent	Notes
1890	1915	John Lloyd	Died in office.
1915	1923	Edward Bevan	Church in Wales from 1920; elected first diocesan Bishop of Swansea and Brecon at that diocese's erection.

== See also ==
- Swansea
