= June Osborne =

Former Dean of Salisbury, bishop of Diocese of Llandaff

The Right Reverend June Osborne
- Bishop of Llandaff
- Church: Church in Wales
- Diocese: Diocese of Llandaff
- In office: 14 July 2017 – 31 December 2022
- Predecessor: Barry Morgan
- Successor: Mary Stallard

Orders
- Ordination: 1980 (deaconess); 1987 (deacon); 1994 (priest)
- Consecration: 15 July 2017 by John Davies

Personal details
- Born: 10 June 1953 (age 73) Manchester, England
- Denomination: Anglican

June Osborne (born 10 June 1953) is a British retired Anglican bishop. From 2017 to 2022, she served as the bishop of Llandaff in the Church in Wales. Between 2004 and 2017, she served as the dean of Salisbury, and was the first woman to head one of England's medieval cathedrals.

== Early life ==
Osborne was born on 10 June 1953 in Manchester, England. She began studying law until she felt "the hand of Heaven" and decided to study for the ministry. She attended Manchester University, where she graduated in sociology, after which she worked as a lay person in parish ministry at St Aldate's Church, Oxford. She then moved to the administrative staff of the Universities and Colleges Christian Fellowship, where she directed the week-long 'Vocation 78' conference. This event, attended by 1400 evangelical students from the UK and overseas, aimed to help professionals develop "thorough-going Christian minds" so as to allow their faith to influence them in their work.

From UCCF she moved to Wycliffe Hall, Oxford to undertake ordination training, following a sense of calling to parish ministry: "Women should be prepared to put aside their natural reticence [to] take on full participation in the leadership in the church". She also stated that "the whole structure of ministry needs to be changed so that we do not put anybody in an isolated position at the top as happens at present. It should be a team". She was the first woman to take up a place at the previously all-male college. She also undertook training at St John's College, Nottingham.

== Ordained ministry ==
In 1980, Osborne became a deaconess at St Martin in the Bull Ring, Birmingham. She has also served at St Aldate's Church, Oxford, and in the Old Ford parishes in London. In the 1980s she was a regular speaker at the Greenbelt Christian music festival. She was made one of the first woman deacons in the Church of England in 1987. In 1989, she co-authored the "Osborne Report", a report for the House of Bishops of the Church of England on homosexuality.

Osborne was ordained to the priesthood in 1994, one of the first women to be ordained in England. There was much discussion at the previous year's General Synod as to whether or not to ordain female priests. The Times attributed Osborne's speech at the synod "for swinging the General Synod vote in favour of female priests".

She moved in the following year to Salisbury, where she served as canon treasurer until her appointment as dean. She was dean of Salisbury from 1 May 2004 until July 2017. She was the first woman to serve as a Dean at Salisbury Cathedral and the first at any of England's medieval cathedrals. She had served as acting dean since the retirement of her predecessor, Derek Watson, in 2002.

She is interested in interfaith dialogue and, in 2017, participated in the Board of World Religious Leaders for the Elijah Interfaith Institute.

=== Episcopal ministry ===
In 2014, after the vote to allow for the consecration of women as bishops, there was speculation that Osborne could become the first female bishop in the Church of England.

On 27 April 2017, it was announced that Osborne would be the next bishop of Llandaff in the Church in Wales. Her election was confirmed at a sacred synod meeting on 14 July 2017, whereby she legally took up her new post. She was consecrated a bishop on 15 July 2017 by John Davies, bishop of Swansea and Brecon, during a service at Brecon Cathedral. She was the second woman to become a bishop in the Church in Wales, after the Bishop of St Davids Joanna Penberthy, who was consecrated in January the same year. She was installed as bishop during a service at Llandaff Cathedral on 22 July 2017.

In November 2021, the media published allegations of bullying within the diocese of Llandaff. Osborne was accused in a 2020 complaint of bullying the dean of Llandaff, the Very Reverend Gerwyn Capon. It was reported that preliminary investigations completed in May 2021 suggested that, on the balance of probability, Osborne had a case to answer. In December of that year, a local vicar, alleging a general "culture of fear" in the diocese, called for Osborne to be suspended while the case was considered. The case was dismissed in April 2022, following the withdrawal by the dean of his complaint. The Dean announced his resignation on 17 May 2022.

In September 2022, it was announced that Osborne would be retiring later that year. A farewell service was held at Llandaff Cathedral on 30 November 2022. She officially retired on 31 December 2022.

== Personal life ==
She is married to Paul Goulding KC, a barrister. They have two children.

From 2006 to 2017 she served as a deputy lieutenant for Wiltshire (DL).

Church in Wales titles
Preceded by Barry Morgan	Bishop of Llandaff; 2017–2022	Succeeded by Mary Stallard
