= Paul Mackness =

Welsh Anglican priest (born 1973)

Paul Robert Mackness (born 1973) is currently the Dean of St Davids, since 17th October 2026. Previous to this he served as the Archdeacon of St Davids from March 2018 - October 2026.

Mackness was educated at the University of Wales, Lampeter, and studied for the priesthood at St Michael's College, Llandaff; he was made deacon at Petertide 2001 (23 June) by Huw Jones, Bishop of St Davids, at St Davids Cathedral; and ordained priest the following Petertide (29 June 2002). After a curacy at Llanelli he was Rector of Manordeifi from 2004 to 2010, then Vicar of Haverfordwest until 2014. He was Bishop's Chaplain and Clerical Secretary in the Diocese of St Davids from April 2014 until July 2018. He was collated archdeacon on 22 March 2018.

On the 14th September 2026, it was announced that Mackness had been appointed the new Dean of St Davids, following the stepping down of Sarah Rowland Jones in July 2026. He was installed as Dean on the 17th October 2026.

Church in Wales titles
| Preceded by Dennis Wight | Archdeacon of St Davids; 2018–2026 | Succeeded by Leigh Richardson |
| Preceded by Sarah Rowland Jones | Dean of St Davids; 2026-present | Incumbent |
