= Anian II (bishop of St Asaph) =

Welsh bishop

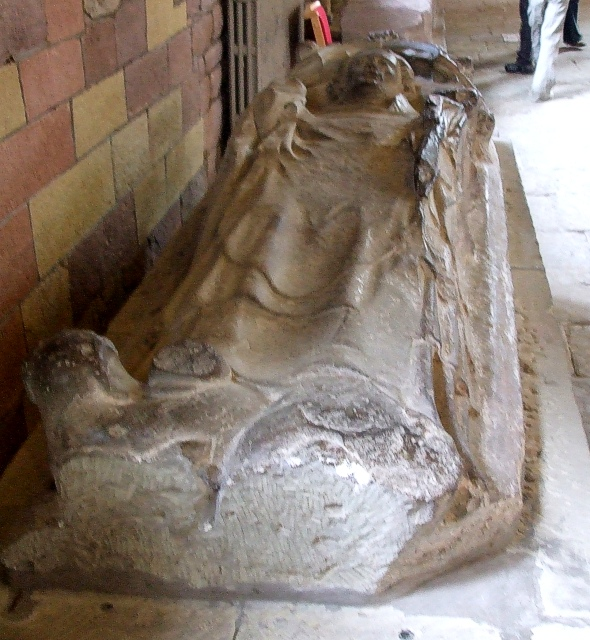
Effigy of Anian II, St Asaph Cathedral

Anian II (Anian Schonaw) was Bishop of the Diocese of St Asaph between 1268 and 1293. On his death in 1293 he was succeeded by Llywelyn de Bromfield.
