= Thomas Lloyd (bishop) =

Welsh Anglican bishop

Thomas Lloyd (1857 – 14 March 1935) was a Welsh bishop in the Anglican Church.

He was educated at Ystrad Meurig School and St David's College, Lampeter, and ordained in 1882. He began his career as a curate in Denbigh. He held incumbencies at Bala, Abergele and Rhyl.

He was Archdeacon of St Asaph from 1910 and the only Bishop of Maenan (a suffragan bishop to A. G. Edwards, Bishop of St Asaph and Archbishop of Wales) from 1928, holding both posts until his death on 14 March 1935. He was ordained and consecrated a bishop on St Andrew's day (30 November) 1928 at St Asaph Cathedral, by Edwards as Archbishop of Wales.

Church in Wales titles
Preceded by David Evans	Archdeacon of St Asaph; 1910–1935	Succeeded by Charles Roberts
