= John Smith (bishop of Llandaff) =

Bishop of Llandaff from 1476 to 1479

John Smith or Smyth (died 1479) was bishop of Llandaff from 1476 to 1479.

He had previously held positions as vicar of Tenby, and archdeacon of St David's. These posts are known from an inscription on the Tenby chancel wainscotting presumably erected on Smith's initiative and (in default of evidence from St. David's Cathedral registers) personally examined by Edward Yardley. He was buried in the church of the Grey Friars in London.

He supplied William Worcester with a list of Welsh saints included in Worcester's 1478 Journeys.

== Sources ==
- Edward Yardley, Menevia Sacra (circa 1739-1761), ed. Francis Green (Cambrian Archaeological Association), 1927, p. .
- A. B. Emden, A Biographical Register of the University of Oxford to A.D. 1500, Volume III P to Z, Oxford, 1959; 1716.
- William Worcestre, Itineraries, ed. by John H. Harvey, Clarendon Press, 1969, p. 75.
