= Charles Roberts (archdeacon of St Asaph) =

Welsh Anglican priest (1862–1942)

Charles Frederic Roberts FSA (20 January 1862 – 23 March 1942) was a Welsh Anglican clergyman who served as Archdeacon of St Asaph in the Church in Wales from 1935 to 1942.

He was born Llanelidan, Denbighshire, into an ecclesiastical family, the son of David Robert, sometime Rector of Llanelidan and educated at Ruthin School and Christ's College, Cambridge. He was ordained in 1886 and held curacies in Llanelidan, Llanfyllin and Newtown. He was Vicar Choral of St Asaph Cathedral from 1895 to 1897; and Rector of Llanddulas until 1933 when he became a Canon Residentiary at St Asaph Cathedral.

He died in post on 23 March 1942.

Church in Wales titles
Preceded by Thomas Lloyd	Archdeacon of St Asaph; 1935–1942	Succeeded by Richard Roberts
