= David Herbert Lloyd =

Welsh Anglican priest (1899–1967)

David Herbert Lloyd (1899-1967) was the Archdeacon of St Davids from 1963 to his death.

Lloyd was educated at St David's College, Lampeter. He was ordained deacon in 1922, and priest in 1923. After curacies in Swansea and Tycroes he held incumbencies in Marloes, Fishguard, Llanbadarn Fawr and Prendergast.
