= Edward Bevan (bishop) =

Welsh churchman (1861–1934)

Edward Latham "Teddy" Bevan (27 October 1861 – 2 February 1934) was a Welsh churchman, the inaugural Bishop of Swansea and Brecon from 1923 until his death, having previously been the final suffragan Bishop of Swansea.

== Early life ==
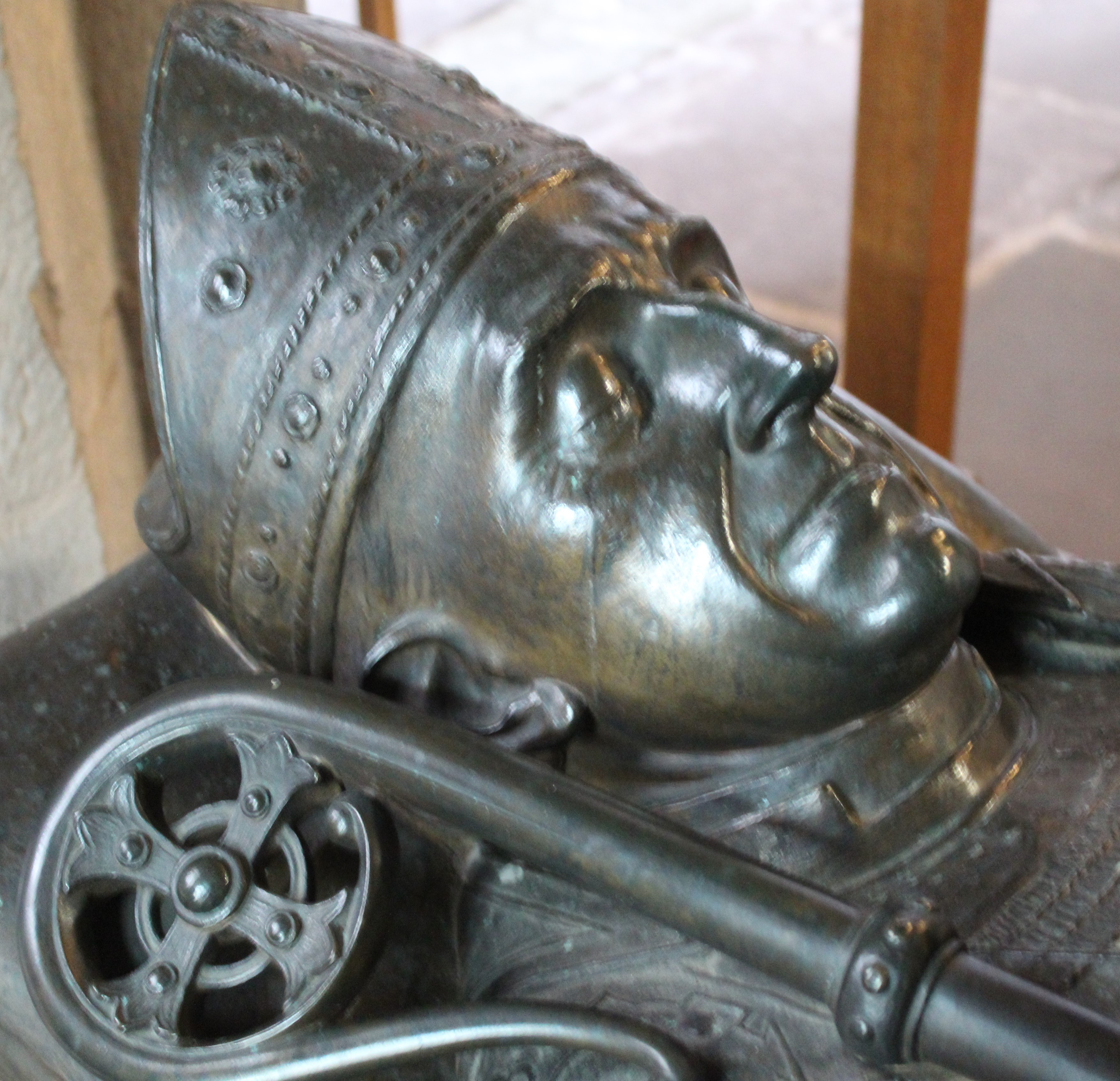
Bronze effigy of Bevan by Goscombe John in Brecon Cathedral

Edward Latham Bevan was born in Weymouth on 27 October 1861. Francis Kilvert refers to him as "Teddy" in his diary. He was the youngest son of William Latham Bevan and Louisa Dew, and nephew of George Phillips Bevan.

== Education ==
He graduated from Hertford College, Oxford with a B.A. in 1884. At some point he gained a Doctorate of Divinity.

== Career ==
Bevan was ordained in 1886 and began his career with a curacy at Holy Trinity Church, Weymouth. In 1891, he became chaplain of the Gordon Boys’ Home in Worthing, and then, in 1897, became vicar of Brecon. In 1907, he succeeded his father as Archdeacon of Brecon.

He was appointed an acting Chaplain to the 1st (Brecknockshire) Volunteer Battalion, South Wales Borderers (of which his father had been an Honorary Chaplain since 1860) and in 1907 he succeeded his father as Hon Chaplain to the battalion, retaining the role until World War I.

He was first appointed to the episcopate as the Bishop of Swansea, a suffragan bishop in the Diocese of St Davids, ordained and consecrated a bishop on 29 September 1915 by Randall Davidson, Archbishop of Canterbury, at Canterbury Cathedral. He became the first Bishop of Swansea and Brecon upon the erection of that diocese eight years later in 1923.

He was the national chairman of the Church of England Men's Society.

== Death ==
He died on 2 February 1934 at Ely Tower, Brecon, and was buried at Brecon Cathedral. He never married, and his family home became the residence of his successors as Bishop of Swansea and Brecon.

Church in Wales titles
Preceded by John Lloyd	Bishop of Swansea; 1915–1923	last suffragan (diocese erected)
New title	Bishop of Swansea and Brecon; 1923–1934	Succeeded by John Morgan
