= Alwyn Rice Jones =

Welsh bishop

The Right Reverend Alwyn Rice Jones
- Archbishop of Wales
- Church: Church in Wales
- Diocese: Diocese of St Asaph
- In office: 1991 to 1999
- Predecessor: George Noakes
- Successor: Rowan Williams
- Other post: Bishop of St Asaph (1981–1999)

Orders
- Ordination: 1 June 1958 (deacon); 24 May 1959 (priest) by Gwilym Williams
- Consecration: 29 June 1982 by Gwilym Williams

Personal details
- Born: 25 March 1934 Capel Curig, Caernarvonshire, Wales
- Died: 12 August 2007 (aged 73)
- Denomination: Anglicanism
- Spouse: Meriel Thomas (m. 1968)
- Children: One
- Education: St David's College, Lampeter; Fitzwilliam College, Cambridge; St Michael's College, Llandaff

Alwyn Rice Jones (25 March 1934 – 12 August 2007) was Bishop of St Asaph from 1981 to 1999 and also Archbishop of Wales, the Welsh province of the Anglican Communion, from 1991 to 1999. During Rice Jones' tenure, the Church of Wales reformed its rules in order to ordain women priests, and to allow divorcees to remarry in church.

== Early and private life ==
Rice Jones was born in Capel Curig in Caernarvonshire, and spoke Welsh as his first language. He was educated at the grammar school in Llanrwst, and was orphaned at the age of 14. He read Welsh at St David's College, Lampeter, graduating in 1955, and then read theology at Fitzwilliam College, Cambridge, graduating in 1957.

He married Meriel Thomas in 1968. They had a daughter together. He suffered from ill health in later life, and was cared for by his wife. He died in St Asaph in Denbighshire, and was survived by his wife and daughter.

== Ordained ministry ==
Rice Jones trained for the ministry at St Michael's College, Llandaff. He was made a deacon on Trinity Sunday (1 June) 1958 and ordained a priest the following Trinity (24 May 1959), both times by Gwilym Williams, Bishop of Bangor, at Bangor Cathedral. The early years of his ecclesiastical career were assisted by Williams' patronage, who recognised his talents. He was a curate in Llanfair-is-gaer for four years, also serving as chaplain of St Winifred's School, Llanfairfechan, and with the Student Christian Movement of Great Britain in Wales. He was Director of Education in the Diocese of Bangor from 1965 to 1975. He served as Vicar of Porthmadog from 1975 to 1979, developing close relationships with the local Roman Catholic church, and was an Honorary Canon at Bangor Cathedral from 1974 to 1978. He was Prebendary of Llanfair for one year, from 1978 to 1979, before becoming Dean of Brecon Cathedral.

=== Episcopal ministry ===
He was installed as Bishop of St Asaph in 1982, and as Archbishop of Wales on 30 November 1991. His consecration as a bishop was at Petertide 1982 (29 June); like his previous ordinations, it was at Bangor Cathedral and led by Gwilym Williams, by then Archbishop of Wales as well as Bishop of Bangor.

Rice Jones adhered to a liberal theology, and supported ecumenism. He supported the ordination of women, but his first attempt to bring a measure in 1994 to make the reform failed. His second attempt, in 1996, was passed, and the first female priests were ordained the following year. He courted controversy by condemning the NATO bombing of Kosovo in 1999.

He attended the World Council of Churches Assembly in Canberra in 1991, and the Anglican Consultative Council in Cape Town in 1993. At the Lambeth Conference in 1998, he persuaded the Welshmen present (including Rowan Williams) to entertain their guests during a Welsh cultural evening by singing or telling jokes.

He was a member of the Welsh Gorsedd of Bards and regularly attended the National Eisteddfod. He supported Welsh devolution, arguing that the disestablishment of the Church of Wales in 1920 made it stronger. He took part in the special service to mark the opening of the National Assembly for Wales in May 1999.

He retired in 1999, shortly after his 65th birthday, and was succeeded as Archbishop of Wales by Rowan Williams, Bishop of Monmouth, who would later become the Archbishop of Canterbury.

Church in Wales titles
Preceded by Harold John Charles	Bishop of St Asaph; 1981–1999	Succeeded by John Stewart Davies
Preceded by George Noakes	Archbishop of Wales; 1991–1999	Succeeded by Rowan Williams
