= Chris Potter (priest) =

British priest

Christopher Nicholas Lynden Potter is a retired Anglican priest.

Potter was born on 4 October 1949, educated at Haileybury and the University of Leeds and ordained in 1993 after an earlier career as a furniture designer and cabinet maker. He began his ordained ministry as a curate in Flint, after which he was vicar of the grouped parishes of Llanfair DC, Llanelidan, Efenechtyd and Derwen, a post he held until his appointment as Dean of Asaph. He was Archdeacon of St Asaph from 2011 until 2014.

Church in Wales titles
Preceded by Thomas Richard Kerry Goulstone	Dean of St Asaph; 2001–2011	Succeeded by Nigel Williams
Preceded by Bernard Thomas	Archdeacon of St Asaph; 2011–2014	Succeeded by John Lomas
