= Graham James Davies =

Welsh Anglican priest (1935–2023)

Graham James Davies (1935 – 17 January 2023) was the Archdeacon of St Davids from 1996 until 2002.

Davies was educated at St David's College, Lampeter. After curacies in Johnston, Pembrokeshire, and Llangathen, he was a Minor Canon at St David's Cathedral. He held incumbencies at Hubberston, Cwmdauddwr and Kidwelly before his appointment as archdeacon.

He died in 2023, aged 87.
