= Joshua Pritchard Hughes =

British bishop (1847–1938)

The Right Reverend Joshua Pritchard Hughes
- Bishop of Llandaff
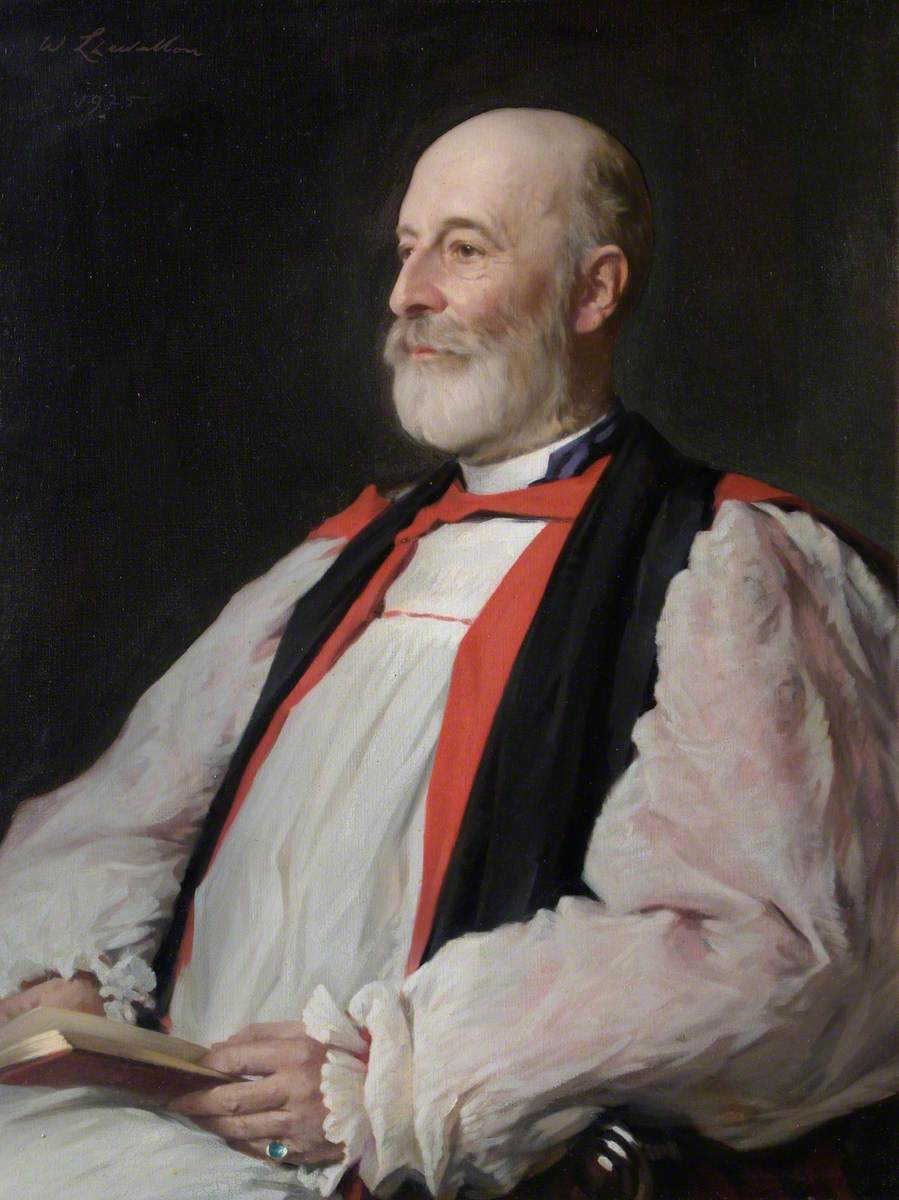
- 1925 portrait by William Llewellyn.
- Diocese: Diocese of Llandaff
- In office: 1905–1931
- Predecessor: Richard Lewis
- Successor: Timothy Rees

Personal details
- Born: 13 February 1847 Llandovery, Carmarthenshire
- Died: 8 April 1938 (aged 91)
- Buried: Eridge, Sussex
- Denomination: Anglican
- Parents: Joshua Hughes; Margaret McKenny
- Education: Shrewsbury School; Balliol College, Oxford

Joshua Pritchard Hughes (13 February 1847 – 8 April 1938) was Bishop of Llandaff from 1905 to 1931.

Hughes was born into an ecclesiastical family, the son of Joshua Hughes (Bishop of St Asaph 1870–1889). His older brother was the geologist Thomas McKenny Hughes. He was educated at Shrewsbury School and Balliol College, Oxford and ordained in 1871. He was a curate in Neath from 1872 to 1877, vicar of Newcastle, Bridgend from 1878 to 1884 and then Llantrisant from 1884 to 1905 before his ordination to the episcopate.

The Dahlia 'Bishop of Llandaff' was selected by him and named in his honour.

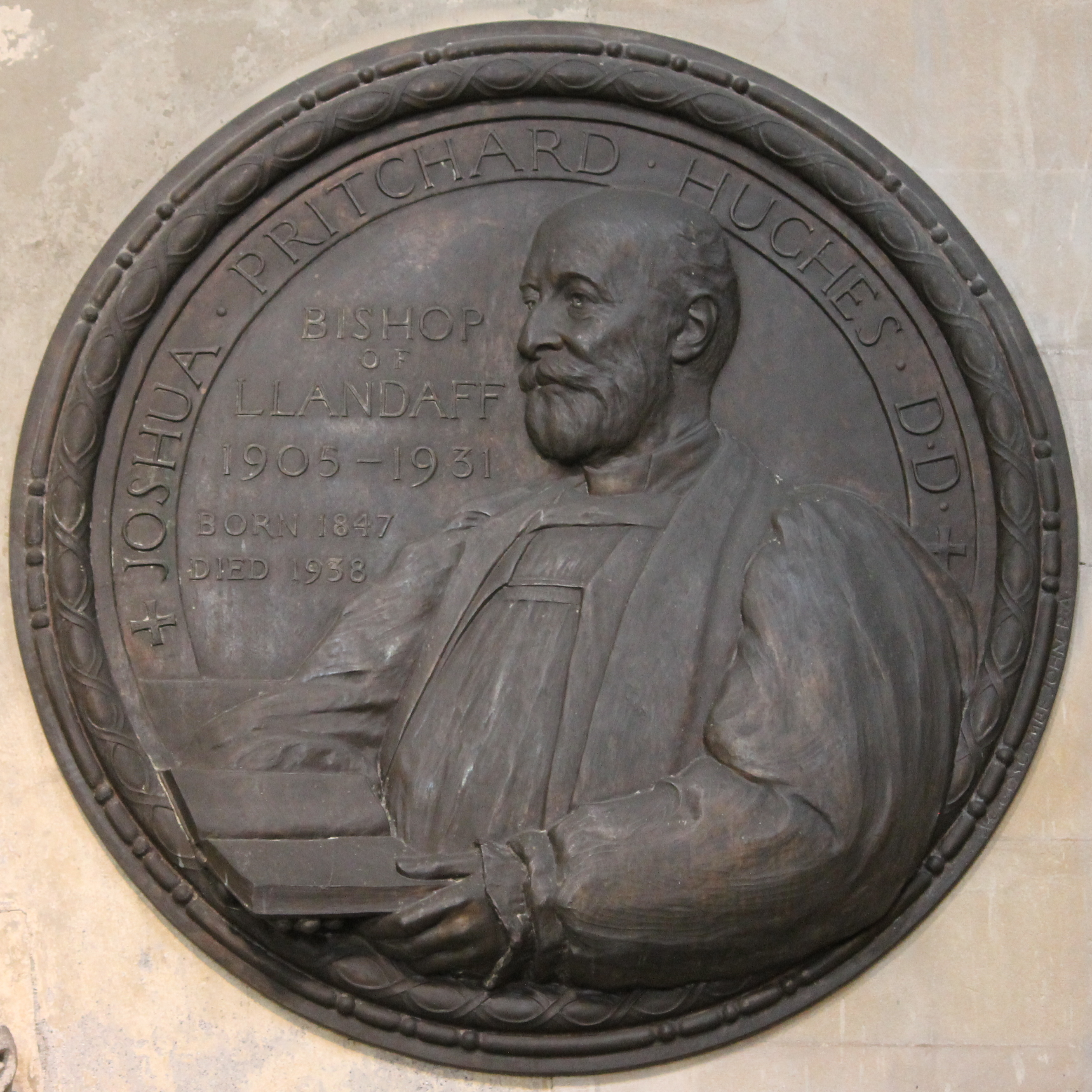
Memorial to Joshua Pritchard Hughes in Llandaff Cathedral (1940) by Goscombe John

Church in Wales titles
Preceded by Richard Lewis	Bishop of Llandaff; 1905–1931	Succeeded by Timothy Rees
