= John Jones (archdeacon of St Asaph) =

Archdeacon of St Asaph

John Jenkin Jones was Archdeacon of St Asaph from 1974 to 1984.

He was born in 1905 and educated at University College, Durham, and ordained in 1941. He began his career with curacies at Denbigh, Colwyn Bay and Northop. He held incumbencies at St Martin Eglwysbach, St James, Holywell and St Eleri, Llanrhos. He was Rural Dean of Holywell from 1969 to 1974 when he became archdeacon of the surrounding area. He retired in 1978; and died in 1996.

== Notes ==
Church in Wales titles
Preceded by William Rees	Archdeacon of St Asaph; 1974–1984	Succeeded by Selwyn Closs-Parry
