= Richard Owen (priest) =

Welsh priest

The Ven. Richard Henry Owen was Archdeacon of St Asaph from 1964 to 1970.

He was born in 1899 and educated at the University of Wales and ordained in 1921. He began his career as a Curate in Colwyn Bay. After this he held incumbencies at Llantysilio, Bangor-on-Dee, Rhosymedre and Prestatyn, and finally St John's Church, Trofarth.

He died on 19 August 1977.

== Notes ==
Church in Wales titles
Preceded by John Edwards	Archdeacon of St Asaph; 1964–1970	Succeeded by William Rees
