= John Bouland =

Welsh cleric (died 1400)

John Bouland (died 1 December 1400) was a Canon of Windsor from 1381 to 1400 and Archdeacon of St David's from 1388.

== Career ==
He was appointed:

- Rector of Artureth, 1361
- Prebendary of Lichfield Cathedral 1386
- Archdeacon of St David's 1388

He was appointed to the second stall in St George's Chapel, Windsor Castle in 1381, and held the stall until 1400.
