= Nigel Williams (priest) =

Welsh Anglican priest

The Very Reverend Nigel Williams
- Dean of St Asaph
- Church: Church in Wales
- Diocese: St Asaph
- In office: September 2011 – present
- Predecessor: Chris Potter

Orders
- Ordination: 1995 (deacon); 1996 (priest)

Personal details
- Born: Nigel Howard Williams; September 1963 (age 62)
- Denomination: Anglicanism
- Education: Llysfasi Agricultural College; St Michael's College, Llandaff; University of Wales, Cardiff

Nigel Howard Williams (born September 1963) is a Welsh Anglican priest. Since 2011, he has served as Dean of St Asaph.

== Life and career ==
Williams was born in September 1963. He grew up in Llansannan, was educated at Llysfasi Agricultural College and worked as a depot manager in Llanrwst. He trained for the priesthood at St Michael's College, Llandaff and the University of Wales, Cardiff, and was ordained deacon in 1995 and priest in 1996, serving as a curate at St Mary's, Denbigh. In 1998 he was appointed rector of Llanrwst and Llanddoged, and in 2004 he became vicar of St Paul's Church, Colwyn Bay, and Area Dean of Rhos. From 2008, he served as vicar of Colwyn Bay with Bryn-y-Maen.

After being appointed Dean of St Asaph in June 2011, he was installed as Dean on 17 September.

He is a fluent Welsh speaker.

Church in Wales titles
Preceded by Chris Potter	Dean of St Asaph; 2011–	Incumbent
