= John Edwards (archdeacon of St Asaph) =

Archdeacon from England

The Ven. John Lewis Edwards (1889-1976) was Archdeacon of St Asaph from 1959 until his retirement in 1964.

He was educated at St David's College, Lampeter, and Keble College, Oxford, and ordained in 1915. He began his career with curacies at Minera and Rhyl. After this he held incumbencies at Llanfwrog, Rhosllannerchrugog, Llanrhos and Deganwy. He was Rural Dean of Llanrwst until his appointment as Archdeacon.

== Notes ==
Church in Wales titles
Preceded by Richard Roberts	Archdeacon of St Asaph; 1959–1964	Succeeded by Richard Owen
