= Bickerton Edwards =

Bickerton Cross Edwards was a Welsh Anglican priest: the Archdeacon of St Davids from 1942 until his death in 1949.

Edwards was born in 1874 and educated at St Catherine's Society, Oxford. He was ordained deacon in 1897, and priest in 1898. After curacies in Gresford and Rhyl he was Chaplain at Madeira. He held incumbencies in Sharnbrook and Tenby. He was Treasurer of St Davids Cathedral from 1940 to 1942.
