= George Noakes =

British Anglican bishop

The Right Reverend George Noakes
- Archbishop of Wales
- Church: Church in Wales
- Diocese: Diocese of St Davids
- In office: 1986 to 1991
- Predecessor: Derrick Childs
- Successor: Alwyn Rice Jones
- Other post: Bishop of St Davids (1982–1991)
- Previous post: Archdeacon of Cardigan (1979–1982)

Orders
- Ordination: 1950 (deacon); 1952 (priest)
- Consecration: 1982

Personal details
- Born: 13 September 1924
- Died: 14 July 2008 (aged 83)
- Denomination: Anglicanism

George Noakes (13 September 1924 – 14 July 2008) was a Welsh Anglican bishop, who served as Bishop of St Davids (1982–1991) and the Archbishop of Wales (1986–1991), head of the Church in Wales.

== Biography ==
Noakes was born on 13 September 1924 in Ceredigion, Wales. His family life was bi-lingual. He was educated at Tregaron Grammar School, and then served in the Royal Air Force Volunteer Reserve (RAFVR) during the Second World War. After training in Canada, he flew with Bomber Command. He studied philosophy at University College, Aberystwyth, graduating with a second class honours Bachelor of Arts (BA) degree in 1948. He then trained for ordination at Wycliffe Hall, Oxford.

Noakes was ordained in the Church in Wales as a deacon in 1950 and as a priest in 1952. From 1950 to 1955, he served his curacy in Lampeter in the Diocese of St Davids. He was then successively vicar of Eglwyswrw; Tregaron; Eglwys Dewi Sant, Cardiff, a Welsh language church in Cardiff; and Aberystwyth. He was additionally made a canon of St Davids Cathedral in 1977. He served as Archdeacon of Cardigan from 1979 to 1982. He was elevated to the episcopate as Bishop of St Davids in 1982. In 1987, he was additionally elected Archbishop of Wales, the head of the Church in Wales. He was a supporter of the ordination of women to the priesthood. Ill health led to him resigning as Bishop of St Davids and Archbishop of Wales in 1991.

He died on 14 July 2008, aged 83.

Church in Wales titles
Preceded by Eric Roberts	Bishop of St Davids; 1981–1991	Succeeded by Ivor Rees
Preceded by Derrick Childs	Archbishop of Wales; 1986–1991	Succeeded by Alwyn Rice Jones
