= Richard Harford =

16th Century Welsh Anglican Priest

Richard Harford was a Welsh Anglican priest in the 16th century.

Harford was educated at Merton College, Oxford. He held livings at Canon Frome, Bromsgrove, Richard's Castle and Woolhope. Harford was Archdeacon of St Davids from 1557 to 1581.
