= Gwilym Williams =

Archbishop of Wales (1971 to 1982)

The Right Reverend Gwilym Williams
- Archbishop of Wales
- Church: Church in Wales
- In office: 1971–1981
- Predecessor: Glyn Simon
- Successor: Derrick Childs
- Other post: Bishop of Bangor (1957–1981)

Orders
- Ordination: 1937 (deacon); 1938 (priest)
- Consecration: 1957 by John Morgan

Personal details
- Born: Gwilym Owen Williams; 23 March 1913 Finchley, London, England
- Died: 23 December 1990 (aged 77)
- Denomination: Anglicanism
- Education: Jesus College, Oxford

Gwilym Owen Williams (23 March 1913 – 23 December 1990) was a prominent figure in the Church in Wales who served as Bishop of Bangor from 1957 to 1982 and Archbishop of Wales from 1971 to 1982.

== Biography ==
Williams was born to a deeply religious family in East Finchley, Greater London. He attended Brynrefail Grammar school and at Jesus College, Oxford He took first-class honours in English in 1933, and theology in 1935. He was made a deacon at Michaelmas 1937 (18 September) and ordained priest the following Michaelmas (24 September 1938) — both times by William Havard, Bishop of St Asaph, at St Asaph Cathedral. He served as curate at St Asaph until 1940, when he was appointed chaplain at St David's College, Lampeter. In 1945 he moved to Bangor to take up a post as chaplain and tutor at St. Mary's College, Bangor, and as Lecturer in Theology at the University of Wales, Bangor.

In 1947 he became a Canon of Bangor Cathedral, and in 1948 moved to become headmaster of Llandovery College. He was elected Bishop of Bangor in 1957, consecrated a bishop by John Morgan, Archbishop of Wales and Bishop of Llandaff, at Llandaff Cathedral on 1 May 1957 and installed at Bangor Cathedral the following week. Williams became Archbishop of Wales in 1971, also continuing as Bishop of Bangor until his retirement in 1982.

Williams was passionate about preserving the Welsh language and he would later gain prominence as a member of a deputation of three who challenged Margaret Thatcher in her attempt to reduce the status of the Welsh language. The Welsh language meant a lot to him personally, and because of this he ensured that there should a new translation of the Bible in Welsh. He was also influential in the decision to ordain women priests and the creation of the first Welsh television station S4C. When a new Welsh version of the Bible was published Williams was invited to preach before Queen Elizabeth II in St Asaph and Westminster Abbey.

Church in Wales titles
Preceded by John Charles Jones	Bishop of Bangor; 1957–1982	Succeeded by Cledan Mears
Preceded by Glyn Simon	Archbishop of Wales; 1971–1982	Succeeded by Derrick Childs
