= Anian I (bishop of St Asaph) =

Welsh bishop

Anian I was Bishop of the Diocese of St Asaph between 1249 and 1266. Previous to his appointment he was known as Einion ap Maredudd. Anian was appointed in a time of relative peace, with the area under the authority of the crown. When Llywelyn ap Gruffydd began his campaign to control the area in 1256 Anian was persuaded to remain faithful to the crown, in return for the King's protection. By 1261 however, Llywelyn's position had grown stronger, as did Anian's own support for him, "standing as head of a panel of arbitrators chosen by the parties to settle matters in dispute between the prince and Bishop Richard of Bangor (Rhyd-yr-arw, 28 and 29 April)", and acknowledging Llywelyn's authority without question. On his death in 1266 he was succeeded by John II.
