= Cyril John Harvey =

Archdeacon in the Church in Wales

Cyril John Harvey (born 1930) is a Welsh Anglican priest who served as the Archdeacon of St Davids from 1991 until 1996.

Harvey was educated at the University of Wales, Lampeter, and studied for the priesthood at the College of the Resurrection; and was ordained deacon in 1953, and priest in 1954. After curacies at Caerau with Ely, Cardiff, and Milford Haven, he was Rector of Begelly from 1965 to 1973; Vicar of Haverfordwest from 1973 to 1988; and Vicar of Tenby from 1988 to 1996.
