= Cledan Mears =

British bishop (1922–2014)

John Cledan Mears (8 September 1922 – 13 July 2014) was the Anglican Bishop of Bangor from 1982 to 1992.

Mears was born on 8 September 1922. He was educated at the University of Wales in Aberystwyth. Ordained in 1947, he began his ministry with curacies at Mostyn and Rhosllannerchrugog before being appointed Vicar of Cwm. From 1959 to 1973 he was a lecturer at Cardiff University after which he became the vicar of St Mark's Gabalfa, his last position before his ordination to the episcopate.

Church in Wales titles
Preceded by Gwilym Williams	Bishop of Bangor; 1982–1992	Succeeded by Barry Morgan
