= Charles Edmondes =

British academic (1838–1893)

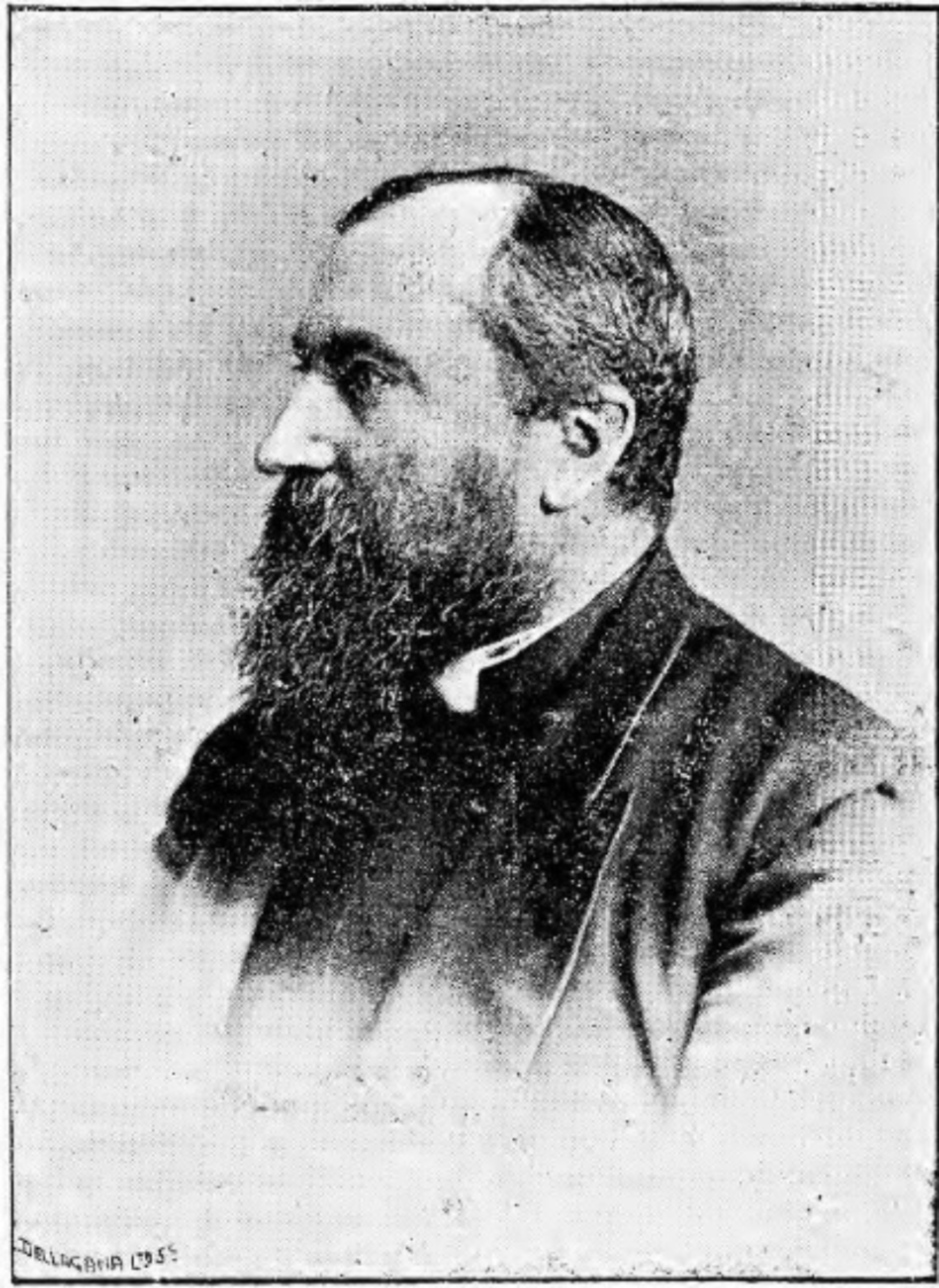
Charles Gresford Edmondes

Charles Gresford Edmondes (1838–1893) was an archdeacon and college principal.

He was the son of Thomas Edmondes the vicar of Cowbridge; his uncle was Charles Williams (1806–1877), who later became principal of Jesus College, Oxford; his brother, Frederick William Edmondes (1841–1918) became archdeacon of Llandaff.

He was educated at Sherborne and Trinity College, Oxford, where he graduated with a first in classical moderations in 1856. After some years as Curate of Bridgend, he was, from 1865 to 1881, professor of Latin at St David's College, Lampeter (now part of University of Wales Trinity Saint David). After vicariates at Boughrood, Radnorshire (1881), and Warren, Pembrokeshire (1882-8) he was, in 1883, made Archdeacon of St David's.

He resigned his office in 1888 to become principal of St David's College, and remained there until his health broke down in 1892. He died on 18 July 1893.

He was for many years an assiduous member of the Cambrian Archaeological Association.

Academic offices
Preceded by Herbert Edward Ryle	Principal of St David's College; 1888–1892	Succeeded by John Owen
