= Keith Smalldon =

Keith Smalldon (born 1948 in Newport) was the Archdeacon of St Davids from 2011 until 2013.

Smalldon studied for the priesthood at St. Michael's College, Llandaff; and was ordained as a deacon in 1971, priest in 1972. He graduated BA from The Open University in 1976 and MA from Newcastle in 1994. After curacies in Cwmbran and Chepstow he was Youth and Community Officer for the Diocese of Bradford from 1975 to 1979; and in Manchester from 1982 to 1990. He was Director of Clergy Training for the Diocese of Carlisle from 1990 to 1994; Team Rector of Daventry from 1994 to 1998, and then Llantwit Major from 1998 to 2003. Smalldon was a Canon Residentiary at Brecon Cathedral from 2003 to 2013.

On 21st November, 2026, Smalldon completed his groundhopping challenge by visiting his 200th football ground.
