= Derrick Childs =

British bishop

The Right Reverend Derrick Childs
- Archbishop of Wales
- Church: Church in Wales
- Appointed: 1983
- In office: 1983–1986
- Predecessor: Gwilym Williams
- Successor: George Noakes
- Previous post: Bishop of Monmouth (1970-1986)

Orders
- Consecration: 1970

Personal details
- Born: January 14, 1918
- Died: March 18, 1987 (aged 69)

Derrick Greenslade Childs (14 January 1918 – 18 March 1987) was the Anglican Bishop of Monmouth and Archbishop of Wales.

Childs grew up in Laugharne. He was educated at Whitland Grammar School, before reading history at University College, Cardiff. He studied theology at Salisbury Theological College, before being ordained in 1942. He was a curate in Milford Haven and then Laugharne. In 1947 he became editor of Cymry'r Groes, a magazine to serve the official youth organization of the Church of Wales. It was renamed Province in 1949; Childs remained its editor until 1967.

Childs married Cicely Davies in 1951; they were to have a son and a daughter. Also in 1951 Childs became Warden of Llandaff House, Penarth in 1951; this was a university hall of residence provided by the diocese. Four years later he became secretary of the provincial council for education and then, in 1956, secretary and treasurer of the Historical Society of the Church in Wales. In 1961 he left Llandaff House to become first director of the Church in Wales Publications. In 1965 he became chancellor of Llandaff Cathedral and then principal of Trinity College, Carmarthen. At that time church colleges were fighting for their survival; Childs had an important role in ensuring that Trinity College both survived and embarked on a period of imaginative development. In 1972, he was elected bishop of Monmouth and in 1983 became Primate of the Church in Wales. Childs was a sub-prelate of the Order of St John of Jerusalem.

Childs retired in 1986. He died shortly afterwards as the result of a motor accident.

Church in Wales titles
Preceded by Eryl Stephen Thomas	Bishop of Monmouth; 1970–1986	Succeeded by Royston Clifford Wright
Preceded by Gwilym Williams	Archbishop of Wales; 1983–1986	Succeeded by George Noakes
