= Ivor Rees (bishop) =

Welsh Anglican bishop (1926–2012)

John Ivor Rees (19 February 1926 – 11 January 2012) was a Welsh Anglican bishop. He was formerly the Bishop of St David's.

Rees was educated at Llanelli Grammar School and the University of Aberystwyth, after World War II service in the Royal Navy (Coastal Forces and the British Pacific Fleet) he was ordained in 1953. After curacies in Fishguard and Llangathen he became priest in charge of Uzmaston. Later he held incumbencies at Slebech, Llangollen and Wrexham before being appointed Dean of Bangor in 1976. In 1988 he became Archdeacon of St David's and an assistant bishop in the diocese. In 1991 he became the diocesan bishop, resigning his See effective 15 October 1995, due to reaching the retirement age. He was a Sub-Prelate of the Order of St John of Jerusalem from 1993 until 2002.
