= Thomas Davies (bishop) =

Welsh bishop

Thomas Davies (1511?–1573) was a Welsh clergyman, Bishop of St Asaph from 1561 to 1573.

== Early life ==
Davies was born about 1511, either at his father's house at Caerhun, in the parish of Llanbedr-y-Cennin, between Conwy and Llanrwst in Carnarvonshire, or, as some say, in Conwy town. His father, reputed to be a descendant of Sir Gruffudd Llwyd, was a country gentleman; his brothers filled posts as sheriff, coroner, and escheator of Carnarvonshire.

In 1535 the rectory of Llanbedr, together with the vicarage of Caerhun, was conferred on Davies, who must have been resident for the next few years at Cambridge. After a possible previous period at Oxford, he entered St John's College, Cambridge and afterwards Queens' College, Cambridge, where he proceeded LL.B. in 1543, and LL.D. in 1548. In 1546 he appears as holding the office of Chancellor of Bangor Cathedral, and in 1552 Arthur Bulkeley, Bishop of Bangor, left him some books in his will. He held various other livings, including one portion of the sinecure of Llandinam, and retained his preferments during the reigns of Edward VI and Mary I.

== Bishop ==
He was a sufficiently good Catholic to receive from Cardinal Pole the custody of the spiritualities of Bangor on the death of William Glyn in 1558; but he conformed on the accession of Elizabeth I, was made archdeacon of St Asaph, and was appointed bishop of the see on the translation of Bishop Richard Davies to St David's. He was consecrated at Croydon by Matthew Parker on 26 May 1561.

Even before his consecration his 'hasty proceedings' had excited the alarm of his predecessor. Perhaps it was in consequence of this that the temporalities of the see were not restored until 2 April 1562. They were worth £187 a year, and, following the precedent of Richard Davies, the new bishop retained his other preferments. This being done without legal warrant, complaints were made to the queen and council, but Parker took up Davies's cause, and the council accepted his view, and he was allowed to hold the rectories of Estyn and Crome in commendam. He possibly resigned to his kinsfolk some of his other livings, after having, it was said, made scandalous leases of the property that left little to his successors.

He was present in the convocation of 1563, and subscribed with the other bishops the Thirty-nine Articles. In December 1566 he joined the other bishops in signing a letter to the queen urging her to allow the bill enforcing subscription to the Articles which she had stayed in the House of Lords, to pass through parliament. In 1571 he subscribed by proxy the canons agreed upon in that year. He seems to have lived mostly in his diocese, and to have shown zeal for conformity. He drew up a series of directions to the clergy enjoining on them to keep residence and hospitality, to abolish relics and superstitions, to provide for the Welsh as well as the English, to enjoin the performance of the lawful ceremonies, to wear the proper vestments, to keep true registers, to provide themselves with books, and to use the stipends hitherto set apart for the 'lady priest' for parish schoolmasters. In 1570 he told William Cecil that he had reduced his see to much better order than that in which he found it; but as there was still some disorderly persons, he prayed for the institution of an ecclesiastical commission for his diocese.

== Death and legacy ==
He died on 16 October 1573, and was buried at Abergele, but no monument marks his remains. His will, dated 19 April 1570, included a legacy for the foundation of a scholarship at Queens' College, Cambridge, and bequests of £10 for Bangor school, for furniture for the Bishop of Bangor's house, and for the church in which he was buried.

== Family ==
His wife, Margaret, survived him, and acted as his executrix. His only daughter, Catherine, married William Holland, a gentleman of Abergele.
