= Barry Morgan (bishop) =

Welsh Anglican bishop (born 1947)

The Right Reverend Barry Morgan KStJ
- Archbishop of Wales
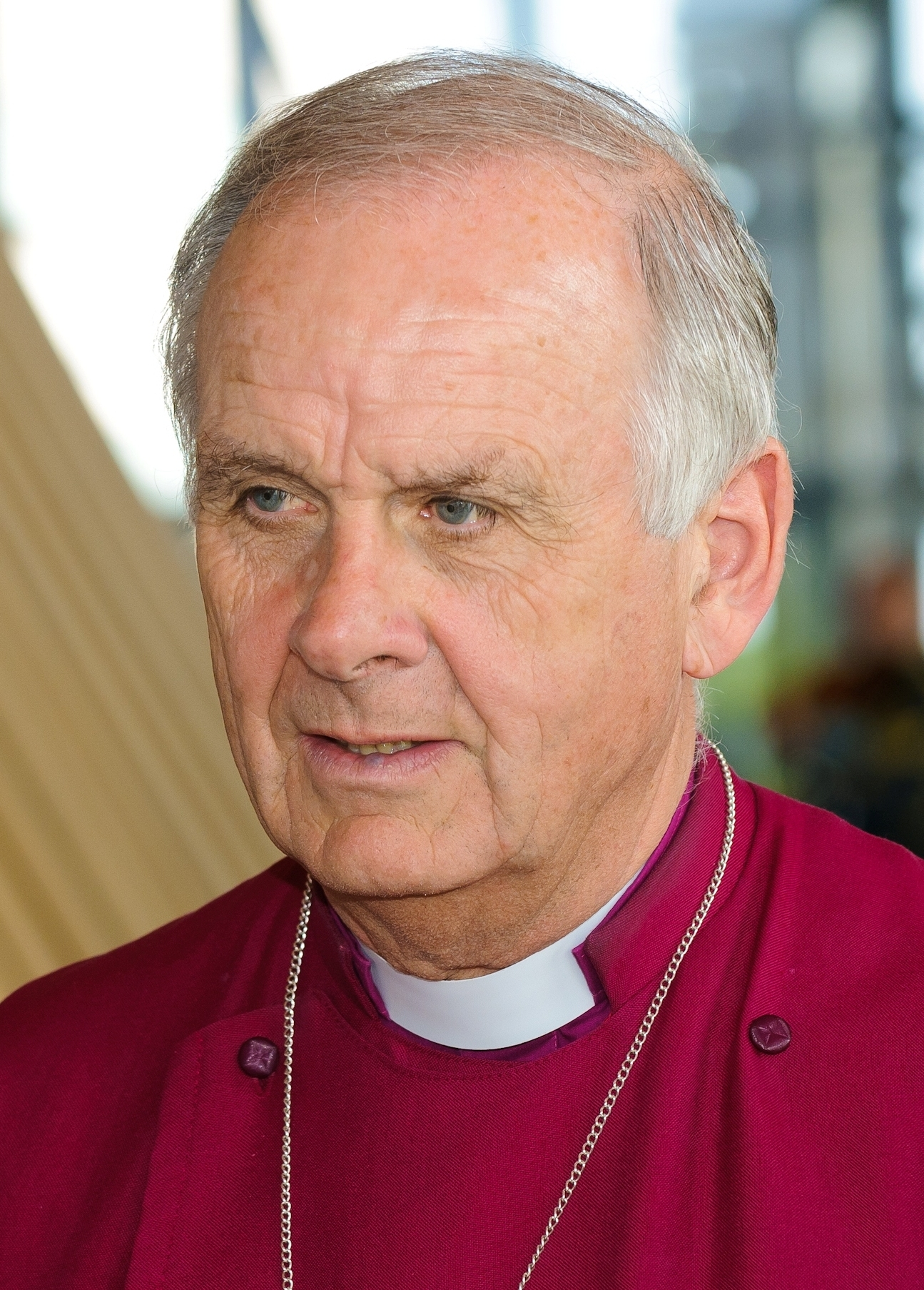
- Archbishop Morgan in 2011
- Church: Church in Wales
- In office: May 2003 to January 2017
- Predecessor: Rowan Williams
- Successor: John Davies
- Other posts: Bishop of Llandaff (1999–2017); Bishop of Bangor (1992–1999)

Orders
- Ordination: 1972 (deacon); 1973 (priest)
- Consecration: 9 January 1993

Personal details
- Born: Barry Cennydd Morgan; 31 January 1947 (age 79) Neath, Wales, United Kingdom
- Denomination: Anglicanism
- Education: University College London; Selwyn College, Cambridge; Westcott House, Cambridge; University of Wales

Barry Cennydd Morgan (born 31 January 1947) is a retired Welsh Anglican bishop from Neath, Wales who, from 2003 to Jan 2017, was Archbishop of Wales. He was both Primate and Metropolitan of the Church in Wales; Morgan was the Bishop of Bangor from 1992 to 1999, and was the Bishop of Llandaff from 1999 until his retirement in January 2017. He was the longest serving archbishop in the entire Anglican Communion, at the time of his retirement.

== Early life and education ==
Morgan was born on 31 January 1947 in Neath, Wales. He studied history at University College, London, and graduated with a Bachelor of Arts (BA) degree in 1969. In 1970, he entered Westcott House, Cambridge, an Anglican theological college in the Liberal Catholic tradition, to train for ordination. During this time, he also studied theology at Selwyn College, Cambridge, and graduated from the University of Cambridge with BA degree in 1972; as per tradition, his BA was promoted to a Master of Arts (MA Cantab) degree in 1974. He was awarded a Doctor of Philosophy (PhD) degree from the University of Wales in 1986.

== Ordained ministry ==
Morgan was ordained in the Church in Wales as a deacon in 1972 and as a priest in 1973. He was a curate in the parish of St Andrews Major with Michaelston-le-Pit in the Vale of Glamorgan. He then moved to become chaplain and lecturer at St Michael's College and the University of Wales in Cardiff. Subsequent appointments include warden of the Church Hostel Bangor; chaplain and lecturer in theology at the University of Wales Bangor; Director of Ordinands and in-service training advisor in the Diocese of Bangor; and Rector of Wrexham. From 1986 to 1993 he was Archdeacon of Merioneth.

In 1992 he was elected Bishop of Bangor; he was consecrated on 9 January 1993 at St Asaph Cathedral and then, in 1999 translated to become Bishop of Llandaff. He was elected in April 2003 to become Archbishop of Wales, remaining also Bishop of Llandaff; he took office upon the confirmation of his election in May 2003, and was ceremonially inaugurated on 12 July 2003 in Llandaff Cathedral.

In August 2016 Morgan announced he would retire as Archbishop of Wales and Bishop of Llandaff on 31 January 2017 to coincide with his 70th birthday as required by the Constitution of the Church in Wales.

== Other appointments ==
Morgan has served on the Central Committee of the World Council of Churches and served on the Primates Standing Committee of the Anglican Communion. He was a member of the Lambeth Commission which produced the Windsor Report 2004.

Morgan is currently Pro-Chancellor of the University of Wales, a fellow of University of Wales Institute, Cardiff and was until recently president of the Welsh Centre for International Affairs. He chaired an inquiry on behalf of Shelter Cymru on homelessness in Wales.

In 2013, Morgan was elected a Fellow of the Learned Society of Wales.

In 2017 Morgan was appointed Knight to the Order of St John (KStJ)

In July 2020, Morgan was appointed as a JAC Commissioner.

== Key debates ==
=== Trident ===
In September 2006, Morgan challenged the UK government's plans to renew the Trident nuclear missile system. According to the BBC, he expressed concern "about the government's apparent commitment to a long-term replacement for the Trident weapons system. With that kind of money we could prevent 16,000 children dying every day from diseases caused by impure water and malnutrition. The deaths of 16,000 children a day is the equivalent of 40 jumbo jets crashing every day of every week. Our world would not tolerate that - just look at what happens when our airports grind to a halt. But we do tolerate hunger, poverty and impure water, and are prepared to contemplate spending our resources on weapons of mass destruction." Morgan clarified that the view expressed were his own, and not those of the Church in Wales, however, the Church Governing body later supported his views, supporting the motion that "...the Governing Body deplore the decision of Her Majesty’s Government to consider the maintenance and renewal of the Trident nuclear weapons programme."

=== Fundamentalist atheism ===
In December 2007, Morgan blamed "fundamentalist atheism" for the phenomenon of de-Christianisation in public life claiming that Christmas was being called "Winterval", hospitals were removing Christian symbols from their chapels and schools were refusing to allow children to send Christmas cards.

=== Devolution ===
Morgan has argued strongly for increased transfers of responsibilities to the Welsh Assembly.

=== Immigration ===
He has expressed disquiet with the deportation of illegal immigrants (in one particular instance involving a Ghanaian cancer sufferer). At Christmas 2014 he asked the British government to accept more refugees from Syria.

=== Organ donation ===
Whilst strongly in favour of organ donation, he is against the Welsh Government's Bill on presumed consent where those who have not opted out will be deemed to have opted in for organ donation.

=== Ordination of women to the priesthood and episcopate ===
Morgan has strongly supported the ministry of women priests in a diocese hitherto strongly opposed to the development and has appointed women to be archdeacon of Llandaff, dean of Llandaff and vicar of the central Cardiff parish of St John the Baptist.

The Governing Body of the Church in Wales voted twice during Morgan's time as archbishop on the ordination of women to the episcopate, once in April 2008 (when the Governing Body voted in dissent), and again in 2013 (when it voted in assent). In 2016 a woman, the Revd Canon Joanna Penberthy, was elected by the Electoral College as the bishop of St David's.

== Published works ==
Morgan has written books on various subjects, including the poetry of R. S. Thomas.

- Strangely Orthodox: R. S. Thomas and His Poetry of Faith. Gomer Press. 2006. ISBN 978-1-84323-682-5.

== Personal life ==
Morgan was married to Hilary P Morgan of the Crown Prosecution Service, who died on 14 January 2016.

On the 15 March 2017 he was appointed a Knight of the Most Venerable Order of the Hospital of St John of Jerusalem.

Church in Wales titles
Preceded by Cledan Mears	Bishop of Bangor; 1992–1999	Succeeded by Saunders Davies
Preceded by Roy Davies	Bishop of Llandaff; 1999–2017	Succeeded by June Osborne
Preceded by Rowan Williams	Archbishop of Wales; 2003–2017	Succeeded by John Davies
Academic offices
Preceded by Dafydd Wigley	Pro-Chancellor of the University of Wales; 2006–present	Incumbent
