= Timothy Rees =

Bishop of Llandaff, Wales (1874–1939)

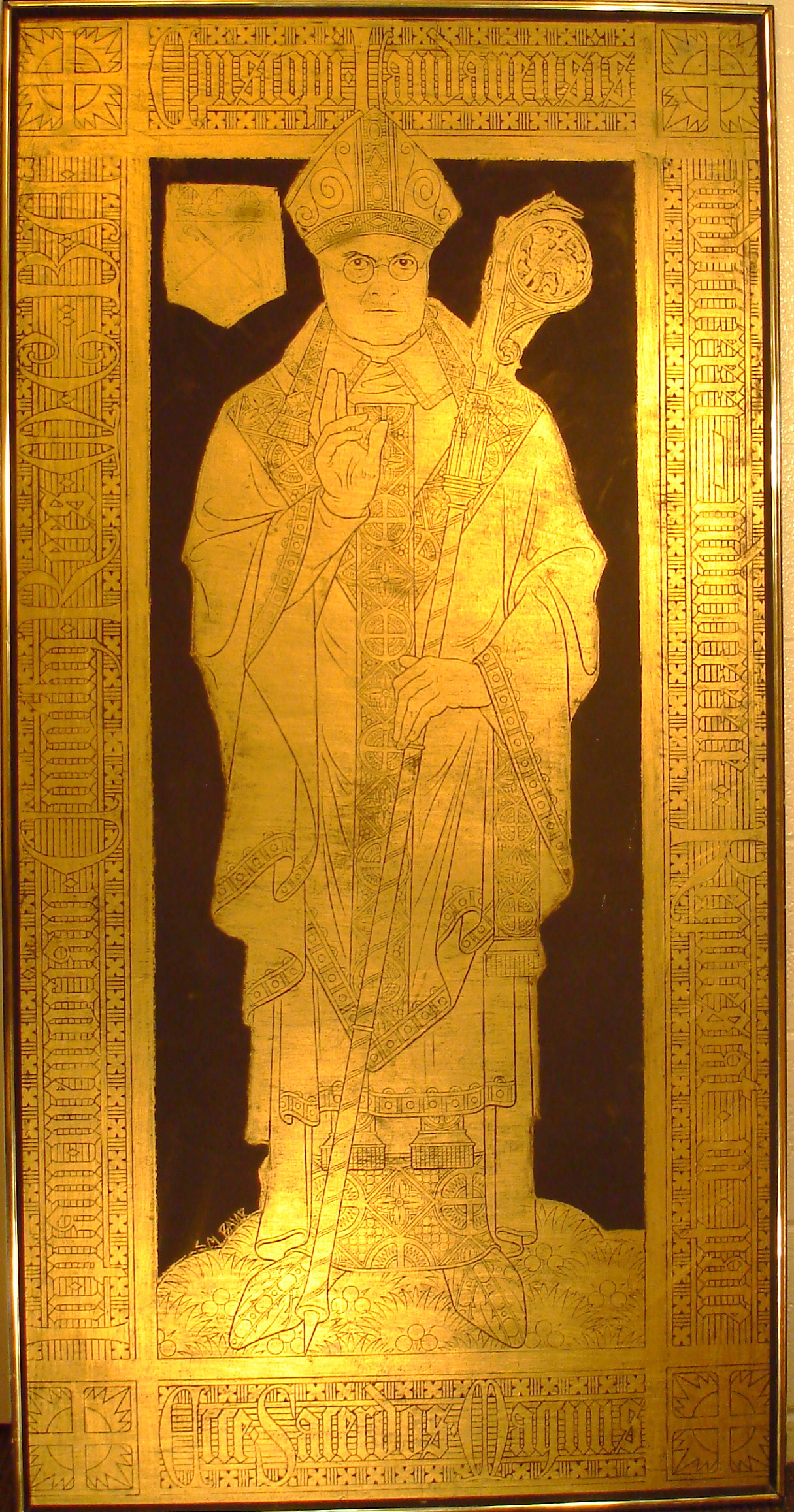
- Bishop Timothy Rees

Timothy Rees MC CR (15 August 1874 – 29 April 1939) was a Bishop of Llandaff.

Timothy Rees was a Cardiganshire man, educated at St David's College School and then St David's College Lampeter where he was as a member of the 16' Club. He subsequently pursued a monastic vocation at the Community of the Resurrection at Mirfield in Yorkshire. When in 1931 he became Bishop of Llandaff he was the first member of a religious community to be appointed to an Anglican see in Wales for over three centuries. He was a distinguished speaker both in English and Welsh and a respected hymnographer.

He was born to David Rees and his wife Catherine at Llain, Llanbadarn Trefeglwys, Ceridigion. The National Library of Wales, and others, report his birth as 15 August 1874, though some sources claim 1869.

== Education ==
He was educated at Ardwyn School, Aberystwyth, the College School, Lampeter, and St David's College. He graduated B.A. in 1896. After a year at St Michael's College, Aberdare, he was ordained deacon in December 1897, and priest a year later.

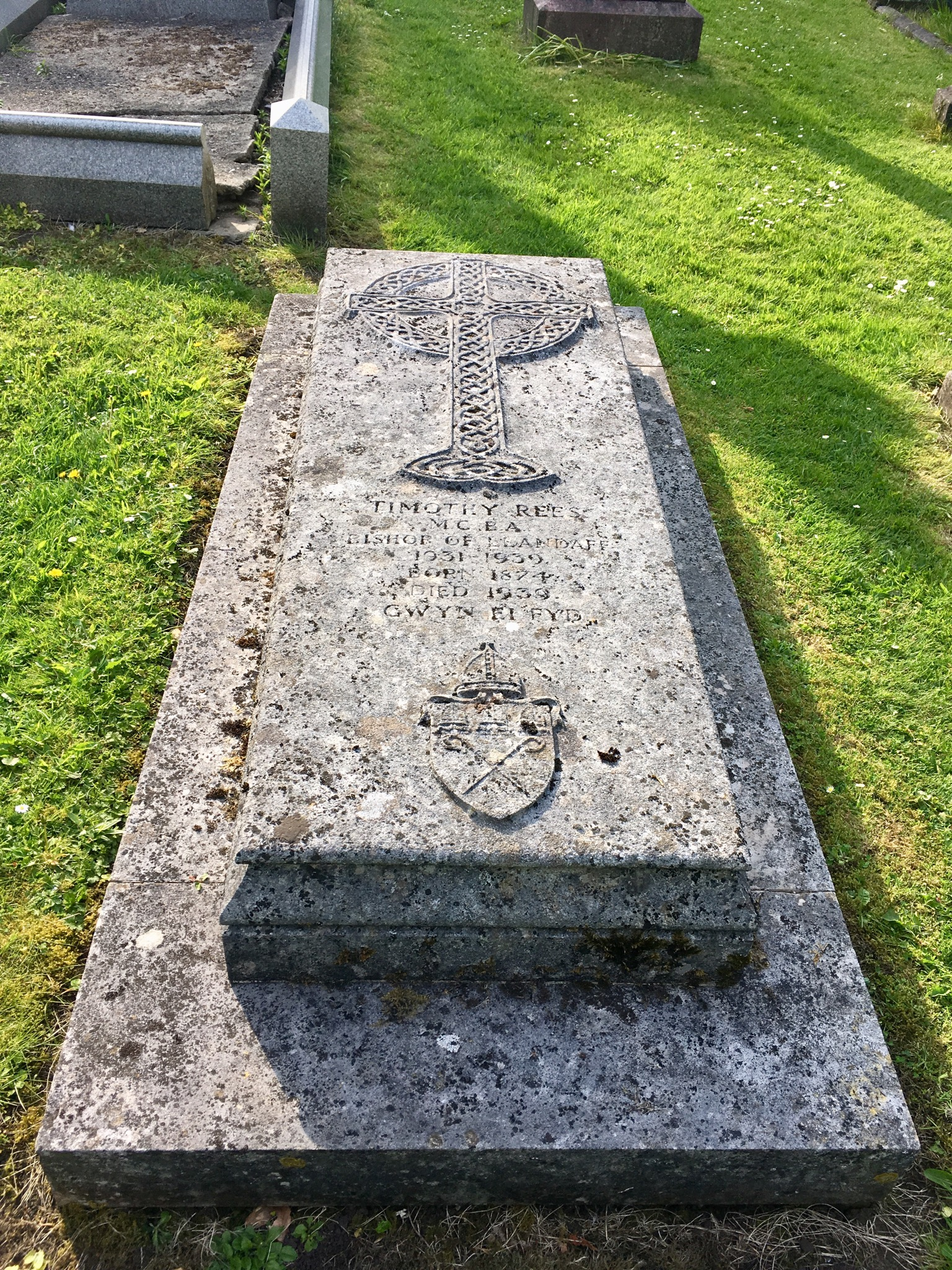
Rees's grave in the churchyard of Llandaff Cathedral, May 2020.

== Service ==
He served two years as curate at Mountain Ash, then returned to S. Michael's College as lecturer. In 1906 he joined the Community of the Resurrection at Mirfield, Yorks. He was principal of the theological college at Mirfield from 1922 to 1928. He served there until his appointment as Bishop of Llandaff in 1931. He became bishop at the most acute stage of the industrial depression; he was instantly faced with the problems caused by widespread unemployment in the mining communities. Although a prominent member of the Welsh establishment, he was definitely on the side of the working man. As president of the South Wales and Monmouthshire Council of Social Service, he took a leading role in the promotion of occupational clubs and other activities for the jobless. In 1935 he led a deputation to Whitehall to ask for government help in the rejuvenation of South Wales. Rees remained at Llandaff until his death on 29 April 1939. He was buried in the shadow of the cathedral; there is a floor brass to him in the Lady Chapel.

== Awards ==
He served as chaplain to the Forces for five years, from 1914 to 1919, working in Gallipoli, Egypt and on the Somme. He was awarded the M.C for his work in rescuing and aiding wounded soldiers on the Somme.

== Hymns ==
He was the author of several hymns including "Holy Spirit, ever living as the church's very life," "God is love, let heaven adore him," (set to the tune Twigworth by Herbert Howells in 1968 and also to the tune Hyfrydol) and "O crucified Redeemer". His "Hymn for the Saints of Wales" can be found in this discussion thread.

== Sources ==
- National Library of Wales: Dictionary of Welsh Biography
- Hymnology: 20th Century British Hymnody to 1950
- Pennant In the Parish of Dyffryn Arth: The People
- "God Is Love" score from James Webb

Church in Wales titles
Preceded by Joshua Pritchard Hughes	Bishop of Llandaff; 1931 –1939	Succeeded by John Morgan
