= John Lloyd (bishop of Swansea) =

The Right Reverend John Lloyd D.D.
- Born: October 21, 1847; Newport, Pembrokeshire, Wales
- Died: June 10, 1915 (aged 67); Oystermouth, Mumbles, Wales
- Education: Sidney Sussex College, Cambridge (BA, MA)
- Occupation: bishop
- Title: Bishop of Swansea

The Right Rev. John Lloyd, D.D. (21 October 1847 – 10 June 1915) was a British Anglican bishop. He served as the Bishop of Swansea (a suffragan bishop in the Diocese of St Davids) from 1890 until his death in office.

== Early life and education ==
Lloyd was born on 21 October 1847 in Newport, Pembrokeshire, the son of William Lloyd of Newport, Monmouthshire and Jane. He was educated at Haverfordwest and Cardigan and then attended Sidney Sussex College, Cambridge, receiving his Bachelor of Arts (BA) degree in 1876, his Cambridge Master of Arts (MA Cantab) in 1888, and a Doctorate of Divinity in 1891.

== Career ==
Made a deacon in London in 1876, he at first served as curate of Roehampton, Surrey; he was ordained priest in 1877 and became curate of Storrington, West Sussex.

He moved to Carmarthenshire and was vicar of Llanfihangel Aberbythych from 1877 to 1884, then became rector at Penboyr from 1884 to 1889. He served as vicar of St Peter's Church, Carmarthen from 1889 to 1890, then a canon residentiary of St Davids Cathedral from 1890 until 1907. He became rector of Jeffreyston with Reynalton, Pembrokeshire, in 1900 and then vicar of Lampeter, Cardiganshire, from 1903 to 1907. From 1907, he was the rector of Cantref, Breconshire.

Nominated to serve as the first Bishop of Swansea — to assist the Bishop of St Davids — Lloyd was ordained and consecrated a bishop on 24 June 1890, by Edward White Benson, Archbishop of Canterbury, at St Paul's Cathedral, and was sworn in on St Peter's Day (29 June) 1890.

== Personal life ==
He married Harriett-Susan Bishop, daughter of Charles Bishop of Dolgarreg, Carmarthenshire on 17 April 1883. He was survived by three daughters and one son, who was a lieutenant in the Army and godson of Lord Halsbury.

In 1890 and 1898, he lived at St. Peter's Vicarage in Carmarthen. In 1907, he lived at the Vicarage in Lampeter and the Canonry in St Davids. At the end of his life, he lived at Cantref Rectory in Brecon.

He was an angler and boatman.

== Death ==
He died on 9 June 1915 at Church Park in Oystermouth, Mumbles, after several months of ill health. His funeral was held at Mumbles Cemetery.

Church in Wales titles
New title	Bishop of Swansea; 1890–1915	Succeeded by Edward Bevan
