= Benjamin Vaughan (bishop) =

Anglican priest (1917–2003)

- Born: 25 December 1917
- Died: 5 August 2003 (aged 85)
- Occupation: Priest

Benjamin Noel Young Vaughan (25 December 1917 – 5 August 2003) was an Anglican priest.

He was born on Christmas Day 1917, the son of a Newport alderman, and took a first class degree in Classics at St David's University College, Lampeter. He then moved to St Edmund Hall, Oxford, where he achieved a second class degree in Theology, and Westcott House, Cambridge, where he trained for ordination.

Ordained in 1943, he served two curacies, in Llannon and Carmarthen, before going in 1948 to teach theology at Codrington College in Barbados, the main centre of Anglican theological training in the Caribbean. Several of his students went on to become bishops in the Church in the Province of the West Indies. After four years there, he returned to his alma mater at University of Wales, Lampeter to teach Old Testament and doctrine, from 1952 to 1955. He was Rector of Holy Trinity Cathedral, Port of Spain and Dean of Trinidad from 1955 to 1961; and Bishop Suffragan of Mandeville from 1961 to 1967. From 1967 until 1971 he served as Bishop of British Honduras (now the Anglican Diocese of Belize).

In 1971 he returned to Britain, and became dean of Bangor and assistant bishop in the Bangor diocese, giving assistance to the Archbishop of Wales, Gwilym Williams.

In 1976 Vaughan was elected Bishop of Swansea and Brecon, a post that he held until his retirement in 1987. Vaughan was affectionately referred to by his clergy as Beniamin Fychan (Welsh 'bychan' meaning small, in its mutated form 'fychan' from which the name Vaughan derives) in allusion to the Welsh of Psalm 68, v.27.

He died on 5 August 2003, aged 85.
