= John Davies (bishop of St Asaph) =

Bishop of St Asaph; Anglican bishop

John Stewart Davies (born 28 February 1943) was Bishop of St Asaph from 1999 until 2008.

Davies was educated at St. John's School, Leatherhead. After a career in Journalism, he read Hebrew at University College of North Wales (1968-1972); and at Queens' College, Cambridge (1972-1974), he wrote an MLitt thesis on ‘Form and Tradition of the Prophetic Call Narratives’ (awarded 1975). After study at Wescott House, he was ordained Deacon in 1974 (at Llanrhaeadr-yng-Nghinmeirch parish church) and ordained Priest in 1975 (at St Asaph Cathedral) by the Bishop of St Asaph, Harold John Charles. He began his service in the Church in Wales at Hawarden. He then held incumbencies at Rhosymedre and Mold, latterly as Archdeacon of St Asaph.

Church in Wales titles
Preceded by Alwyn Rice Jones	Bishop of St Asaph; 1999–2008	Succeeded by Gregory Cameron
