= Archbishop of Wales =

Anglican episcopal office in Wales

Archbishop of Wales Archesgob Cymru

anglican
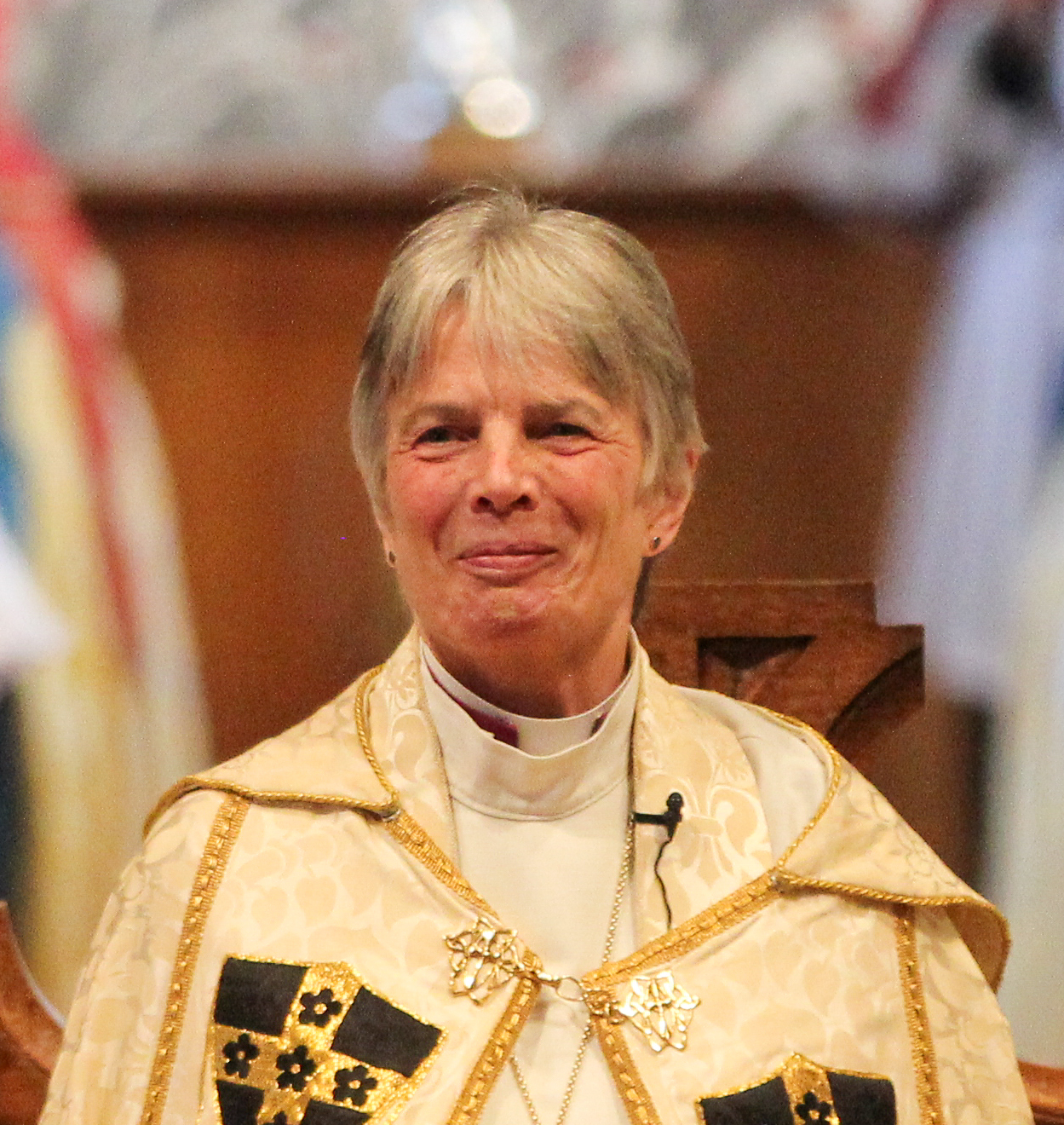
- Incumbent; Cherry Vann

Location
- Country: Wales
- Ecclesiastical province: Church in Wales

Statistics
- Area: 20,782 km^{2} (8,024 sq mi)

Information
- Established: 1920
- Patron saint: Saint David
- Language: Welsh and English

Map
- Map of the dioceses of Wales. Archbishops of Wales are chosen from among the Bench of Bishops. Their Diocesan See becomes the Archiepiscopal See upon their Enthronement.

Website
- www.churchinwales.org.uk/en/about-us/bishops/

The post of Archbishop of Wales (Welsh: Archesgob Cymru) was created in 1920 when the Church in Wales was separated from the Church of England and disestablished. The four historic Welsh dioceses had previously formed part of the Province of Canterbury, and so came under its Archbishop. The new Church became the Welsh province of the Anglican Communion.

Unlike the Archbishops of Canterbury and York, who are appointed by the King upon the advice of the Prime Minister, the Archbishop of Wales is one of the six diocesan bishops of Wales, elected to hold this office in addition to their own diocese.

With the establishment of the new province, there was debate as to whether a specific see should be made the primatial see, or if another solution should be adopted. Precedents were sought in the early history of Christianity in Wales, with St David's having a debatable pre-eminence among the sees. A Roman Catholic Archbishopric of Cardiff had been created in 1916. Instead, it was decided that one of the diocesan bishops should hold the title Archbishop of Wales in addition to their own see. The circulating character of the post was justified by Welsh geography and by the ecclesiastical precedent of the province of Numidia (of which St Augustine of Hippo had been a bishop). The archbishop is chosen in Llandrindod Wells, being a central point in the country. The first archbishop was chosen in the Old Parish Church in Llandrindod, but in more recent years, Holy Trinity Church has been used.

Successive archbishops have not only represented different geographical areas but also different tendencies within Anglicanism. In the mid-twentieth century linguistic issues were prominent in the successive incumbencies of Edwin Morris (who spoke no Welsh) and of Glyn Simon (who sympathised with advocates of the use of the Welsh language). Morris in some ways represented the broad churchmanship characteristic of the first occupant of the newly created post, A. G. Edwards, whereas Simon in many respects inherited the Anglo-Catholic outlook of the second archbishop, Charles Green (but without his authoritarianism). Towards the end of his period in office Gwilym Williams was one of three leading Welsh figures in a deputation to guarantee the status of the language which had been challenged by Margaret Thatcher. He was also decisive in the decision to ordain women priests. The former archbishop of Canterbury, Rowan Williams, subsequently Master of Magdalene College, Cambridge, was Archbishop of Wales and Bishop of Monmouth.

Williams was succeeded by Barry Morgan, who signed 'Barry Cambrensis'. Morgan oversaw the first consecration of a female bishop in the province, and was noted for his radicalism in other fields including same-sex marriage and his willingness to pronounce on political issues, including devolution, immigration, and organ donation. At the time of his retirement in 2017, he was the senior archbishop in the Anglican Communion by length of service.

The next archbishop was John Davies, who had been the senior bishop in the Church in Wales, and was elected on 6 September 2017 after acting as archbishop following Morgan's retirement. He was the first Bishop of Swansea and Brecon to hold the post of archbishop. He retired both as Bishop of Swansea and Brecon and as archbishop on 2 May 2021.

On 6 December 2021, Andy John, Bishop of Bangor, was elected to serve as Archbishop of Wales by an Electoral College of the Church in Wales meeting at Holy Trinity Church, Llandrindod Wells; his election was confirmed (and therefore he legally took up the archiepiscopal See) immediately. John announced his immediate retirement from the post on 27 June 2025.

Edwards, the first archbishop, Bishop of St Asaph, was supported in the diocese of St Asaph by the sole Bishop of Maenan; Glyn Simon and Barry Morgan were supported by Assistant Bishops of Llandaff. Andy John, Archbishop from 2021, appointed Mary Stallard to be Assistant Bishop of Bangor.

On 30 July 2025, Cherry Vann, Bishop of Monmouth, was officially appointed as Archbishop of Wales. She was the first woman to be elected as an Anglican archbishop in the United Kingdom and the first openly gay and partnered bishop to serve as a primate in the Anglican Communion. The choice of Vann was met with dismay from a variety of Christian groupings, including GAFCON, which called the election of Vann as “another painful nail in the coffin of Anglican orthodoxy” and Christian Concern, calling the appointment "tragic." Vann's appointment was welcomed by the Open Table Network as "a source of great joy and celebration".

== List of Archbishops of Wales ==
Archbishops of Wales
From	Until	Incumbent	Notes
1920	1934	Alfred George Edwards	Also Bishop of St Asaph from 1889.
1934	1944	Charles Green	Previously Bishop of Monmouth; also Bishop of Bangor from 1928; died in office.
1944	1949	David Prosser	Also Bishop of St Davids from 1926.
1949	1957	John Morgan	Previously Bishop of Swansea and Brecon; also Bishop of Llandaff from 1939; died in office.
1957	1967	Edwin Morris	Also Bishop of Monmouth from 1945.
1968	1971	Glyn Simon	Previously Bishop of Swansea and Brecon; also Bishop of Llandaff from 1957.
1971	1981	Gwilym Williams	Also Bishop of Bangor from 1957.
1983	1986	Derrick Childs	Also Bishop of Monmouth from 1970.
1986	1991	George Noakes	Also Bishop of St Davids from 1981.
1991	1999	Alwyn Rice Jones	Also Bishop of St Asaph from 1981.
2000	2002	Rowan Williams	Also Bishop of Monmouth from 1992; translated to Canterbury.
2002	2017	Barry Morgan	Previously Bishop of Bangor; also Bishop of Llandaff from 1999.
2017	2021	John Davies	Also Bishop of Swansea and Brecon since 2008.
2021	2025	Andy John	Bishop of Bangor since 2008
2025		Cherry Vann	Bishop of Monmouth since 2020; elected and confirmed July 2025.
