= John Morgan (archbishop of Wales) =

Welsh Anglican bishop (1886–1957)

The Most Reverend John Morgan
- Archbishop of Wales
- Church: Church in Wales
- Diocese: Diocese of Llandaff
- In office: 1949 to 1957
- Other posts: Bishop of Llandaff (1939–1957); Bishop of Swansea and Brecon (1934–1939)

Personal details
- Born: 6 June 1886
- Died: 26 June 1957 (aged 71)
- Denomination: Anglicanism
- Spouse: None

John Morgan (6 June 1886 – 26 June 1957) was a Welsh Anglican bishop. He served as Bishop of Swansea and Brecon (1934 to 1939), as Bishop of Llandaff (1939 to 1957), and then also as Archbishop of Wales (1949 to 1957).

== Early life and education ==
Morgan was born on 6 June 1886 in Llandudno, Wales. He spent some of his early education at The Cathedral School, Llandaff. He studied at Hertford College, Oxford, and trained for Holy Orders at Cuddesdon College, an Anglo-Catholic theological college near Oxford, England.

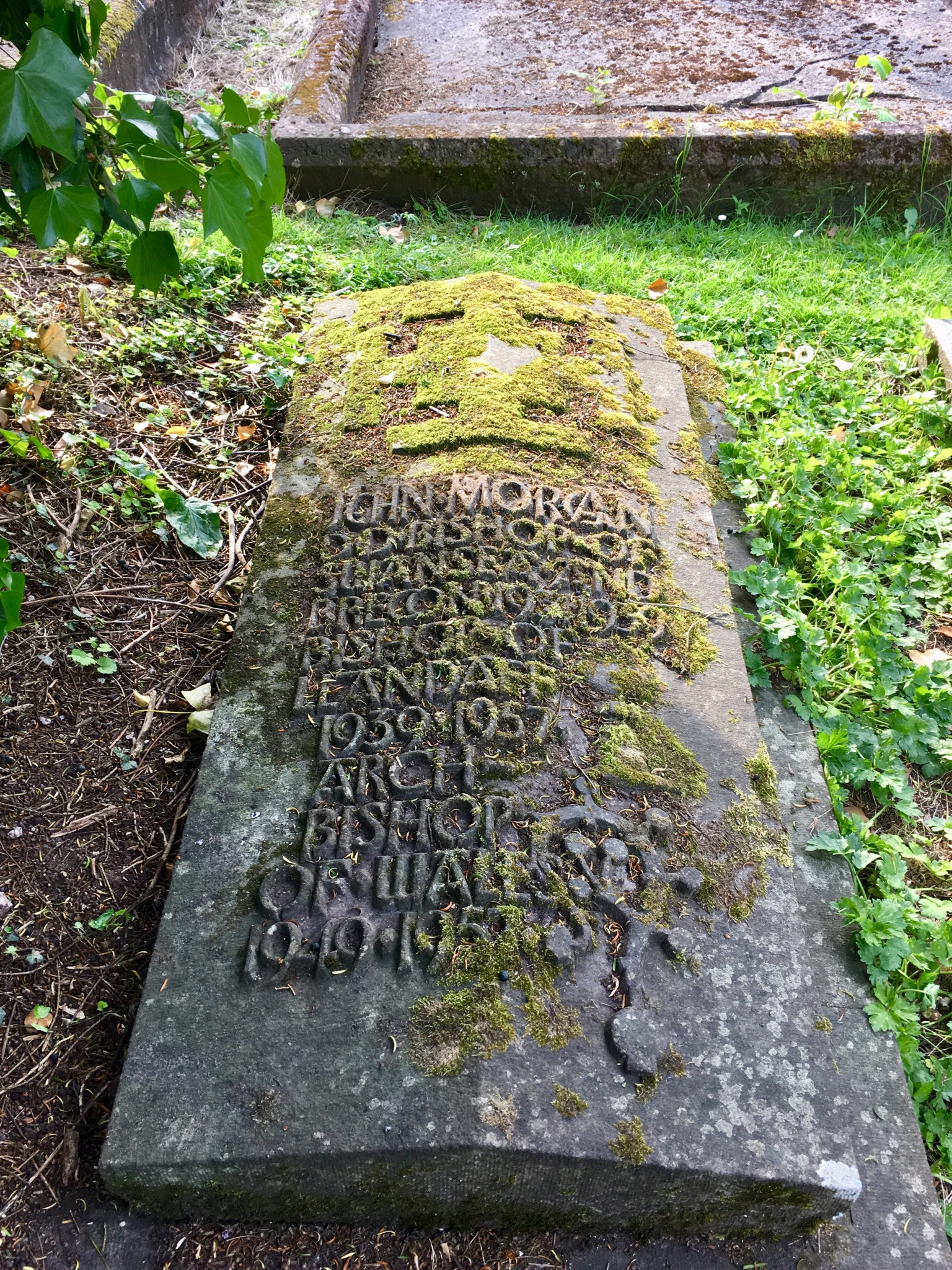
Morgan's grave in the churchyard of Llandaff Cathedral, May 2020

== Ordained ministry ==
Before being ordained as bishop he had been Vicar of Llanbeblig and Caernarfon. Firmly attached to the policies of Charles Green as Archbishop of Wales, he was a meticulous upholder of Anglo-Catholic principles. He witnessed the bombing of Llandaff Cathedral in January 1941 and presided over its earlier reconstruction, one of his last engagements being its rededication on 10 April 1957.

He was consecrated a bishop on 22 May 1934, by Alfred Edwards, Archbishop of Wales and Bishop of St Asaph, at St Asaph Cathedral. He then served as Bishop of Swansea and Brecon and ex-officio Dean of Brecon (1934–1939) and subsequently as Bishop of Llandaff (1939–1957), in which post he was also enthroned on 21 September 1949 as Archbishop of Wales (1949–1957).

== Personal life ==
Morgan was unmarried. He died on 26 June 1957.

Church in Wales titles
Preceded by Edward Bevan	Bishop of Swansea and Brecon; 1934–1939	Succeeded by Edward Williamson
Preceded by Timothy Rees	Bishop of Llandaff; 1939–1957	Succeeded by Glyn Simon
Preceded by David Prosser	Archbishop of Wales; 1949–1957	Succeeded by Edwin Morris
