= Thomas Bevan (priest) =

Archdeacon of St David's

Thomas Bevan (22 March 1800 – 28 December 1863) was Archdeacon of St David's from 1833 until his death.

Bevan was born at Gwenddwr and was educated at Jesus College, Oxford. He was made deacon in 1823 and ordained priest in 1824, both times by the Bishop of Winchester. He became Rector of St Peter, Carmarthen in 1833; the same year he was collated Archdeacon of St David's, and prebendary of Meidrim in that cathedral; he also became prebendary of Llanwrthwl in the Collegiate Church of Brecon, 1853. He died at Carmarthen, aged 63.
