= Bishop of Swansea and Brecon =

Diocesan bishop of the Church in Wales

Arms of the Diocese of Swansea & Brecon

The Bishop of Swansea and Brecon is the Ordinary of the Church in Wales Diocese of Swansea and Brecon.

The diocese covers the City and County of Swansea and the ancient counties of Brecknockshire and Radnorshire. The diocesan cathedral is the Cathedral Church of Saint John the Evangelist in the town of Brecon, which has been a parish church since the Reformation, becoming elevated to cathedral status in 1923. The diocese is administered from Brecon, with an additional office in Swansea.

The Bishop's residence is Ely Tower, Brecon. The office was created in 1923 at the founding of the diocese, an area stretching south to the coast of Gower and north into much of mid-Wales. Immediately prior to the diocese's erection, the first bishop, Edward Bevan, had served as Bishop of Swansea, a suffragan in the Diocese of St Davids.

It was announced on 4 November 2021 that John Lomas, Archdeacon of Wrexham had been appointed as the 10th Bishop of Swansea and Brecon. His election was confirmed at a Sacred Synod in Wrexham on 22 November 2021.

== List of the Bishops of the Diocese of Swansea and Brecon ==
Bishops of Swansea and Brecon
From	Until	Incumbent	Notes
1923	1934	Edward Bevan	Previously suffragan/assistant Bishop of Swansea (Diocese of St Davids)
1934	1939	John Morgan	subsequently Bishop of Llandaff (1939-1957) and Archbishop of Wales (1949-1957)
1939	1953	Edward Williamson	
1953	1957	Glyn Simon	subsequently Bishop of Llandaff (1957-1971) and Archbishop of Wales (1968-1971)
1958	1976	Jack Thomas	
1976	1988	Benjamin Vaughan	
1988	1998	Dewi Bridges	
1999	2008	Anthony Pierce	
2008	2021	John Davies	Archbishop of Wales from September 2017 until his retirement
2021	present	John Lomas	since 22 November 2021

== Sources ==
- Whitaker's Almanack to 2004, Joseph Whitaker and Sons Ltd/A&C Black, London
