= David Prosser (bishop) =

British bishop (1868–1950)

David Lewis Prosser (10 June 1868 – 28 February 1950) was a Welsh Anglican bishop and Archbishop of Wales from 1944 to 1949.

== Life ==
Prosser was born in Llangynnor on 10 June 1868. He was educated at Llandovery College in Llandovery, Carmarthenshire, west Wales, before entering Keble College, Oxford, with a history scholarship. He obtained a third-class degree in modern history in 1891 and was then ordained deacon in 1892 and priest in 1893. He served as assistant curate of Holy Trinity, Aberystwyth (1892–96) and Christ Church, Swansea (1896–1909) before being appointed vicar of Pembroke Dock in 1909. He was additionally appointed Archdeacon of St David's in 1920. In 1927, he was consecrated as Bishop of St David's, a post he held until his death on 28 February 1950 aged 81. He was also Archbishop of Wales from 1944 to 1949. He was appointed an Honorary Fellow of Keble College in 1949.

== Views on Ecumenism ==
Prosser believed strongly that the Anglican Church in Wales was the true Catholic Church in Wales and that both the Roman Catholic and Nonconformist Churches were no more than "Intruders", as evidenced by his statement in 1946 (which he repeated in May 1949):

"The Roman clergy and Noncomformist ministers are intruders… There may be historical excuse for their being here, but we cannot recognise their right to be here…"

Preceded by John Owen	Bishop of St David's; 1926–1950	Succeeded by William Havard
Preceded by Charles Green	Archbishop of Wales; 1944–1949	Succeeded by John Morgan
