= Edward Vaughan =

Edward Vaughan may refer to:

- Edward Vaughan (Welsh priest), archdeacon of Cardigan, 1560–1563
- Edward Vaughan (bishop) (died 1522), Welsh bishop of St David's
- Edward Vaughan (of Llwydiarth) (died 1661), Welsh MP for Merioneth and Montgomeryshire
- Edward Vaughan (died 1683), Welsh lawyer and politician
- Edward Vaughan (died 1718), Welsh MP for Merionethshire, 1679–1718
- Edward Vaughan (archdeacon of Madras) (1776–1849), Anglican priest in India
