= William Owen =

William, Bill, Will or Billy Owen may refer to:

== Law ==
- Sir William Owen (judge, born 1834) (1834–1912), justice of the Supreme Court of New South Wales
- Sir William Owen (judge, born 1899) (1899–1972), justice of the High Court of Australia, grandson of the above

== Military ==
- William Owen (Royal Navy officer, born 1737) (1737–1778), British Royal Navy officer and settler of Campobello Island, Canada
- William Fitzwilliam Owen (1774–1857), British Royal Navy vice-admiral and explorer
- William T. Owen (1905–1942), Australian Army officer killed in action during World War II

== Politics ==
- William Owen (Oxford MP) (c. 1540–1580), MP for Oxford
- Sir William Owen (Shrewsbury MP), MP for Shrewsbury, 1625–1628
- Sir William Owen, 4th Baronet (c. 1697–1781), British Member of Parliament for Pembroke and Pembrokeshire
- William Mostyn Owen (1742–1795), British landowner and politician
- William L. Owen (1809–1881), planter, businessman, and politician from Virginia
- William Owen (Australian politician) (1815–1869), businessman and politician in South Australia, prominent Total Abstainer
- William Owen (Wisconsin politician, born 1825) (1825–1894), member of the Wisconsin State Assembly
- William Owen (trade unionist) (1844–1912), English trade unionist, journalist and political activist
- William D. Owen (1846–disappeared 1906), United States representative from Indiana
- William Reid Owen (1864–1949), mayor of Vancouver, British Columbia, 1924
- William E. Owen (1888–1976), member of the Wisconsin State Senate and Wisconsin State Assembly
- Will Owen (politician) (1901–1981), British politician
- Bill Owen (Tennessee politician) (born 1947), American politician, member of the Tennessee House of Representatives and Tennessee Senate
- Bill Owen (Missouri politician), American politician, member of the Missouri House of Representatives

== Sports ==
- Digby Owen (William Digby Owen, 1857–1901), Oswestry F.C. and Wales international footballer
- William O. Owen (1859–1947), who climbed the true summit of Grand Teton in 1898
- William Pierce Owen (1860–1937), Ruthin Town F.C. and Wales international footballer
- William Owen (footballer, born 1862) (1862–?), Chirk F.C. and Wales international footballer
- Billy Owen (1872–1906), English footballer
- William Owen (footballer, born 1884) (1884–1945), footballer who played for Stoke
- Bill Owen (baseball), head baseball coach at the University of Oklahoma, 1923–1926
- Bill Owen (American football) (1903–1975), American football player
- William Owen (footballer, born 1906) (1906–?), English football goalkeeper with Birmingham, Fulham and Coventry City
- Bill Owen (footballer) (1914–1976), Welsh footballer
- Bill Owen (rugby league) (1936–1996), Australian rugby league player
- Will Owen (cricketer) (born 1988), Welsh cricketer
- Will Owen (racing driver) (born 1995), American racing driver
- Will Owen (rugby union) (born 1995), English rugby union player

== Others ==
- William Owen (priest) (died 1680), Welsh Anglican priest
- William Owen Pughe (born William Owen, 1759–1835), Welsh antiquary
- William Owen (painter) (1769–1825), British portrait painter
- William Owen (architect, born 1791) (1791–1879), Welsh architect
- William George Owen (1810–1885), British civil engineer
- William Owen (composer) (1814–1893), Welsh composer of hymn tunes
- William Lancaster Owen (1843–1911), British civil engineer
- William Owen (architect, born 1846) (1846–1910), English architect
- William C. Owen (1854–1929), British–American anarchist, writer during the Mexican Revolution
- Will Owen (illustrator) (1869–1957), English book illustrator, cartoonist, caricaturist and artist
- William David Owen (1874–1925), Welsh novelist
- Bill Owen (actor) (1914–1999), English actor and songwriter
- Bill Owen (announcer) (born 1931), American writer and radio and television announcer
- Bill Owen, fictional character in The Old Man in the Corner stories by Baroness Orczy

== See also ==
- William Owens (disambiguation)
