= James Protheroe =

British priest

James Havard Protheroe (10 May 1839 – 3 February 1903) was the Archdeacon of Cardigan from 1893 until his death in 1903.

Protheroe was the son of Thomas Protheroe, of Carmarthen, and was a Mawson Scholar of Corpus Christi College, Cambridge, where he graduated in 1864. He was admitted deacon in 1865, and priest in 1866, and was Curate of St John’s, Cardiff, from 1865 to 1869, when he became Chaplain of HM Gaol, Cardiff serving there until 1872. He was Vicar of Mountain Ash, Glamorganshire, 1872–1884, then Rector of Llanblethian with Cowbridge and Welsh St Donats 1884–1886.

In 1886 he was transferred to Vicar of Aberystwyth, and in 1893 was appointed Archdeacon of Cardigan, an administrative division of the Church in the Wales Diocese of St Davids. As such he was also Prebendary of Llandyfriog in St Davids Cathedral.

Protheroe married in 1873 Catherine Howell, elder daughter of Very Rev. David Howell, Dean of St David’s. They had three sons and three daughters, including Arthur Protheroe, Margaret Protheroe and Nancy Protheroe.

He died at Aberystwyth on 3 February 1903.

Church in Wales titles
Preceded by William North	Archdeacon of Cardigan; 1893–1903	Succeeded by David Williams
