= List of Archdeacons of Cardigan =

This is a list of archdeacons of Cardigan. The Archdeacon of Cardigan is the priest in charge of the archdeaconry of Cardigan, an administrative division of the Church in Wales Diocese of St Davids. The archdeaconry comprises the five deaneries of Cemaes/sub-Aeron, Emlyn, Glyn Aeron, Lampeter/Ultra-Aeron and Llanbadarn Fawr.

- Cydifor
- ?–1148 David fitzGerald (afterwards Bishop of St David's, 1148)
- 1487-? Thomas ap Hywel
- ?-1542 John Luntley
- ?-1547 Hugh Matthew
- John Butler held it in 1551 and 1562.
- Edward Talley
- Edward Vaughan 1560–1563
- 1563 Peregrine Davids
- 1569-1584 Lewis Gwynn
- 1592–1629 Richard Middleton
- 1629-1654 Thomas Brand
- 1660–1668 Edward Vaughan
- 1668–1681 William Owen
- 1681–? John Williams
- 1701-1714 John Shore
- 1714-1721 Owen Evans
- 1721-1727 John Parry
- 1727-1739 Edward Welchman
- 1739-1769 Edward Yardley
- 1770-1798 Thomas Vincent
- 1798-1814 John Williams
- 1814-1833 Thomas Beynon (Archdeacon of Cardigan)
- 1833-?1858 John Williams (died 1858)
- 1859-?1860 John Hughes (died 1860)
- 1860-?1893 William North
- 1893–1903 James Protheroe
- 1903–1928 David Williams
- 1928–1936 David Williams
- 1936–1944 David Thomas
- 1944–1951 Aldred Williams
- 1951–1962 Richard Ward
- 1962–1967 Owen Jenkins (afterwards Archdeacon of Carmarthen, 1967)
- 1967–1979 Eifion Evans
- 1979-1982 George Noakes (afterwards Bishop of St David's, 1982)
- 1982-1986 Sam Jones
- 1986–1990 Bertie Lewis (afterwards Dean of St David's, 1990)
- 1990-2006 Hywel Jones
- 2006-2008 Andy John (afterwards Bishop of Bangor, 2008)
- 2008–2019 William Strange
- 20 June 2019 – present Eileen Davies

Rachel Hannah Eileen Davies (called Eileen; born 1964) was collated Archdeacon of Cardigan on 20 June 2019. She trained for the ministry at St Michael's College, Llandaff before serving her title (curacy) at the Lampeter and Llanddewibrefi (later called Bro Teifi Sarn Helen) group of parishes; she was made deacon at Petertide 2004 (26 June) and ordained priest the following Petertide (25 June 2005) — both times by Carl Cooper, Bishop of St Davids, at St Davids Cathedral. Davies moved in 2008 to become Priest-in-Charge of Llanerch Aeron et cetera; remaining at Llanerchaeron, she additionally became first an honorary canon (in 2012) and then a canon (in 2014) of the cathedral.

== Sources ==
- Jones, B., ed. (1965), Fasti Ecclesiae Anglicanae 1300–1541, vol. 11, pp. 62–63
- Hardy, Thomas Duffus, ed. (1854), Fasti Ecclesiae Anglicanae 1066–1854, 1, pp. 313, 314, 315
