= John Hughes (disambiguation) =

John Hughes (1950–2009) was an American film director, writer, and producer.

John Hughes may also refer to:

== Arts and entertainment ==
=== Literature ===
- John Hughes (poet) (1677–1720), English poet
- John Hughes (1790–1857), English author
- John Ceiriog Hughes (1832–1887), Welsh poet
- John Hughes (writer) (born 1961), Australian author and essayist

=== Performing arts ===
- John Hughes (1872–1914), Welsh composer of Calon Lân and other hymn-tunes
- John Hughes (1873–1932), Welsh composer of Cwm Rhondda and other hymn-tunes
- John Hughes (Irish musician) (born 1950), Irish musician and manager of The Corrs
- John Hughes III (born 1976), American musician and founder of Hefty Records
- John Patrick Hughes, co-founder of Rhythm and Hues Studios
- Father John Hughes, character in British TV series Peaky Blinders

=== Visual arts ===
- John Hughes (sculptor) (1865–1941), Irish sculptor
- John Hughes (art director) (1882–1954), American art director
- John Hughes (architect) (1903–1977), British architect
- John Hughes (ceramicist) (1935–2013), Welsh ceramicist

== Business and industry ==
- John Hughes (businessman) (1814–1889), Welsh developer in Ukraine
- John Hughes (merchant) (1825–1885), father of John Hughes (New South Wales politician)
- John Hughes (motor dealer) (born 1935), Australian businessman

== Law and politics ==
- John Hughes (Middlesex MP) (fl. 1542–1552), English Member of Parliament for Middlesex
- John Hughes (Pennsylvania politician) (1711–1772), colonial Pennsylvania politician
- John Bristow Hughes (1817–1881), grazier, developer and politician in the early days of the Colony of South Australia
- John Hughes (New South Wales politician) (1857–1912), Australian politician
- John T. Hughes (politician) (1873–1921), American politician from Arizona, member of the 1st Arizona state legislature
- John Chambers Hughes (1891–1971), United States diplomat; ambassador to NATO
- John H. Hughes (politician) (1904–1972), New York state senator
- John Hughes (Coventry North East MP) (1925–2009), MP for Coventry North East
- John T. Hughes (intelligence officer) (1928–1992), U.S. Defense Intelligence Agency officer
- John Owen Hughes (1881–1945), British businessman and politician in Hong Kong
- John Hughes (British diplomat) (born 1947), British diplomat and Ambassador to Argentina
- John Hughes (South Dakota politician), American politician

== Military ==
- John T. Hughes (Confederate officer) (1817–1862), colonel in the Missouri State Guard and Confederate Army
- John Gethin Hughes (1866–1954), New Zealand law clerk and military leader
- John H. Hughes (general) (1876–1953), U.S. Army major general
- John Arthur Hughes (1880–1955), American Medal of Honor recipient

== Religion ==
- John Hughes (priest, 1787–1860), Welsh clergyman
- John Hughes (archbishop) (1797–1864), American Roman Catholic prelate
- John Wesley Hughes (1852–1932), American minister and founder of Kingswood College
- John Hughes (bishop of Croydon) (1908–2001), English Anglican bishop
- John Poole-Hughes (1916–1988), Bishop of South-West Tanganyika and Bishop of Llandaff
- John Hughes (priest) (1924–2008), British Anglican priest
- John Hughes (bishop of Kensington) (1935–1994), British Anglican bishop
- John Hughes (theologian) (1979–2014), British scholar and Dean of Chapel and Chaplain at Jesus College, Cambridge

== Science and medicine ==
- John Hughes (neuroscientist) (born 1942), British neuroscientist
- John Hughes (computer scientist) (born 1958), Swedish computer scientist
- John F. Hughes, American computer scientist

== Sports ==
=== Association football (soccer) ===
- John Hughes (footballer, born 1852), Aston Villa footballer and co-founder
- John Hughes (footballer, born 1855) (1855–1914), Cambridge University A.F.C. and Wales international footballer
- John Hughes (footballer, born 1877) (1877–1950), Welsh international footballer, played for Liverpool
- John Iorwerth Hughes (1913–1993), Welsh international footballer
- John Hughes (footballer, born 1921) (1921–2003), English footballer, played for Birmingham City
- John Hughes (footballer, born 1942), Welsh footballer, played for Chester City
- John Hughes (footballer, born 1943) (1943–2022), Scottish footballer, played for Celtic
- John Hughes (footballer, born 1962), English footballer, see List of Bury F.C. players (1–24 appearances)
- John Hughes (footballer, born 1964), Scottish footballer and manager, played for Falkirk
- John Hughes (soccer, born 1965), Canadian soccer player

=== Other sports ===
- John Hughes (cricketer, born 1825) (1825–1907), English cricketer
- John Hughes (ice hockey, born 1954) (1954–2020), Canadian ice hockey player
- John Hughes (cricketer, born 1971), English cricketer
- John Hughes (ice hockey, born 1988), Canadian ice hockey player
- John Hughes (American football) (born 1988), American football player

== Others ==
- John Hughes (lawman) (1855–1947), Texas Ranger and cowboy of the Old West
- John Hughes (editor) (1930–2022), Welsh-American journalist; editor of the Deseret News
- John Hughes (counselor) (1945–2012), American pioneer in alcohol- and drug-prevention
- John G. Hughes (born 1953), Irish academic administrator

== Other uses ==
- John Hughes, Antigua and Barbuda, a town in Saint Mary Parish, Antigua and Barbuda

== See also ==
- Jonathan Hughes (disambiguation)
- Jack Hughes (disambiguation)
- Hughes (surname)
