= Instow =

Village in North Devon, England

Coordinates: 51°03′N 4°10′W

- Village and civil parish
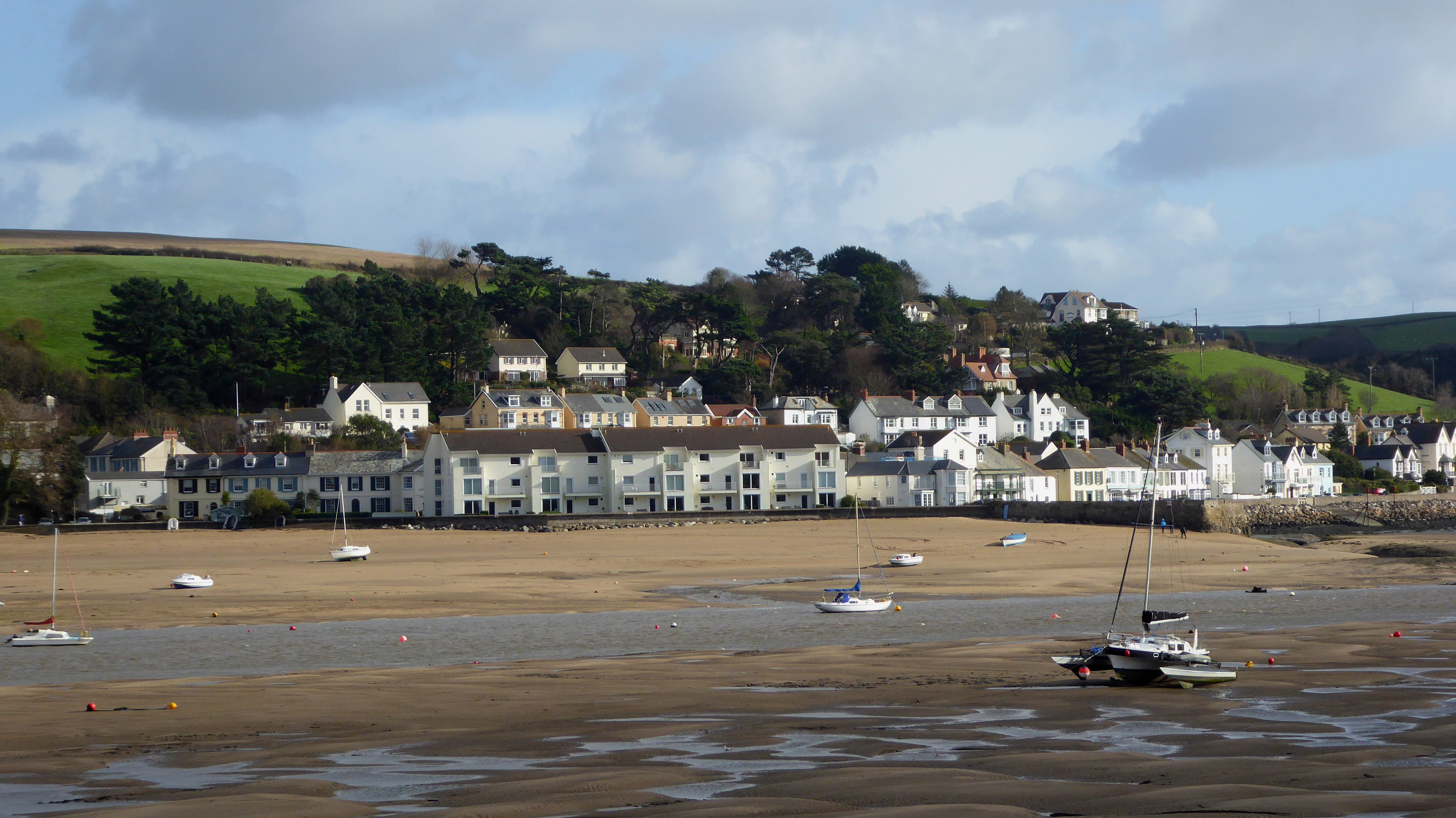
- The centre of Instow, as seen from Appledore

- Location within Devon
- Population: 706 (2011 Census)
- OS grid reference: SS472302
  - London: 218 mi (351 km)
- Civil parish: Instow
- District: North Devon
- Shire county: Devon
- Region: South West
- Country: England
- Sovereign state: United Kingdom
- Post town: BIDEFORD
- Postcode district: EX39
- Police: Devon and Cornwall
- Fire: Devon and Somerset
- Ambulance: South Western
- UK Parliament: North Devon

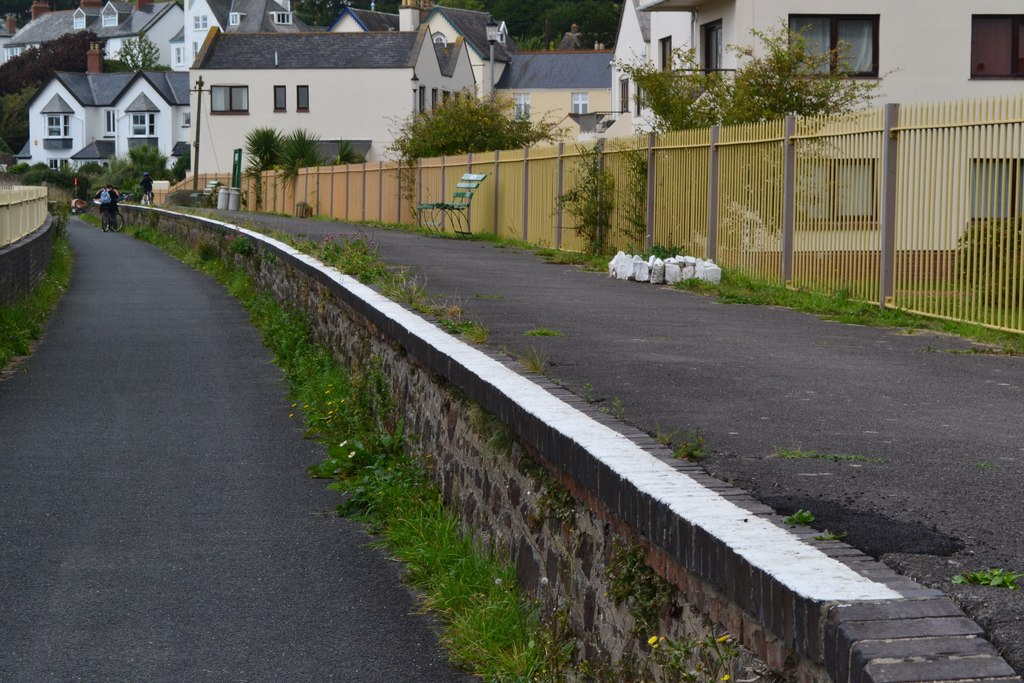
Instow railway station in 2018

Instow is a village in north Devon, England. It is on the estuary where the rivers Taw and Torridge meet, between the villages of Westleigh and Yelland and on the opposite bank to Appledore. There is an electoral ward with the same name. The ward's total population at the 2011 census was 1,501.

There is a small river beach and sand dunes, that home some rare species of orchid including the pyramidal orchid.

The Tarka Trail passes through Instow, providing an easy means for people to arrive on foot or by bike. This section of the Trail is also part of the South West Coast Path, offering longer walks along the coast.

The village is served by the Church of St John the Baptist, which has 13th- or 14th-century origins and is a Grade I listed building. A chapel of ease, All Saints, was built in 1936 and is now also used as a community centre.

== History ==
Instow is mentioned in the Domesday Book as having two ploughlands and 66 acres (27 ha) of meadow, pasture and woodland. The name of Instow derives from Anglo-Saxon of St John's Holy Place, which would have been Johnstow, or Jonestow. The suffix Stow, denotes a holy place in the Anglo-Saxon language, and the name is found in many places across Devon which had a church (Churchstow, Christow, Virginstow). The original settlement was on the high ground opposite the more modern site of the village low against the riverside. This is where the 14th century Church of St John the Baptist is located, near to the Instow Community Primary School.

The parish was formerly in the hundred of Fremington, some 3 miles (4.8 km) north-east of Bideford, and 6 miles (9.7 km) west of Barnstaple. In 1889, a directory described the village as being 218 miles (351 km) from London, and on "the high road from Bideford to Barnstaple."

Before the arrival of the railway in 1855, the village was quite small consisting of two sets of cottages, one by Lane End, and the other set next to the quay. The quay was built c. 1620, and is a Grade II listed structure. The village hall, which was built in 1911, was formerly known as Rifle Hall, as it was used to train soldiers on rifle drills for the First World War. Military training in the Second World War included practise D-Day landings with walls built into the dunes near to Instow. These were removed quite quickly after the war had ended.

== Instow Railway Station ==
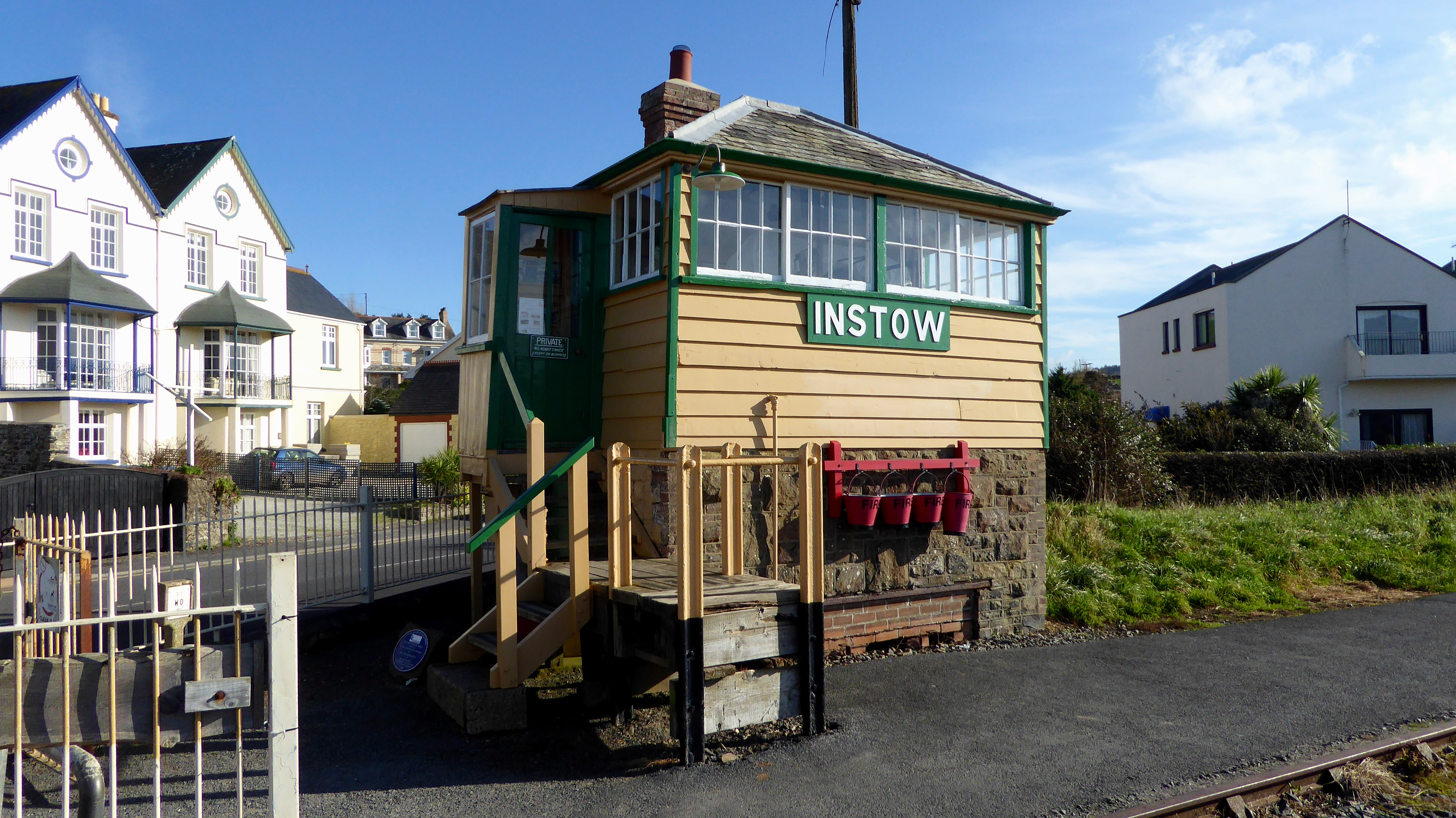
Instow Signal Box

The line opened from Barnstaple to Fremington in 1848, and then passenger trains ran from Barnstaple to Bideford from 2 November 1855 after the Bideford Extension Railway reached Torrington and a station was built at Instow. The line was further extended to Torrington in 1872. Passenger services ceased on 2 October 1965 although ball clay traffic continued until 1982.

Instow has a famous railway signal box, which is over 130 years old and was the UK's first Grade II listed signal box. It used to control the signals at Instow Station and also the operation of the level crossing. You can see the wheel that operated the gates, pull the signal levers, one of which still operates a signal, and generally learn how the box worked. In 2003 the box was nationally recognised for its restoration and educational value by receiving the Carillion Rail Award at the National Railway Heritage Awards. The signal box is now managed and run by volunteers of the Bideford Railway Heritage Centre and is open to the public on occasional Sundays and Bank Holidays.

== Instow Beach ==
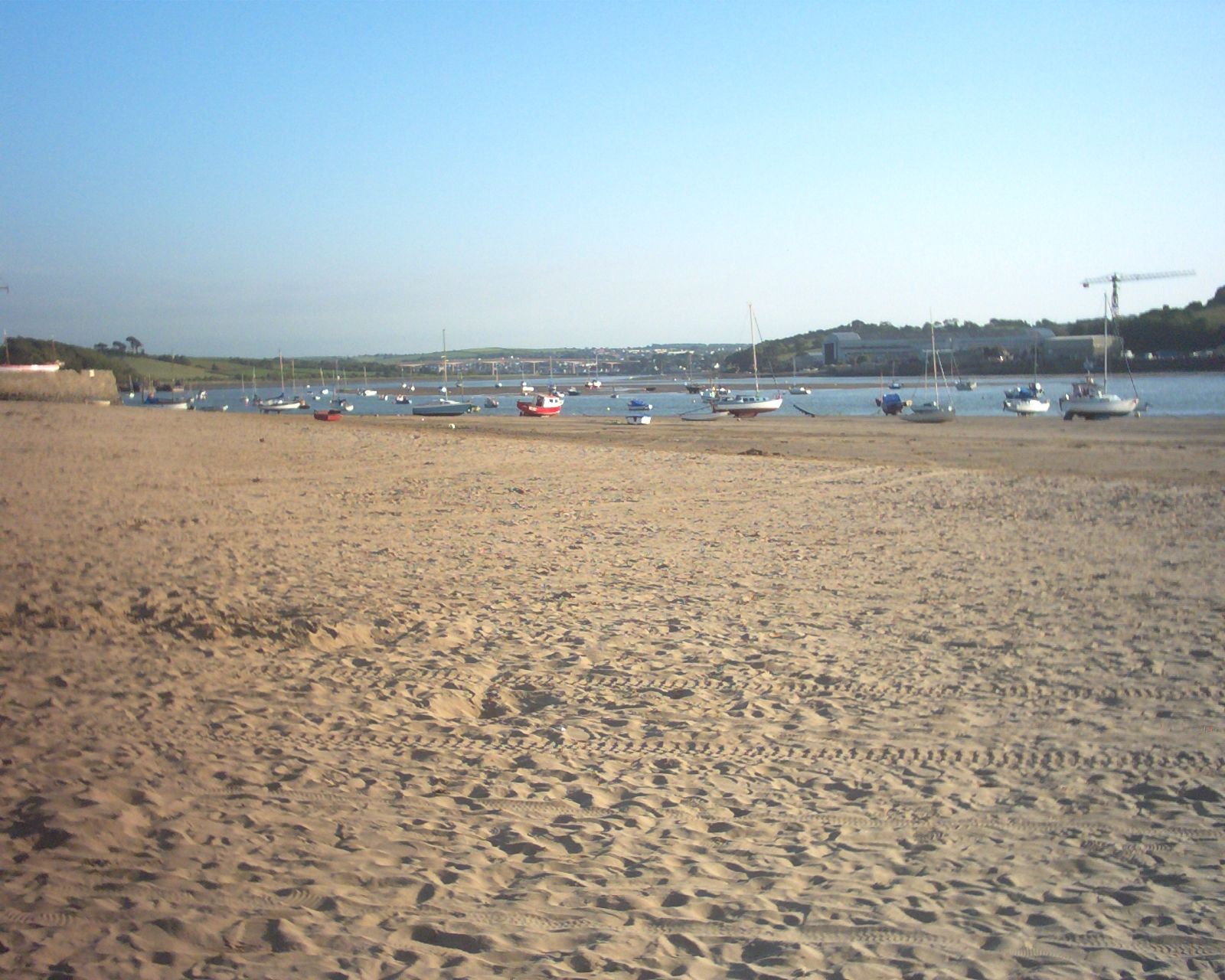
Instow Beach, overlooking River Torridge and A39 Torridge Bridge

Instow Beach also known as Instow Sands, is used widely during summer months at the peak of the tourist season. The beach is suitable for families as it enjoys few waves because of the sandbanks at the mouth of the estuary cancelling out most of the ocean swell. However, bathing water quality has regularly failed Environment Agency mandatory standards over the last few decades.

There is a large number of boats anchored on the sand. Many are only accessible at low-tide or via a dinghy or what is locally known as a tender. Windsurfing and kite surfing have become popular, taking advantage of the open position and calm waters. Canoeing and kayaking in the rivers to Instow beach is also popular.

=== Leading lights ===
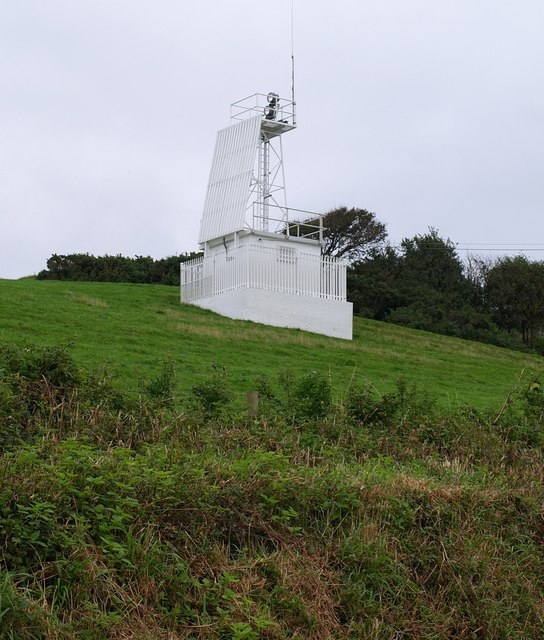
The rear of the two leading lights at Instow

In 1820 a pair of leading lights was established at Braunton Burrows to help guide vessels entering the Taw Torridge Estuary from Bideford Bay. Designed by Joseph Nelson, they were known as the Bideford High and Low Lights. When the ground they were on became unstable they were demolished (in 1957) and replaced by a new pair of leading lights at Instow. Initially the rear light was supported on a tubular steel structure (since replaced by a steel lattice structure) and the front light on a wooden structure, which was irreparably damaged in a storm in January 1990 and likewise replaced by a steel lattice tower. Both lights remain operational and are managed by Trinity House.

== RM Instow ==
Near the village is RM Instow, a military installation operated by the Royal Marines; the main unit which uses the camp is No. 11 (Amphibious Trials and Training) Squadron.

== Governance ==
The parish and built-up area had a population of 786 at the 2011 Census, which had dropped to 706 by the time of the 2011 Census. The ward had a population of 1,501 in 2011. The area is represented at Parliament under the North Devon.

== Notable people ==
- John Harmer (1857–1944), Bishop of Rochester, died in Instow
- Leonard Slater (1875–1914), English cricketer and British Army officer was born in Instow
- John Durnford-Slater (1909–1972), British Army officer credited with raising the first Army commando unit during the Second World War
- Robin Durnford-Slater (1902–1984), Royal Navy Admiral who went on to become the last Commander-In-Chief, The Nore
- David Shepherd (1940–2009), English cricketer and umpire
- Norah Simpson (1895–1974), Australian modernist artist, died at Crossways, Instow.

Instow features prominently in the 1919 novel Last of the Grenvilles by Frederick Harcourt Kitchin (under his pseudonym, Bennett Copplestone)

== Bus services ==
Instow is served by frequent Stagecoach services 21/21A between Georgeham/Ilfracombe, Barnstaple, Bideford and Westward Ho!/Appledore daily. These connect at Barnstaple with trains to Exeter and buses towards Exeter and Tiverton and at Bideford with buses towards Okehampton, Holsworthy and Hartland. Instow is also served by Stagecoach service 5B between Barnstaple, Bideford, Torrington, Winleigh, Crediton and Exeter and National Express coach services to London, Heathrow Airport, Taunton, Bristol and Birmingham.

== Ferry service ==
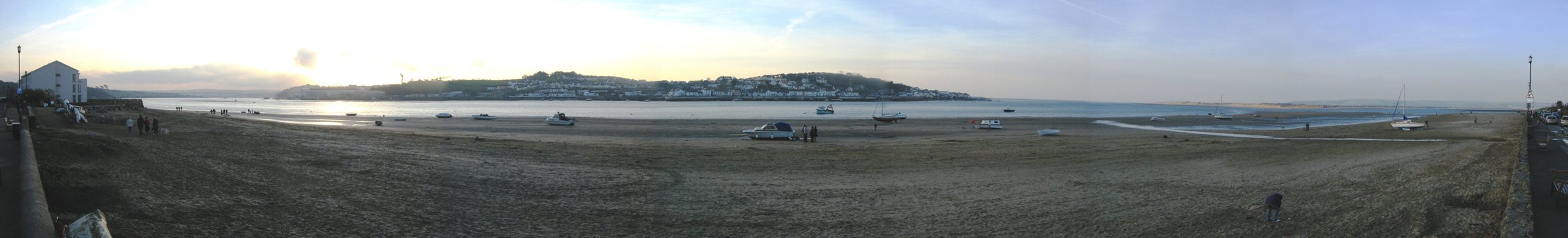
Panoramic view of Instow Beach

During summer a ferry service operates across the Torridge estuary from Instow Quay to Appledore slipway. The service runs two hours either side of high tide. Aimed both at locals and users of the Tarka Trail / South West Coast Path this has been operated in recent times as a not-for-profit service on days when water levels in the estuary have been high enough.
