= Edward Welchman =

English theologian (1665–1739)

Edward Welchman (1665–1739) was an English churchman, known as a theological writer. He was Archdeacon of Cardigan from 1727.

== Life ==
The son of John Welchman, of Banbury, Oxfordshire, he was born in 1665. He matriculated as a commoner of Magdalen Hall, Oxford, on 7 July 1679. He was one of the choristers of Magdalen College in that university from 1679 till 1682. He proceeded B.A. on 24 April 1683, was admitted a probationer fellow of Merton College in 1684, and commenced M.A. on 19 June 1688.

His college presented Welchman in 1690 to the rectory of Lapworth, Warwickshire, and he was also rector of Berkeswell in the same county. He became archdeacon of Cardigan and a prebendary of St. David's Cathedral on 7 August 1727. Later he became chaplain to the bishop of Lichfield, who collated him to the prebend of Wolvey in Lichfield Cathedral on 28 September 1732.

Welchman obtained the rectory of Solihull, Warwickshire, in 1736, and held it until his death on 19 May 1739. He was a friend of Deane Swift.

== Works ==
Welchman is counted as a Reformed theologian. His major work was a Latin explanation of the 39 Articles. An English translation from the sixth edition appeared 1776. It continued to be used at Oxford into a period towards the end of the 18th century when its Calvinist interpretations, for example of predestination, were falling out of fashion there.

Welchman's other publications included:

- A Defence of the Church of England from the Charge of Schism and Heresie, as laid against it by the Vindicator of the deprived Bishops (anon.), London, 1693. Against Henry Dodwell.
- The Husbandman's Manual: directing him how to improve the several actions of his calling, and the most usual occurrences of his life, to the glory of God, and the benefit of his soul, London, 1695; 25th edit. London, 1818; new edit. London, 1821. In the genre of the time of spiritual metaphors drawn from agriculture.
- A Practical Discourse on the Parable of Dives and Lazarus (1704)
- Dr. Clarke's Scripture Doctrine of the Trinity examined; to which are added some remarks on his sentiments, and a brief examination of his Doctrine, Oxford, 1714.
- An edition with notes of D. Aurelii Augustini Hipponensis Episcopi Liber de Hæresibus ad quod-vult-Deum, una cum Gennadii Massiliensis Appendice, Oxford, 1721.
- A Conference with an Arian; occasion'd by Mr. Whiston's Reply to the Earl of Nottingham (anon.), Oxford, 1721.
- A Dialogue betwixt a Protestant Minister and a Romish Priest, 3rd edit. London, 1723; 4th edit. 1735.
- Novatiani Presbyteri Romani Opera, quæ extant, omnia, correctius longe quam unquam antehac edita, notisque illustrata, Oxford, 1724.

== Family ==
Welchman's son John graduated M.A. at Oxford, and became vicar of Tamworth, Warwickshire.

== Notes ==
Attribution

This article incorporates text from a publication now in the public domain: Lee, Sidney, ed. (1899). "Welchman, Edward". Dictionary of National Biography. Vol. 60. London: Smith, Elder & Co.
