= David Thomas (archdeacon of Cardigan) =

British priest (1936–1944)

David William Thomas was the Archdeacon of Cardigan from 1936 until 1944.

Williams was educated at St David's College, Lampeter, and Jesus College, Oxford; and ordained in 1896. After curacies in Stella and Swansea he held incumbencies in Clydach and Llangyfelach. After a curacy at Llanelly he was Assistant Missioner in the Diocese of St Davids from 1903 to 1908; a Minor Canon of St Davids Cathedral and Senior Diocesan Inspector of Schools in the Diocese of St Davids from 1908 to 1912; Vicar of Llandybie from 1912 to 1928; Vicar of Lampeter from 1928 to 1946; and Vicar of Skenfrith from 1946 to 1948.

He died on 5 March 1951.

Church in Wales titles
Preceded by David Williams	Archdeacon of Cardigan; 1936–1944	Succeeded by Evan Daniel Aldred Williams
