= William Strange =

William Strange may refer to:

- William Strange, who gave name to Strange Creek, West Virginia
- William Alder Strange (1813–1874), English headmaster and author
- Billy Strange (William Everett Strange, 1930–2012), American musician and actor
- William Strange (priest) (born 1953), Anglican clergyman
- William Heath Strange, founded the Hampstead General Hospital

== See also ==
- Frederick William Strange (1844–1897), English-born Canadian physician and politician
- Maxwell W. Strange (Maxwell William Strange, 1820–1880), Canadian politician
- Wayde Preston (William Erksine Strange, 1929–1992), American actor
- William Strang (disambiguation)
