= Edward Talley =

Edward Talley may refer to:

- Edward Talley (priest), Welsh Anglican priest
- Edward R. Talley, U.S. Army soldier and Medal of Honor recipient
