= Linton Smith =

English Anglican bishop (1869–1950)

The Right Reverend Linton Smith DSO
- Bishop of Rochester
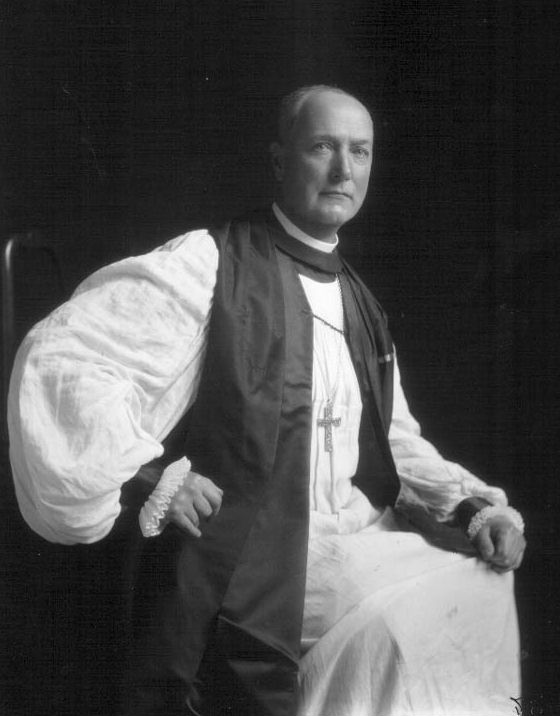
- Church: Church of England
- Diocese: Rochester
- Elected: 1930
- Term ended: 1940
- Predecessor: John Harmer
- Successor: Christopher Chavasse
- Other posts: Bishop of Hereford; 1920–1930; Bishop of Warrington; 1918–1920

Orders
- Ordination: 1894
- Consecration: c. 1918

Personal details
- Born: 4 July 1869
- Died: 7 October 1950 (aged 81)
- Denomination: Anglican
- Parents: James Allan Smith
- Spouse: Kathleen Dewe
- Children: some children
- Profession: Soldier
- Education: Hertford College, Oxford

Martin Linton Smith, DSO (4 July 1869 – 7 October 1950) was an Anglican bishop who served in three dioceses during the first half of the twentieth century.

== Life ==
Smith was born into a clerical family – his father was the Very Revd James Allan Smith, Dean of St David's Cathedral from 1904 until his death in 1918 He died in post during November 1918.– and educated at Repton and Hertford College, Oxford. Ordained priest in 1894 he was a curate at four parishes before securing his own incumbency at Colchester in 1902. By now married to Kathleen Dewe with a young family, he gained experience in Liverpool eventually becoming a Cathedral Canon. His finest hour, however, was the First World War where he gained the DSO for his sterling work at The Somme, Arras and Ypres. He had been appointed a Temporary Chaplain to the Forces in April, 1915, serving at first in Prescott before being posted abroad. He was also Mentioned in Despatches.

When peace came he was raised to the episcopate, firstly for two years as the suffragan Bishop of Warrington; then translated to the more senior post of diocesan Bishop of Hereford in 1920, serving there for a decade; and, finally, a further nine years as Bishop of Rochester. Retiring to Cheltenham in 1940 he died after a long life "rich in service".

== Works ==
Lambeth and Reunion: An Interpretation of the Mind of the Lambeth Conference of 1920, with Frank Theodore Woods and Martin Linton Smith (London: Society for Promoting Christian Knowledge, 1921).

=== Book cited ===
- Hesilrige, Arthur G. M. (1921). Debrett's Peerage and Titles of courtesy. 160A, Fleet street, London, UK: Dean & Son. p. 467.

Church of England titles
New title	Bishop of Warrington; 1918–1920	Succeeded by Edwin Kempson
Preceded by Hensley Henson	Bishop of Hereford; 1920–1930	Succeeded by Charles Lisle Carr
Preceded by John Harmer	Bishop of Rochester; 1930–1940	Succeeded by Christopher Chavasse
