= John Luntley =

Welsh Anglican priest

John Luntley was Archdeacon of Cardigan from 1534 to 1542.

Luntley was educated at the University of Oxford.
