= David Williams (priest, born 1862) =

Archdeacon of Cardigan from 1928–1936

David Williams (1862–1936) was the Archdeacon of Cardigan from 1928 until his death.

Williams was educated at Llandysul Grammar School and Durham University; and ordained in 1890. He was a theology exhibitioner at Hatfield Hall. After curacies in Stella and Swansea he held incumbencies in Clydach and Llangyfelach. He died on 24 March 1936.

Church in Wales titles
Preceded by David Williams	Archdeacon of Cardigan; 1928–1936	Succeeded by David William Thomas
