= David Watcyn Morgan =

Welsh priest (1859–1940)

David Watcyn Morgan (or Watkin-Morgan; 7 March 1859 – 6 May 1940) was the seventh Dean of St David's. from 1931 to 1940

He was born in 1859 and educated at St David's College, Lampeter and became Perpetual curate of Morriston in 1886. He was a Canon of St David's Cathedral from 1919 until his accession to the Deanery. He died in post on 6 May 1940 and is buried at Old Road Cemetery, Carmarthenshire.

Church in Wales titles
Preceded by William Williams	Dean of St Davids; 1931–1940	Succeeded by Albert William Parry
