= James Allen (priest, born 1802) =

Welsh Anglican clergyman (1802–1897)

James Allen (15 July 1802 – 26 June 1897) was an Anglican clergyman, the second Dean of St David's.

Allen was born in Burton, Pembrokeshire. He was educated at Westminster, Charterhouse and Trinity College, Cambridge, graduating in 1825. He was Vicar of Castlemartin from 1839 to 1872, and a Canon Residentiary at St David's before his elevation to the Deanery.
He died on 26 June 1897 at St David's.

Church of England titles
| Preceded by Llewelyn Lewellin | Dean of St Davids; 1879 –1895 | Succeeded by Evan Owen Phillips |
