= Aldred Williams =

British archdeacon (1879–1951)

(Evan Daniel) Aldred Williams (20 August 1879 – 25 January 1951) was the Archdeacon of Cardigan from 1944 until his death.

Williams was educated at Llandovery College, St David's College, Lampeter and St Michael's College, Llandaff; and ordained in 1903. After curacies in Swansea and Carmarthen he held incumbencies at Golden Grove, Llansamlet, Dafen and Llanddewi

He died on 5 March 1951.

Church in Wales titles
Preceded by David William Thomas	Archdeacon of Cardigan; 1944–1951	Succeeded by Richard Ward
