= Richard Middleton (priest) =

English priest (died 1641)

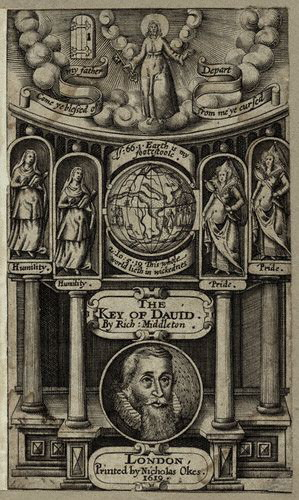
Richard Middleton, on the title page of his book The Key of David (1619).

Richard Middleton (died 1641) was a Church of England clergyman and writer who served as Archdeacon of Cardigan and chaplain to Charles, Prince of Wales (later King Charles I).

== Life ==
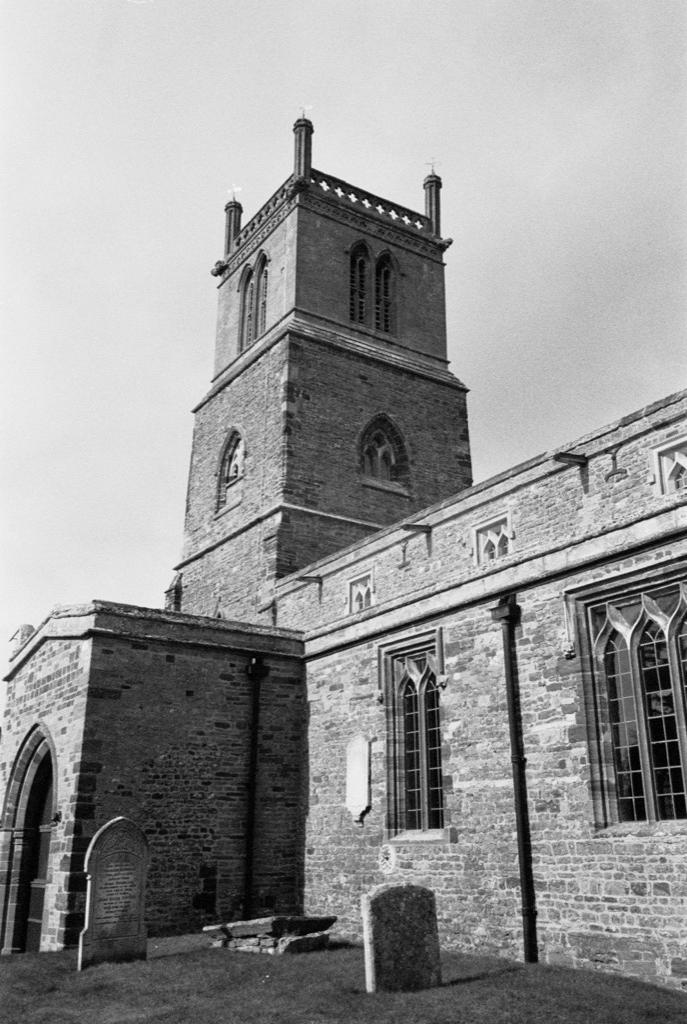
The church at Ecton, Northamptonshire, where Middleton was rector from 1629 to 1641

Middleton obtained a BA degree from Jesus College, Oxford in 1586. He was ordained and became vicar of Llanarthne, Carmarthenshire in south Wales, and then in 1589 obtained two posts in the Diocese of St Davids: prebend of Brecon and archdeacon of Cardigan. (He may have been the son of Marmaduke Middleton, Bishop of St Davids, who died in 1593.) He also served as vicar of Tenby from 1617 to 1624. He was nominated to become vicar of Leeds in 1614, which caused considerable dispute since there was another candidate backed by leading parishioners and by Tobias Matthew, the Archbishop of York. The Court of Chancery ruled against Middleton. He had, meanwhile, been appointed chaplain to Charles, Prince of Wales (later King Charles I). He wrote The Carde and Compasse of Life in 1613, a manual of advice to the prince. A later work, The Heavenly Progresse (1617) contained further advice to Charles that a good prince was not above the law, using quotations from classical authors to justify his reasoning. His other works included The Key of David (1619) and Goodness the Blessed Man's Badge (1619).

He remained Archdeacon of Cardigan in 1629 when he exchanged positions with William Parker to become rector of Ecton, Northamptonshire – a well-rewarded position. His wife, Margaret, was buried in Ecton in 1635; there is nothing to show that they had children. He died on 16 November 1641, and was also buried in Ecton.
