= David Howell (priest) =

British Anglican priest

David Howell (16 August 1831 – 15 January 1903) was the fourth Dean of St David's from 1897 to 1903.

== Life ==
Howell was the son of John Howell, farmer and Calvinistic Methodist deacon, of Treos, in the parish of Llangan, Glamorganshire. His mother being of weak health, he was brought up for the most part by his grandmother, Mary Griffiths of Tynycaeau, a church-woman. At the age of fifteen, he returned to his father's home, which was now at Bryn Cwtyn, near Pencoed. Farming, however, was not to his mind, and, having shown a decided bent for letters, he was persuaded by his mother and the rector of St. Mary Hill (afterwards well known as Archdeacon Griffiths of Neath) to prepare for orders in the Church of England. He studied at the Eagle School, Cowbridge, the Preparatory School, Merthyr, and the Llandaff Diocesan Institute at Abergavenny.

He was ordained deacon in 1855 and priest in 1856, and began his career as Curate of Neath from 1855 to 1857. After that he was secretary for Wales of the Church Pastoral Aid Society from 1857 to 1861, then successively Vicar of Pwllheli 1861–64, St John The Baptist in Cardiff 1865-75, Wrexham 1875-91, and Gresford 1891–97. In addition he also held the offices of Rural Dean of Wrexham from 1882 to 1892, examining chaplain to the Bishop of St Asaph from 1889 to 1893, Prebendary of Meliden and Canon of St Asaph from 1889 to 1893, and Archdeacon of Wrexham from 1889 to 1897. He was then elevated to the Deanery in April 1897, serving until his death in January 1903.

== Family ==
Howell married Anne Powell of Pencoed; they had several children, one of four sons was William Tudor Howell. Their eldest daughter Catherine Howell married Rev. James Protheroe, Archdeacon of Cardigan.

Church of England titles
Preceded by Owen Phillips	Dean of St Davids; 1897–1903	Succeeded by James Allan Smith
