= Caeathro =

Village in Gwynedd, Wales

Coordinates: 53.131°N 4.242°W

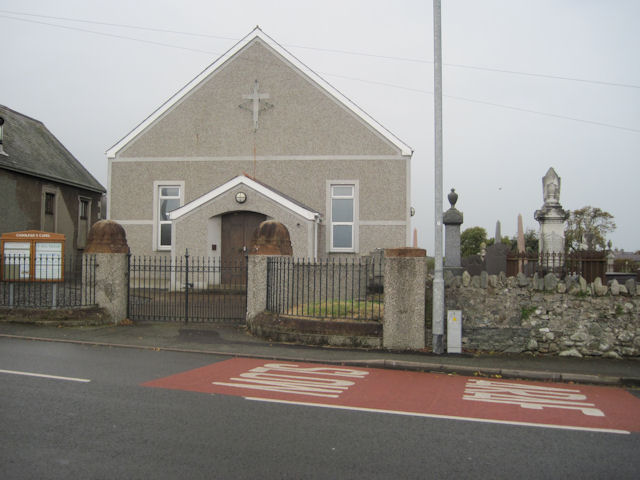
- Caeathro Chapel

- Location within Gwynedd
- Population: 237
- OS grid reference: SH500616
- Community: Waunfawr
- Principal area: Gwynedd
- Preserved county: Gwynedd
- Country: Wales
- Sovereign state: United Kingdom
- Post town: CAERNARFON
- Postcode district: LL55
- Dialling code: 01286
- Police: North Wales
- Fire: North Wales
- Ambulance: Welsh
- UK Parliament: Dwyfor Meirionnydd
- Senedd Cymru – Welsh Parliament: Gwynedd Maldwyn

Caeathro is a village situated on the A4085 road between Caernarfon and Waunfawr in Gwynedd, northwest Wales. It is one and a half miles (2.4 km) from Caernarfon and two miles (3.2 km) from Waunfawr, and is part of the community of Waunfawr. The population was 237 as of the 2011 census.

The hymn writer William Owen Prysgol (1813–1893), who composed the hymn tune Bryn Calfaria, served as precentor of Caeathro Chapel and is buried in the graveyard.
