= Edward Jenkins (priest) =

British Anglican priest (1902–1996)

Thomas Edward Jenkins (known as Edward; 14 August 1902 – 28 August 1996) was an eminent Anglican priest.

Jenkins was educated at St David's College, Lampeter. He was ordained in 1925 and began his ecclesiastical career with a curacy at Llanelli. From 1934 to 1938 he was Rector of Begelly. From then until 1946 he was Vicar of Christ Church, Llanelli after which he was Rural Dean of Lampeter. He was Vicar of Cardigan from 1955 to 1957 when he became Dean of St David's, a post he held for 15 years.

Church in Wales titles
Preceded by Carlyle Witton-Davies	Dean of St Davids; 1957–1972	Succeeded by Lawrence Bowen
