= Lawrence Bowen =

Welsh priest

Lawrence Bowen was an Anglican priest.

He was born on 9 September 1914 and educated at Llanelli Grammar School and the University College of Wales, Aberystwyth. He was ordained in 1938 and began his career with a curacy at Pembrey. From 1940 to 1946 he was a Minor Canon of St David's Cathedral. From then until 1964 he was Vicar of St Clears after which he was Rector of Tenby. In 1972 he became Dean of St David's, a post he held for 12 years. He died on 26 September 1994.

Church in Wales titles
Preceded by Thomas Edward Jenkins	Dean of St Davids; 1972–1984	Succeeded by Alexander Gordon MacWilliam
