= Richard Ward (priest) =

British archdeacon

- Archdeacon of Cardigan
- Installed: 1951
- Term ended: 1962

Personal details
- Education: Bangor University

Richard Ward was the Archdeacon of Cardigan from 1951 until 1962.

Ward was educated at the Bangor University and St. Michael's College, Llandaff; and ordained in 1911. After curacies in Holyhead, Llanaber and Aberystwyth he was a Minor Canon at Bangor Cathedral. He held incumbencies at Llanddyfnan, Dowlais, Aberdare and Aberystwyth

Church in Wales titles
Preceded by Evan Daniel Aldred Williams	Archdeacon of Cardigan; 1951–1962	Succeeded by John Owen Jenkins
