= John Harmer (bishop) =

Anglican Bishop (1857–1944)

- Bishop of Rochester
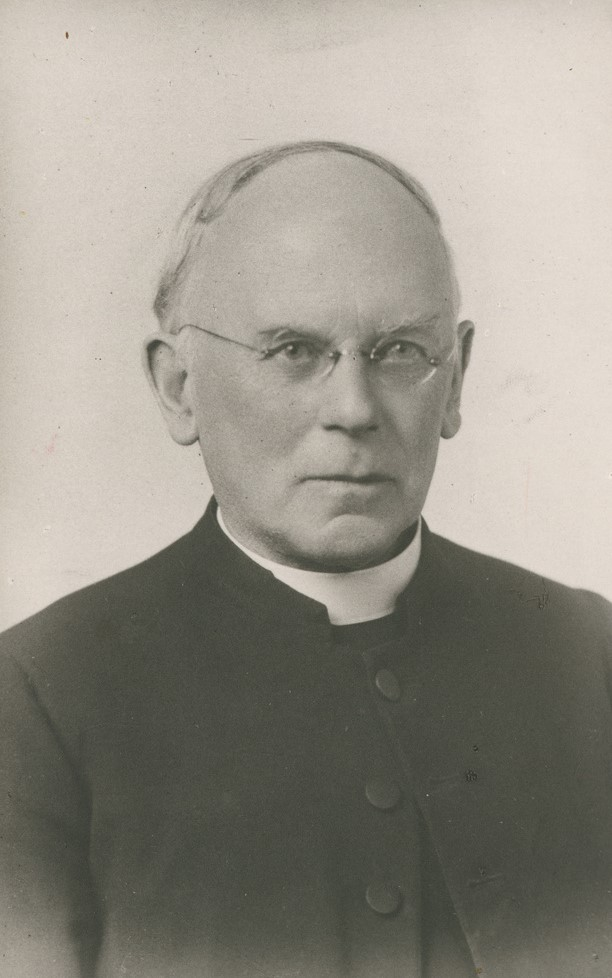
- Church: Church of England
- Diocese: Rochester
- In office: 1905–1930
- Predecessor: Edward Talbot
- Successor: Linton Smith
- Other post: Bishop of Adelaide (1895–1905)

Orders
- Ordination: 1884
- Consecration: 23 May 1895, Westminster Abbey

Personal details
- Born: 11 August 1857
- Died: 9 March 1944 (aged 86) Instow, Devon
- Buried: Rochester Cathedral
- Denomination: Anglican
- Residence: Bishop's Court, Adelaide; 1895–1905; Bishopscourt, Rochester; 1905–1930
- Parents: George Harmer & Kate Kitching
- Spouse: Mary Cocks
- Children: at least one daughter
- Education: King's College, Cambridge

John Reginald Harmer (11 August 1857 – 9 March 1944) was a long-serving Anglican bishop who served in two dioceses.

== Early life ==
Harmer was born into a clerical family (his parents were George Harmer, Vicar of Maisemore, and Kate, née Kitching) and educated at Eton College and King's College, Cambridge. Ordained priest in 1884, he was a curate at Monkwearmouth before becoming Vice-Principal of the Clergy Training School in Cambridge.

== Biography ==
From 1892, he was Dean of Corpus Christi College, Cambridge before appointment to the colonial episcopate with his election as Bishop of Adelaide in March 1895. He was consecrated a bishop in Westminster Abbey and 23 May and was enthroned at St Peter's Cathedral, Adelaide on 4 July 1895. In 1905, he was translated back to England when he was elected Bishop of Rochester. He was enthroned at Rochester Cathedral in July 1905 and served for a quarter of a century before his retirement in 1930.

He was an active English and Australian Freemason, initiated in St Alban's Lodge in Adelaide, and later transferring his membership to England.

Harmer died at Marine Cottage, Instow, and was buried at Rochester Cathedral. His portraits remain at his former official residences of Bishop's Court, Adelaide and Bishopscourt, Rochester.

=== During the Great War ===
As Bishop of Rochester, Harper presided over a diocese which by ‘its geographical position and its naval and military importance’, was at the forefront of the Great War. He blamed German philosophers and Prussian militarism for the War, and spoke of Britain's determination to protect ‘the sanctity of treaties, the liberty of the smaller nations, and the cause of the weak, the downtrodden and the non-combatants’.

Late in his life, Harmer would be most proud of the work he did in support of Belgian refugees displaced by the German advance.

Under Harmer's leadership, the diocese encouraged voluntary recruitment to the forces, praised clergy, clergy families and ex-pupils of church schools for their commitment to the War, provided support including leisure facilities and billets for soldiers and sailors stationed in the area and for women working in munitions factories and gave care and comfort to casualties and their families.

Writing in an unpublished autobiography just before his death, Harmer recalled the casualties from the sinking of three ships from Chatham one day in September 1914 resulting in one street in Gillingham having 30 widows. He remembered the bombing of a drill shed in 1917 with 147 killed and a funeral cortège one mile long, which he joined. He could hear from his home the sound of the guns in Flanders. ‘Indeed, difficult as it may be to credit, the firing was at certain times as audible as the thud of the football from the field opposite our house where the soldiers were at their games.’

During the War, Harmer ‘threw open his house with enjoyment to every rank of soldier and sailor.’

He was an active English and Australian Freemason, initiated in St Alban's Lodge in Adelaide, and later transferring his membership to England.

Harmer died at Marine Cottage, Instow, and was buried at Rochester Cathedral. His portraits remain at his former official residences of Bishop's Court, Adelaide and Bishopscourt, Rochester.

Anglican Communion titles
Preceded by George Kennion	Bishop of Adelaide; 1895–1905	Succeeded by A. Nutter Thomas
Preceded by Edward Talbot	Bishop of Rochester; 1905–1930	Succeeded by Linton Smith
