= William Owen (priest) =

Welsh Anglican priest (died 1680)

William Owen (died 1680) was a Welsh Anglican priest in the 17th century. Owen was born in Pembrokeshire and educated at St John's College, Oxford, graduating BA from 1631. He became rector of Dinas in 1640; treasurer of St Davids Cathedral in 1661; and archdeacon of Cardigan in 1668. He died in 1680.
