= Leonard Slater =

English cricketer and British Army officer

Personal information
- Full name: Leonard Slater
- Born: 11 October 1875; Instow, Devon, England
- Died: 14 September 1914 (aged 38); Aisne, France

Domestic team information
- Years: Team
- 1909: Gentlemen of the South
- 1904: Devon

Career statistics
Competition	First-class
Matches	1
Runs scored	15
Batting average	7.50
100s/50s	–/–
Top score	15
Balls bowled	–
Wickets	–
Bowling average	–
5 wickets in innings	–
10 wickets in match	–
Best bowling	–
Catches/stumpings	–/–
- Source: Cricinfo, 12 February 2011

Leonard Slater (11 October 1875 − 14 September 1914) was an English cricketer and British Army officer. He was born in Instow, Devon, the son of Rev. Francis Slater and Mrs. Harriet Slater.

Slater spent some part of this life in the British Raj, where he played cricket for Peshawar and Northern Punjab, at a time when neither team had first-class status. He played for both teams in the 1902/03 season. Returning to England, he played a single Minor Counties Championship match for Devon against Glamorgan.

Five years later, he played his only first-class match when he represented the Gentlemen of the South against the Players of the South at the Central Recreation Ground, Hastings. In his only first-class match he scored 15 runs. In the Gentlemen's first-innings he scored 15 runs before being bowled by Albert Relf. In their second-innings he was dismissed for a duck by George Dennett. This left him with a first-class batting average of 7.50.

They had two sons, Leonard Slater born in 1902 in the Punjab and John Slater born in 1909. Leonard Slater would later be known as Admiral Robin Durnford-Slater of the Royal Navy. The younger son John would later lead a distinguished military career and would be credited with forming the first Army commando unit during the Second World War and who during the course of the war was awarded the Distinguished Service Order.

Slater later served in the First World War in the 2nd Battalion of the Royal Sussex Regiment and held the rank of Captain. On 14 September 1914, he was killed in action during the First Battle of the Aisne. His body was laid to rest at the Vendresse British Cemetery.

His name was etched on several memorials following his death, including the War Memorial at Instow and having the south side of nave of St. John the Baptist Church in Instow dedicated to him. His name is also etched on the Godalming War Memorial in Godalming, Surrey.
