= William Owens =

William Owens, Bill, or Billy Owens may refer to:

== Arts and entertainment ==
- William A. Owens (1905–1990), American folklorist
- Bill Owens (songwriter) (1935–2021), American country music songwriter
- Bill Owens (photographer) (born 1938), American photographer

== Law and politics ==
- William Owens (Canadian politician) (1840–1917), Canadian politician
- William Claiborne Owens (1849–1925), American politician
- Bill Owens (Massachusetts politician) (born 1937), American politician
- William C. Owens Jr. (born 1947), American politician
- Bill Owens (New York politician) (born 1949), American politician
- Bill Owens (Colorado politician) (born 1950), American politician

== Sports ==
- Oscar Owens (William Oscar Owens; 1893–1960), American baseball player
- Will Owens (William John Owens, 1901–1999), American Negro leagues baseball player
- Billy Owens (American football) (born 1965), American football player
- Billy Owens (born 1969), African-American basketball player

== Others ==
- William Owens (admiral) (born 1940), United States Navy admiral and businessman
- William Owens (Navy SEAL) (1980–2017), United States Navy SEALs senior chief petty officer
- Bill Owens (producer), American television producer for the program 60 Minutes

== Fictional characters ==
- Captain Bill Owens, fictional character, Fantastic Voyage
- Billy Owens, main character of The Mystical Adventures of Billy Owens and its sequel, Billy Owens and the Secret of the Runes

== See also ==
- William Owen (disambiguation)
- Will Owen (disambiguation)
- Bill Owen (disambiguation)
