= David Williams (priest, born 1841) =

British priest (1841–1929)

David Williams (3 October 1841 – 20 November 1929) was the Archdeacon of Cardigan from 1903 until 1928.

Williams was educated at Llandovery College and Jesus College, Oxford; and ordained in 1867. After a curacy in Carmarthen he was Rector of Merthyr, Carmarthenshire from 1868 to 1887; Rural Dean of Carmarthen from 1885 to 1887; Prebendary of St David's Cathedral from 1886 to 1903; and Vicar of Holy Trinity, Aberystwyth from 1887 to 1928.

Church in Wales titles
Preceded by James Harvard Protheroe	Archdeacon of Cardigan; 1903–1928	Succeeded by David Williams
