= Llewelyn Lewellin =

British priest (1798–1878)

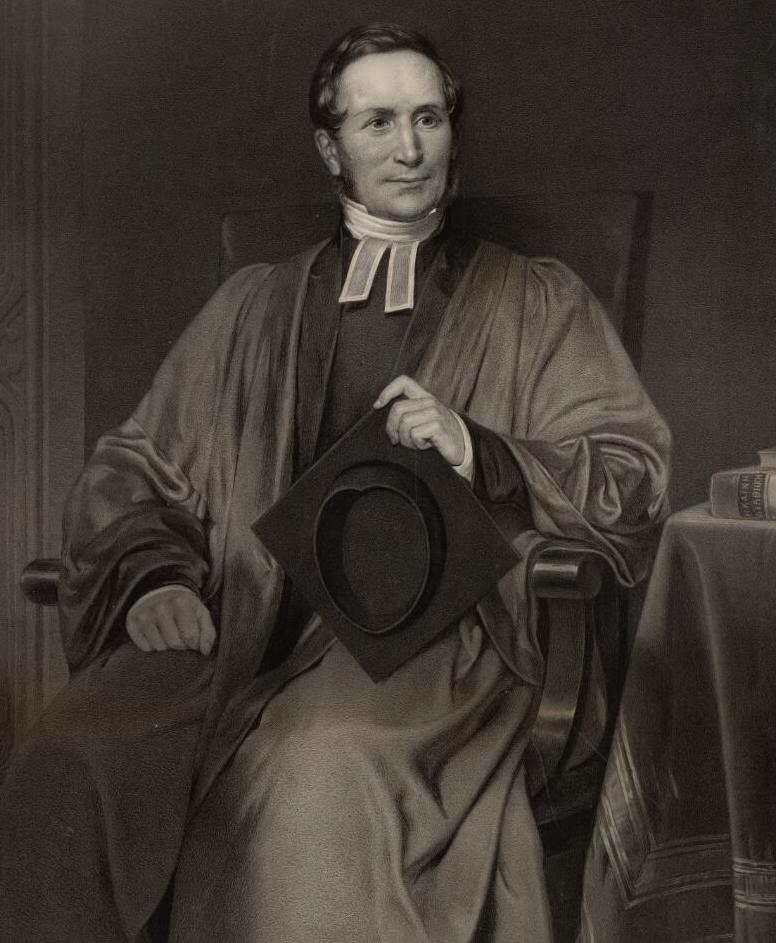
Portrait of Llewelyn Lewellin

Llewelyn Lewellin (3 August 1798 – 25 November 1878) was a cleric and academic, the first principal of St David's College, Lampeter and the first Dean of St Davids.

== Biography ==
Lewellin was born at Tremains, Coity, near Bridgend, Glamorgan, the third son of Richard and Maria Lewellin. He was educated at Cowbridge Grammar School and Jesus College, Oxford, graduating with a BA in 1822, an MA in 1824, a BCL in 1827 and a DCL in 1829. Whilst studying at Oxford, he was ordained deacon in 1822 and priest in 1823 by the bishop of Oxford. In 1826, Lewellin was offered the headmastership of Bruton Grammar School, Somerset. However, instead of taking this up, he took on a position at Saint David's College (now part of the University of Wales, Trinity Saint David), as its first principal in 1827. His initial appointments were as professor of Greek and senior professor of Theology, as well as that of Principal. He remained as principal until his death, two days after giving a lecture in Greek. He was buried in the churchyard of St. Peter's Church, Lampeter. Lewellin was active in wider Lampeter life. He was the vicar of Lampeter from 1833 until his death, and he served on the magistrates' bench at nearby Aberaeron. In 1840, he became Dean of St Davids Cathedral, living at St Davids during college vacations.

Academic offices
Preceded by Inaugural appointment	Principal of St David's College; 1827–1878	Succeeded by Francis John Jayne
Church of England titles
Preceded by Inaugural appointment	Dean of St Davids; 1840–1878	Succeeded by James Allen
