= All Saints Chapel, Instow =

Church in Devon, England

All Saints Chapel
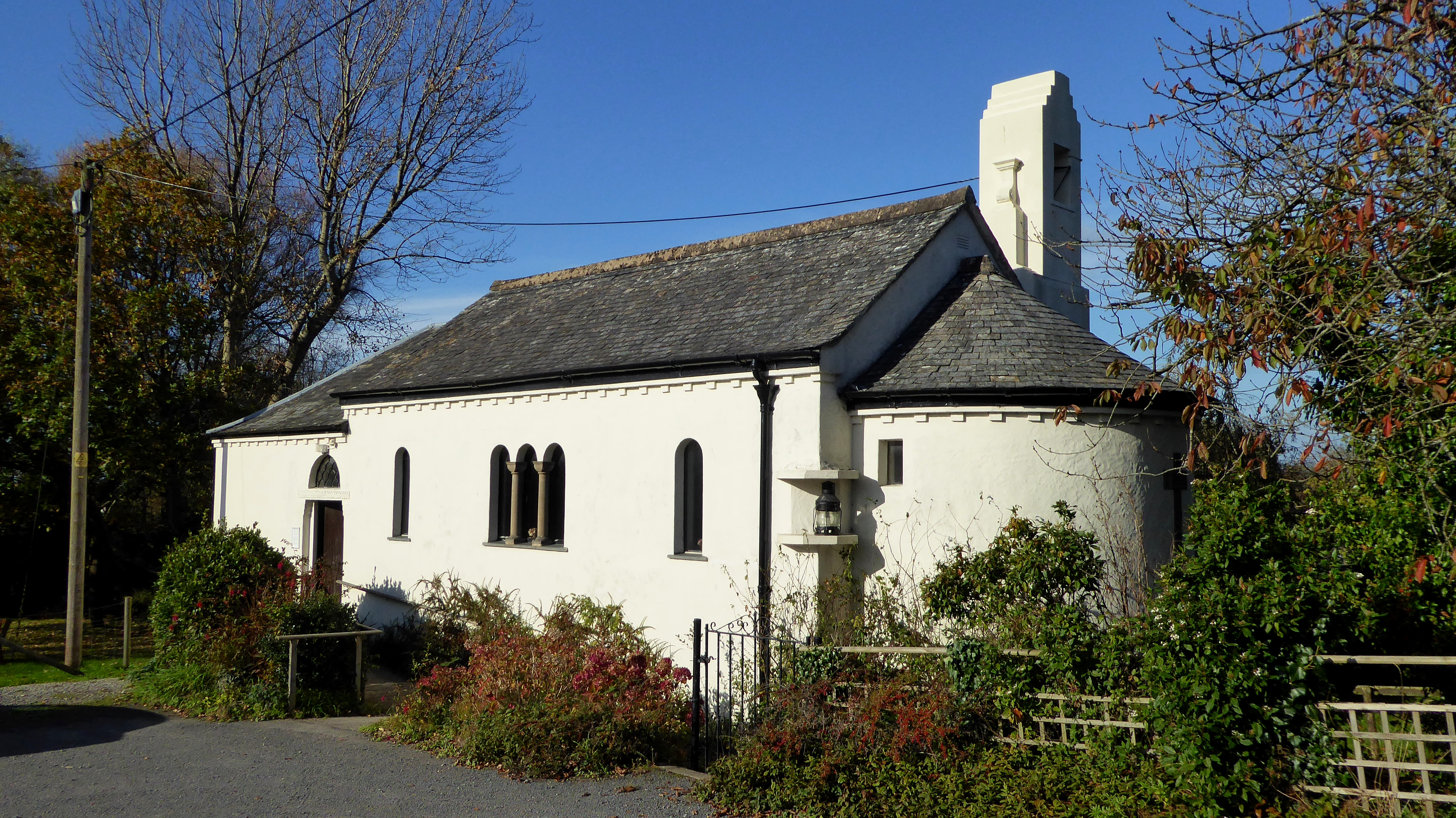

Religion
- Affiliation: Church of England
- Ecclesiastical or organizational status: Active

Location
- Location: Instow, Devon, England
- Interactive map of All Saints Chapel
- Coordinates: 51.0538°N 4.1789°W

Architecture
- Architect: Burnett Napier Henderson Orphoot
- Type: Church
- Completed: 1936

All Saints Chapel is a combined Church of England chapel and community centre in Instow, Devon, England.

== History ==
All Saints was designed by the local architect Mr. Burnett Napier Henderson Orphoot in memory of his late wife, Marjorie Harriet Orphoot, who died in 1933. Once constructed and furnished at his sole expense, Orphoot gifted the building to Instow as a chapel of ease to the parish church of St John. It was built on a plot of land provided by Mrs. Orphoot's sister, in an area of the village over half a mile from the parish church.

Construction of the chapel began in September 1935, and it was dedicated by the Bishop of Exeter, the Right Rev. Lord William Cecil, on 27 February 1936. Today services at the chapel are held weekly between November and Easter and monthly during the summer. It also serves as a community centre.

== Architecture ==
Orphoot designed the chapel in the Renaissance style, with seating for 45 people. The building has an apse at its east end, which contains a stone altar inlaid with Italian mosaics. The mahogany roof timbers were sourced from HMS Revenge. The east bellcote contains a single bell, supplied by Gillett & Johnston.
