= William Williams (priest) =

Anglican priest (born 1848)

William Williams was the sixth Dean of St David's.

He was born in 1848, educated at St David's College, Lampeter and ordained in 1872. He was Curate of Lampeter and then of Oswestry. He held incumbencies at Llanuwchllyn, Llanfair Talhaiarn and Dolgellau. He was Diocesan Missioner for St David's from 1893 until 1899 and Vicar of St David's until 1903. He was then Rector of Jeffreston until his accession to the Deanery in 1919.He died in post on 8 November 1930.

Church in Wales titles
Preceded by James Allan Smith	Dean of St Davids; 1919–1930	Succeeded by David Watcyn Morgan
