= Jonathan Hughes =

Jonathan Hughes may refer to:

- Jonathan Hughes (poet) (1721–1805), Welsh poet
- Jonathan Hughes (cricketer) (born 1981), Welsh cricketer
- Jonathan Hughes (rabbi), British rabbi

== See also ==
- John Hughes (disambiguation)
