= Bill Strang =

Bill Strang may refer to:

- Bill Strang (footballer) (1883–1937), Australian rules footballer
- Bill Strang (engineer) (1921–1999), British aerospace engineer

== See also ==
- William Strang (disambiguation)
