= Carlyle Witton-Davies =

Anglican priest (1913–1993)

Carlyle Witton-Davies (10 June 1913 – 25 March 1993) was an Anglican priest and scholar.

He was born the son of T. Witton-Davies, Professor of Hebrew at the University College of North Wales, Bangor and educated at Friars School, Bangor; University College of North Wales, Bangor; Exeter College, Oxford;and Ripon College Cuddesdon.

He was ordained in 1938 and began his ecclesiastical career with a curacy at Buckley. From 1940 to 1944 he was Subwarden of St. Michael's College, Llandaff. From then until 1949 he was a Canon Residentiary at St. George's Cathedral, Jerusalem. In that year he became Dean and Precentor of St David's. His last senior post was as Archdeacon of Oxford (1957–1982).

Church in Wales titles
Preceded by Albert William Parry	Dean of St Davids; 1949–1957	Succeeded by Thomas Edward Jenkins
Church of England titles
Preceded by Gerald Burton Allen	Archdeacon of Oxford; 1957–1982	Succeeded by Frank Weston
