= Bertie Lewis (priest) =

British priest (born 1931)

Bertie Lewis (24 August 1931 – 3 April 2006) was the 13th Dean of St David's between 1990 and 1994.

He was born on 24 August 1931 and educated at St David's College, Lampeter and St Catherine's College, Oxford. He was ordained after a period of study at Wycliffe Hall, Oxford in 1958 and began his career with curacies at Cwmaman and Aberystwyth St Michael. He held incumbencies at Llanddewibrefi, Henfynyw and Lampeter. From 1986 to 1990 he was Archdeacon of Cardigan, following which he entered the Deanery. His last post before retirement was as Vicar of Nevern.

He died on 3 April 2006 aged 74, having suffered in his latter years from Parkinson's disease.

Church in Wales titles
Preceded by Alexander Gordon MacWilliam	Dean of St Davids; 1990–1994	Succeeded by John Wyn Evans
