= James Allan Smith =

British Anglican priest (1841–1918)

James Allan Smith (also spelled Alan; 2 August 1841 – 29 November 1918) was the fifth Dean of St Davids.

Smith was born into an ecclesiastical family in Pyecombe — his father was James Allan Smith, Rector of that parish — on 2 August 1841 and educated at Wadham College and ordained in 1864. He was initially Curate of Trinity Church, St Marylebone and then Vicar of Holy Trinity, Nottingham. Moving to Wales he was successively Vicar of Swansea, Rural Dean of East Gower, Vicar of Hay, Chancellor of St Davids Cathedral and Canon Residentiary before his elevation to the Deanery in 1904.. He had become a Doctor of Divinity (DD).

Smith married Charlotte Isabella Linton (who died on 5 February 1900, in her 63rd year), eldest daughter of Henry Linton, of Stertloe, Buckden, Huntingdon, and honorary Canon of Christ Church, Oxford. Their son was Linton Smith, Bishop of Warrington, of Hereford and then of Rochester.

He died in post during November 1918.. He is buried in Oystermouth Cemetery, Mumbles, Swansea, alongside Charlotte and two other sons James Duncan and Henry Faithful Smith.

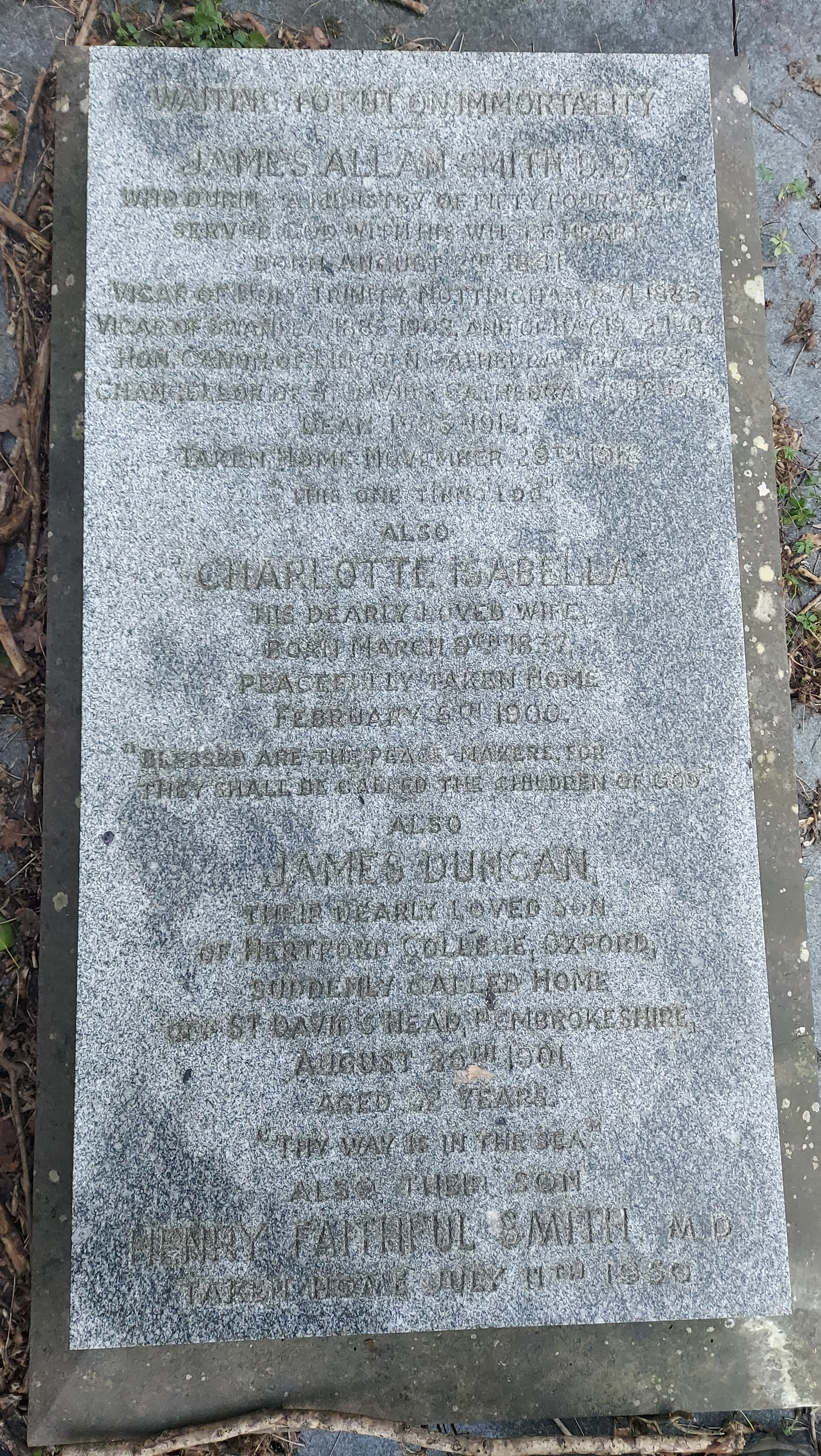
Gravestone of James Allan Smith and family, Oystermouth Cemetery, Mumbles, Swansea, UK.

Church of England titles
| Preceded by David Howell | Dean of St Davids; 1904–1918 | Succeeded by William Williams |
