= Gordon MacWilliam =

British priest (1923–2014)

Alexander Gordon MacWilliam (22 August 1923 - 24 October 2014) was an Anglican priest.

MacWilliam was educated at the Universities of Wales and London. He was ordained in 1947 and began his career with a curacy at Penygroes. From 1949 to 1955 he was a Minor Canon of Bangor Cathedral. From then until 1958 he was Rector of Llanfaethlu after which he was at Trinity College, Carmarthen until 1984. In that year he became Dean of St David's, a post he held for 6 years.

Church in Wales titles
Preceded by Lawrence Bowen	Dean of St Davids; 1984–1990	Succeeded by Bertie Lewis
