= William Strang (disambiguation) =

William Strang may refer to:

- William B. Strang Jr. (1857–1921), American railroad magnate who founded Overland Park, Kansas
- William Strang (1859–1921), Scottish painter and printmaker
- William Strang (1878–1916), Scottish footballer
- William Strang, 1st Baron Strang, (1893–1978), British diplomat

== See also ==
- Bill Strang (disambiguation)
- William Strange (disambiguation)
