= Owen Phillips (priest) =

Welsh Anglican priest (1826–1897)

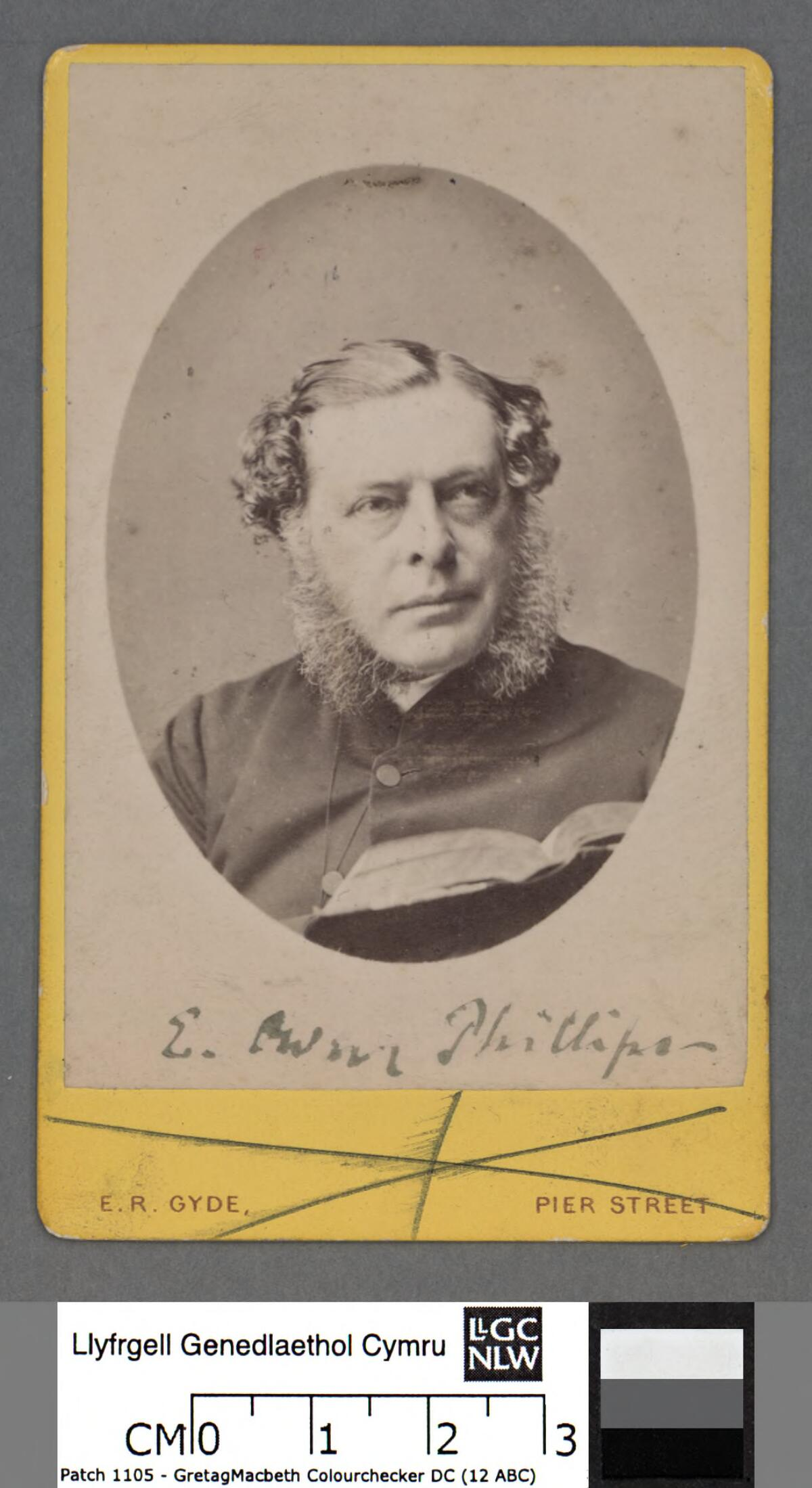
Portrait of E. Owen Phillips.

Evan Owen Phillips (27 April 1826 – 2 March 1897) was a Welsh Anglican priest, the third Dean of St David's.

He was educated at Corpus Christi College, Cambridge and graduated BA as 18th Wrangler in 1849. Ordained in 1850, he was Warden of the Welsh College, Llandovery from 1854 to 1861 and held incumbencies at Aberystwyth and Letterston. He was Chancellor of St David's Cathedral from 1879 until his elevation to the Deanery in 1895.
A Fellow of his old college, he died on 2 March 1897.

Church of England titles
Preceded by James Allen	Dean of St Davids; 1895–1897	Succeeded by David Howell
