= Albert Parry =

Welsh priest (1874–1950)

Albert William Parry (15 October 1874 – 18 September 1950) was a Welsh clergyman who served as the eighth Dean of St David's between 1940 and 1949 and Editor of Y Llan and Church News, the newspaper of the Church in Wales.

He was born in Carmel, Flintshire, Wales, and educated at St David's College, Lampeter and St Michael's Theological College, Llandaff. He was Curate of St John's Church, Cardiff and then lecturer, tutor and finally professor of education at St Luke's College, Exeter. From 1908 until his accession to the deanery in 1940 he was principal of Trinity College, Carmarthen. During this time he was also a Chaplain to the Forces attached to the South Wales Infantry Brigade.

He died in Haverfordwest, Pembrokeshire, Wales.

Church in Wales titles
Preceded by David Watcyn Morgan	Dean of St Davids; 1940–1949	Succeeded by Carlyle Witton-Davies
