= Edward Talley (priest) =

Welsh Anglican priest in the late 16th and early 17th centuries

Edward Talley was a Welsh Anglican priest in the late 16th and early 17th centuries.

A Cistercian, Talley was educated at the University of Oxford. He held livings at Llangathen and Eglwyscummin. Langford was appointed Archdeacon of Cardigan in 1554.
