= Edward Vaughan (Welsh priest) =

17th-century Welsh Anglican priest

Edward Vaughan was a Welsh Anglican priest in the 17th century.

Owen was born in Caer Gai and educated at Jesus College, Oxford, graduating BA from 1638. Upchurch, Llanynys, Llangar, co. Merioneth, Llanarmon and Mallwyd. He was archdeacon of Cardigan from 1560 to 1563.
