= John Gethin Hughes =

New Zealand military leader (1866–1954)

- Born: 13 March 1866; Bluff, New Zealand
- Died: 23 July 1954 (aged 88); Wellington, New Zealand
- Military career
- Allegiance: New Zealand
- Branch: New Zealand Military Forces
- Rank: Colonel
- Commands: Canterbury Battalion
- Conflicts: Second Boer War; First World War; Gallipoli campaign
- Awards: Companion of the Order of St Michael and St George; Distinguished Service Order mentioned in despatches (2)
- Other work: law clerk

John Gethin Hughes CMG DSO (13 March 1866–23 July 1954) was a New Zealand military leader. Born in Bluff, Southland, New Zealand, he served in the Boer War with the First Contingent of the New Zealand Volunteer Force to be sent to South Africa. During the war he was the first New Zealand recipient of the Distinguished Service Order. After the war he became a professional soldier and served in a number of staff positions in the New Zealand Military Forces. A member of the New Zealand Expeditionary Force during the early stages of the First World War, he commanded the Canterbury Battalion during the Gallipoli campaign. He was eventually evacuated from Gallipoli late in the campaign for medical reasons. He retired from the military in 1917 due to poor health and died in 1954 at the age of 88.

== Early life ==
John Gethin Hughes, the son of a seaman and his wife, was born in Campbelltown, which later became known as Bluff, in the south of New Zealand. After completing his schooling, he gained employment as a law clerk in the town of Timaru. He also served in the local artillery unit of the militia from 1884 to 1887. In 1888, he moved to the town of Napier in the North Island. He served in a local artillery unit there, eventually commanding a battery by 1897.

== South Africa ==
When the Boer War began in 1899, Hughes volunteered for the First Contingent of New Zealanders to serve in the war. The contingent arrived in South Africa in November and Hughes, despite being only a private, was quickly recognised as having good leadership qualities and the following month was promoted to lieutenant. Awarded the Distinguished Service Order (DSO) for his leadership during an engagement in January 1900 at Slingersfontein, where a British camp had come under attack by the Boers, he was the first New Zealander to be so recognised. The citation for his DSO, which was gazetted on 10 April 1901, read: "In recognition of services during the operations in South Africa." A well regarded officer, he was mentioned in despatches before the contingent returned to New Zealand in January 1901.

On his return to New Zealand, Hughes chose to become a professional soldier and was commissioned a captain in the New Zealand Militia. He served as a staff officer to the commandant of the Militia until 1902 when he again volunteered for service in South Africa, embarking with the 10th Contingent. While serving in Natal, he was promoted to major by General Westonhaugh.

== Service in New Zealand ==
When his service in South Africa ended, Hughes resumed his staff duties in New Zealand with the rank of captain. He served in a series of staff positions for the next several years and in 1907, he was promoted to major. In 1910 he transferred to the New Zealand Staff Corps, having received training in England with the British Army. The previous year, he had married Marion De Vere O'Connor.

== First World War ==
When the First World War broke out, Hughes enlisted in the New Zealand Expeditionary Force (NZEF) which was raised for military service abroad. He was appointed assistant military secretary to Major General Alexander Godley, the commander of the NZEF. He embarked for the Middle East with the main body of the NZEF in October 1914. In February, Hughes relinquished his secretarial duties to become NZEF Camp Commandant in Egypt.

While in Egypt, the infantry brigade of the NZEF was combined with an Australian infantry brigade to form the New Zealand and Australian Division with Godley as its commander and intended for service in the Gallipoli Campaign. Hughes landed at Anzac Cove with Godley's headquarters on 25 April 1915. In June, he took command of the Canterbury Battalion when its commander, Lieutenant Colonel Charles Henry Brown, was wounded. He led the battalion during the Battle of Chunuk Bair, which took heavy casualties when it was caught in the open by a Turkish artillery barrage. In October he was medically evacuated due to dysentery. He was recognised for his service at Gallipoli with appointment as a Companion of the Order of St Michael and St George as well as being mentioned in despatches. After a period of convalescence in England he returned in New Zealand where he was eventually discharged from the NZEF because of his health. He was placed on the retirement list in 1917 with the honorary rank of colonel.

== Later life ==
Not long after his return to New Zealand, Hughes was asked to stand as the Member of Parliament for the Wellington North electorate. Following his retirement, he was prominent in the First New Zealand Mounted Rifles Association. He died in Wellington on 23 July 1954 at the age of 88 and was survived by his wife and children.
