= William Strange (priest) =

British Anglican priest (born 1953)

William Anthony Strange (born 1953) is a British Anglican priest. From 2009 to 2019, he was the Archdeacon of Cardigan, and the Vicar of Pencarreg and Llanycrwys in the Diocese of St Davids, Church in Wales. He is an evangelical Anglican, and serves as vice-chair of the Evangelical Fellowship in the Church in Wales (EFCW).
