= Robin Durnford-Slater =

Royal Navy Admiral (1902–1984)

Admiral Sir Robin Durnford-Slater KCB
- Born: Leonard Francis Slater; 9 July 1902; Punjab, British India
- Died: 28 June 1984 (aged 81); Chichester, Sussex, England
- Military career
- Allegiance: United Kingdom
- Branch: Royal Navy
- Service years: 1916–1961
- Rank: Admiral
- Commands: HMS Hermes; HMS Vernon; HMS Gambia; Nore Command
- Conflicts: World War II; Suez Crisis
- Awards: Knight Commander of the Order of the Bath

Admiral Sir Robin Leonard Francis Durnford-Slater KCB (born Leonard Francis Slater; 9 July 1902 – 28 June 1984) was a Royal Navy officer who went on to be the last Commander-in-Chief, The Nore.

== Early life ==
Born as Leonard Francis Slater in 1902 in the Punjab area of India the son of Leonard Slater, a captain in the British Army, and his wife Constance Durnford Slater. His younger brother John became notable as the first British Commando during World War II.

He was educated at Summer Fields School.

== Naval career ==
Durnford-Slater joined the Royal Navy in 1916. He was confirmed in the rank of sub-lieutenant in August 1923, with seniority dated 15 August 1922.

He served in World War II, initially as Executive Officer on the aircraft carrier HMS Hermes which was sunk in 1942. He then joined the torpedo school HMS Vernon. He next became Senior Officer for the 42nd and the 7th Escort Group of Western Approaches Command. Later he became Training Captain on the staff of the Commander-in-Chief, Western Approaches Command and finally Director of Underwater Weapons at the Admiralty.

After the War he became Senior Officer for 1st Escort Flotilla in the Far East Fleet. He went on to be Commandant at the School of Amphibious Warfare and then Captain of the cruiser HMS Gambia. In 1953 he was made Deputy Controller of the Navy. As Flag Officer, Air and Second-in-Command, Mediterranean Fleet he commanded the naval forces, Task Force 345 north of the canal and Task Force 324 south of it from HMS Tyne during the Suez Crisis, Musketeer, in 1956. From 1958, he was the last Commander-in-Chief, The Nore. He retired in April 1961.

Military offices
Preceded by Sir Frederick Parham	Commander-in-Chief, The Nore; 1958–1961	Succeeded by Post abolished
