= William Owen (composer) =

Welsh musician and composer

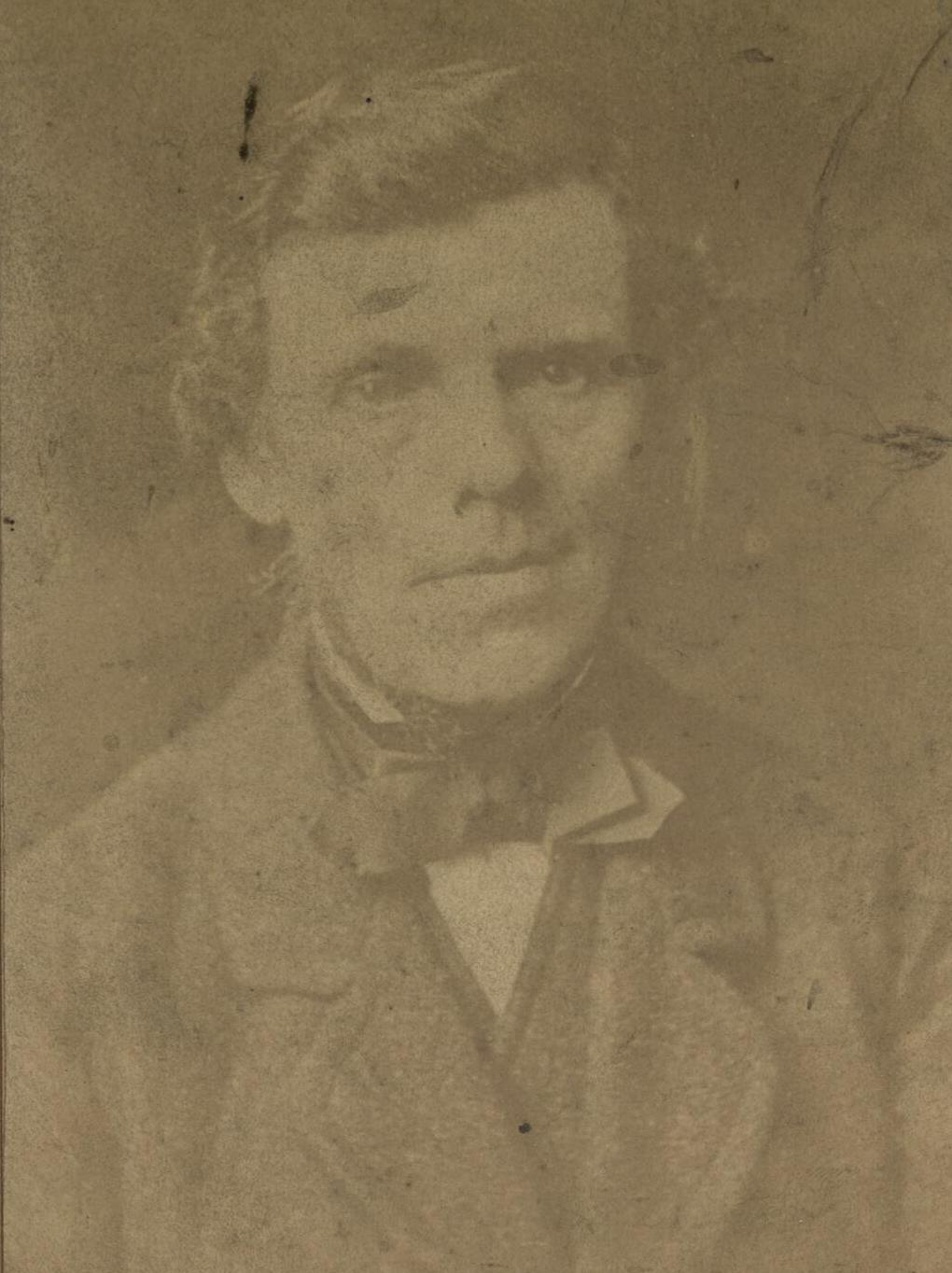
Portrait of Owen c.1875

William Owen, also known by his Welsh name Prysgol, (December 1813 – 20 July 1893) was a Welsh hymn writer. Born at Bangor, he composed the Welsh hymn tune Bryn Calfaria and other works, among his best known being the anthem Ffynnon Ddisglair and the hymns Alma and Deemster.

== Life and career ==
William Owen, widely known in Wales as William Owen Prysgol, was the son of William and Ellen Owen. His father was a stone mason in a quarry. Owen grew up in Bethesda, Gwynedd, where at ten years of age he entered his father's profession. He had music instruction in classes run by Robert Williams at Carneddi, and from William Roberts. He was one of several Welsh hymn writers who had been a member of The Society of Religious Singers in Bethesda during his formative years. (Note: At the age of 18, after composing a new tune as a setting for the words of a well-known hymn, Owen was reportedly told that the need was rather for new words to existing, well-known, tunes.) He later worked at the Dorothea Slate Quarry, and is said to have composed his most famous work, the hymn Bryn Calfaria (Calvary Hill), on slate at his place of work. (Note: Bryn Calfaria was later adapted by Ralph Vaughan Williams as an organ prelude for The English Hymnal.)

Owen was involved with the temperance movement, composing several temperance pieces, some of which were performed at events at Caernarfon Castle. Among his best known works, after Bryn Calfaria, are the anthem Ffynnon Ddisglair (Bright Well) and the hymns Alma and Deemster.

He married a woman from Prysgol, a farmhouse near Caeathro, a few kilometers inland from Caernarfon, where he lived thereafter. He died on 20 July 1893, aged 79, and is buried in Caeathro chapel burial ground.
