= Edward Vaughan (archdeacon of Madras) =

Archdeacon of Madras (1819–1828)

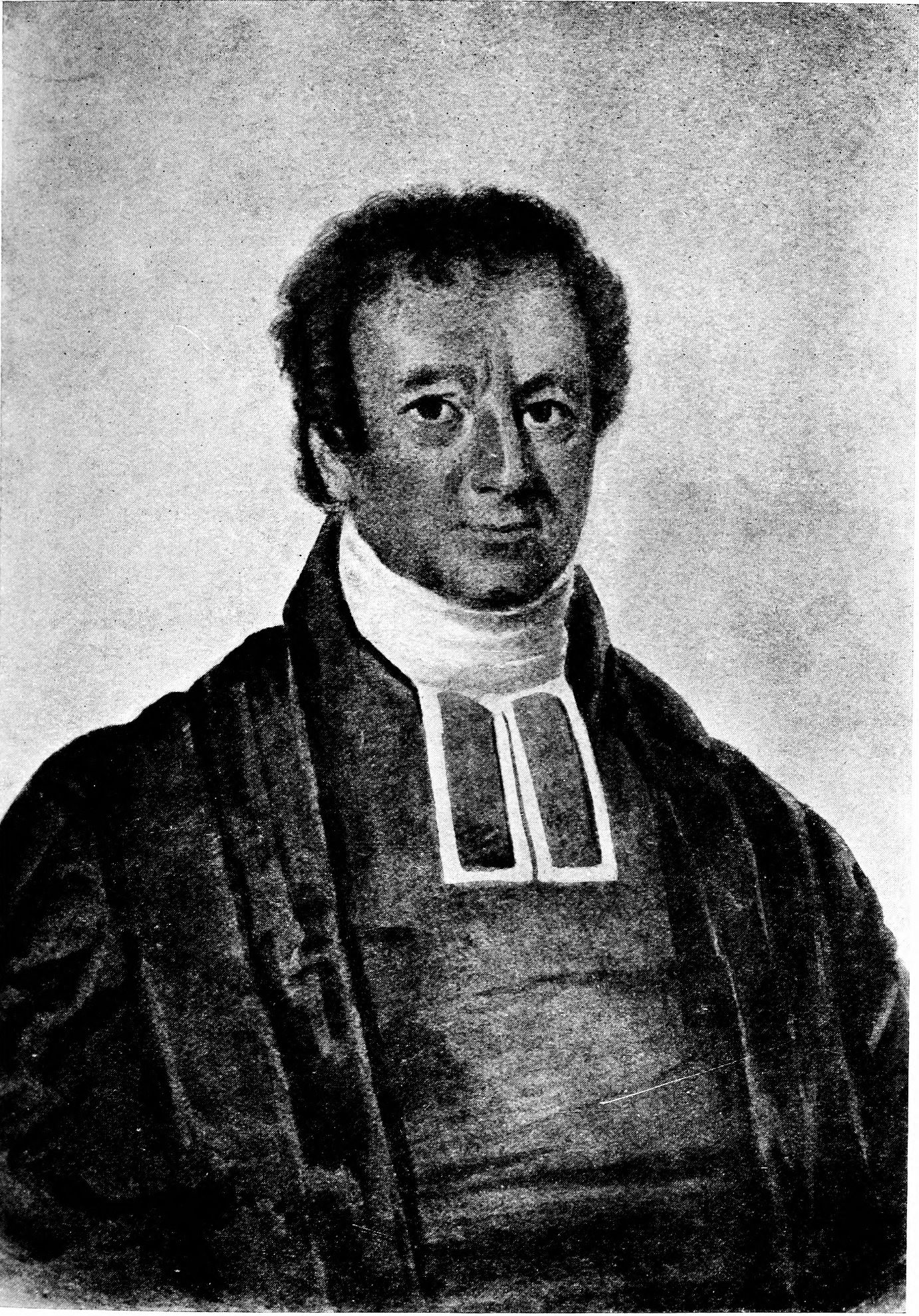
Edward Vaughan

Edward Vaughan (6 July 1776 – 24 February 1849) was an Anglican priest in India in the early 19th century, most notably the second Archdeacon of Madras.

Vaughan was born in Middlesex and educated at Peterhouse, Cambridge. He was a Chaplain with the East India Company from 1799 to 1828; and Archdeacon from 1819 to 1828.
