= John Hughes (priest, 1787–1860) =

Welsh clergyman

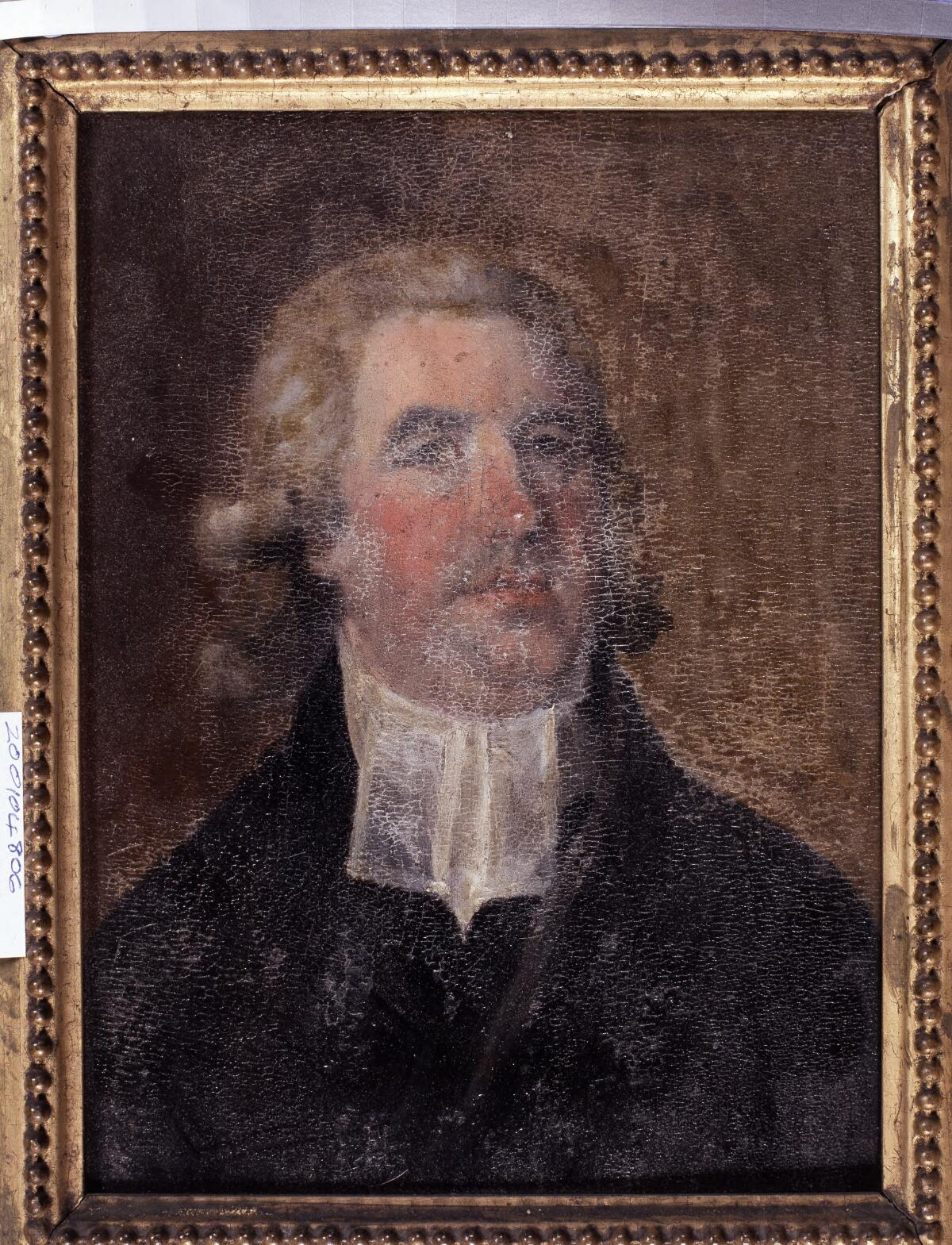
- Born: 1787
- Died: 1 November 1860 (aged 72–73)
- Occupation: Clergyman

John Hughes (1787 – 1 November 1860) was a Welsh clergyman.

== Biography ==
Hughes was the son and heir of John Hughes, esq., of Llwyn Glas, Llanfihangel Geneu'r Glyn, near Aberystwyth. He was born in 1787. After attending the grammar school of Ystradmeurig, he became classical master at a large school at Putney, London, where he remained about eighteen months. As a lad he aspired to become a preacher. Returning to Wales he was ordained by the Bishop of St. Asaph in 1811. He was curate first for six years at Llandrillo yn Rhôs, near Conway, and afterwards at Foleshill, near Coventry. At Foleshill he became very popular; but when the vicar died, in 1822, Lord-chancellor Eldon refused the petition of the parishioners to bestow the living on him. Hughes therefore left, and settled at Tiddington, near Oxford. Here again his fame as a preacher soon filled the church, and students from Oxford were often among his hearers. He became in 1837 vicar of Aberystwyth and curate of Llanbadarn Fawr. In 1834 the living of the mother church of Llanbadarn was conferred on him, with a prebendal stall in the collegiate church of Brecon, and in 1859 Bishop Thirlwall gave him the archdeaconry of Cardigan. In the course of that year he visited eighty parishes, preaching in each. He died on 1 November 1860, aged 73. He was for many years the most popular preacher of the established church in Wales.

He published in Welsh, besides sermons, translations of Henry and Scott's 'Commentary,' as far as Deuteronomy, 1834, of Hall's 'Meditations,' and 'Y Nabl' (i.e. the Psaltery), a collection of Welsh psalms and hymns.

His English publications include, besides sermons:

'The Domestic Ruler's Monitor,' 1821. 'Pastoral Visitation,' 1822. 'Esther and her People,'1832. 'Ruth and her Kindred,' 1839. 'The Self-Searcher.' 'Psalms and Hymns for the use of the Church at Aberystwyth.' 'The Heathen's Appeal. A volume of sermons, with biography by his son, the Rev. R. Hughes, appeared at Liverpool in 1864.
