= St Davids Cathedral =

Cathedral in Pembrokeshire, Wales

Saint Davids Cathedral
- Eglwys Gadeiriol Tyddewi
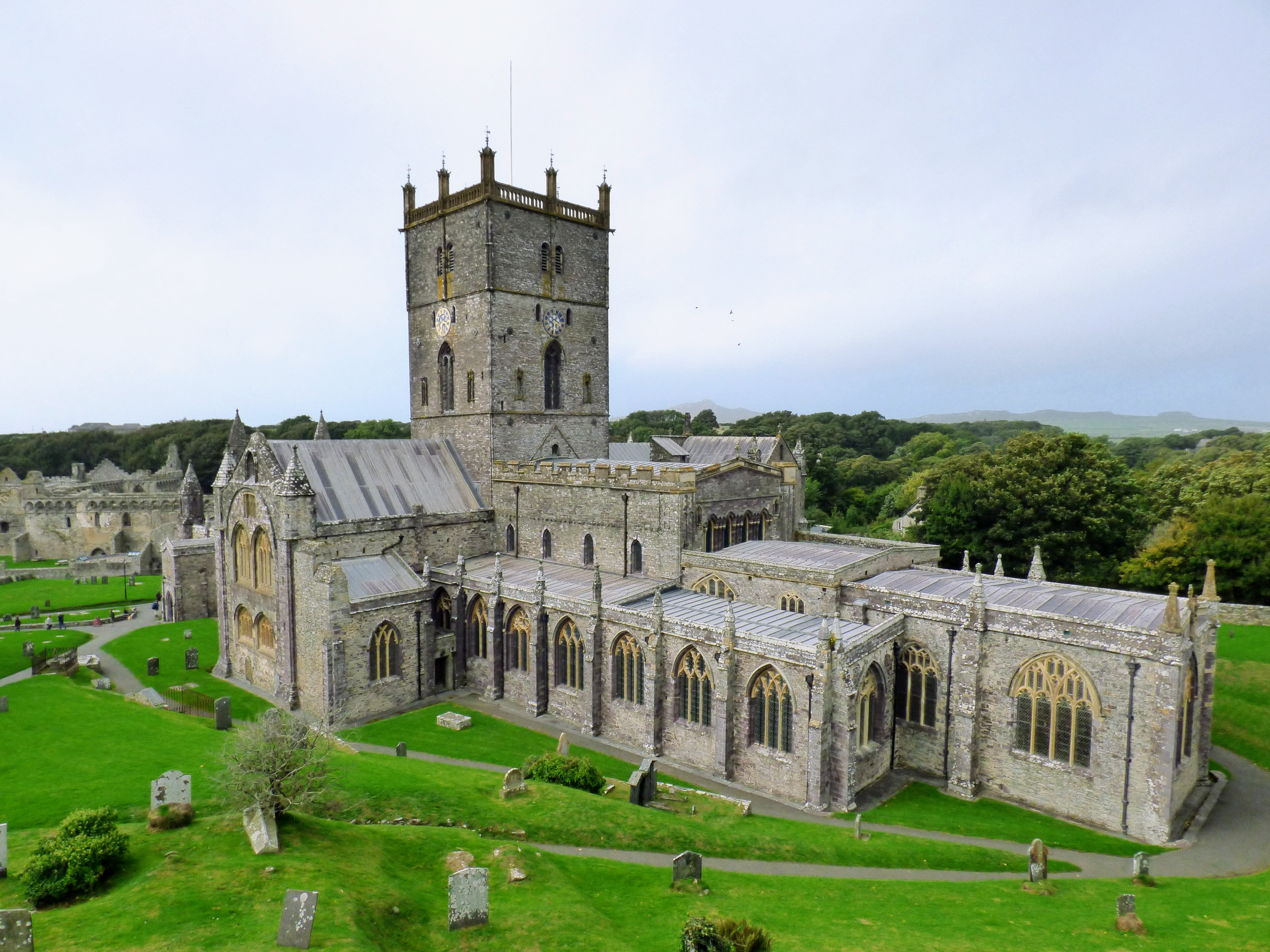
- St Davids Cathedral (September 2018)
- Saint Davids Cathedral
- 51°52′55″N 5°16′06″W
- Location: St Davids, Pembrokeshire
- Country: Wales
- Denomination: Church in Wales
- Previous denomination: Roman Catholic
- Website: www.stdavidscathedral.org.uk

History
- Founded: c. AD 589
- Founder: St David
- Consecrated: 1131

Architecture
- Architect(s): Medieval masons John Nash (18th century); George Gilbert Scott (19th century)
- Style: Romanesque architecture, English Gothic architecture
- Groundbreaking: 1181
- Completed: Mid-13th century

Specifications
- Length: 90 metres (300 ft)
- Height: 35 metres (115 ft)

Administration
- Diocese: St Davids

Clergy
- Bishop: Dorrien Davies
- Dean: Paul Mackness

St Davids Cathedral (Welsh: Eglwys Gadeiriol Tyddewi) is a Church in Wales cathedral situated in St Davids, Britain's smallest city, in the county of Pembrokeshire, near the most westerly point of Wales.

== Early history ==
A monastic community was founded by Saint David, Abbot of Menevia, who died in 589. Between 645 and 1097, the community was attacked many times by raiders, including the Vikings; however it was of such note as both a religious and an intellectual centre that King Alfred summoned help from the monastic community at St Davids in rebuilding the intellectual life of the Kingdom of Wessex. Many of the bishops were murdered by raiders and marauders, including Bishop Moregenau in 999 and Bishop Abraham in 1080. The stone that marked his grave, known as the "Abraham Stone", is intricately carved with early Celtic symbols and is now on permanent display within the Cathedral Exhibition at Porth-y-Tŵr.

In 1081, William the Conqueror visited St Davids to pray, and thus recognised it as a holy and respected place. In 1089, the shrine of David was vandalised and stripped of its precious metals. In 1090, the Welsh scholar Rhigyfarch wrote his Latin Life of David, highlighting David's sanctity, thus beginning the almost cult-like status he achieved.

In 1115, with the area under Norman control, King Henry I of England appointed Bishop Bernard as Bishop of St Davids. He began to improve life within the community, and commenced construction of a new cathedral. In 1123, Pope Calixtus II granted Bishop Bernard's request to bestow a papal privilege upon St Davids, making it a centre of pilgrimage for the Western world; the Pope decreed that "Two pilgrimages to St Davids is equal to one to Rome, and three pilgrimages to one to Jerusalem". The new cathedral was quickly constructed and Bishop Bernard consecrated it in 1131.

Henry II of England's visit in 1171 saw the following of David increase and the need for a larger cathedral. The present cathedral was begun in 1181 and completed not long after. Problems beset the new building and the community in its infancy: the collapse of the new tower in 1220 and earthquake damage in 1247/48.

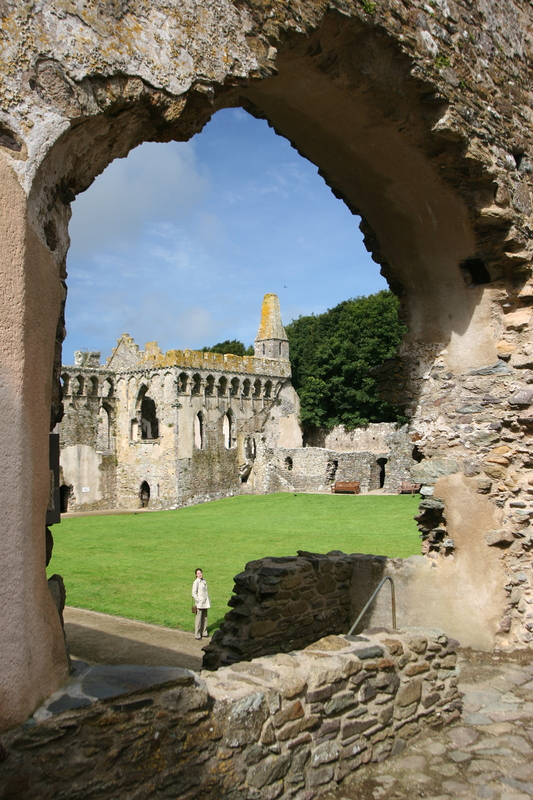
Bishops Palace as it appears today

Under Bishop Gower (1328–1347) the cathedral was modified further, with the rood screen and the Bishops Palace intended as permanent reminders of his episcopacy; the palace is now a picturesque ruin.

In 1365, Bishop Adam Houghton and John of Gaunt began to build St Mary's College and a chantry. He later added the cloister, which connects it to the cathedral.

The episcopacy of Edward Vaughan (1509–1522) saw the building of the Holy Trinity chapel, with its fan vaulting which some say inspired the roof of King's College, Cambridge. This period also saw great developments for the nave, whose roof and Irish oak ceiling were constructed between 1530 and 1540. Bishop Barlow, unlike his predecessor as bishop, wished to suppress the following of David, and stripped St David's shrine of its jewels and confiscated the relics of St David and St Justinian in order to counteract "superstition" in 1538. In 1540, the body of Edmund Tudor, Earl of Richmond and father of Henry VII, was brought to be entombed in front of the high altar from the dissolved Greyfriars' Priory in Carmarthen.

The establishment of the Commonwealth of England under Oliver Cromwell greatly affected many cathedrals and churches, and was particularly felt in St Davids. The cathedral was all but destroyed by Cromwell's forces and the lead was stripped from the Bishops Palace roof.

== Present cathedral ==
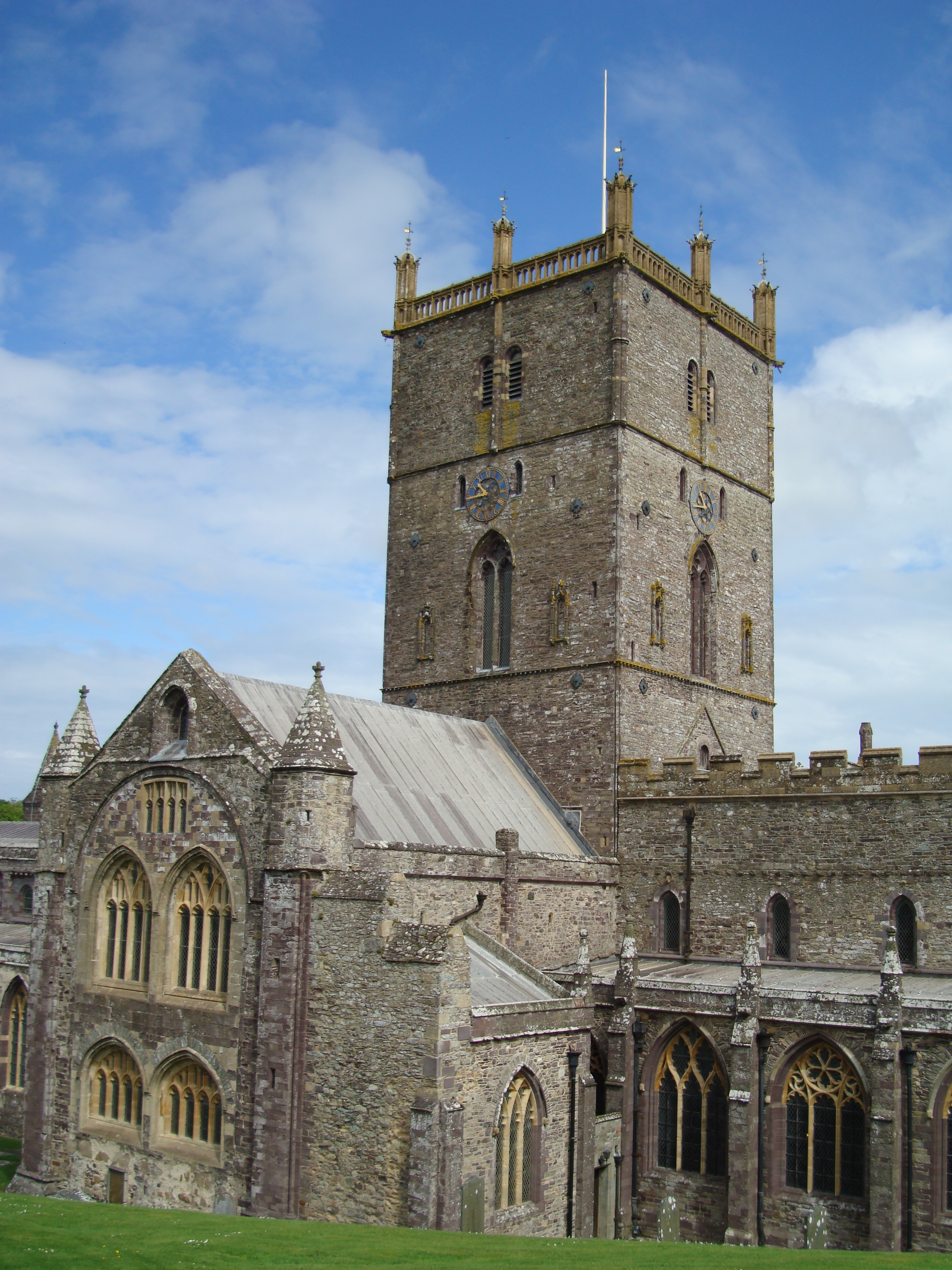
Tower and south transept

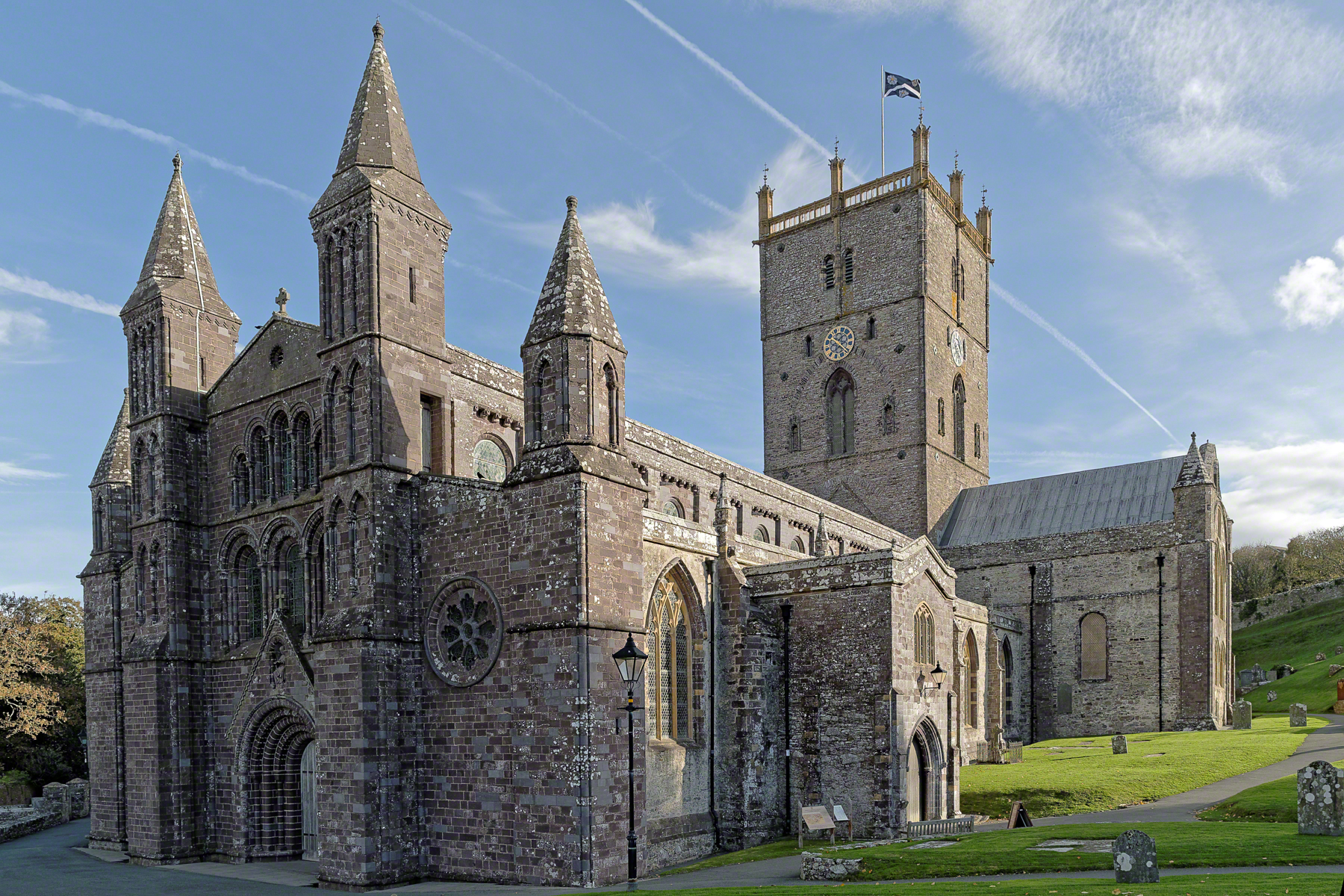
West end, nave south transept and tower flying the dean's flag

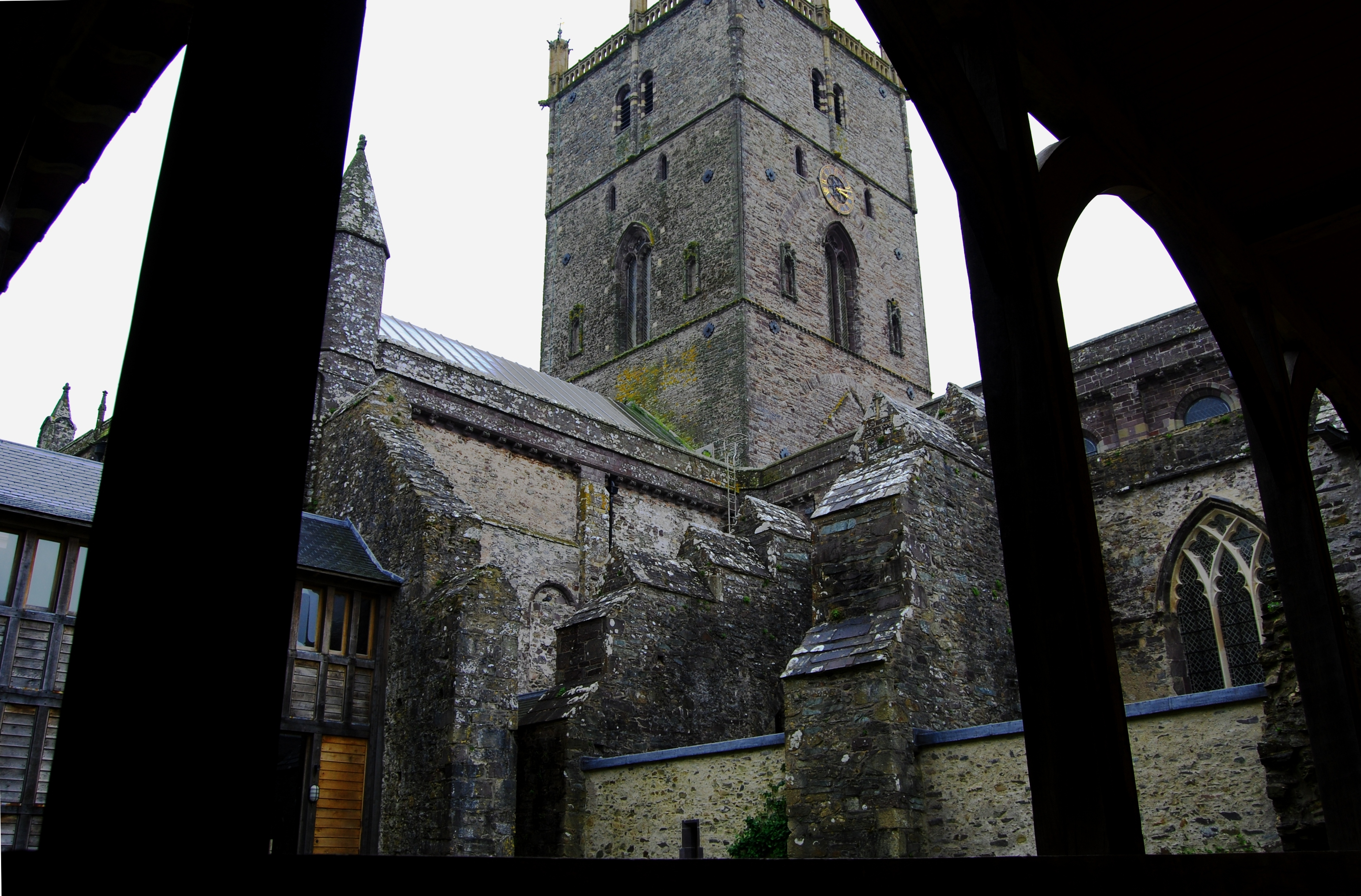
St Davids from renovated cloisters

There is a pronounced slope to the floor of the cathedral, amounting to a height difference of nearly four metres between the east and west ends, and the building is still shifting minutely.

The Welsh architect John Nash was commissioned to restore the west front in 1793 to repair the damage done two hundred years previously. Eclectic in style (with Gothic and Perpendicular characteristics – the latter attributed partly to his destruction of the windows of the chapel of St Mary's College in order to reuse that tracery for his west front), his work soon proved to be substandard (as had his previous work on the chapter house). Within a century the Nash west front had become unstable and the whole building was restored by George Gilbert Scott between 1862 and 1870. The lady chapel was restored by public subscription in 1901 and the eastern chapels were restored through a legacy of the Countess of Maidstone, granddaughter of Bishop John Jenkinson, between 1901 and 1910.

The cathedral suffered the pains of disestablishment in 1920, as did the whole Church in Wales. The diocese was made smaller by the removal of the Archdeaconry of Brecon to form the new Diocese of Swansea and Brecon in 1923. However, this left a large area as a diocese to govern and St Davids began to deteriorate as the centre of the diocese, being nowhere near the centre – the bishop's residence had been at Carmarthen since the 16th century, but administration and the focus moved from the cathedral to the diocese's now largest town.

The 1950s saw the appointment of the Reverend Carl Witton-Davies as dean; appointed in his thirties, his driving vision and energy was short-lived as he was offered what some was believed as a preferment as Archdeacon of Oxford, but did not leave that position for the rest of his service in the church. The cathedral began to have life again and the famous Welsh Youth Pilgrimages to St Davids (Cymry'r Groes) led many to a life of service in the church and provided the Church in Wales with inspired clergy for a decade following. It was Grade I-listed by Cadw in 1951.

The 1960s saw the restoration of St Mary's College as the cathedral hall, for the use of the cathedral parish and for use as an area for art exhibitions and poetry readings. It was dedicated by Archbishop Edwin Morris in 1966 and the inaugural event was a poetry reading by the poet R. S. Thomas, who served as a vicar in the Bangor diocese.

During the 1980s a number of official events in cathedral life took place: in 1981, Charles, Prince of Wales, visited to celebrate the 800th anniversary of the consecration of the cathedral; and on Maundy Thursday 1982, Queen Elizabeth II distributed the Royal Maundy at the cathedral. This was the first occasion that the ceremony had taken place outside England. In 1989–90, the 1,400th anniversary of the death of St David was presided over by the Archbishop of Wales, George Noakes, who was also diocesan Bishop of St Davids.

The decades leading to and immediately following the year 2000 have been the most notable in the cathedral's history since its construction. First, the British Government decided to reinstate the title of "city" to St Davids and this was formally conferred by Queen Elizabeth II on 1 June 1995. The task that lay before the dean, the Very Reverend Wyn Evans, on his appointment in 1994 was huge: a new organ was badly needed and the west front needed extensive restoration. It was also thought to be time for the cathedral to invest in its future by creating a visitor centre within the bell tower, enlarging the peal of bells from eight to ten and by the "reconstruction", or completion, of the cathedral cloisters to house the cathedral choir, vestries, an education suite, rooms for parish use and a refectory as a reminder of the monastic beginnings. The first project was the restoration of the west front, with the original quarry that was used for stone at Caerbwdi Bay being reopened. This phase was completed in 1998, in time for the organ to be dismantled and rebuilt by the organ builders Harrison and Harrison of Durham. The organ was completed in the middle months of 2000 and dedicated on 15 October that year.

The ring of bells was cast by Whitechapel Bell Foundry of London and presented as a gift by the American Friends of St Davids Cathedral. The substantial task of rebuilding the cloisters as an education centre and refectory began in 2003 and was completed in May 2007. The translation of Wyn Evans from dean to bishop led to the appointment of Jonathan Lean as dean in 2009.

The bells are not hung in the central tower of the cathedral but in the old gatehouse, Porth y Twr. There are 10 bells, with the heaviest weighing 24 long cwt 3 qr 25 lb (2,797 lb or 1,269 kg) in D. The back eight bells were cast in 1928 by Mears & Stainbank, London and two trebles added in 2000 cast by Whitechapel Bell Foundry, London. Details of the bells:

Bell	Weight			Note	Diameter		Cast year	Foundry
Bell	long measure	lb	kg	Note	inches	mm	Cast year	Foundry
1	5 long cwt 1 qr 3 lb	591	268	F♯			2000	Whitechapel Bell Foundry
2	5 long cwt 1 qr 23 lb	611	277	E			2000	Whitechapel Bell Foundry
3	5 long cwt 2 qr 22 lb	638	289	D	30.00	762	1928	Mears & Stainbank
4	5 long cwt 3 qr 23 lb	667	303	C♯	31.00	787	1928	Mears & Stainbank
5	7 long cwt 0 qr 13 lb	797	362	B	33.00	838	1928	Mears & Stainbank
6	8 long cwt 2 qr 3 lb	955	433	A	35.75	908	1928	Mears & Stainbank
7	10 long cwt 3 qr 13 lb	1,217	552	G	39.00	991	1928	Mears & Stainbank
8	11 long cwt 2 qr 23 lb	1,311	595	F♯	41.00	1,041	1928	Mears & Stainbank
9	17 long cwt 1 qr 2 lb	1,934	877	E	46.00	1,168	1928	Mears & Stainbank
10	24 long cwt 3 qr 25 lb	2,797	1,269	D	52.00	1,321	1928	Mears & Stainbank

The restored Shrine of St David was unveiled and re-dedicated by the Right Reverend Wyn Evans, Bishop of St Davids, at a Choral Eucharist on St Davids Day 2012.

== Clock ==
The clock was installed by J. B. Joyce & Co of Whitchurch in 1871.

== Cathedral Hall and cloisters ==
St Davids Cathedral Hall stands to the north of the nave and was originally the chapel of St Mary's College. It was restored by Alban Caroe in 1966. The cloister complex lies to the north of the hall and comprises a number of buildings, including Cloister Hall, which were built over the undercrofts of the 14th century St Mary's College. The undercrofts are a Grade I listed building and a Scheduled monument. Cloister Hall which dates from the early 19th century is also Grade I listed, as are an outbuilding and a wall with an inset gateway, both of which lie to the north of the hall. The gateway has a Tudorbethan arch but is likely also 19th century in date. Following an earlier refurbishment of the cloister complex in the 1960s, in 2004 the firm of Caroe & Partners led a major reconstruction. The partnership have been the cathedral's architects since the appointment of the firm's founder, W. D. Caröe, in 1907. The builders were Carreg Construction. The rebuilding provided facilities for meetings, educational and outreach work, retreat spaces and a café.

== Cathedral life ==
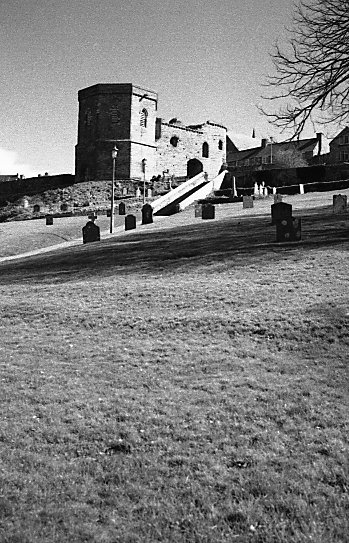
Porth y Twr, viewed from beside the cathedral

There are at least three services said or sung per day, each week, with sung services on five out of seven days.

The cathedral choir at St Davids was the first cathedral choir in the United Kingdom to use girls and men as the main choir, rather than boys and men. (Salisbury Cathedral introduced boys and girls earlier on an equal basis, whereas St Davids uses girls as their "main" cathedral choristers.) There is also a boys' choir whose weekly Evensong is a major event within the cathedral week. They sing with the vicars choral regularly.

The St Davids Cathedral Festival runs through the Whitsun school holiday each year. The week sees performers, both professional and young, play in front of thousands. The cathedral choir serve as a highlight each year, being a very popular concert, as well as the Festival Chorus and Orchestra who perform a major work on the final night of the festival.

== List of deans ==
Before 1840 the senior residentiary cleric was the precentor and not a dean due to a complication during the dissolution of the monasteries. Since 1840 the title "Dean" has been appended to that of Precentor, hence the deans of St Davids are formally the "Dean and Precentor" and their seat being on what is normally regarded in most places the cantoris side, with a stall "in quire" reserved for the bishop.

- 1839–1878 Llewelyn Lewellin (title of Dean granted in 1840)
- 1878–1895 James Allen
- 1895–1897 Owen Phillips
- 1897–1903 David Howell
- 1904–1918 James Allan Smith
- 1919–1930 William Williams
- 1931–1940 David Watcyn Morgan
- 1940–1949 Albert Parry
- 1950–1957 Carlyle Witton-Davies (afterwards Archdeacon of Oxford, 1957)
- 1957–1972 Edward Jenkins
- 1972–1984 Lawrence Bowen
- 1984–1990 Gordon MacWilliam
- 1990–1994 Bertie Lewis
- 1994–2008 Wyn Evans (afterwards Bishop of St Davids)
- 2009–2017 Jonathan Lean
- 2018–2026 Sarah Rowland Jones
- 17th October 2026 - present Paul Mackness

== Local legends ==
Gerald of Wales (Giraldus Cambrensis) in the 13th century relates the strange story of a marble footbridge leading from the church over the Alun rivulet in St Davids. The marble stone was called "Llechllafar" ("the talking stone") because it once spoke when a corpse was carried over it to the cemetery for interment. The effort of speech had caused it to break, despite its size of ten feet in length, six in breadth and one in thickness. This bridge was worn smooth due to its age and the thousands of people who had walked over it, however the superstition was so great that corpses were no longer carried over it. This ancient bridge was replaced in the 16th century and its present whereabouts are not known.

Another legend is that Merlin had prophesied the death on Llechllafar of an English king, conqueror of Ireland, who had been injured by a man with a red hand. King Henry II, whilst on a pilgrimage to Saint Davids, having come over from Ireland, heard of the prophecy and crossed Llechllafar without ill effect. He boasted that Merlin was a liar, to which a bystander replied that the King would not conquer Ireland and was therefore not the king of the prophecy. This turned out to be true, for Henry never did conquer the whole of Ireland.

== Burials ==
- Rhys ap Gruffydd
- Gerald of Wales
- Thomas Fastolf
- Adam Houghton
- Edward Vaughan (bishop)
- Benedict Nichols
- Edmund Tudor, 1st Earl of Richmond (father of Henry VII)

== Organ ==
A specification of the organ can be found on the National Pipe Organ Register.

=== List of organists ===
- 1509 John Norman
- 1563 Thomas Elliot
- c.1570–c.1586 Thomas Tomkins (father of the composer Thomas Tomkins)
- 1713 R. Mordant
- 1714 Henry Mordant
- 1719 Richard Tomkins
- 1719 Williarn Bishop
- 1720 Henry Williams
- 1725 Matthew Maddox
- 1734 Matthew Philpott
- 1793 Arthur Richardson
- 1827 John Barrett
- 1851 William Peregrine Propert
- 1883 Frederick Garton
- 1894 D. John Codner
- 1896 Herbert C. Morris
- 1922 Joseph Soar
- 1953 Peter Boorman
- 1977 Nicholas Jackson
- 1984 Malcolm Watts
- 1990 Kerry Beaumont
- 1995 Geraint Bowen
- 2001 Timothy Noon
- 2007 Alexander Mason
- 2011 Daniel Cook
- 2013 Oliver Waterer
- 2021 Simon Pearce

== In popular culture ==
The cathedral's exterior and overall design were used as the basis of the fictional Nemeton monastery in the video game Koudelka and its sequels Shadow Hearts and Shadow Hearts: Covenant.

== See also ==
- Chapel of St Non – on the coast near St Davids
