= Islwyn (disambiguation) =

Islwyn was one of five local government districts of Gwent from 1974 to 1996.

Islwyn may also refer to:

- Islwyn (given name)

== People ==
=== People with the given name ===
- Islwyn Davies (priest) (1909–1981), British Anglican priest
- Islwyn Davies (1912–1987), Welsh rugby player
- Islwyn Ffowc Elis (1924–2004), Welsh-language writer
- Islwyn Evans (1898–1974), Welsh rugby player
- Islwyn John (1933–2009), Welsh Anglican priest
- Islwyn Jones (born 1935), Welsh footballer
- Islwyn Morris (1920–2011), Welsh-language actor
- Islwyn Watkins (1938–2018), Welsh ceramics artist

=== Other people known as Islwyn ===
- Roy Hughes, Baron Islwyn (1925–2003), British politician
- William Thomas (Islwyn) (1832-1878, bardic name Islwyn), Welsh-language poet and clergyman

== Places ==
- Casnewydd Islwyn, proposed constituency for the Welsh Senedd
- Islwyn (Senedd constituency)
- Islwyn (UK Parliament constituency)
- Mynyddislwyn, former civil parish in Wales
- Newport West and Islwyn, UK parliament constituency in the House of Commons

== Other uses ==
- Islwyn Borough Transport, former Welsh bus operator
