= Anglican liturgy =

Anglican liturgy usually refers to liturgies according the Book of Common Prayer and its derivatives. It may also refer to the following liturgies and liturgical books used by churches and groups in the Anglican Christian tradition:

== Liturgies ==
- The liturgy of the Anglican Communion
- Daily Office (Anglican), the canonical hours within Anglican practice
  - a version of Compline, or night prayer, used by some Anglicans
  - Evensong, a form of Vespers with singing often used by Anglicans
  - Prayer During the Day, a form of midday prayers introduced in the Church of England's Common Worship
- Holy Communion, often also known as Mass, Holy Eucharist, or the Lord's Supper
  - The Holy Eucharist: Rite Two, a version of the Holy Communion celebrated by the General Synod of Hong Kong Sheng Kung Hui
- Anglican Use, a liturgical use based on Anglican tradition as used within the Catholic Church

== Liturgical books ==
- Alternative Service Book, a 1980 transitional liturgical book of the Church of England
- Anglican Missal, an Anglo-Catholic missal
- Anglican Breviary, an Anglo-Catholic breviary
- The Anglican Service Book, a traditional-language revision to the 1979 prayer book
- Book of Alternative Services, a current authorized liturgical book of the Anglican Church of Canada
- Book of Common Prayer, a standard Anglican liturgical book with multiple variations and local revisions
  - Book of Common Prayer (1549), the first edition of the Book of Common Prayer
  - Book of Common Prayer (1552), the first major revision of the Book of Common Prayer
  - Book of Common Prayer (1604), the revision of the Book of Common Prayer under James I
  - Book of Common Prayer (1662), a current authorized liturgical book within the Church of England and other Anglican groups
  - Book of Common Prayer (1928, England), a proposed Church of England revision of the 1662 prayer book
  - Book of Common Prayer (1928, United States), a revision of the Book of Common Prayer by the Episcopal Church in the United States
  - Book of Common Prayer (1929), also known as the 1929 Scottish Prayer Book, a current authorized liturgical book of the Scottish Episcopal Church
  - Book of Common Prayer (1962), a current authorized liturgical book within the Anglican Church of Canada
  - Book of Common Prayer (1979), a current authorized liturgical book within the US-based Episcopal Church
  - Book of Common Prayer (1984), a current authorized liturgical book within the Church in Wales
- Book of Divine Worship, formerly authorized Anglican Use liturgical book within the Catholic Church
- Common Worship, a series of current authorized liturgical books within the Church of England
- Divine Worship: Daily Office, a series of authorized Anglican Use liturgical books within the Catholic Church
- Divine Worship: The Missal, a current authorized Anglican Use liturgical book within the Catholic Church
- Edwardine Ordinals, the first two ordinals authorized by the Church of England

== Related disambiguations ==
- Book of Common Prayer (disambiguation)
