= Islwyn (given name) =

- Gender: Male
- Language: Welsh

Origin
- Meaning: Below the grove

Other names
- See also: Dilwyn, Krislyn, Aelwyn

Islwyn, is a Welsh masculine given name. It means "below the grove." It was associated with a close relationship with the land in ancient Welsh society.

Notable people with the name include:

- Islwyn Davies (priest) (1909–1981), British Anglican priest
- Islwyn Davies (1912–1987), Welsh rugby player
- Islwyn Ffowc Elis (1924–2004), Welsh-language writer
- Islwyn Evans (1898–1974), Welsh rugby player
- Islwyn John (1933–2009), Welsh Anglican priest
- Islwyn Jones (born 1935), Welsh footballer
- Islwyn Morris (1920–2011), Welsh-language actor
- Islwyn Watkins (1938–2018), Welsh ceramics artist

== See also ==
- Borough of Islwyn
- Islwyn (Senedd constituency)
- Islwyn (UK Parliament constituency)
- William Thomas (Islwyn)
