= William James (priest) =

Welsh priest (1832–1896)

William Evan James (15 March 1832 – 7 January 1896) was a Welsh Anglican priest.

James was born in Llandysul, educated at Jesus College, Oxford and ordained in 1856. After a curacy at St Peter's Church, Carmarthen, he was Principal of Carmarthen Trinity College. Later he was Vicar of Abergwili and Prebendary of Caerfarchell in St Davids Cathedral.

Church in Wales titles
Preceded by Archard Williams	Archdeacon of Carmarthen; 1879–1896	Succeeded by Shadrach Pryce
