= Kerry Goulstone =

British priest

Thomas Richard Kerry Goulstone (5 June 1936 – 29 January 2013) was Dean of St Asaph from 1993 to 2001.

Goulstone was born in Llanelli and educated at Llanelli Boys’ Grammar School, St David's College, Lampeter and St Michael's Theological College, Llandaff and ordained in 1960. He began his ordained ministry with curacies in Llanbadarn Fawr and Carmarthen after which he held incumbencies in Solva, Gorslas and Burry Port. His last post before becoming Dean of Asaph was as the Archdeacon of Carmarthen.

Church in Wales titles
Preceded by Bertram Hughes	Archdeacon of Carmarthen; 1991 – 1993	Succeeded by Islwyn John
Preceded by Raymond Renowden	Dean of St Asaph; 1993 – 2001	Succeeded by Chris Potter
