= David Jones (archdeacon of Carmarthen) =

Welsh priest (1874–1950)

David Morgan Jones (28 December 1874 – 19 September 1950) was Archdeacon of Carmarthen from 1938 until 1949.

Pugh was educated at Llandovery College, St David's College, Lampeter, and St. Michael's College, Llandaff, and ordained in 1900. After curacies in Llangyfelach and Swansea he held incumbencies in Aberporth, Cardigan, Llanelly and Llanddowror.

Church in Wales titles
Preceded by Robert Williams	Archdeacon of Carmarthen; 1938–1949	Succeeded by John Richards Pugh
