= Thomas Evans (archdeacon of Carmarthen) =

Welsh priest (1914–1982)

Thomas John Evans was Archdeacon of Carmarthen from 1974 until his death in 1982.

Evans was born in 1914, educated at St David's College, Lampeter, and ordained in 1944. After curacies in Dafen and Llanelly he was Vicar of Llangunnor until his Archdeacon’s appointment.

Church in Wales titles
Preceded by John Owen Jenkins	Archdeacon of Carmarthen; 1974–1982	Succeeded by Roy Thomas Davies
