= Roy Davies (bishop) =

Welsh Anglican bishop (1934–2013)

The Right Reverend Roy Davies
- Bishop of Llandaff
- Diocese: Diocese of Llandaff
- In office: 1985-1999
- Predecessor: John Poole-Hughes
- Successor: Barry Morgan
- Other post: Archdeacon of Carmarthen (1982-85)

Personal details
- Born: Roy Thomas Davies; 31 January 1934 Llangennech, Carmarthenshire, Wales
- Died: 7 August 2013 (aged 79)
- Denomination: Anglicanism

Roy Thomas Davies (31 January 1934 – 7 August 2013) was a Welsh Anglican clergyman, who served as Bishop of Llandaff from 1985 to 1999.

== Life ==
Davies was educated at St David's College, Lampeter, Wales, obtaining a BA degree in 1955, and then at Jesus College, Oxford, where he obtained a BLitt in 1959. He trained for ordination at St Stephen's House, Oxford. He was ordained deacon in 1959, and ordained priest in 1960, serving as assistant curate of Llanelli, Saint Paul from 1959 to 1964. He was then vicar of Llanafan y Trawsgoed from 1964 to 1967 before working as chaplain to Anglican students at the University College of Wales, Aberystwyth from 1967 to 1973. After being secretary of the Provincial Council for Mission and Unity of the Church in Wales from 1973 to 1979, he became vicar of St David's, Carmarthen from 1979 to 1983. He was appointed Archdeacon of Carmarthen in 1982, and vicar of Llanegwad in 1983. He was clerical secretary of the Governing Body of the Church in Wales from 1983 until his appointment as Bishop of Llandaff in 1985. He retired in 1999. Davies died unmarried on 7 August, 2013.

== Personal views ==
On the divisive issue of the ordination of women priests Davies agreed to a moratorium which he maintained throughout his episcopate. Privately he expressed himself opposed to women's ordination in the earlier stages of the debate, but later changed his mind and became a supporter of the ordination of women as deacons and as priests.

Bishop Davies supported the use of both English and Welsh liturgy in the Church, and was himself fluent in both languages. He had studied Welsh as the subject of his undergraduate degree at Lampeter.

Church in Wales titles
| Preceded by Thomas Evans | Archdeacon of Carmarthen; 1982–1985 | Succeeded by Bertram Hughes |
| Preceded by John Poole-Hughes | Bishop of Llandaff; 1985–1999 | Succeeded by Barry Morgan |
