= Saunders Davies =

Anglican bishop (1937–2018)

Francis James Saunders Davies (30 December 1937 – 30 March 2018) was the Anglican Bishop of Bangor from 2000 until 2004.

== Early life ==
Davies was educated at the University College of North Wales and Selwyn College, Cambridge.

== Professional career ==
Ordained in 1964, he began his ministry as a curate at Holyhead before being appointed a minor canon of Bangor Cathedral. From 1969 to 1975, he was Rector at Llanllyfni, Canon Missioner of Bangor until 1979 then Vicar of Gorseinon and rural dean from 1983.

He was Vicar of Eglwys Dewi Sant Caerdydd (Cardiff) between 1986 and 1993. He became the Archdeacon of Meirionnydd in 1993 before his ordination to the episcopate in January 2000.

== Personal life and death ==
He retired in 2004 and died on 30 March 2018.

Church in Wales titles
Preceded by Barry Morgan	Bishop of Bangor; 2000–2004	Succeeded by Anthony Crockett
