= David Lewis (archdeacon of Carmarthen) =

British priest (1839–1901)

David Lewis (1839–1901) was a British Anglican priest who was the Archdeacon of Carmarthen from 1899 to 1901.

== Biography ==
Lewis was born on 13 January 1839. He graduated in 1862 from Emmanuel College, Cambridge, and was admitted a deacon in 1863 by Connop Thirlwall, Bishop of St David's. He became a priest in 1864, and worked as curate of Aberystwyth until 1865, when Thirlwall appointed him to the vicarage of Llandygwydd, Cardiganshire. In 1874, he was nominated to the vicarage of Llandewi Velfry and the rectory of Crinow, Pembrokeshire, which he held together for two years.

He was appointed vicar of St Davids in 1876, as the preferred candidate of the dean and chapter of St David's Cathedral. In the same year, the bishop made him a canon and treasurer of the cathedral and prebendary of Llandissilio-Gogoff. He was proctor in convocation from 1895 to 1899 and rural dean of Dewisland from 1897 to 1899.

In 1899, he was appointed Archdeacon of Carmarthen by John Owen, Bishop of St David's, and received the prebendal stall of Llanrhian in St David's Cathedral. He also accepted the vicarage of Llanfihangel Aberbythych (and his estate Golden Grove) offered by the Earl Cawdor.

He died at Eastbourne on 16 December 1901.

Anglican Communion titles
Preceded by Shadrach Pryce	Archdeacon of Carmarthen; 1899–1901	Succeeded by Owen Evans
