= Bertram Hughes =

British archdeacon (1925–2012)

Evan Arthur Bertram Hughes (11 July 1925 – 22 December 2012) was Archdeacon of Carmarthen from 1985 until 1991.

Hughes was educated at St David's College, Lampeter and ordained in 1950. After curacies in Abergwili and Llanelly, he became a CMS missionary in India. He was Archdeacon of Bhagalpur from 1965 to 1966; and then of Patna from 1966 to 1969. He was Vicar of Johnston from 1974 until 1980 and then of Newcastle Emlyn until his Archdeacon’s appointment.

Church in Wales titles
Preceded by Roy Thomas Davies	Archdeacon of Carmarthen; 1985–1991	Succeeded by Philip Anthony Crockett
