= Alun Evans (priest) =

Welsh Anglican priest (born 1947)

Alun Wyn Evans (b 1947) is a Welsh Anglican priest.

Evans was educated at Downing College, Cambridge and Ripon College Cuddesdon. He was ordained deacon in 1972, and priest in 1973. After curacies at Bargoed and Coity he held incumbencies in Cwmafan, Llangynwyd, Cardiff and Swansea. He was the Archdeacon of Carmarthen from 2004 to 2012.

Church in Wales titles
Preceded by Anthony Crockett	Archdeacon of Carmarthen; 2004–2012	Succeeded by Roger Hughes
