= Ungoed Jacob =

British priest (1910–1990)

William Ungoed Jacob (6 October 1910 – 18 December 1990) was an eminent Anglican priest and author in the 20th century.

He was born on 6 October 1910, and educated at Llandovery College and Jesus College, Oxford. He trained for ordination at Wycliffe Hall, Oxford and was ordained deacon in 1934 and priest in 1935. After curacies in Aberystwyth and Lampeter he held incumbencies at Blaenau Ffestiniog and Hubberston after which he was Archdeacon of Carmarthen and then Dean of Brecon.

Church in Wales titles
Preceded by John Pugh	Archdeacon of Carmarthen; 1960–1967	Succeeded by Owen Jenkins
Preceded by Gwynno James	Dean of Brecon; 1967–1978	Succeeded by Alwyn Rice Jones
