= Eifion Evans =

Eifion Evans may refer to:

- Eifion Evans (Archdeacon of Cardigan) (1911–1997)
- Eifion Evans (church historian) (1931–2017)
