= John Pugh (priest) =

British archdeacon (1885–1961)

John Richards Pugh (18 May 1885 – 4 December 1961) was Archdeacon of Carmarthen from 1950 until 1960.

Pugh was educated at St David's College, Lampeter and ordained in 1908. After curacies in Penygraig, Llanwonno and Nantymoel he held incumbencies in Llwynypia, Merthyr Tydfil and Carmarthen. He was a Canon Residentiary at St David's Cathedral from 1948.

Church in Wales titles
Preceded by David Jones	Archdeacon of Carmarthen; 1950–1960	Succeeded by Ungoed Jacob
