= Andy John =

British bishop

The Right Reverend Andy John
- Archbishop of Wales
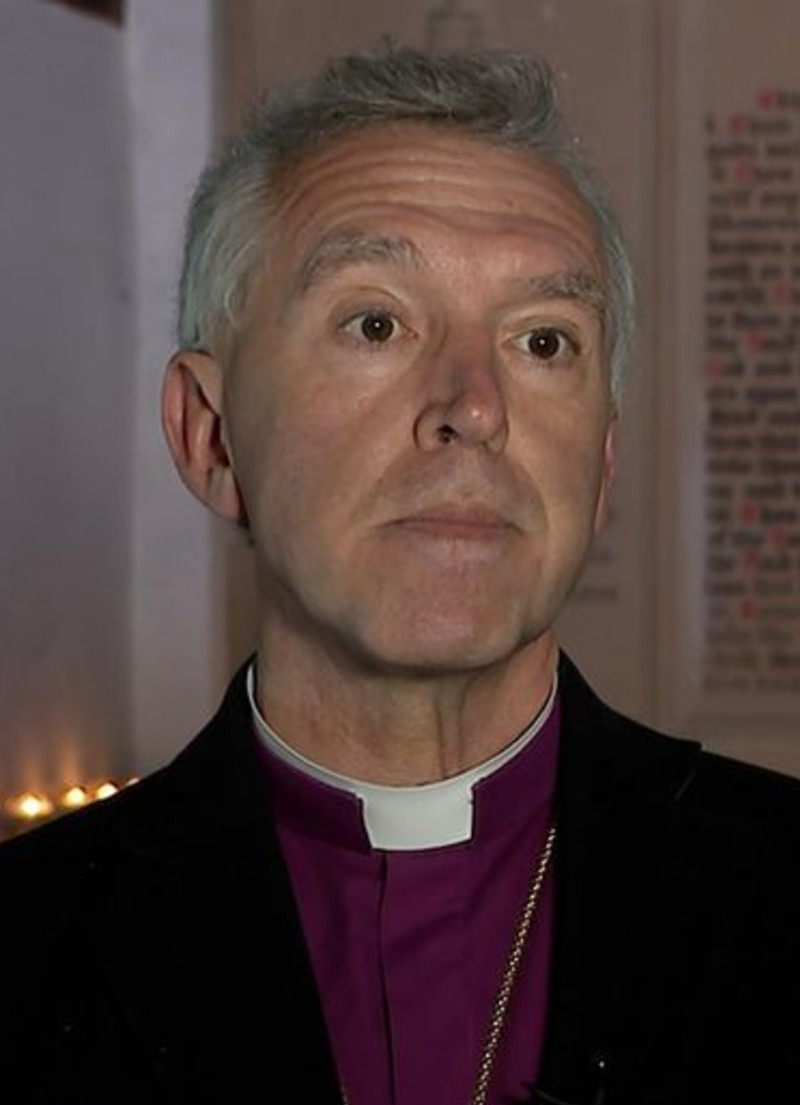
- John in 2023
- Church: Church in Wales
- Province: Church in Wales
- Diocese: Diocese of Bangor
- Installed: 6 December 2021
- Term ended: 27 June 2025
- Predecessor: John Davies
- Successor: Cherry Vann
- Other post: Bishop of Bangor (2008–2025)

Orders
- Ordination: 1 July 1989 (deacon); 30 June 1990 (priest) by George Noakes
- Consecration: 29 November 2008 by Barry Morgan

Personal details
- Born: Andrew Thomas Griffith John; 9 January 1964 (age 62)
- Denomination: Anglicanism
- Education: University of Nottingham; St John's College, Nottingham

Andrew Thomas Griffith John (born 9 January 1964) is a retired Welsh Anglican bishop. He served as Bishop of Bangor from 2008 to 2025, and also as Archbishop of Wales, the head of the Church in Wales, from 2021 to 2025.

== Early life ==
A native of Aberystwyth, John was educated at Ysgol Penglais School, a comprehensive school in the town. He is a fluent Welsh speaker.

John went on to study law at the University of Wales, Cardiff. After graduating in 1986, he studied theology at the University of Nottingham, graduating in 1988, followed by a diploma in pastoral studies at St John's College, Nottingham in 1989.

== Ordained ministry ==
He was ordained deacon in the Diocese of St Davids and a priest at Petertide 1990 (on 30 June at St Davids Cathedral by George Noakes, Bishop of St Davids and Archbishop of Wales). Until his election as Bishop of Bangor, all his ministry was in the Diocese of St Davids. Initially he was curate for Cardigan, Y Ferwig and Mwnt from 1989 to 1991 and then in Aberystwyth from 1991 to 1992. He was a vicar in the Rectorial Benefice of Aberystwyth from 1992 to 1999. From 1999 he was vicar of Henfynyw with Aberaeron and Llanddewi Aberarth, to which was added Llanbadarn Trefeglwys in 2005. In 2006 he was appointed vicar of Pencarreg and Llanycrwys and the Archdeacon of Cardigan.

=== Episcopal ministry ===
John was elected Bishop of Bangor on 9 October 2008 and was consecrated in Llandaff Cathedral on 29 November 2008, along with the new Bishop of St Davids, Wyn Evans. He was enthroned in Bangor Cathedral on 24 January 2009.

On 6 December 2021, John was elected as Archbishop of Wales (remaining Bishop of Bangor) by an electoral college of the Church in Wales meeting at Holy Trinity Church, Llandrindod Wells; his election was confirmed and therefore he legally immediately took up the archiepiscopal see. He was formally enthroned as Archbishop of Wales on 30 April 2022. He was honoured as a member of Gorsedd Cymru in 2023 as were two previous archbishops of Wales, Barry Morgan and Rowan Williams.

On 19th Jan 2024, John announced his new Assistant Bishop David Morris.

On 27 June 2025, John unexpectedly announced his immediate retirement as Archbishop of Wales and Bishop of Bangor effective 31 August 2025. This followed the publication of two reports critical of behaviour at Bangor Cathedral, where it was found that "sexual boundaries seemed blurred" and also that alcohol had been consumed to excess. Although John was not himself criticised for these failings, he apologised to those who had been hurt or let down. There were also allegations of financial mismanagement involving diocesan charities. After meeting with John, the Representative Body of the Church in Wales issued several recommendations to the diocese and the cathedral ending with a declaration of no confidence in the leadership at the diocese.

== Views ==
Archbishop John identifies himself with the Evangelical tradition of Anglicanism. Some of his actions and views also align with Anglo-Catholicism and with liberalism.

== Personal life ==
John and his first wife, the Reverend Caroline John, have four children. Following their divorce, he remarried.

Church in Wales titles
Preceded by Anthony Crockett	Bishop of Bangor; 2008–present	Incumbent
Preceded by John Davies	Archbishop of Wales; 2021–2025	Succeeded by Cherry Vann
