= Roger Hughes (priest) =

Welsh priest

(William) Roger Hughes was a Welsh Anglican priest, most notably Archdeacon of Carmarthen from 2012 to 2017.

Church in Wales titles
Preceded by Alun Evans	Archdeacon of Carmarthen; 2012-2017	Succeeded by Dorrien Davies
