= Owen Jenkins (priest) =

British archdeacon (1906–1988)

(John) Owen Jenkins (13 June 1906 – 9 August 1988) was a Welsh Anglican priest.

Jenkins was educated at St David's College, Lampeter and Jesus College, Oxford; and ordained in 1930. After curacies in Cwmamman and Carmarthen he held incumbencies at Spittal, Llangadog, Newport and Llanfihangel Aberbythych. He was Archdeacon of Cardigan from 1962 until 1967; and then of Carmarthen from 1967 until 1974.

Church in Wales titles
Preceded by Richard Ward	Archdeacon of Cardigan; 1962–1967	Succeeded by Eifion Evans
Preceded by Ungoed Jacob	Archdeacon of Carmarthen; 1967–1974	Succeeded by Thomas Evans
