= Anthony Crockett (bishop) =

Welsh Anglican bishop (1945–2008)

The Right Reverend Anthony Crockett
- Bishop of Bangor
- Church: Church in Wales
- Diocese: Diocese of Bangor
- In office: 2004 to 2008
- Predecessor: Saunders Davies
- Successor: Andy John

Orders
- Ordination: 1971 (deacon); 1972 (priest)
- Consecration: 2004

Personal details
- Born: Phillip Anthony Crockett; 23 August 1945
- Died: 30 June 2008 (aged 62)
- Denomination: Anglicanism
- Profession: Clergyman
- Education: Pontypridd County Grammar School
- Alma mater: King's College London; St Michael's College, Llandaff

Phillip Anthony "Tony" Crockett (23 August 1945 – 30 June 2008) was a Welsh Anglican bishop. He was the Bishop of Bangor from 2004 until his death from prostate cancer in 2008.

== Early life and education ==
Crockett was born on 23 August 1945. He was educated at Pontypridd County Grammar School, an all-boys state grammar school in Pontypridd. He studied classics at King's College London, graduating with a Bachelor of Arts (BA) degree in 1967. He remained at King's to study theology in preparation for ordination, completing a Bachelor of Divinity (BD) degree and the Associateship of King's College (AKC) qualification in 1970. He then underwent a year of training at St Michael's College, Llandaff, an Anglican theological college in Wales, leaving in 1971 to be ordained.

== Ordained ministry ==
Crockett was ordained in the Church in Wales as a deacon in 1971 and as a priest in 1972. He was a curate at Aberdare and Whitchurch (Cardiff). From 1978 to 1986 he was Vicar of Llanafan y Trawsgoed then from 1986 Rector of Dowlais before serving eight years as the Secretary of the Board of Ministry of the Church in Wales. A fluent Welsh speaker, his final post before his ordination to the episcopate was as Archdeacon of Carmarthen (1999-2004).

In 2004, Crockett became the Bishop of Bangor.

== Personal life ==
Crockett was the first divorced person in the United Kingdom to be appointed as a bishop in a mainstream church, amidst some controversy. In 1985 he separated from his first wife, with whom he had three children. He married Caroline Ann Owen (born 1959) in 1999 and also ordained her in 2006.

Church in Wales titles
Preceded by Islwyn John	Archdeacon of Carmarthen; 1999–2004	Succeeded by Alun Evans
Preceded by Saunders Davies	Bishop of Bangor; 2004–2008	Succeeded by Andy John
