= Book of Common Prayer (disambiguation) =

Book of Common Prayer is the name given to a number of related prayer books used in the Anglican Communion.

Book of Common Prayer may also refer to:

== Liturgical books ==
- Book of Common Prayer (1549), the first Book of Common Prayer
- Book of Common Prayer (1552), the second Book of Common Prayer
- Book of Common Prayer (1559), the third Book of Common Prayer
- Book of Common Prayer (1604), the fourth Book of Common Prayer
- Book of Common Prayer (1637), an abortive effort to reintroduce the Book of Common Prayer in the Church of Scotland
- Book of Common Prayer (1662), an authorised liturgical book of the Church of England and the basis for numerous other editions of the Book of Common Prayer
- Book of Common Prayer (1928, England), an official and partially authorised revised version of the 1662 Book of Common Prayer of the Church of England
- Book of Common Prayer (1928, United States), an authorised liturgical book of the U.S. Episcopal Church in use with some Continuing Anglican bodies
- Book of Common Prayer (1929), commonly known as the Scottish Prayer Book, an official liturgical book of the Scottish Episcopal Church
- Book of Common Prayer (1962), an authorized liturgical book of the Anglican Church of Canada
- Book of Common Prayer (1979), the official primary liturgical book of the U.S.-based Episcopal Church
- Book of Common Prayer (1984), an authorised liturgical book of the Church in Wales
- Book of Common Prayer (2019), the official primary liturgical book of the U.S.-based Anglican Church in North America
- Book of Common Prayer (Unitarian), revisions of the 1662 prayer book according to Unitarian theology

== Printings ==
- Book of Common Prayer (1843 illustrated version), an illustrated version of the 1790 edition Book of Common Prayer of the American Episcopal Church
- Book of Common Prayer (1845 illuminated version), an illuminated and illustrated version of the 1662 Book of Common Prayer for the use of the United Church of England and Ireland

== Other uses ==
- A Book of Common Prayer, a 1977 novel by Joan Didion

== See also ==
- Common Prayer (band), an American indie rock band
- Custodian of the Standard Book of Common Prayer, an office with canonical responsibilities in churches of North American Anglicanism
