= Cherry Vann =

British Anglican bishop (born 1958)

The Most Reverend Cherry Vann
- Archbishop of Wales
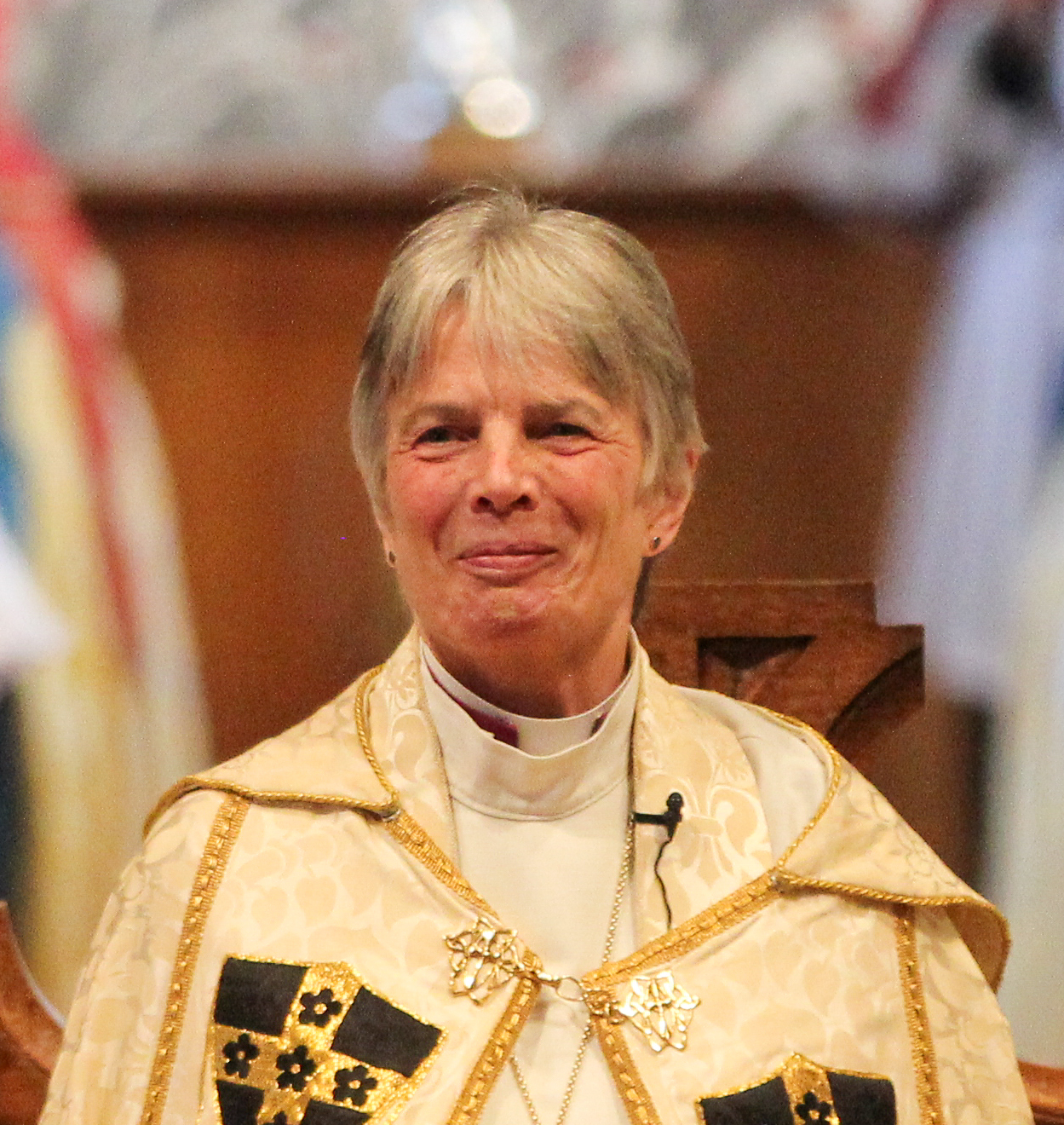
- Vann at her enthronement as Archbishop of Wales, 2025
- Church: Church in Wales
- Diocese: Monmouth
- Elected: 30 July 2025
- Predecessor: Andy John
- Other post: Bishop of Monmouth (2020–present)
- Previous post: Archdeacon of Rochdale (2008–2020)

Orders
- Ordination: 1989 (deacon); 1994 (priest)
- Consecration: 25 January 2020 by John Davies

Personal details
- Born: Cherry Elizabeth Vann; 29 October 1958 (age 67) Whetstone, Leicestershire, England
- Denomination: Anglicanism
- Partner: Wendy Diamond
- Education: Royal College of Music; Westcott House, Cambridge

Cherry Elizabeth Vann (born 29 October 1958) is a British Anglican bishop serving in the Church in Wales as Archbishop of Wales since 2025 and Bishop of Monmouth since 2020. She is the first woman to be elected as an Anglican archbishop in the United Kingdom and the first openly gay and partnered bishop to serve as a primate in the Anglican Communion. Before joining the Church in Wales, she had spent her entire ordained ministry in the Church of England's Diocese of Manchester and was Archdeacon of Rochdale in the diocese from 2008 to 2020.

== Early life and education ==
Vann was born on 29 October 1958 in Whetstone, Leicestershire, England. She studied piano and violin at the Royal College of Music, becoming an Associate of the Royal College of Music (ARCM) diploma in 1978 and a Graduate of the Royal Schools of Music (GRSM) graduate in 1980. The GRSM was, from 1977, an honours degree for the purpose of teacher training.

In 1986, Vann entered Westcott House, Cambridge, an Anglican theological college, where she studied theology and trained for ordination for three years.

== Ordained ministry ==
Vann was ordained in the Church of England, being made deacon at Petertide 1989 (2 July) by Christopher Mayfield, Bishop of Manchester, at Manchester Cathedral. She was parish deacon at St Michael's Church, Flixton, from 1989 to 1992 and St Peter's Church, Bolton, from 1992 to 1994. On 23 April 1994, she was one of the first five women to be ordained to the priesthood in the Diocese of Manchester during a service held at her church (i.e. St Peter's Church, Bolton) led by David Bonser, Bishop of Bolton. This was the first year that women were ordained to the priesthood in the Church of England. She remained there, from 1994 to 1998, as an assistant curate. Additionally, she was a chaplain at the Bolton Institute of Higher Education from 1992 to 1998.

From 1998 to 2004, Vann was chaplain for deaf people in Manchester, and a part-time team vicar of the East Farnworth and Kearsley team ministry. She was then the incumbent of the team ministry, as team rector, from 2004 to 2008. She was also area dean of Farnworth from 2005 to 2008. In 2007, she became an honorary canon of Manchester Cathedral.

In May 2008, Venn was announced as the next Archdeacon of Rochdale. In September 2008, she took up the appointment, having been installed as archdeacon during a service at Manchester Cathedral. She was the first woman to become a senior priest (either an archdeacon or a dean) in the Diocese of Manchester.

In February 2013, Vann was elected prolocutor of the Lower House of the Convocation of York. As such, she was also an ex-officio member of the Archbishops' Council. In January 2016, she was re-elected, having stood unopposed.

=== Episcopal ministry ===
On 19 September 2019, Vann was elected the next Bishop of Monmouth in the Church in Wales. She was bishop-elect until her election as diocesan bishop was confirmed by the bench of bishops at a synod on 5 January 2020 (by which she legally took possession of the see); she was then consecrated as a bishop at Brecon Cathedral on 25 January and was enthroned as the 11th Bishop of Monmouth at Newport Cathedral on 1 February 2020. Vann was the third woman to become a bishop in the Church of Wales, following Joanna Penberthy and June Osborne who were consecrated in 2017.

Since 2021, Vann is a patron of the Open Table Network, an ecumenical Christian community for LGBT people and their allies.

On 30 July 2025, Vann was announced as the new Archbishop of Wales, having received the required two-thirds majority of votes on the second day of the meeting of the electoral college at Chepstow. In addition to heading the Church in Wales as its archbishop, she remains the Bishop of Monmouth. Vann's enthronement as the 15th Archbishop of Wales was held at Newport Cathedral on 8 November 2025.

== Personal life ==
Vann lives with her civil partner, Wendy Diamond. The Church in Wales allows clergy to be in same-sex civil partnerships.

Church of England titles
Preceded by Mark Davies	Archdeacon of Rochdale; 2008–2020	Succeeded by David Sharples
Church in Wales titles
Preceded by Richard Pain	Bishop of Monmouth; 2020–present	Incumbent
Preceded by Andy John	Archbishop of Wales; 2025–present	Incumbent
