= List of Archdeacons of Carmarthen =

This is a list of archdeacons of Carmarthen. The Archdeacon of Carmarthen is the priest in charge of the archdeaconry of Carmarthen, an administrative division of the Church in Wales Diocese of St Davids. The archdeaconry comprises the five deaneries of Carmarthen, Cydweli, Dyffryn Aman, Llangadog/Llandeilo and St Clears.

== List of Archdeacons of Carmarthen ==
- ?1115, ?1121 William
- 1328, 1330 Walter Winter
- 1355 Gruffudd Caunton
- 1356–? Hywel Fychan
- 1357–? David Martin of Rosemarket
- 1359–? John Clyewe
- 1368 William Baldwin
- 1383, 1389 William Nicholls
- 1386 John David
- 1391 Edmund Warham
- ?–1404 John Walton
- 1404–? Adam de Usk
- 1408–? William Chichele
- 1412–? William Newport
- 1432, 1439 William Pirrye
- ?–1488 Richard Keyr
- 1488–1494 John Morgan or Young (afterwards Bishop of St Davids, 1496)
- 1494-1509 Henry ap Hywel
- 1509–? Edward ap John
- 1535 Gruffudd Leyshon
- c.1543–? John Barlow
- 1549–1553? George Constantine
- 1554–1583 Gruffudd Leyshon
- 1583–? Meredith Morgan
- 1616–>1640 William Beeley
- William Beale
- 1643–? Henry Mellin
- 1660–1677 William Jones
- 1677–1708 Thomas Stanoe
- 1708–1727 Edward Tenison (afterwards Bishop of Ossory, 1730)
- 1727–1742 Thomas Tenison (son of above)
- 1742–1767 Rhys, Rice (or Price) Williams
- 1767–1768 Charles Moss
- 1768–1789 George Holcombe
- 1789–?1793 William Probyn
- 1793–?1827 William Crawford (died 1827)
- 1827–1829 Benjamin Millingchamp
- 1829–1832 Henry Thomas Payne
- 1832–1858 Richard Venables
- 1858-1865 John Evans (deceased)
- 1865–1879 David Archard Williams
- 1879–1896 William James (died 1896)
- 1896–1899 Shadrach Pryce (afterwards Dean of St Asaph, 1899)
- 1899-1901 David Lewis (died 1901)
- 1901-1914 Owen Evans
- 1914–?1938 Robert Williams (died 1938)
- 1938–1949 David Jones
- 1950–1960 John Pugh
- 1960–1967 Ungoed Jacob (afterwards Dean of Brecon, 1967)
- 1967–1974 Owen Jenkins
- 1974–1982 Thomas Evans
- 1982–1985 Roy Davies (afterwards Bishop of Llandaff, 1985)
- 1985–1991 Bertram Hughes
- ?1991–1993 Kerry Goulstone (afterwards Dean of St Asaph, 1993)
- 1993–1999 Islwyn John
- 1999–2004 Anthony Crockett (afterwards Bishop of Bangor, 2004)
- 2004–2012 Alun Wyn Evans
- 2012–2017 Roger Hughes
- 12 November 2017 – 29 November 2023 Dorrien Davies (became Bishop of St Davids)
- 11 January 2024 – present Matthew Hill

== Sources ==
- Jones, B., ed. (1965), Fasti Ecclesiae Anglicanae 1300–1541, vol. 11, pp. 64–65
- Hardy, Thomas Duffus, ed. (1854), Fasti Ecclesiae Anglicanae 1066–1854, 1, p. 313
