= Eifion Evans (archdeacon of Cardigan) =

British archdeacon (1911–1997)

(David) Eifion Evans (22 January 1911 – 23 May 1997) was Archdeacon of Cardigan from 1967 to 1979.

Evans was educated at the University College of Wales and St. Michael's College, Llandaff; and ordained in 1935. After curacies in Llanfihangel-ar-Arth and Llanbadarn Fawr he was a Chaplain to the British Armed Forces during World War II. held incumbencies at Spittal, Llangadog, After this he held incumbencies at Penrhyncoch and Aberystwyth before his appointment as Archdeacon. His son, Wyn Evans, was bishop of St Davids from 2008 To 2016.

Church in Wales titles
Preceded by Owen Jenkins	Archdeacon of Cardigan; 1967–1979	Succeeded by George Noakes
