= Armorial of the Church of England =

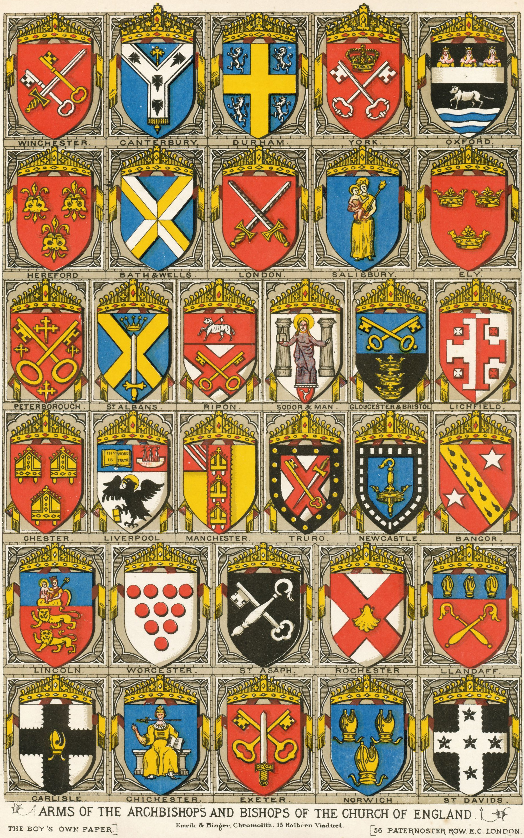
Arms shown in The Boy's Own Paper, circa 1885

England has a long tradition of ecclesiastical heraldry. An Anglican bishopric is considered a corporation sole, and most have been granted official arms. Incumbents may impale their personal arms with those of their see.

== Arms of Dioceses ==
=== Province of Canterbury ===
Image	Details
	Bath and Wells, recorded at unknown date Escutcheon: Azure a saltire per saltire quarterly counterchanged Or and Argent.
	Birmingham, granted 8 March 1906 Escutcheon: Per pale indented Or and Gules five roundels two two and one and in chief two crosses patee all counterchanged.
	Bristol, recorded at unknown date Escutcheon: Sable, three ducal coronets in pale Or.
	Canterbury, recorded at unknown date Escutcheon: Azure an archiepiscopal staff in pale Or surmounted of a pall Argent fringed of the second and charged with four crosses patee fitchee Sable.
	Chelmsford, granted 12 August 1949 Escutcheon: Or on a saltire Gules a pastoral staff of the first and a sword Argent pomel and hilt also of the first.
	Chichester, recorded at unknown date Escutcheon: Azure Our Blessed Lord in judgement seated in His throne His dexter hand upraised Or His sinister hand holding an open book Proper and out of His mouth a two-edged sword the point to the dexter Gules.
	Coventry, granted 24 January 1919 Escutcheon: Gules a cross potent quadrante in the centre Argent within a bordure of the last charged with eight torteaux.
	Derby, granted 29 October 1927 Escutcheon: Purpure a cross potent quadrate Argent in chief three fountains.
	Ely, assumed circa 1290 Escutcheon: Gules three Ducal Coronets two and one Or.
	Exeter, recorded at unknown date Escutcheon: Gules a sword erect in pale Argent hilted Or surmounted of two keys addorsed in saltire wards in chief of the last.
	Gibraltar in Europe, recorded at unknown date Escutcheon: Per fess indented gules and argent; in chief a pastoral staff and key in saltire or, upon them a cross patée (or Maltese cross) of the second. In base, on a rock proper, a lion of England holding a Passion-Cross of the first.
	Gloucester, recorded at unknown date Escutcheon: Azure two keys endorsed in saltire wards upwards Or.
	Guildford, granted 30 September 1927 Escutcheon: Gules two keys conjoined wards outwards in bend the uppermost Or the other Argent a sword of the third pommelled and hilted of the second interposed between them in bend sinister all within a bordure Azure charged with ten woolpacks also Argent.
	Hereford, recorded at unknown date. Originally personal arms of Thomas de Cantilupe. Escutcheon: Gules three leopards' faces reversed jessant-de-lis two and one Or.
	Leicester, granted 12 August 1949 Escutcheon: Gules a pierced cinquefoil Ermine in chief a lion passant guardant grasping in the dexter forepaw a cross crosslet fitchee Or.
	Lichfield, recorded at unknown date Escutcheon: Per pale Gules and Argent, a cross potent quadrate in the centre per pale of the last and Or between four crosses patée, those to the dexter of the second and those to the sinister Or. Escutcheon: Per pale Gules and Argent, a cross potent quadrate in the centre per pale of the last between four crosses patée counterchanged.
	Lincoln, recorded at unknown date Escutcheon: Gules two lions passant guardant in pale Or on a chief Azure the Virgin ducally crowned sitting on a throne issuant from the chief in her dexter arm the Infant Jesus and in her sinister hand a sceptre all Gold.
	London, recorded at unknown date Escutcheon: Gules two swords in saltire Proper hilts and pommels Or.
	Norwich, recorded at unknown date Escutcheon: Azure three mitres two and one Or.
	Oxford, recorded at unknown date Escutcheon: Sable a fesse Argent in chief three demi ladies couped at the waist heads affrontee Proper ducally crowned Or arrayed and veiled of the second in base an ox also Argent horned and hoofed Gold passing a ford barry wavy of six Argent and Azure.
	Peterborough, recorded at unknown date Escutcheon: Gules two keys in saltire the wards upwards between four cross crosslets fitchee Or.
	Portsmouth, granted 25 July 1927 Escutcheon: Per fesse Or and Gules in chief upon waves of the sea Proper a lymphad Sable and in base two keys conjoined wards outwards in bend the uppermost Or the other Argent a sword interposed between them in bend sinister Argent pommel and hilt Or.
	Rochester, recorded at unknown date Escutcheon: Argent on a saltire Gules an escallop Or.
	St Albans, 8 June 1877 Escutcheon: Azure a saltire Or over all a sword erect in pale Proper pomel and hilt of the second in chief a celestial crown Gold.
	St Edmundsbury and Ipswich, 12 August 1949 Escutcheon: Per pale Gules and azure between three ducal coronets a demi lion passant guardant conjoined to a demi hull of an ancient ship all Or.
	Salisbury, recorded at unknown date Escutcheon: Azure Our Lady crowned holding in her dexter arm the Infant Jesus in her sinister hand a sceptre Or round both heads circles of glory of the last.
	Southwark, granted 19 June 1905 Escutcheon: Argent eleven fusils in cross conjoined seven in pale fessewise four in fesse palewise and in the dexter chief a mitre all Gules.
	Truro, granted 28 April 1877 Escutcheon: Argent on a saltire Gules a key ward upwards surmounted by a sword point downwards saltirewise Or in base a fleur-de-lis Sable a bordure of the last charged with fifteen bezants.
	Winchester, granted 19 June 1905 Escutcheon: Gules two keys endorsed and conjoined at the bows in bend wards in chief the uppermost Or the lower Argent a sword the point in chief interposed between them in bend sinister of the third pomel and hilt Gold.
	Worcester, recorded at unknown date Escutcheon: Argent ten torteaux four three two and one.

=== Province of York ===
Image	Details
	Blackburn, granted 19 February 1927 Escutcheon: Per fesse Gules and Or two keys in saltire wards downwards Argent in chief and a rose barbed and seeded Proper in base.
	Carlisle, recorded at unknown date Escutcheon: Argent on a cross Sable a mitre Or.
	Chester, recorded at unknown date Escutcheon: Gules three mitres with their labels Or.
	Durham, recorded in 1530 Escutcheon: Azure a cross Or between four lions rampant Argent.
	Leeds, granted 27 June 2014 Escutcheon: Azure a cross formy throughout the limbs in pale taking the form of a Greek Rho Or in the first quarter a rose Argent barbed and seeded Proper.
	Liverpool, granted 17 July 1882 Escutcheon: Argent an eagle rising Sable beaked and legged and a glory round the head Or holding in the dexter claw an inkhorn Proper a chief per pale Azure and Gules charged on the dexter side with an open book Or inscribed in letters Sable "Thy Word is Truth" and on the sinister side an ancient ship with three masts sails furled also Or.
	Manchester, granted 5 January 1848 Escutcheon: Or on a pale engrailed Gules three mitres of the field a canton of the second thereon three bendlets enhanced also of the field.
	Newcastle, granted 29 January 1929 Escutcheon: Gules a cross between four lions rampant Or on a chief of the last three castles triple-towered of the first.
	Sheffield, granted 21 April 1914 Escutcheon: Azure a crozier in pale ensigned by a fteur-de-lis between in fess a key surmounted by a sword in saltire to the dexter and to the sinister eight arrows interlaced and banded saltirewise all Or.
	Sodor and Man, recorded at unknown date Escutcheon: Argent, upon a pedestal the Virgin Mary with her arms extended between two pillars, in the dexter hand, a church proper, in base the arms of Man in an escutcheon
	Southwell and Nottingham, granted 21 April 1914 Escutcheon: Sable three fountains Proper a chief Or thereon a pale Azure charged with a representation of the Virgin Mary seated bearing the Infant Christ Or between on the dexter side a stag lodged Proper and on the sinister two staves raguly crossed Vert.
	York, recorded at unknown date Escutcheon: Gules two keys in saltire Argent in chief a regal crown Or.

=== Former dioceses ===
Image	Details
	Bradford, granted 4 June 1920 Escutcheon: Azure, two keys in saltire Or, in chief a woolpack proper corded of the second.
	Gloucester and Bristol, recorded at unknown date Escutcheon: Azure, two keys endorsed in saltire wards upwards Or, impaling, Sable, three ducal coronets in pale Or.
	Ripon and Leeds, granted 3 November 1836 Escutcheon: Argent, on a saltire gules two keys in saltire, wards upwards, Or; on a chief of the second a Holy Lamb proper.
	Wakefield, granted 17 June 1905 Escutcheon: Or, a fleur-de-lis azure; on a chief of the last three celestial crowns of the field.
	Westminster, no known arms Escutcheon: Unknown.

== Arms of Chapters ==
=== Cathedrals ===
Image	Details
	Chapter of Birmingham Cathedral, granted 20 February 1927 Escutcheon: Argent, a key in pale wards downwards between in chief two crosses formy and in base two roundels all gules.
	Chapter of Blackburn Cathedral Escutcheon: Unknown
	Chapter of Bradford Cathedral Escutcheon: Unknown
	Chapter of Bristol Cathedral Escutcheon: Unknown
	Chapter of Canterbury Cathedral, granted before 1619 Escutcheon: Azure, on a cross argent the letters I/X sable.
	Chapter of Carlisle Cathedral Escutcheon: Unknown
	Chapter of Chelmsford Cathedral Escutcheon: Unknown
	Chapter of Chester Cathedral Escutcheon: Unknown
	Chapter of Chichester Cathedral Escutcheon: Unknown
	Chapter of Coventry Cathedral Escutcheon: Unknown
	Chapter of Derby Cathedral Escutcheon: Unknown
	Chapter of Durham Cathedral Escutcheon: Unknown
	Chapter of Ely Cathedral, Escutcheon: Gules, three keys erect Or, wards dexter.
	Chapter of Exeter Cathedral Escutcheon: Unknown
	Chapter of Gloucester Cathedral, 28 March 1542 Escutcheon: Azure, on a fess Or three crosses fitchy of the field, on a canton of the second a demi-rose en soleil issuant from the chief line gules between two demi fieurs-de-lys issuant from the flanks also of the field.
	Chapter of Guildford Cathedral Escutcheon: Unknown
	Chapter of Hereford Cathedral Escutcheon: Unknown
	Chapter of Leicester Cathedral Escutcheon: Unknown
	Chapter of Lichfield Cathedral Escutcheon: Unknown
	Chapter of Lincoln Cathedral Escutcheon: Unknown
	Chapter of Liverpool Cathedral, granted 1 October 1931 Escutcheon: Argent, a cross patriarchal throughout gules.
	Chapter of London Cathedral, Escutcheon: Gules two swords in saltire Proper hilts and pommels Or, a letter 'D' in chief of the last.
	Chapter of Manchester Cathedral, Escutcheon: Gules, three bendlets Or.
	Chapter of Newcastle Cathedral, Escutcheon: Gules, three Castles triple towered Argent, St Cuthbert's Cross Proper on a chief Azure.
	Chapter of Norwich Cathedral, Escutcheon: Argent, a cross Sable.
	Chapter of Oxford Cathedral, granted before 1574 Escutcheon: Between quarterly, 1st & 4th, France modern (Azure three fleurs-de-lys Or), 2nd & 3rd, England (Gules in pale three lions passant guardant Or), on a cross Argent an open Bible proper edged and bound with seven clasps or, inscribed with the words In principio erat Verbum, et Verbum erat apud Deum and imperially crowned Or.
	Chapter of Peel Cathedral Escutcheon: Unknown
	Chapter of Peterborough Cathedral Escutcheon: Unknown
	Chapter of Portsmouth Cathedral Escutcheon: Unknown
	Chapter of Ripon Cathedral Escutcheon: Unknown
	Chapter of Rochester Cathedral Escutcheon: Unknown
	Chapter of Sheffield Cathedral, granted 9 February 1951. Escutcheon: Per fess gules and sable, a sword in bend sinister, point upwards, argent, hilt and pomel Or, surmounted of a key in bend, ward upward and outward, of the last, in chief eight arrows fretted in saltire, points downward, banded of the third.
	Chapter of St Albans Cathedral, Escutcheon: Azure, a saltire Or.
	Chapter of St Edmundsbury Cathedral Escutcheon: Unknown
	Chapter of Salisbury Cathedral Escutcheon: Unknown
	Chapter of Southwark Cathedral, granted 2000. Escutcheon: Per pale Gules and Or, a cross lozengy counterchanged, in the dexter chief a lily slipped Argent.
	Chapter of Southwell Cathedral Escutcheon: Unknown
	Chapter of Truro Cathedral Escutcheon: Unknown
	Chapter of Wakefield Cathedral Escutcheon: Unknown
	Chapter of Wells Cathedral Escutcheon: Unknown
	Chapter of Worcester Cathedral, Escutcheon: Argent ten torteaux four three two and one a canton azure, the Virgin ducally crowned sitting on a throne issuant from the chief in her dexter arm the Infant Jesus and in her sinister hand a sceptre all Gold.
	Chapter of York Cathedral Escutcheon: Unknown, uses the arms of the Diocese of York.

=== Abbeys ===
Image	Details
	Chapter of Westminster Abbey Escutcheon: Azure, a cross patonce between · five martlets Or; and on a chief Or a pale quarterly of France Modern and England between two roses gules barbed and seeded proper.

== Arms of Theological Colleges ==
Image	Details
	College of the Resurrection, Mirfield, Escutcheon: Unknown Crest: Agnus Dei
	Cranmer Hall, Durham, Escutcheon: Arms of St John's College, Durham
	Oak Hill College, Escutcheon: Unknown
	The Queen's Foundation, Escutcheon: Unknown
	Ridley Hall, Cambridge, Escutcheon: Per pale Gules and Argent, in dexter two swords in saltire Proper hilts and pommels Or, between in sinister chief a bull passant Gules and in sinister base a narcissus Argent slipped and leaved Vert, all within a bordure Ermine.
	Ripon College Cuddesdon, Escutcheon: Unknown
	St Stephen's House, Oxford, granted 2 November 2020 Escutcheon: Per chevron Gules and Sable in chief two Cross crosslets and in base a Celestial Crown Or.
	Trinity College, Bristol, Escutcheon: Unknown
	Westcott House, Cambridge, Escutcheon: The arms of the See of Durham and the personal arms of Bishop Brooke Foss Westcott
	Wycliffe Hall, Oxford, Escutcheon: Gules, an open book proper the pages inscribed with the Latin words "Via Veritas Vita" in letters Sable on a chief Azure three crosses crosslet Argent and in base an estoile Or.

== See also ==
- Armorial of the Church of Ireland
- Armorial of the Scottish Episcopal Church
- Armorial of the Church in Wales
