= Wyn Evans =

British bishop

The Right Reverend Wyn Evans
- Bishop of St Davids
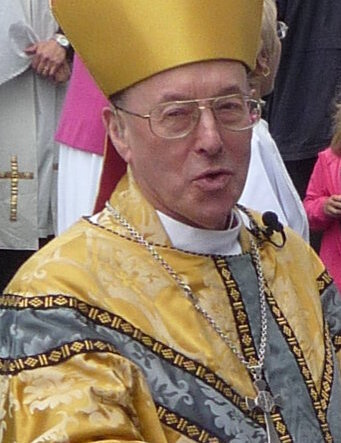
- Bishop Evans in 2014
- Diocese: St Davids
- In office: 2008–2016
- Predecessor: Carl Cooper
- Successor: Joanna Penberthy

Orders
- Ordination: 1972
- Consecration: 29 November 2008

Personal details
- Born: 4 October 1946 (age 80)
- Denomination: Anglicanism
- Parents: Eifion Evans (father)
- Spouse: Diane Katherine Baker
- Education: University College, Cardiff

John Wyn Evans (born 4 October 1946) is a retired Anglican bishop. He had served as Bishop of St Davids in the Church in Wales from 2008 to 2016.

== Biography ==
Born into a clerical family (his father was Eifion Evans (archdeacon of Cardigan)) in 1946, he studied archaeology at Cardiff University and was ordained in 1972. He was made a deacon on 18 September 1971 and ordained priest the following Feast Day of Mary Magdalene (22 July 1972) – both times by Eric Roberts, Bishop of St Davids, at St Davids Cathedral (where he also served his title/curacy). Evans was a Minor Canon at St Davids Cathedral then Diocesan Archivist until 1982. He was Diocesan Director of Education from then until 1992. During this period he was also a senior lecturer and chaplain at Trinity College, Carmarthen. From then until retirement, he was successively Canon, Dean and then Bishop of St Davids.

He was elected by the Electoral College of the Church in Wales on 1 September 2008. He was consecrated a bishop in a service at Llandaff Cathedral on 29 November 2008, and enthroned in St Davids Cathedral on 6 December 2008. He is credited with extensive knowledge of the history of his cathedral ('Pevsner', 'Pembrokeshire'). He was also the Patron of the Order of St David and St Non as the Bishop of St Davids. In retirement, he continues to serve in the Diocese.

Church in Wales titles
Preceded by Bertie Lewis	Dean of St Davids; 1994–2008	Succeeded by Jonathan Lean
Preceded by Carl Cooper	Bishop of St Davids; 2008–2016	Succeeded by Joanna Penberthy
