= Dorrien Davies =

Welsh priest

Dorrien Paul Davies (born March 1964) is a Welsh Anglican bishop. Since 2023, he has been the Bishop of St Davids; he was previously the Archdeacon of Carmarthen and priest in charge of St Clears.

Davies was educated at the University of Wales, Lampeter, made deacon on 25 June 1988 and ordained priest 24 June 1989. After a curacy in Llanelli he held incumbencies at Llanfihangel Ystrad, St Dogmaels and Dewisland. He was collated (made archdeacon) on 12 November 2017. On 17 October 2023, Davies was elected Bishop of St Davids; the confirmation of his election (i.e. when he legally became bishop) was on 29 November and his episcopal consecration took place on 27 January 2024 at Bangor Cathedral. In March 2026 he became Dean of the Chapel Royal in Wales.

Church in Wales titles
Preceded by Roger Hughes	Archdeacon of Carmarthen; 2017–2023	Succeeded by Matthew Hill
Preceded by Joanna Penberthy	Bishop of St Davids; 2023–	Incumbent
