= Richard Venables =

British priest (1774–1858)

Richard Venables (1775-1858) was Archdeacon of Carmarthen from 1832 until his death.

He was born in London, educated at Clare College, Cambridge and ordained in 1798. He held incumbencies at Warmsfield, Ackwicken with Leziate, Clyro, Llansantffraed and Newchurch.

He died on 15 January 1858.
