= Governing Body of the Church in Wales =

Governing body

Type
- Type: Tricameral
- Chambers: House of Bishops; House of Clergy; House of Laity

Leadership
- Archbishop of Wales: Cherry Vann
- Seats: 143

The Governing Body of the Church in Wales is the deliberative and legislative body of the Church in Wales, broadly speaking equivalent to the General Synod of the Church of England. The Governing Body usually meets twice each year to receive reports, discuss issues concerning the church and make decisions on matters brought before it.

== History ==
The Church in Wales was created in 1920 under the Welsh Church Act 1914. It came about as a result of a desire by the Welsh people to be led by Welsh bishops and to be able to worship in their own language. It is not only a disestablished church but also a disendowed church. It became an independent province of the Anglican Communion. It adopted a written constitution and elected a Governing Body which at first used to meet once a year, but now meets twice annually. The Governing Body has ultimate authority "to approve liturgies, review organizational structures, and secure firm fiscal resources for the mission and ministry of the church". The Church in Wales was one of the first members of the Anglican Communion to adopt synodical government.

== Membership ==
The Governing Body of the Church in Wales is tricameral and consists of three orders of participants:

1. The House of Bishops, which includes all six diocesan bishops from the six dioceses in the archbishopric;
2. The House of Clergy, which includes fifty-one clerical representatives who are elected at diocesan level;
3. The House of Laity, which includes eighty-six non-clerical representatives from the parishes of the archbishopric, again elected at diocesan level.

The chairman and vice-chairman of the Representative Body of the Church in Wales are ex-officio members and other persons can be co-opted to cover their areas of expertise. The total membership of the Governing Body is 143 persons. For some matters, a simple majority verdict is required, but for other more important issues, a motion will only be passed if it receives a majority in all three of the Houses.
