= David Archard Williams =

Welsh Anglican priest

David Archard Williams was a Welsh Anglican priest.

Williams was Vicar of Carmarthen, Chancellor of the Diocese of St Davids and Archdeacon of Carmarthen from 1865 to 1879.
