= Armorial of the Church of Ireland =

List of bearings of the dioceses of a church

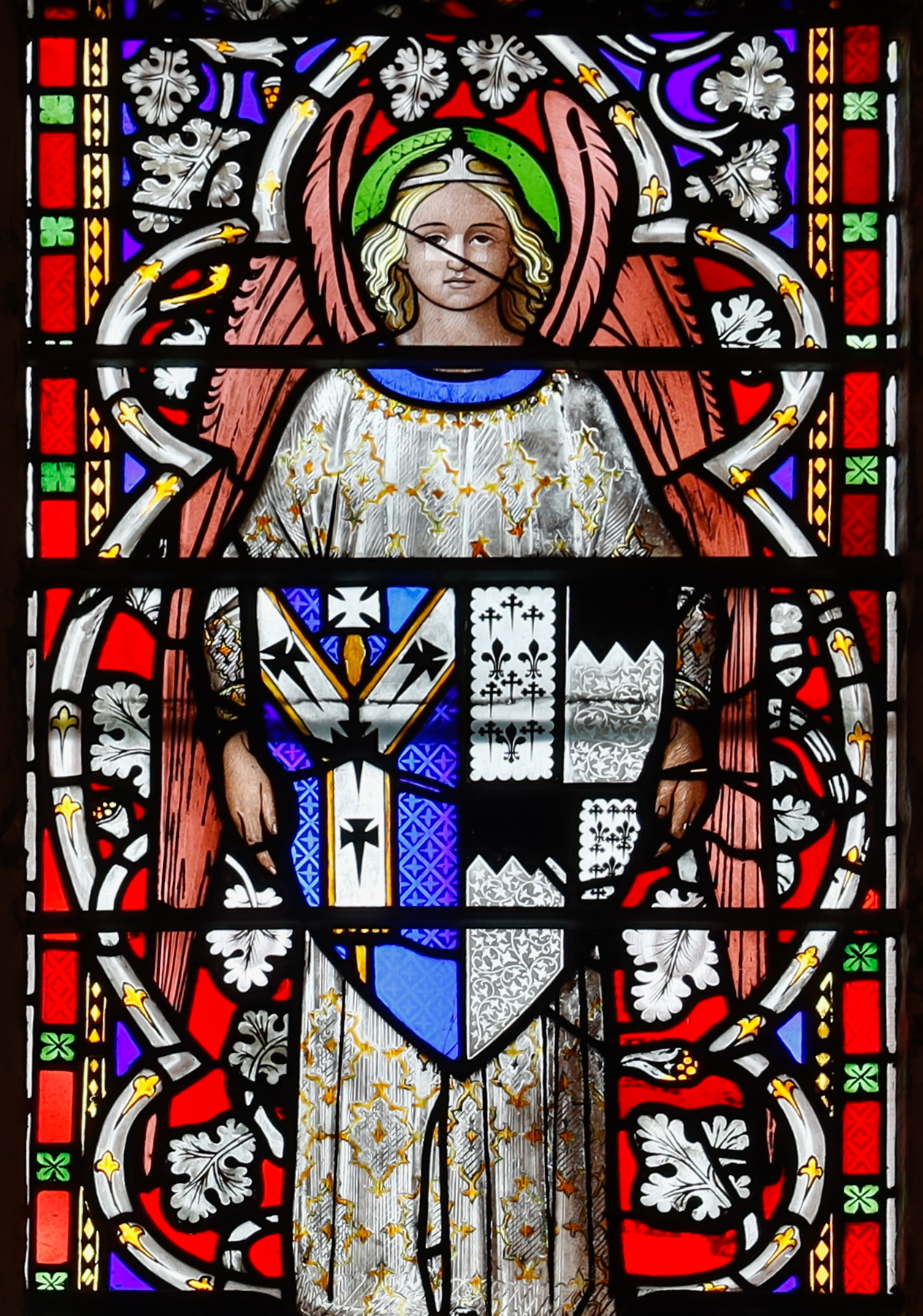
Stained glass window at St Patrick's Cathedral showing the personal arms of Lord John Beresford impaled with those of the Diocese of Armagh

== Province of Armagh ==
Image	Details
	Armagh, recorded at unknown date Escutcheon: Azure an episcopal staff Argent ensigned with a cross pattée fitchée at all points Or surmounted by a pall of the second edged and fringed of the third charged with four crosses formée fitchée Sable.
	Clogher, granted 4 August 2006 Escutcheon: Azure a bishop in full pontificals Proper in the act of benediction and holding his pastoral staff in the left hand.
	Connor, granted 24 May 1945 Escutcheon: Azure a lamb passant supporting with the dexter foreleg a staff Proper flying therefrom a pennon Argent charged with a saltire Gules between three crosses crosslet Or on a chief of the last two crosiers in saltire of the field.
	Derry and Raphoe, granted 24 May 1945 Escutcheon: Gules two swords in saltire Proper the hilts in base Or on a chief Azure a harp Or stringed Argent (Derry) impaling Ermine a chief per pale Azure and Or the first charged with a sun in splendour of the last the second with a cross pattée Gules (Raphoe).
	Down and Dromore, Escutcheon: Azure two keys in saltire the wards in chief Or surmounted in the fess point by a lamb passant Proper (Down) impaling Argent two keys in saltire the wards in chief Gules surmounted by an open book in fess Proper between two crosses pattées-fitchies in pale Sable (Dromore).
	Kilmore, Elphin and Ardagh, granted 24 May 1945 Escutcheon: In chief Argent on a cross Azure a pastoral staff enfiling a mitre all Or. (Kilmore) in base Sable two pastoral staves in saltire Or in base a lamb couchant Argent. (Elphin) impaling Or a cross Gules between four trefoils slipped Vert on a chief Sable a key erect Or. (Ardagh)

== Province of Dublin ==
Image	Details
	Dublin and Glendalough, confirmed 5 April 2016 Escutcheon: Azure an episcopal staff Argent ensigned with a cross pattée fitchée at all points or surmounted by a pall of the second edged and fringed of the third charged with five crosses formée fitchée Sable the whole within a bordure also Gold.
	Cashel and Ossory Escutcheon: Quarterly 1st Gules two keys in saltire the wards upwards Or (Cashel) 2nd Gules between five crosses patée fitchée a covered cup ensigned with a cross patée all Or (Ossory) 3rd Sable two crosiers indorsed in saltire suppressed by a mitre labelled Or (Ferns and Leighlin) 4th Vert two keys in saltire bows down Or between in chief a lion passant Argent in fess on the dexter an open Bible and on the sinister an annulet of the second in base six cloven tongues one two and three of the third the whole ensigned with a bishop’s mitre also Gold (Waterford and Lismore).
	Cork, Cloyne and Ross Escutcheon: In chief Argent a cross pattée Gules thereon a mitre enfiling pastoral staff Or (Cork) in base Azure a mitre Proper labelled Or between three crosses pattée fitchee Argent (Cloyne). No arms for Ross.
	Meath and Kildare, granted 10 December 2015 Escutcheon: Per pale dexter Sable three mitres two and one Argent (Meath) sinister Argent a saltire engrailed Gules on a chief Azure an open bible leaved Proper bound and slasped Or (Kildare). Motto: The Law Was Given By Moses But Grace And Truth Come By Jesus.
	Tuam, Limerick and Killaloe, granted 2024 Escutcheon: 1st for TUAM: Azure beneath three Gothic arches conjoined as many figures Or their faces, hands and feet Proper in the middle the Blessed Virgin holding upon the sinister arm the Child their hands circled in glory on her dexter side a bishop pontifically vested his dexter hand raised in benediction the sinister hand holding a crozier bend sinister-wise and on her sinister side an angel the head circled of the Second the dexter forearm elevated and beneath the sinister arm a lamb all of the Last 2nd for LIMERICK AND EMLY: Azure in dexter chief the head of a pastoral staff in the sinister a mite and in base two keys addorsed in saltire wards to the chief and pointed downward all OR 3rd for KILLALOE: Argent between four trefoils slipped Vert a cross Gules on a chief Azure a key fesswise ward to the dexter and downwards Or 4th for KILLALA: Gules a pastoral staff OR debruised by an open book the leaves Proper bound of the second 5th for CLONFERT: Azure two pastoral staffs addorsed in saltire Or 6th for KILFENORA: Argent a rose Gules barbed Vert seeded Or on a chief Sable three mullets Gold 7th for ARDFERT AND AGHADOE: Azure two keys in saltire wards to the chief and pointed downwards surmounted of a pastoral staff Or 8th for ACHONRY: Argent between four trefoils slipped Vert a pastoral staff Gules surmounted of an open book the leaves Proper bound Azure 9th for KILMACDUAGH: Sable a cross Argent surmounted of two pastoral staffs addorsed in saltire Or suppressed of a mitre of the Second garnished of the Third

== See also ==
- Armorial of the Church of England
- Armorial of the Scottish Episcopal Church
- Armorial of the Church in Wales
