= David Morris (bishop) =

Welsh bishop

The Right Reverend David Morris CStJ
- Director of Ordinands
- Church: Church in Wales
- Diocese: Diocese of St Asaph
- In office: 2024 to 2026
- Other posts: Suffragan bishop of Bardsey (2024–2026); Priory Dean of St John Ambulance Cymru (2019–2026)

Orders
- Ordination: 2010 (priest)
- Consecration: 11 May 2024 by Andy John

Personal details
- Born: 1986 (age 39–40)
- Denomination: Anglicanism
- Education: University of Wales, Bangor

David Thomas Morris CStJ (born 1986) is an Anglican bishop in the Church in Wales who was assistant bishop for the Diocese of Bangor before returning to parish ministry.

== Early life and education ==
He was born in Cymmer, Rhondda, Wales in 1986. He graduated in theology from the University of Wales, Bangor, graduating with a Bachelor of Theology (BTh) degree in 2007. He then trained for ministry at St Michael's College, Llandaff, graduating with a Master of Theology (MTh) in 2010.

== Ordained ministry ==
He was ordained in the Church in Wales as a deacon in 2009 and as a priest in 2010, at Llandaff Cathedral. He was then the youngest priest in the Church in Wales. He served his curacy in Merthyr Tydfil, and was then a parish priest in South Cardiff and in the Vale of Glamorgan. In addition to his parish roles, he was a diocesan vocations advisor and then the diocesan director of ordinands. In May 2022, he was appointed as Residentiary Canon at Bangor Cathedral and Director of Ministry at the Diocese of Bangor.

In addition to his parish ministry, Morris has been a chaplain to St John Ambulance Cymru since 2010. In January 2020, he was appointed Commander of the Most Venerable Order of St John (CStJ). He served as the first Dean of the Priory for Wales from 2019 and a trustee of St John Ambulance Cymru from 2020, with the terms of office concluding in 2026.

On 19 January 2024, it was announced that he would be the next Assistant Bishop of Bangor. His consecration took place on 11 May 2024, and he was given the suffragan title of Bishop of Bardsey. At the age of 38, he became the youngest ever bishop in the Church in Wales.

His ministry as Bishop of Bardsey concluded in February 2026, following the unexpected retirement of Archbishop Andy John.

It was announced in April 2026 that he would take up a new dual role in the Diocese of St Asaph as Diocesan Director of Ordinands and Priest in Charge of St Marks, Caia Park in Wrexham from June 2026.

== Personal life ==
Morris is engaged to marry Marc Penny: the Church in Wales allows its clergy to enter into same-sex marriages.
