= Armorial of the Scottish Episcopal Church =

This is a list of the armorial of the Scottish Episcopal Church, sorted by diocese. The Scottish Episcopal Church is a Christian church organization of Scotland.

== Arms by Diocese ==
Image	Details
	Aberdeen and Orkney Escutcheon: Azure in the porch of a church St. Nicholas in pontificals his right hand raised over three children in a cauldron surrounded by flames in the left hand a pastoral staff all Proper (Aberdeen) impaling Argent the figure of St. Magnus in royal robes crowned and sceptred Proper (Orkney).
	Argyll and The Isles Escutcheon: Azure two pastoral staves addorsed in saltire beneath a mitre in chief all Or (Argyll) impaling Azure on the waves of the sea in base St. Columba kneeling in a coracle all Proper and looking towards a blazing star in the dexter chief Or. (The Isles).
	Brechin Escutcheon: Or three piles in point Gules.
	Edinburgh Escutcheon: Azure a saltire Argent in the centre chief point a mitre of the last garnished Or.
	Glasgow and Galloway Escutcheon: Argent in base a tree issuing from a mount an old church bell pendent from a bough on the sinister side on the top of the tree a robin upon the trunk of the tree a salmon lying fessways back downwards all Proper holding in its mouth an annulet Or (Glasgow) impaling Argent St. Ninian in pontificals holding a pastoral staff Proper (Galloway).
	Moray, Ross and Caithness, recorded in 1953 Escutcheon: Parted per fess and in chief per pale 1st Or two lions combattant Gules pulling at a cushion of the last issuant from a crescent Azure on a chief wavy of the third three mullets Argent (Moray) 2nd Argent a bishop standing on the sinister habited in a long robe close-girt Purpure mitred and holding in the sinister hand a crozier Or and pointing with the dexter hand to a saint affrontée his hands clasped on his breast Proper habited Gules about his head a halo of the third (Ross) 3rd Azure issuant from an antique boat Or a demi-bishop proper vested Argent his mitre and pastoral staff in bend sinister of the second accompanied by two demi-angels one in the dexter and the other in the sinister chief holding open books Proper their wings addorsed also of the second (Caithness).
	St Andrews, Dunkeld and Dunblane, registered in 1961 Escutcheon: Quarterly 1st Azure a saltire Argent (St. Andrews) 2nd per fess Sable and Vert an open book Proper in base fore edges and binding Or a dove Argent her wings displayed in chief perching thereon and holding in her beak a spray of olive Vert (Dunkeld) 3rd chevronny Or and Gules a saltire engrailed Azure charged at the fess point with a crescent inverted Argent (Dunblane) 4th Azure a saltire Argent supported in front of and by St. Andrew enhaloed Or and vested Purpure with mantle Vert and in base a crescent inverted Argent.

== See also ==
- Armorial of the Church of England
- Armorial of the Church of Ireland
- Armorial of the Church in Wales
