= William Beeley =

17th-century Anglican priest

William Beeley was an Anglican priest who was Archdeacon of Carmarthen from 1614–1640.

Beale was educated at University College, Oxford. He was the incumbent at Kings Stanley and the Prebendary of Llanryan.
