= Meredith Morgan =

Welsh priest (died 1612)

Meredith Morgan was a Welsh Anglican priest in the 16th century.

Morgan was educated at Jesus College, Oxford. He held Livings at Compton Beauchamp and Llanwrthwl. He was appointed Archdeacon of Carmarthen in 1583, a post he held until his death on 4 December 1612.
