= Armorial of the Church in Wales =

The following coats of arms are those of the Church in Wales and those which each bishop is entitled to bear while in office.

The Church’s arms feature a gold Celtic cross over a blue (azure) Latin cross on a white (argent) shield.

The diocesan coats of arms are identical to their episcopal counterparts, except that they are not surmounted by a mitre. In recent years, the introduction of new logos for many dioceses has blurred the distinction between the episcopal and diocesan arms, and the two are now often used interchangeably.

== Arms of the Church in Wales ==
Image	Details
	Church in Wales Escutcheon: Argent on a cross Azure a Celtic cross Or.

== Arms of Dioceses ==
Image	Details
Ancient arms Modern arms Alternate arms	Bangor, recorded in 1512. The original arms of those featuring goutte-de-larmes, later depicted as goutte-de-poix on a bend Or, and, in modern times, goutte-de-poix on a bend Argent. Ancient escutcheon: Gules a bend Or guttee-de-larmes between two pierced mullets Argent. Modern escutcheon: Gules a bend Argent guttee-de-poix between two pierced mullets Argent. Alternate escutcheon: Gules a bend Or guttee-de-poix between two pierced mullets Argent.
	St Asaph, recorded in 1512 Escutcheon: Sable two keys in saltire wards upwards Argent.
	St Davids, recorded at unknown date Escutcheon: Sable on a cross Or five pierced cinquefoils of the field.
	Llandaff, recorded at unknown date Escutcheon: Sable two pastoral staves endorsed in saltire the dexter Or the sinister Argent on a chief Azure three mitres of the second.
	Monmouth, granted 20 April 1922 Escutcheon: Per pale Azure and Sable two croziers in saltire Or between in chief a bezant charged with a lion passant guardant Gules in fesse two fleurs de lys and in base one fleur-de-lys of the third.
	Swansea and Brecon, granted 4 February 1924 Escutcheon: Per fesse Azure and Or in chief surmounting a Catherine Wheel issuant an eagle rising reguardant of the second and in base a fleur-de-lys of the first.

== See also ==
- Armorial of the Church of England
- Armorial of the Church of Ireland
- Armorial of the Scottish Episcopal Church
