= Joanna Penberthy =

Welsh Anglican priest

The Right Reverend Jo Penberthy
- Bishop of St Davids
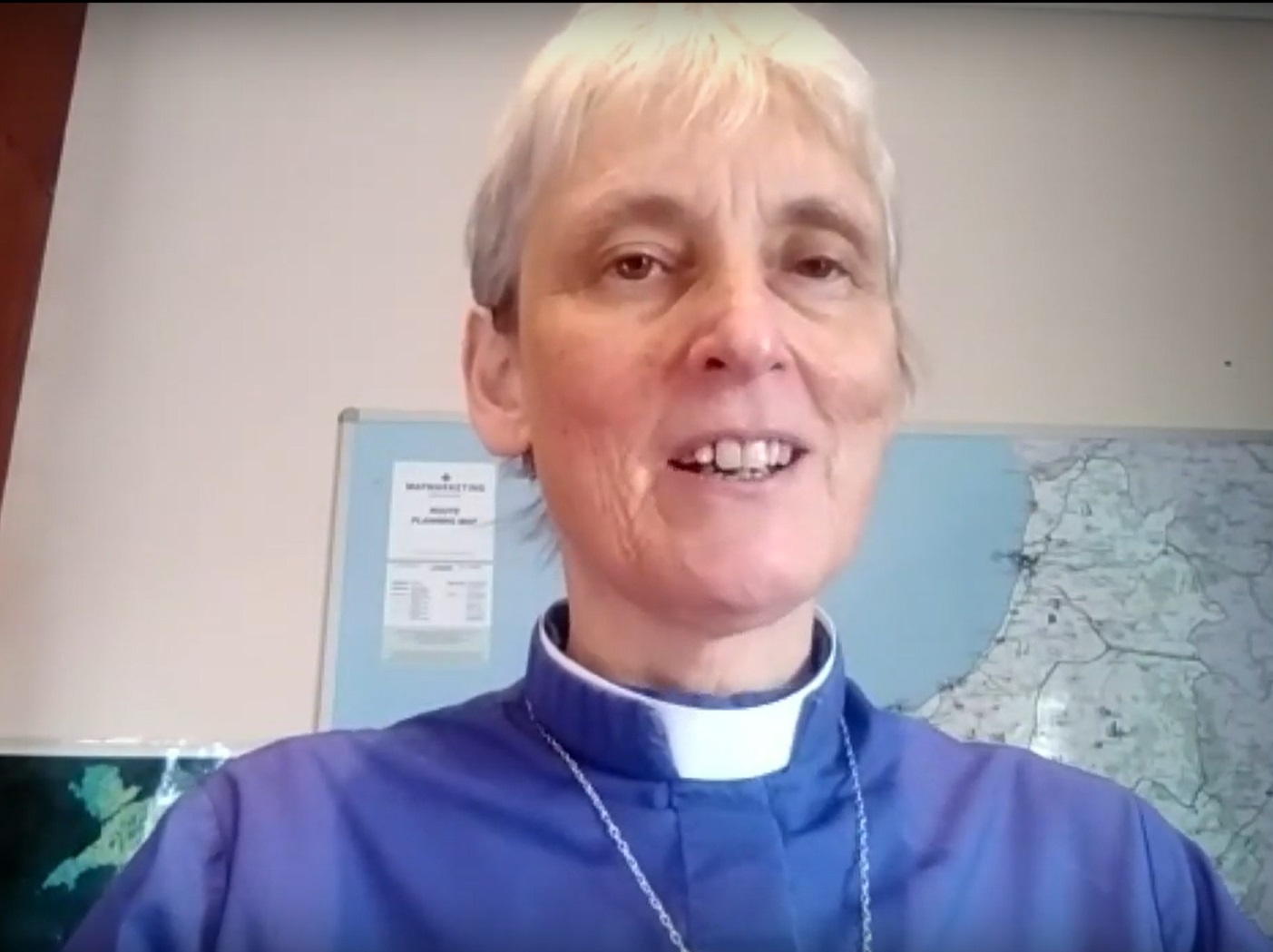
- Bishop Penberthy in 2021
- Church: Church in Wales
- Diocese: St Davids
- In office: 30 November 2016 – 31 July 2023
- Predecessor: Wyn Evans
- Successor: Dorrien Davies
- Other post: Rector of Glan Ithon (September 2015 – November 2016)

Orders
- Ordination: 1987 (deacon); 1997 (priest)
- Consecration: 21 January 2017 by Barry Morgan

Personal details
- Born: Joanna Susan Penberthy; 1960 (age 65–66)
- Denomination: Anglicanism
- Spouse: Adrian Legg
- Children: Four
- Education: Newnham College, Cambridge; St John's College, Nottingham; Cranmer Hall, Durham

Joanna Susan Penberthy (born 1960) is a retired Welsh Anglican bishop. From 2016 until 2023 she served as the bishop of St Davids in the Church in Wales. She was the first woman to become a bishop in the Church in Wales, when she was consecrated a bishop on 21 January 2017.

She has ministered in the Church of England and the Church in Wales: she has served as a deaconess in the Diocese of Durham and the Diocese of Llandaff, as a deacon in the Diocese of Llandaff, the Diocese of St Asaph, and the Diocese of St Davids, and as a priest in the Diocese of St Davids, the Diocese of Bath and Wells, and the Diocese of Swansea and Brecon. Her final appointment before being raised to the episcopate was as rector of the Benefice of Glan Ithon in the Diocese of Swansea and Brecon (2015 to 2016).

== Early life and education ==
Penberthy was born in 1960 in Swansea, Wales. She was brought up in Cardiff, and was educated in the city at Cardiff High School, a comprehensive school. She studied at Newnham College, Cambridge, graduating with a Bachelor of Arts (BA) degree in 1981; as per tradition, her BA was promoted to a Master of Arts (MA Cantab) degree in 1985. In 1983, she entered St John's College, Nottingham, an Evangelical Anglican theological college, to train for ministry. During this time, she also studied for a Master of Theology (MTh) degree, which she completed in 1984.

In addition to her full-time ministry, Penberthy undertook part-time study in quantum physics. She was awarded a Doctor of Philosophy (PhD) in July 2019 by the University of Nottingham. Her doctoral thesis was titled "Reading the "Paradoxical Book of Bell": a case study in theology and science".

== Ordained ministry ==
In 1984, Penberthy was licensed a deaconess in the Church of England. From 1984 to 1985, she served as a full-time deaconess at St Andrew's Church, Haughton-le-Skerne in the Diocese of Durham. She moved to Wales in 1985, and began her ministry in the Church in Wales. From 1985 to 1989, she served as a full-time deaconess in the Benefice of Llanishen and Lisvane on the outskirts of Cardiff and in the Diocese of Llandaff.

In 1987, Penberthy was ordained a deacon; the Church in Wales had ordained women to the diaconate since 1980. From 1987 to 1989, she was also a non-stipendiary minister in the benefice of Llanishen and Lisvane. From 1989 to 1993, she was a non-stipendiary minister in the benefice of Llanwddyn (St Wyddyn) and Llanfihangel-yng-Nghwynfa and Llwydiarth in the Diocese of St Asaph. Her husband served as its Vicar during this period. From 1993 to 1995, she was a non-stipendiary minister in the benefice of St Sadwrn's Church, Llansadwrn with Llanwrda and Manordeilo in the Diocese of St Davids; her husband was vicar of this benefice from 1993 to 2010. From 1994, she was also a provincial officer in the Division for Parochial Development and Renewal; this was an appointment focused on evangelism.

In 1997, Penberthy was ordained a priest; this was the first year that the Church in Wales ordained women to the priesthood, making her one of the first female priests in the province. She continued working for the Division for Parochial Development and Renewal until 1999. From 1999 to 2001, she was priest-in-charge of St Cynwyl's Church, Cynwyl Gaeo with Llansawel and Talley in the Diocese of St Davids. She was made vicar of the benefice in 2001. She was an adult education officer for the Diocese of St Davids between 2001 and 2002, and warden of Readers for the diocese between 2002 and 2010. In February 2007, she was made a canon of St Davids Cathedral, the first woman to be appointed a canon at that cathedral.

In 2010, Penberthy returned to England, leaving behind her benefice and canonry. From 2010 to 2011, she was priest-in-charge of the benefice of Charlton Musgrove (St John) (St Stephen), Cucklington and Stoke Trister in the Diocese of Bath and Wells. She was made rector of the benefice in 2011. In July 2015, it was announced that she would be leaving the diocese to return to Wales. On 8 September 2015, she was inducted as the rector of Glan Ithon (a benefice consisting of Llandrindod Wells (Holy Trinity) (Old Parish Church) and Cefnllys with Diserth with Llanyre and Llanfihangel Helygen) in the Diocese of Swansea and Brecon.

=== Episcopal ministry ===
On 2 November 2016, it was announced that Penberthy had been elected the next bishop of St Davids. She is the first woman to be elected a bishop in the Church in Wales. Her election was confirmed on 30 November 2016, thereby legally becoming the 129th bishop of St Davids. She was consecrated a bishop on 21 January 2017 during a service at Llandaff Cathedral, the last bishop consecrated by Barry Morgan, Archbishop of Wales, before his retirement. She was enthroned at St Davids Cathedral on 11 February 2017.

Penberthy's social media post from a personal Twitter account in March 2021 which said "never, never trust a Tory" led to significant online criticism, from the public and other clergy, including from Archbishop of Canterbury, Justin Welby. On 2 June 2021 she issued an apology on the Bishop of St Davids website in which she stated that she "trust[s] and have trusted many Conservatives and know there are many honourable people in that party". Following formal letters of complaint by clergy and others, it was announced on 21 June 2021 that Penberthy would be taking a month's sick leave, the srchdeacons' letter referring to the recent controversy. The announcement was subsequently amended to read that she would be on sick leave until the end of September, then until the middle of October, and then until the end of October. She began a phased return to work on 1 November 2021. From 31 August 2022, Penberthy was again off work on sick leave; on 18 May 2023, she announced her retirement with effect from 31 July.

== Personal life ==
Penberthy is married to Adrian Legg, who is also an Anglican priest. They have four children.

In 2015, whilst serving as rector within the diocese of Bath and Wells, she stood as Labour candidate in the Blackmoor Vale ward of South Somerset District Council. She came in last place, out of five candidates, polling 275 votes (5%).

Church in Wales titles
Preceded by Wyn Evans	Bishop of St Davids; 2016–2023	Succeeded by Dorrien Davies
