= Y Llan =

Weekly bilingual newspaper produced by the Anglican Church in Wales

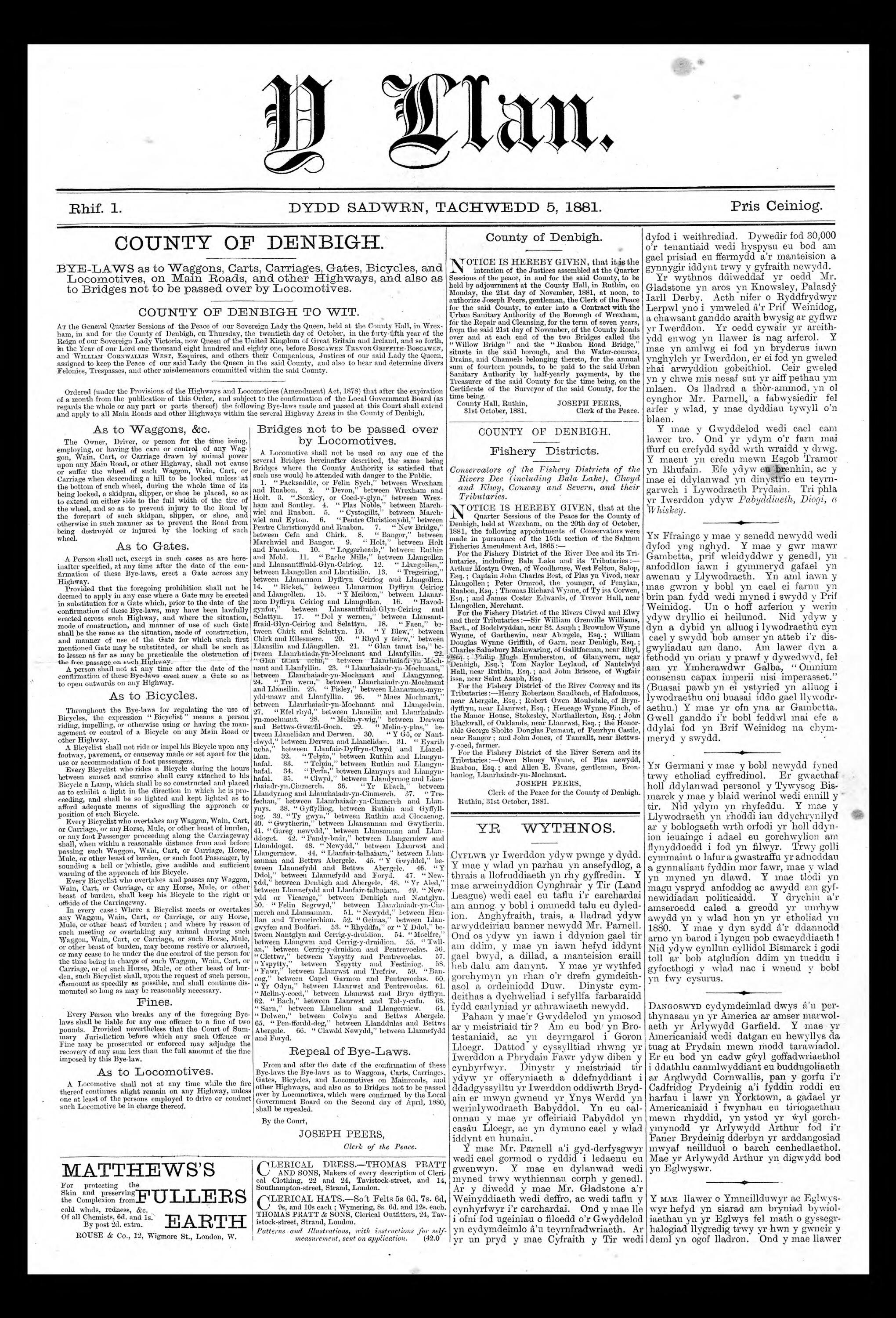
- Type: weekly newspaper
- City: Rhyl

Y Llan was a weekly Welsh and English newspaper produced by the Anglican Church in Wales and distributed throughout Wales.

The paper contained general local, national, and international news, plus readers' contributions and reports on religious matters. Associated titles: Y Dywysogaeth (1870–1881); Y Llan a'r Dywysogaeth (1884–1955).
