= Book of Common Prayer (1984) =

Liturgical book of the Church in Wales

Book of Common Prayer for use in the Church in Wales
- 1984 BCP volume I
- Editor: Thomas Cranmer
- Language: English; Welsh
- Subject: Anglican devotions Anglican liturgy Anglican sacraments Anglican theology
- Genre: Liturgical book Prayer book
- Publisher: Church in Wales Publications
- Publication date: 1984
- Publication place: Wales, United Kingdom
- Media type: Print (hardback)
- Pages: 652 pp. (volume I)
- OCLC: 1274933304

The 1984 Book of Common Prayer is a revised and authorised version of the Book of Common Prayer specifically for the use of the Church in Wales.

== Background ==
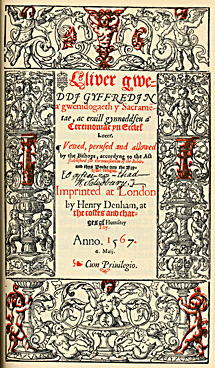
The first Book of Common Prayer in Welsh published in 1567

The first Book of Common Prayer in Welsh —Y Llyfr Gweddi Cyffredin— was published in 1567. A revised version based on the 1662 Book of Common Prayer was published in 1664. Since then, the Church in Wales used the prayer book of the Church of England, unmodified, until 1966.

In 1944, the Church in Wales introduced a supplement to its liturgical calendar which gave commemorations to Welsh saints such as Asaph, Cadoc, David and Illtud, thus the beginning of the Church's assertion of its distinctive character and voice. A new Standing Liturgical Advisory Commission was established in 1951, whose proposals for a revised rite for the Holy Eucharist was authorised by the Bench of Bishops in 1966 for experimental use. The revision lasted from the 1950s to the publication of the 1984 prayer book.

== Overview ==
The Book of Common Prayer for use in the Church in Wales, which is written in traditional English and underwent a line-by-line revision process by the Governing Body of the Church in Wales between 1980 and 1984, was specifically designed to replace the 1662 English prayer book. Initially, it was intended to be published in single volume. However, the sheer exigencies of bringing together so many rites in bilingual format prohibited a one-volume format, the propers and the psalter alone ran to 600 pages. The Prayer Book ended up releasing in a series of four volumes: the English-only volume I containing the Calendar, framework lectionary, Morning and Evening Prayer, Holy Eucharist, propers and psalter; a second volume containing the Calendar, the Eucharistic Rite and propers bilingually; a third volume containing the Calendar, lectionary, Morning and Evening Prayer, collects and psalter bilingually; and finally the bilingual volume II (Welsh: Y Llyfr Gweddi Cyffredin, Cyfrol II), containing the Eucharistic Rite, Public and Private Baptism, Thanksgiving for the Birth or Adoption of a Child, the Catechism, Confirmation, Ordination, Matrimony, Blessing of a Civil Marriage, Ministry of Healing, Burial, and a table of Kindred and Affinity.
