= Prayer During the Day =

Anglican liturgy

Prayer During the Day is a liturgy of the Church of England from the service book Common Worship. Along with Night Prayer (or "Compline"), it is a daily prayer service to supplement Morning Prayer and Evening Prayer.

The Church of England's publication Common Worship Daily Prayer contains this shorter form of Prayer for each day of the week, as well as the longer forms of Morning and Evening Prayer. The Church of England's own literature outlines several different methods for its use, which correspond to the canonical hours of Terce, Sext, and None, which are fixed prayer times. It may be used for a daily quiet time of reading, prayer and reflection.
