= The Holy Eucharist: Rite Two =

1993 Anglican liturgical book

The Holy Eucharist: Rite Two (Chinese: 聖餐崇拜禮文第二式) is an alternative service book authorised in 1993 by the 41st Diocesan Synod of the Diocese of Hong Kong and Macau, known as the General Synod of Hong Kong Sheng Kung Hui after its establishment in 1998. It is used as an alternative to the Book of Common Prayer (Chinese: 公禱書) published by the former Chung Hua Sheng Kung Hui.
