= Islwyn John =

Welsh Anglican priest

Islwyn David John (28 October 1933 – 14 January 2009) was a Welsh Anglican priest who was Archdeacon of Carmarthen from 1993 until 1999.

John was educated at St David's College, Lampeter and ordained in 1959. After curacies in Brynamman and Carmarthen he held incumbencies in Penbryn and Llandysul until his Archdeacon’s appointment.

Church in Wales titles
| Preceded by Kerry Goulstone | Archdeacon of Carmarthen; 1993–1999 | Succeeded by Anthony Crockett |
