= Robert Williams (archdeacon of Carmarthen) =

Welsh historian (1863–1938)

Robert Williams (1863 – 13 October 1938) was Professor of History at St David's College, Lampeter.

He was born in Penycefn, Tregaron, Ceredigion. He was a history teacher in Saint David's College, Lampeter. He was also vicar of Llandeilo Fawr and Archdeacon of Carmarthen.

== Works ==
- Y Mabinogion' (Everyman's library). Gol. gan R. Williams. Dent, h.d.
- The Attack on the Church in Wales. "Evidence and Facts Collected and Sifted", 1912

=== Contributions to the DNB ===
This author wrote articles for the Dictionary of National Biography (signing as "R. W."), and the list on this page is complete to 1901.

- Howel ab Owain Gwynedd
- Howel y Fwyall
- William Hughes (d. 1600)
- Griffith Jones (1683–1761)

== Works about Williams ==
- Ben Davies, Robert Williams DYSG (1955) t. 206-9.
- Ayron Jenkins, Yr Hybarch Robert Williams (1939) t. 8-12.
- D. S. Jones, Er cof am yr Hyrbarch Robert Williams (1939) t. 13-14.
- Williams, Robert, in Alumni Oxonienses: the Members of the University of Oxford, 1715-1886 by Foster, Joseph, Oxford: Parker and Co., 1888-1892.
- Obituary Archdeacon Robert Williams in The Times
