= Islwyn Watkins =

Welsh artist and ceramics expert

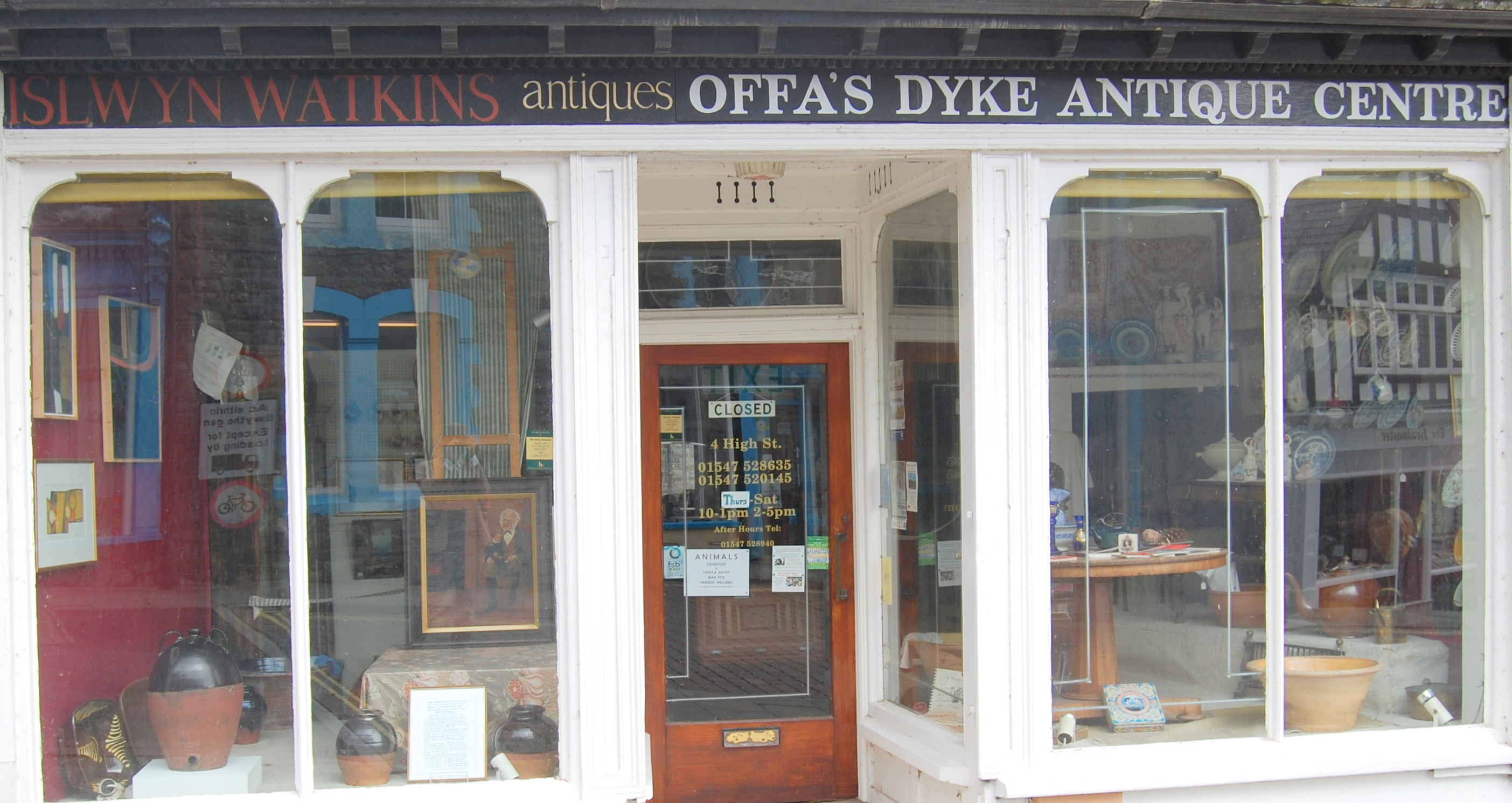
Islwyn Watkins shop in Knighton

Islwyn Watkins (1938 – 30 December 2018) was a Welsh artist, educator and slipware ceramics expert. Born in Tonypandy, Rhondda, he studied at Cardiff College of Art from 1954 to 1959 and was influenced by the work of Kurt Schwitters. Watkins was a member of The Welsh Group from 1959.

Watkins taught art at Ravenscroft School from 1959 to 1964 and later studied lithography at Hornsey College of Art. In 1960 Watkins started to make abstract, waste wood assemblages. He collaborated with Jeff Nuttall, the author of Bomb Culture. A book by Nuttall called Mr Watkins got drunk and had to be carried home was named after him.

In 1965 together with Bruce Lacey and John Latham he helped create the sTigma, an installation at Better Books in Charing Cross Road, London. Watkins completed a master's degree at the University of Wisconsin–Madison.

In 1967 he lectured at Birmingham School of Art. Moving to Knighton, Powys Wales in 1978 he was appointed chair of the Welsh Group. He also ran the Offa's Dyke Antique Centre in a Grade II listed building, in Knighton. At the 2000 Brecon Jazz Festival, Watkins and Nuttall created Merz Jam, an installation inspired by Kurt Schwitters with Lol Coxhill performing.

His work is in the collection of Amgueddfa Cymru – Museum Wales.
