= Shadrach Pryce =

British priest

Shadrach Pryce was a Welsh Anglican priest and educationalist in the last part of the 19th century and the first decade of the 20th.

Pryce was born in Dolgellau, Merionethshire the son of Hugh Price (1793-1851), a draper, and educated at Queens' College, Cambridge. Ordained in 1863, he began his career as a teacher at Dolgelly Grammar School after which he was Rector of Yspytty then Vicar of Llanfihangel Aberbythych. During this time he was also the Government Educational Inspector for Breconshire and Carmarthenshire (1867–1894).

Later he was Archdeacon of Carmarthen (1896–1899) and Examining Chaplain to John Owen, Bishop of St Davids. From 1899 to 1910 he was Dean of St Asaph.

He died on 17 September 1914. He had married Margaret Ellen Davies and had two sons and seven daughters. His son Lewis Pryce became Archdeacon of Wrexham and his daughter Myfanwy Pryce was a published novelist. His brother John Pryce was Dean of Bangor.

Church of England titles
Preceded by Watkin Williams	Dean of St Asaph; 1899 – 1910	Succeeded by Llewelyn Wynne Jones
