= Islwyn Jones =

Welsh footballer

Personal information
- Full name: Islwyn Jones
- Date of birth: 8 April 1935 (age 91)
- Place of birth: Merthyr Tydfil, Wales
- Position: Wing half

Senior career*
Years	Team	Apps	(Gls)
1952–1955	Cardiff City	26	(0)
- * Club domestic league appearances and goals

Islwyn Jones (born 8 April 1935) is a Welsh former professional footballer. He made 26 appearances in the Football League for Cardiff City.

== Career ==
Born in Merthyr Tydfil, Jones worked in Merthyr Vale Colliery as a teenager while playing football for Troedyrhiw Boy's Club. He began his career with Cardiff City in 1952. He spent two years in the club's reserve side before making his professional debut on 13 September 1954 in a 3–1 victory over Sheffield United in place of the injured Billy Baker. He made 23 appearances in all competitions during his first season but fell out of favour the following year, losing his place to Colin Baker. He left the club at the end of the season, moving into non-league football before retiring due to a knee injury. He later worked in a Hoover factory in Pentrebach for over 30 years.

== Career statistics ==
Club	Season	League			FA Cup		Other		Total	
Club	Season	Division	Apps	Goals	Apps	Goals	Apps	Goals	Apps	Goals
Cardiff City	1954–55	First Division	20	0	1	0	2	0	23	0
Cardiff City	1955–56	First Division	6	0	0	0	0	0	6	0
Total			26	0	1	0	1	0	28	0
