= Islwyn Davies =

Wales international rugby league footballer

Izzy Davies
Personal information
- Full name: William Islwyn Davies
- Born: 20 March 1912; Merthyr Tydfil, Wales
- Died: 1997 (aged 84–85); Warrington, England

Playing information
- Position: Wing, Centre
Club
Years	Team	Pld	T	G	FG	P
1934–37	St. Helens	105	39	48		213
1937–39	Warrington	69	57	0	0	171
	Total	174	96	48	0	384
Representative
Years	Team	Pld	T	G	FG	P
1935	Wales	1		1		2

William Islwyn "Izzy" Davies (20 March 1912 – 1997) was a Welsh professional rugby league footballer who played in the 1930s. He played at representative level for Wales, and at club level for St. Helens and Warrington, as a wing or centre.

== Background ==
Izzy Davies was born in Merthyr Tydfil, Wales, and he died in Warrington, Cheshire, England.

== Playing career ==
=== International honours ===
Izzy Davies played on the wing, and scored a goal for Wales while at St. Helens in the 11-24 defeat by England at Anfield, Liverpool on Wednesday 10 April 1935.

=== Club record ===
Izzy Davies held Warrington's "Most Tries In A Season" record with 34 tries scored during the 1938–39 Northern Rugby Football League season, the 34th try coming against Oldham on Saturday 29 April 1939, this record was extended by Brian Bevan.
