= Church in Wales =

Anglican church in Wales

Church in Wales Yr Eglwys yng Nghymru
- Type: Communion
- Classification: Protestant
- Orientation: Anglican
- Scripture: Christian Bible
- Theology: Anglican doctrine (Note: With various theological and doctrinal identities, including Anglo-Catholic, Liberal and Evangelical)
- Polity: Episcopal
- Primate: Archbishop of Wales
- Language: Welsh and English
- Headquarters: Cardiff
- Territory: Wales with 1,500 congregations
- Independence: 1920 (disestablishment)
- Members: 42,441 (electoral roll, 2018), 210,000 (attendees, 2017)
- Official website: www.churchinwales.org.uk

Flag of the Church in Wales

The Church in Wales (Welsh: Yr Eglwys yng Nghymru) is an Anglican church in Wales, composed of six dioceses.

The Archbishop of Wales does not have a fixed archiepiscopal see, but serves concurrently as one of the six diocesan bishops. The position is held by Cherry Vann, Bishop of Monmouth, since July 2025. Vann is the first woman to hold the post of Archbishop of Wales, and therefore the first to be an Anglican archbishop in the United Kingdom and Ireland.

Unlike the Church of England, the Church in Wales is not an established church. Disestablishment took place in 1920 under the Welsh Church Act 1914 but the Church still bears some of the characteristics of a state church, especially in areas like marriage and burial grounds.

As a province of the Anglican Communion, the Church in Wales recognises the Archbishop of Canterbury as a focus of unity, but without any formal authority. A cleric of the Church in Wales can be appointed to posts in the Church of England, including the See of Canterbury; a former Archbishop of Canterbury, Rowan Williams, was from Wales and served as Archbishop of Wales before his appointment to Canterbury.

According to the World Christian Database, published in 2021, and Encyclopedia Britannica, there are an estimated 1.1 million people who were baptised as Anglicans in the Church in Wales.

== Official name ==
The Church in Wales (Welsh: Yr Eglwys yng Nghymru) adopted its name by accident. The Welsh Church Act 1914 referred throughout to "the Church in Wales", the phrase being used to indicate the part of the Church of England within Wales. At a convention (of the Welsh Church) held in Cardiff in October 1917, Mr Justice Sankey said that, while the name "the Church of Wales" appealed to him, he advised that there were good legal reasons why the name "the Church in Wales" should be adopted, at least at first, to follow the wording in the act. The matter was therefore left at that convention for the second Governing Body to decide at its first session.

== History ==
Christianity in Wales can be traced back to the Romano-British culture: two of the earliest British saints, Julius and Aaron, were reportedly martyred in the Roman legionary town of Caerleon, south-east Wales, in the 3rd century CE. An organised episcopal church has had continuous existence in Wales since that time. The Age of the Saints in the 6th and 7th centuries was marked by the establishment of monastic settlements throughout the country by religious leaders such as Saint David, Illtud, Padarn and Saint Teilo. This was the period when the Welsh people developed a shared national identity, arising from the Welsh language and religious beliefs.

The Welsh refused to cooperate with Augustine of Canterbury's mission to the Anglo-Saxons in the 6th century CE. However, a combination of other Celtic dioceses reconciling with the Holy See meant that from the early Middle Ages, even before the conquest of Wales by Edward I, the Welsh dioceses were part of the Province of Canterbury and also in communion with the See of Rome until the English Reformation. Afterward, they were part of the Church of England until disestablishment in 1920 as, during the reign of Henry VIII, Wales was incorporated into the legal realm of the Kingdom of England by the Laws in Wales Acts 1535 and 1542.

=== Disestablishment ===
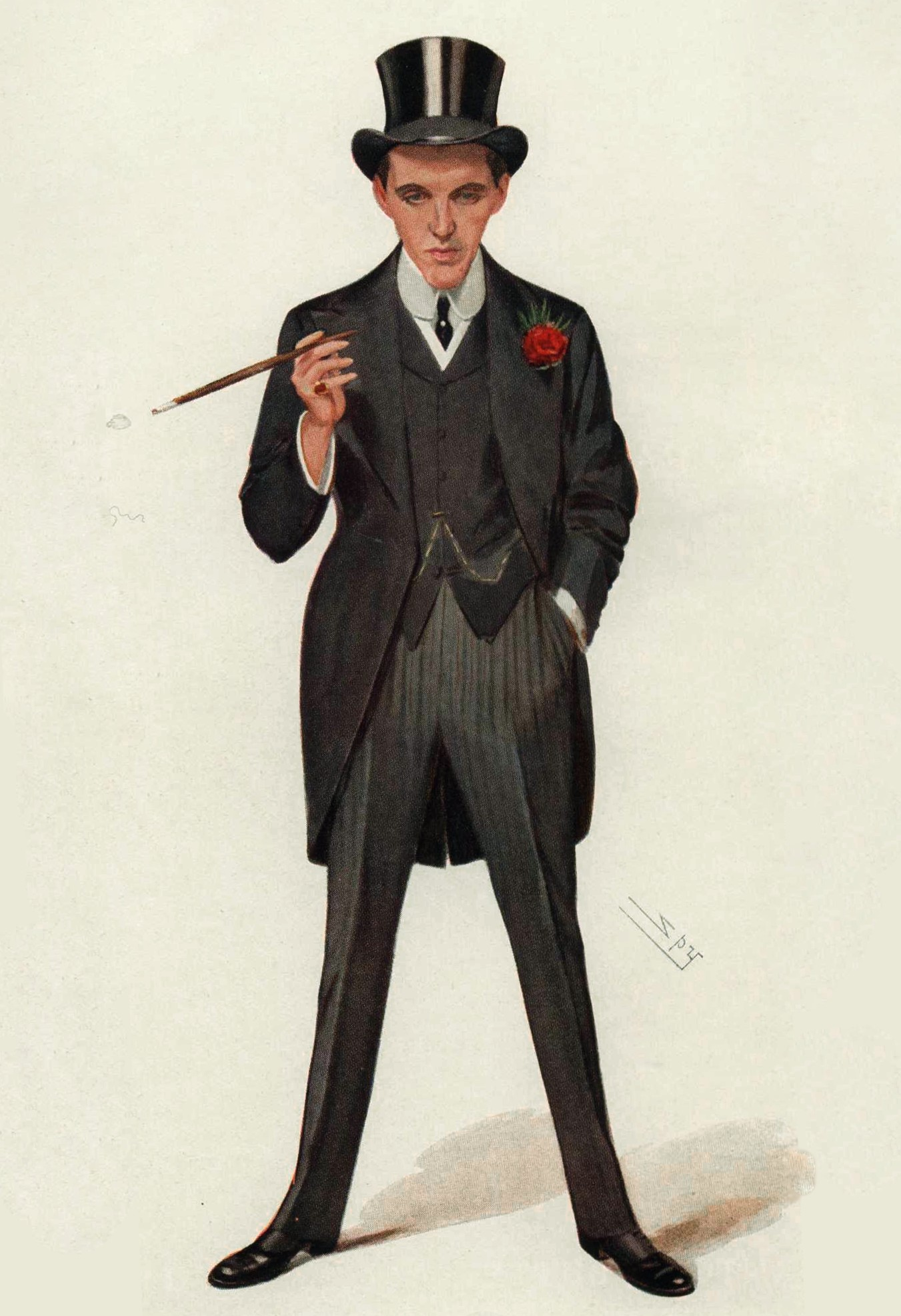
F. E. Smith, later 1st Earl of Birkenhead, opposed disestablishment.

During the 19th century, Nonconformist churches increased in Wales, and eventually, the majority of Welsh Christians were Nonconformists, although the Church of England remained the largest single denomination. By the mid-19th century, failing to appoint a Welsh-speaking bishop to any Welsh diocese for 150 years caused resentment; disestablishment was seen as a way to assert national and linguistic identity.

Under the influence of Nonconformist politicians such as David Lloyd George, the Welsh Church Act 1914 was passed by the Liberal Government to separate Anglicanism in Wales from the Church of England. The bill was fiercely resisted by members of the Conservative Party and blocked in the House of Lords, but it was eventually passed under the provisions of the Parliament Act 1911.

The opposition to disestablishment was led by the Conservative politician F. E. Smith, who characterised the disestablishment bill as "a Bill which has shocked the conscience of every Christian community in Europe." In response to this description, the writer G. K. Chesterton penned the satirical poem "Antichrist, or the Reunion of Christendom: An Ode" containing the memorable retort "Chuck It, Smith".

The act both disestablished and disendowed the "Church in Wales", the term used to define the part of the Church of England which was to be separated. Disestablishment meant the end of the church's special legal status, and Welsh bishops were no longer entitled to sit in the House of Lords as Lords Spiritual. As the Church in Wales became independent of the state, tithes were no longer available to the church, leaving it without a major source of income.

Disendowment, which was even more controversial than disestablishment, meant that the endowments of the Church in Wales were partially confiscated and redistributed to the University of Wales and local authorities. This process was carried out by the Welsh Church Commissioners following the principles set out in the Welsh Church Act 1914. Endowments before 1662 were to be confiscated; those of later date would remain. This was justified by the theory that the pre-1662 endowments had been granted to the national church of the entire population, and hence belonged to the people as a whole rather than to the Church in Wales; this reasoning was hotly contested. The date 1662 was that of the Act of Uniformity following the Restoration; it was after this point that Nonconformist congregations began to develop and the Church of England ceased to be a comprehensive national church. Although secularisation of the cathedrals had previously been suggested, the Church in Wales retained all the ancient church buildings and the privilege of conducting legal marriages without reference to the civil registrar.

The Welsh Church Act 1914 was the second Act of Parliament to receive Royal Assent without approval by the House of Lords under the Parliament Act 1911 - the first was the Government of Ireland Act 1914. Due to the outbreak of World War I in 1914, the Suspensory Act 1914 was passed at the same time, meaning that the act would not be implemented for the duration of the war. Disestablishment finally came into effect in 1920.

The Church in Wales adopted a written constitution, which has been revised from time to time, and elected a Governing Body which initially met once a year, but now meets twice annually. The Governing Body has ultimate authority "to approve liturgies, review organizational structures, and secure firm fiscal resources for the mission and ministry of the church". The Church in Wales was one of the first members of the Anglican Communion to adopt synodical government.

=== Since 1920 ===
Parishes overlapping the border were allowed to vote either to accede to the Church in Wales or to continue in the Church of England; so the line of disestablishment is not the same as the border between the two countries. A few districts in the former counties of Monmouthshire, Radnorshire and Flintshire remain attached to parishes in the Dioceses of Hereford and Chester and consequently they are part of the Church of England. A complete English rural deanery with the generalised name March containing Oswestry and areas to the north-west of Shrewsbury, was transferred from its historic setting in the Diocese of St Asaph to be consistent with the civil border there. The churches of St Mary, Caernarfon, and Llangadwaladr, Anglesey, were transferred from the Diocese of Chester to that of Bangor.

Today, the Church in Wales is fully independent of both the state and the Church of England. It is an independent member of the Anglican Communion, as are the Church of Ireland and the Scottish Episcopal Church.

In the first years of the 21st century, the Church in Wales has begun to engage in numerous debates. These particularly concern the appointment of women to the episcopate and the provincial recognition of the equal statuses of the Welsh and English languages in all aspects of church life.

== Membership ==
Following disestablishment in 1920, the Church in Wales initially fared better than the Nonconformist churches, which suffered a decline during the late 20th century. In 1960, the Church claimed to have 182,854 communicants, an increase on the comparable figure of 155,911 for 1945, although a reduction on the figure of 196,389 Easter communicants in 1938. The Anglican Church does not have "a single definition of 'membership' in the Church in Wales." In 2006, the average weekly attendance was recorded at 6,780 aged under 18 and 39,490 aged over 18. The highest attendance was at Easter, with 68,120 at worship (68,837 in 2007). In 2014, the attendance in the Church in Wales was 52,021 at Easter: a decline of about 16,000 members since 2007, but an increase from 2013. Also, in 2014, nineteen churches were closed or made redundant. Overall, in 2014, the Church in Wales reported 152,000 attenders in its parishes and congregations, compared to 105,000 in 2013. In 2018, the number of communicants during Easter was 46,163 and the number of persons on the Electoral Roll was 42,441.

From 2015 statistics, when all "other major acts of worship" are included, the church reported having 206,000 total attenders. "Such additional services, which include civic services, family services, Remembrance, Carol and Christingle services, registered a total attendance of some 206,000 in 2015, compared with 152,000 in 2014." In 2017, "parishes recorded 210,000 people attending other types of traditional worship, which might include civic services, family services, Remembrance, Carol and Christingle services." In 2020, the church counted 146 church schools and 27,000 students.

In 2021, the World Christian Database, produced by the Center for the Study of Global Christianity at Gordon-Conwell Theological Seminary and The World Christian Encyclopedia published by Edinburgh University Press, estimated there were 1.1 million baptised Anglicans in Wales, making it the largest Christian denomination in the country. In 2000, some membership figures taken as a percentage of the population was 1.6%. Between 1996 and 2016 the number of signed-up Church in Wales members dropped from 91,247 to 45,759 or 1.5% out of a total population of 3,113,150 The number of Church in Wales members on the "Electoral Roll" dropped further to 42,441 by 2018 or 1.4% out of the total Welsh population of 3,187,203 The Anglican church claims to be the largest denomination in Wales.

== Structure ==
Map of the dioceses in the Church in Wales

The polity of the Church in Wales is episcopal church governance, which is the same as other Anglican churches.

Prior to 1920, there were four dioceses in Wales, all part of the Province of Canterbury and each led by its own bishop:

- The Diocese of Bangor
- The Diocese of St Asaph
- The Diocese of St Davids
- The Diocese of Llandaff

Two additional dioceses were created soon after the disestablishment of the Church in Wales:

- The Diocese of Monmouth in 1921
- The Diocese of Swansea and Brecon in 1923

Monmouth was created from one of the archdeaconries of Llandaff diocese, largely following the boundaries of the traditional (pre-1974) county of Monmouthshire. Swansea and Brecon was created from the eastern part of the St Davids diocese, largely corresponding to the present day city and county of Swansea and the traditional counties of Breconshire and Radnorshire (now part of the county of Powys).

Each diocese is divided into two or three archdeaconries, with 15 of these in total. Each has an archdeacon, who is responsible to the bishop for its administration. The archdeaconries are further divided into deaneries.

Each diocese has its own cathedral, the "mother church" of the diocese and the seat of the bishop - literally, as the cathedral holds the 'cathedra', the bishop's chair. In the cathedral are held important events such as the enthronement of a new bishop and the ordination of priests and deacons. Each cathedral has a dean, appointed to manage the cathedral, with the assistance of the chapter. Together with the archdeacons, the dean of the cathedral is one of the most prominent clerics of the diocese, after the bishop. The chapter is composed of the dean and a number of canons selected from among the clerics of the diocese.

=== Archbishop ===
Until 1920, the Welsh church was part of the Church of England and under the metropolitical jurisdiction of the archbishop of Canterbury. Since independence in 1920, the Church in Wales has been led by the Archbishop of Wales, who is both the metropolitan bishop and primate. The archbishop of Wales is elected from the currently seated diocesan bishops and continues as a diocesan after election. Although it is not necessary for every see in the Church in Wales to be filled before an archbishop may be elected, if the vacancy in a see is caused by the resignation of the archbishop, or it arises within 14 days thereafter, the vacant see must be filled before an archbishop can be elected. In an archiepiscopal vacancy, the senior bishop by date of appointment is acting archbishop.

A former Archbishop of Wales, Rowan Williams, became the first Welsh-born Archbishop of Canterbury. He was consecrated and enthroned as Bishop of Monmouth in 1992 and as Archbishop of Wales in 1999. He was appointed by the Queen (his appointment having been proposed by the Crown Appointments Commission) as Archbishop of Canterbury in July 2002. He left that post in December 2012.

=== Diocesan bishops ===
Unlike bishops in the Church of England, each bishop of the Church in Wales is elected by an "electoral college" which consists of all diocesan bishops of the church (including the archbishop), and clerical and lay representatives of all of the dioceses of the Church in Wales. The composition of the electoral college is weighted so that the diocese in which a vacancy occurs is entitled to twice the number of clerical and lay electors compared with other individual dioceses. If no candidate who is considered by the electoral college obtains the support of the necessary two-thirds majority of the electors within the three consecutive days of deliberation which are allowed, the decision passes to the bench of bishops. This has occurred on two recent occasions. (Note: The failure of the electoral college to elect a new Bishop of Swansea and Brecon in September 2021 brought about the unusual situation where the choice of a new bishop fell to a body with a majority of female members.) In 2013 the Church in Wales officially agreed to the ordination of women as bishops, after a previous proposal for their ordination failed in 2008.

In descending order of seniority, as of 29 July 2025 (when Cherry Vann was elected Archbishop), the bench of Welsh bishops consists of: (Note: Although Press Releases of the Church in Wales suggested that Mary Stallard, when Assistant Bishop, was a member of the bench of Bishops, the Constitution of the Church in Wales (Chapter I; Part II - 7) clearly defines "Bench of Bishops" as meaning "the Archbishop and the other Diocesan Bishops")

- Cherry Vann, and Archbishop of Wales and Bishop of Monmouth
- Gregory Cameron, Bishop of St Asaph
- Andy John, Bishop of Bangor — retires 31 August 2025
- John Lomas, Bishop of Swansea and Brecon
- Mary Stallard, Bishop of Llandaff
- Dorrien Davies, Bishop of St Davids

David Morris became Assistant Bishop of Bangor and Bishop of Bardsey in summer 2024.

In cases where a see is vacant due to the death or translation of a bishop, episcopal acts such as ordinations and confirmations are carried out by the archbishop or by another bishop appointed for that purpose by the archbishop.

As of 2021, four of the bishops used the Welsh name of their See as their episcopal signature (Bangor, Llanelwy for St Asaph, Tyddewi for St Davids, and Mynwy for Monmouth); Landav derives from the Latin Landavensis and the then-Bishop of Swansea and Brecon was Archbishop (who signs as Cambrensis, Latin for 'of Wales').

=== Assistant bishops ===
Assistant bishops may be appointed within the Church in Wales. Although there have been several assistant bishops in the diocese of Llandaff, in practice assistant bishops have been appointed in other dioceses only when the diocesan bishop is the archbishop for the time being, in order to assist them with diocesan episcopal functions. As archbishop, Barry Morgan had an Assistant Bishop of Llandaff: from April 2009 to April 2017 that post was held by David Wilbourne. See also: Assistant Bishop of St Asaph. On 26 January 2022, it was announced that Mary Stallard had been appointed Assistant Bishop of Bangor, to assist Andy John in his diocesan duties while he also serves as Archbishop of Wales; her consecration took place on 26 February 2022 at Bangor Cathedral.

A provincial assistant bishop was appointed in 1996 to provide episcopal ministry to congregations which could not accept the ministry of bishops who ordained women. The role was analogous to the office of Provincial episcopal visitor in the Church of England. David Thomas held the position for twelve years, retiring in 2008. At that time the Bench of Bishops decided that it would not continue to appoint a specific bishop to minister to those who reject the ordination of women as priests. This point was reiterated by Barry Morgan at the Governing Body of the Church in Wales in September 2013, during the debate on whether or not the Church in Wales would ordain women to the episcopate.

Historically, there have been suffragan bishops both before and since disestablishment, including two Bishops of Swansea and one Bishop of Maenan. From 1946 until his death in 1953, Richard William Jones (Archdeacon of Llandaff and Rector of Peterston-super-Ely) was "Assistant Bishop of Wales".

=== Representative Body ===
The Representative Body of the Church in Wales is responsible for the care of the church's property and for funding many of the activities of the church, including support for clergy stipends and pensions. Its somewhat misleading title - unlike the Governing Body, it is not a representative decision-making body - is derived from the fact that under the Welsh Church Act 1914 the bishops, clergy and laity were required to set up a body to "represent" them and to hold property which was transferred to them by the Welsh Church Commissioners.

=== Governing body ===
The Governing Body of the Church in Wales is responsible for decisions that affect the church's faith, order and worship. It also has powers to make regulations for the general management and good government of the church and its property and affairs. The Governing Body is the supreme legislature of the Church in Wales, broadly speaking the Parliament of the Church in Wales. It usually meets twice a year to receive reports and make decisions on matters brought before it.

== Worship and liturgy ==
The Church in Wales as a whole tends to be predominantly High Church, meaning that many of the traditions are inherited from the Oxford Movement in more rural dioceses such as St Davids and Bangor and especially in the industrial parishes of Llandaff and Monmouth. Although the province tends more toward liberal and Anglo-Catholic positions in theology and liturgy, it also has a tradition of evangelicalism, especially in the southern parts of Wales, and the university town of Aberystwyth. In the 1960s there was a revival of evangelicalism within the Church in Wales and the Evangelical Fellowship of the Church in Wales exists to support such members of the church.

=== Book of Common Prayer ===
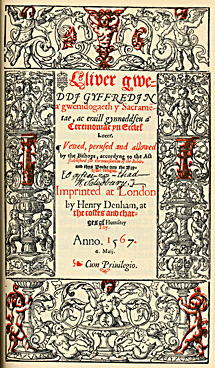
The first Book of Common Prayer in Welsh published in 1567

An Act of Parliament passed in the year 1563, entitled "An Act for the Translating of the Bible and the Divine Service into the Welsh Tongue," ordered that the Old and New Testament, together with the Book of Common Prayer, were to be translated into Welsh. A translation by Richard Davies, bishop of St Davids and the scholar William Salesbury was published in 1567 by Humphrey Toy as Y Llyfr Gweddi Gyffredin. A new revision — based on the 1662 English prayer book and probably by George Griffith, Bishop of St Asaph - was published in 1664. The 1662 prayer book and its Welsh equivalent continued to be used, even after the Church in Wales was disestablished in 1920.

The Church in Wales began revising the Book of Common Prayer in the 1950s. The first material authorised for experimental use was a lectionary in 1956, followed by a baptism and confirmation service in 1958, an order for Holy Matrimony in 1960, and an order for the Burial of the Dead in 1962. These did not however enjoy widespread use. In 1966, an experimental order for the Holy Eucharist was authorised. This was the first to enjoy widespread use. Revision continued throughout the 60s and 70s, with an experimental version of morning and evening prayer in 1969. In 1971, a definitive version of baptism and confirmation was authorised, replacing the equivalent in the 1662 Book of Common Prayer. This was followed in 1974 with a definitive order for the Burial of the Dead, and in 1975 with a definitive order for Holy Matrimony. It was hoped that a new Book of Common Prayer for the Church in Wales would be produced in 1981. However, in 1979, a definitive version of the Holy Eucharist failed to gain a two-thirds majority in the House of Clergy and the House of Laity at the Governing Body. A light revision of the 1966 experimental Eucharist was approved by the Governing Body, and the Book of Common Prayer for use in the Church in Wales was authorised in 1984. This Prayer Book is unique in that it is in traditional English. The Church in Wales first considered a modern language Eucharist in the early 70s, but this received an unremarkable reception. A modern language Eucharist (The Holy Eucharist in modern language) was authorised alongside the new prayer book in 1984, but this did not enjoy widespread use. In 1990, new initiation services were authorised, followed in 1992 by an alternative order for morning and evening prayer in 1994 by an alternative order for the Holy Eucharist, in 1995 by the alternative calendar lectionary and collects, and in 1998 an order for compline was produced. These enjoyed widespread use. In 2003, a new calendar and collects was made part of the Book of Common Prayer for use in the Church in Wales. This was followed in 2004 by an order for the Holy Eucharist, services for Christian initiation in 2006 and in 2009 by daily prayer. Experimental services continued, with an ordinal produced in 2004, Ministry to the Sick and Housebound in 2007, healing services in 2008, funeral services in 2009, and in 2010 marriage services which became part of the Book of Common Prayer in 2013. The ordinal was made part of the prayer book the following year. In 2017, prayers for a child were released, together with a Revised Order for Confirmation, the latter authorised for five years experimental use following the bench of Bishops' decision to admit unconfirmed children and adults to communion. In 2018, Times and Seasons was released. All of these were published on line. The following year Funeral Services became part of the Book of Common Prayer, and additional prayers for different events in life were launched (Blessing of a home, prayers for victims of crime etc.).

=== Other publications ===
Discontinued publications which frequently provided articles of sub-academic quality were Province, Yr Haul â'r Gangell, and Y Llan. Bi-annual news from the Governing Body meeting is released in Highlights. News is predominantly circulated on the Church in Wales' provincial and diocesan websites, and in various diocesan magazines.

== Doctrine and practice ==
Central to the teaching of the Church in Wales is the life, death and resurrection of Jesus Christ. The basic teachings of the church, or catechism, include:

- Jesus Christ is fully human and fully God. He died and was resurrected from the dead.
- Jesus continues to provide the way to eternal life for those who believe.
- The Old and New Testaments were written by people "under the inspiration of the Holy Spirit". The Apocrypha are additional books that are used in Christian worship, but not for the formation of doctrine.
- The two great and necessary sacraments are Holy Baptism and Holy Eucharist
- Other sacramental rites are confirmation, holy orders, matrimony, reconciliation of a penitent, and anointing of the sick.
- Belief in heaven, hell, and Jesus' return in glory.

The balance of Scripture, tradition and reason as authority for faith and practice is traced to the work of Richard Hooker, a sixteenth-century apologist. In Hooker's model, Scripture is the primary means of arriving at doctrine, and things stated plainly in Scripture are accepted as true. Issues that are ambiguous are determined by tradition, which is checked by reason.

=== Ordination of women ===
A proposal to ordain women as priests was introduced and debated in 1995 after it had failed to secure a two-thirds majority in 1994. The ordination of women to the priesthood was approved by the two-thirds majority in 1996. The Church in Wales has ordained women as priests since 1997. Prior to 1997, women were permitted to serve as deacons. The first deaconess was consecrated in 1884. In 2013, the church voted to allow women to serve as bishops. In 2016, Joanna Penberthy was elected the first woman bishop in the church. Penberthy was enthroned as Bishop of St Davids on 11 February 2017. As of 2020, following the enthronement of Cherry Vann as Bishop of Monmouth, there were three women bishops, and three men bishops, sitting on the Welsh Bench of Bishops. This situation was maintained in 2021, with John Lomas having been elected as Bishop of Swansea and Brecon following the resignation of John Davies. In 2022, Stallard's consecration as Assistant Bishop of Bangor meant that a majority of the active bishops in the Church in Wales was female, a situation presumed to be a first in any Anglican church. Although a Twitter feed suggested that Stallard had joined the "Bench" of bishops, this was a loose use of terminology, as the "Bench" consists of the Archbishop and the other diocesan bishops.

=== Same-sex unions and LGBT clergy ===
Beginning in the 1980s, the Church in Wales embarked on an increasingly open stand on various issues including economic justice, the ordination of women and inclusion of homosexual people. In some areas, like human sexuality, the church establishment has faced resistance from congregations. In 2005, the church allowed gay priests to enter into civil partnerships. "In the wake of civil partnerships, the Welsh Bishops sought legal advice, and told gay partnered clergy that they were welcome, as well as gay ordination candidates." Speaking on such partnerships, it was communicated that "The Church in Wales has no formal view on whether people in civil partnerships who are in a sexual relationship can serve as clergy. If the issue arises, it is up to the relevant Bishop to decide." Therefore, the Welsh church does not require abstinence for clergy in civil unions. Regarding transgender issues, an officer announced that the church believes transgender people "should be acknowledged and celebrated in their new gender." Currently, "the Church has published prayers that may be said with a couple following the celebration of a [same-sex] civil partnership or civil marriage."

Currently, "the Church in Wales is much more liberal on this issue [than the Church of England]" and is discussing the possibility of blessing or performing same-sex marriages. In 2018, the Welsh Bishops released a statement saying it was "unjust" to not offer formal provision for same-sex marriages and civil partnerships. Following the bishops' announcement, the General Synod voted in favour of requesting formal provision for same-sex couples. The Welsh Church has decided to move forward with possibly offering same-sex marriage and blessing rites for same-sex unions. The Diocese of St Asaph provides a chaplaincy and services for LGBT people. Jeffrey John, who is openly gay and in a civil partnership, was nearly elected bishop of Llandaff when he "won more than half of a Church in Wales electoral college, but fell short of the two-thirds majority required." As of 2020, the Church in Wales has consecrated a bishop, Cherry Vann, who is openly lesbian and in a civil partnership.

"The Anglican Church in Wales took the first steps towards allowing clergy to celebrate same sex marriage in its churches when more than half its Governing Body voted in favour of the move." In the 2016 results, 52% of the Governing Body voted in favour of allowing same-sex marriages in church. "Members of the Church in Wales Governing Body voted 61 in favour of gay marriages in church, nine in favour of blessing gay partnerships and 50 for making no change." As a result of the majority support for same-sex couples, but not a two-thirds majority needed to create a same-sex marriage ceremony, the church's Bench of Bishops affirmed members in same-sex relationships and "published a series of prayers which may be said with a couple following the celebration of a civil partnership or civil marriage." The service, in Form One, gives God thanks "for [the two people] who have found such love and companionship in each other, that it has led them to dedicate their lives in support of one another." In September 2021, the Church in Wales voted to "formally bless same-sex couples" instead (by way of debate and compromise) – but still not legally recognising same-sex marriage within titles of the Church officially. In 2025, the Church in Wales elected Cherry Vann as the Archbishop of Wales, making her the first woman to serve as Archbishop in the United Kingdom and the first openly LGBTQ and partnered bishop to be a Primate within the Anglican Communion. In 2026, the blessings of same-sex couples were made permanent through a vote.

== Safeguarding ==
The Church in Wales describes safeguarding — the prevention of harm to children and adults at risk — as integral to its mission, with the welfare of children and adults at risk taking precedence over other considerations. Strategic oversight rests with the Safeguarding Committee, which reports to the Standing Committee of the Governing Body of the Church in Wales, while operational support is provided by the Provincial Safeguarding Team.

=== Policy and training ===
A revised provincial Safeguarding Policy was launched in November 2020, replacing the 2016 version. It separates the principles of safeguarding from procedural guidelines and applies to all clergy, staff and volunteers, lay or ordained. Training is delivered through St Padarn's Institute in three modules: Module A (Safeguarding Awareness), an online course mandatory for all clergy and church officers; Module B (Understanding Safeguarding in the Church), mandatory for clergy, Ministry Area Council members and churchwardens; and Module C (Safeguarding and Leadership), mandatory for clergy and Ministry Area Council members. Disclosure and Barring Service checks and training compliance are administered through an online dashboard, MyChurchPeople, introduced in response to recommendations from the Independent Inquiry into Child Sexual Abuse (IICSA).

=== IICSA findings ===
The Independent Inquiry into Child Sexual Abuse examined the Church in Wales as part of its Anglican Church investigation, reporting in 2020. The inquiry noted examples of good practice and observed that the Church's independent safeguarding body, which reviews complaints and disciplinary referrals, provided a measure of independence by not being tied to any one diocese. However, it found that the Church in Wales had no programme of external auditing and had therefore not been subject to independent scrutiny of its policies, and that record-keeping was poor or absent in a number of sampled cases. It also criticised inconsistency in how agreements permitting known offenders to worship in churches were arranged and monitored.

=== Anthony Pierce case and 2026 review ===
In 2025, Anthony Pierce, the former Bishop of Swansea and Brecon, was convicted of historical sexual offences against a child. The Church in Wales commissioned an independent external review by Gabrielle Higgins, published in February 2026, which found that complaints received by senior clergy in 1993 — including what the review described as an implicit admission by Pierce — were not passed to the police until 2010, and that no action had been taken at the time to safeguard the victim. The review found that a handwritten record of the 1993 complaint was not passed to Pierce's successor as Archbishop of Wales, Barry Morgan, with the result that key safeguarding information was unavailable in Wales for nearly a decade; Rowan Williams,

=== Ecumenical relations ===
Following the similar step taken by the Church of England in 1932, and other Anglican provinces, the Church in Wales entered into intercommunion with the Old Catholics in 1937. The Church in Wales has also been a member of the Porvoo Communion since September 1995. Due to the Anglo-Catholic dominance, relations with the Free Churches (formerly known during establishment times as Nonconformists), ecumenical progress has been slower in Wales than in England. The Church in Wales is a member of the Covenanted Churches in Wales. A covenant (with church unity as an ultimate goal) was signed by the Church in Wales, the Methodist Church, the Presbyterian Church of Wales, the United Reformed Church, and some Baptist churches in 1982 under the title of Enfys ("rainbow").

== See also ==
- Armorial of the Church in Wales
- Cytûn – Churches Together in Wales
- List of archdeacons in the Church in Wales
- List of Church in Wales churches
- Religion in Wales

== Sources ==
- Muss-Arnolt, William (1914). The Book of Common Prayer Among the Nations of the World: A History of Translations of the Prayer Book of the Church of England and of the Protestant Episcopal Church of America...a Study Based Mainly on the Collection of Josiah Henry Benton. London: Society for Promoting Christian Knowledge.
