= Richard Redman (bishop) =

15th and 16th-century Bishop of Ely, Bishop of Exeter, and Bishop of St Asaph

- Bishop of Ely
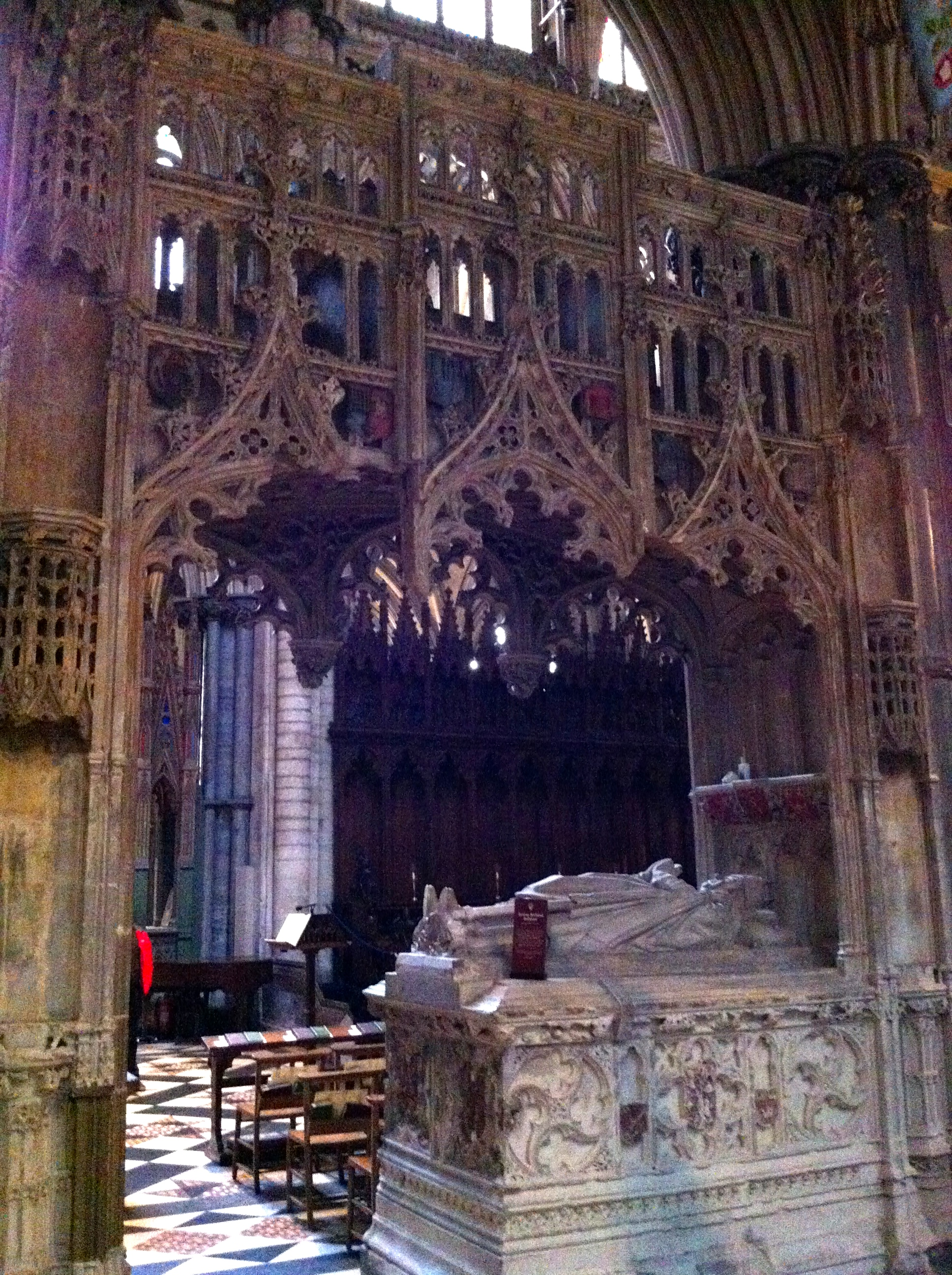
- Memorial to Bishop Richard Redman in Ely Cathedral
- Appointed: 26 May 1501
- Term ended: 24 August 1505
- Predecessor: John Alcock
- Successor: James Stanley
- Previous posts: Bishop of St Asaph; Bishop of Exeter

Orders
- Consecration: 13 October 1471

Personal details
- Died: 24 August 1505
- Denomination: Catholic

Richard Redman (died 1505) was a medieval Premonstratensian canon and abbot of Shap Abbey, Bishop of St Asaph, Bishop of Exeter, and Bishop of Ely, as well as the commissary-general for the Abbot of Prémontré between 1459 and his death.

Redman was consecrated as Bishop of St Asaph after 13 October 1471.

Redman was translated to Exeter on 6 November 1495.

Redman was then translated to Ely on 26 May 1501. He died while Bishop of Ely on 24 August 1505.

== Citations ==
Catholic Church titles
Preceded by Thomas Bird	Bishop of St Asaph; 1471–1495	Succeeded by Michael Deacon
Preceded by Oliver King	Bishop of Exeter; 1495–1501	Succeeded by John Arundel
Preceded by John Alcock	Bishop of Ely; 1501–1505	Succeeded by James Stanley
