= Owen Owen (priest) =

Welsh Anglican priest (c. 1536–1593)

- Church: Church of England
- Diocese: Diocese of Bangor
- Appointed: 1584
- Term ended: 1593
- Successor: Held in commendam by Bishops of Bangor

Personal details
- Born: c. 1536 Anglesey, Wales
- Died: 1593 Burton Latimer, Northamptonshire
- Buried: Burton Latimer
- Parents: Owen Owen of Bodfilin
- Spouse: Margaret Matthews (d. 1576); Jane Griffith
- Children: 8, including John Owen
- Education: Christ's College, Cambridge

Owen Owen (c. 1536 – 1593), also known as Owen Owens, was a Welsh Anglican priest and the last Archdeacon of Anglesey to hold the position pleno jure (in his own right). Following his death, the bishops of Bangor held the archdeaconry in commendam.

== Early life and education ==
Owen was born around 1536, the second son of Owen Owen of Bodfilin, Caernarfon. He was educated at Christ's College, Cambridge, where he graduated MA in 1564. He was incorporated at the University of Oxford on 21 February 1566.

== Church career ==
Owen was instituted as rector of Burton Latimer, Northamptonshire, on 29 November 1567, a position he retained until his death. In 1573 he became rector of Llangeinwen in Anglesey. He was appointed a canon of Bangor Cathedral in 1576.

Owen was appointed Archdeacon of Anglesey in 1584 and served until his death in 1593. He was notable as the last archdeacon to hold this position in his own right; from 1592 onwards, the bishops of Bangor assumed the archdeaconry as a commendam.

== Family ==
Owen married twice. His first wife was Margaret Matthews, who was buried at Burton Latimer on 18 December 1576. He subsequently married Jane, daughter of Robert Griffith, esquire, of Caernarfon, by whom he had five sons and three daughters.

His eldest son by his second marriage, John Owen (1580–1651), was baptised at Burton Latimer on 8 November 1580 and later became Bishop of St Asaph.

== Death ==
Owen died in early 1593 and was buried at Burton Latimer on 21 March 1593.
