= Manchester Cathedral =

Church in Manchester, England

Coordinates: 53°29′07″N 2°14′41″W

- Cathedral and Collegiate Church of St Mary, St Denys and St George
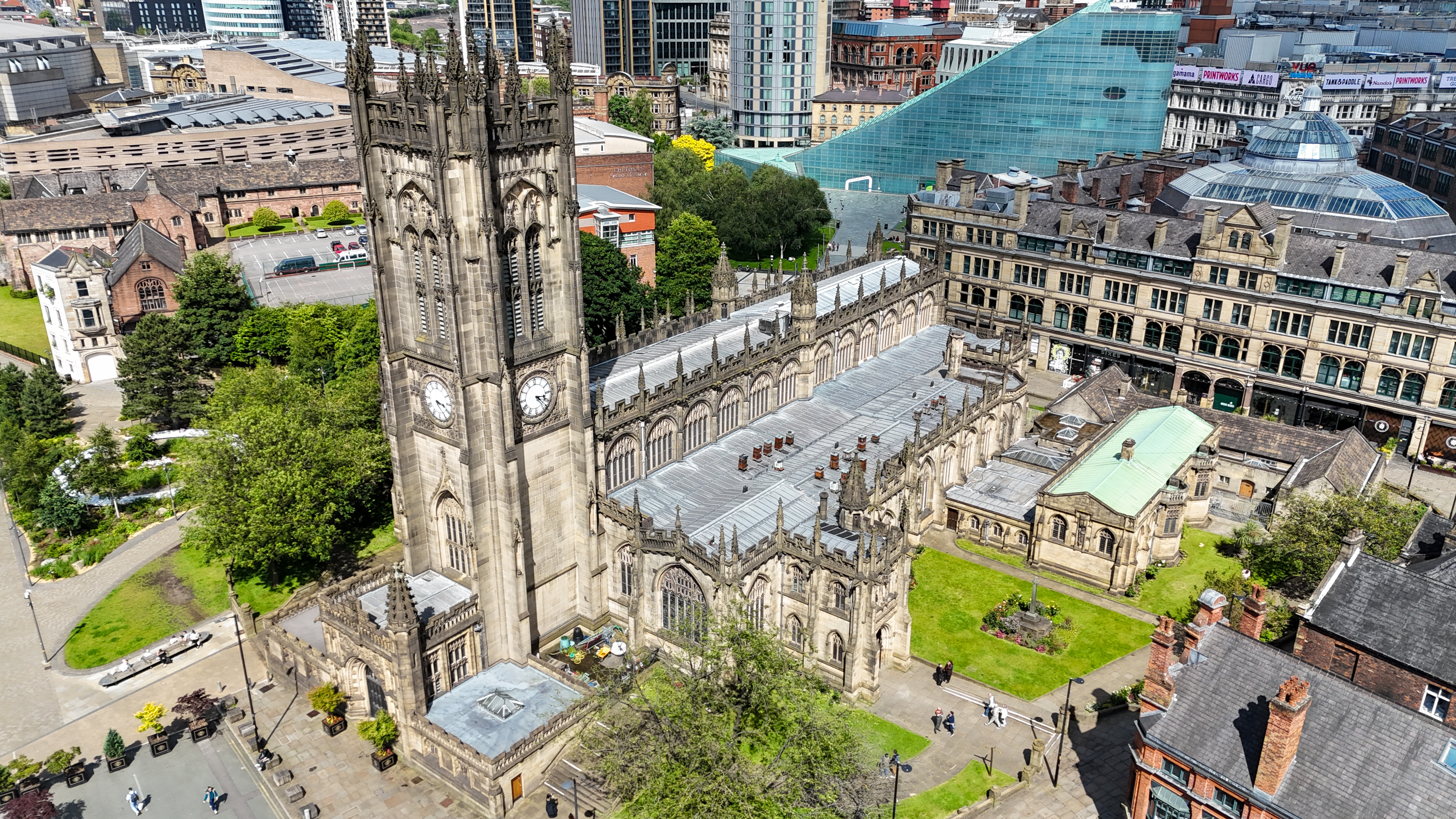
- Manchester Cathedral and skyline, 2024

- Shown within Greater Manchester
- OS grid reference: SJ 83881 98750
- Location: Victoria Street, Manchester M3 1SX
- Country: England
- Denomination: Church of England
- Previous denomination: Roman Catholic
- Tradition: Central churchmanship
- Website: Cathedral website

History
- Status: Active

Architecture
- Functional status: Active
- Heritage designation: Grade I listed
- Architectural type: Gothic Revival
- Style: Gothic (Perpendicular)
- Years built: 1421–1882

Administration
- Province: York
- Diocese: Manchester

Clergy
- Dean: Rogers Govender

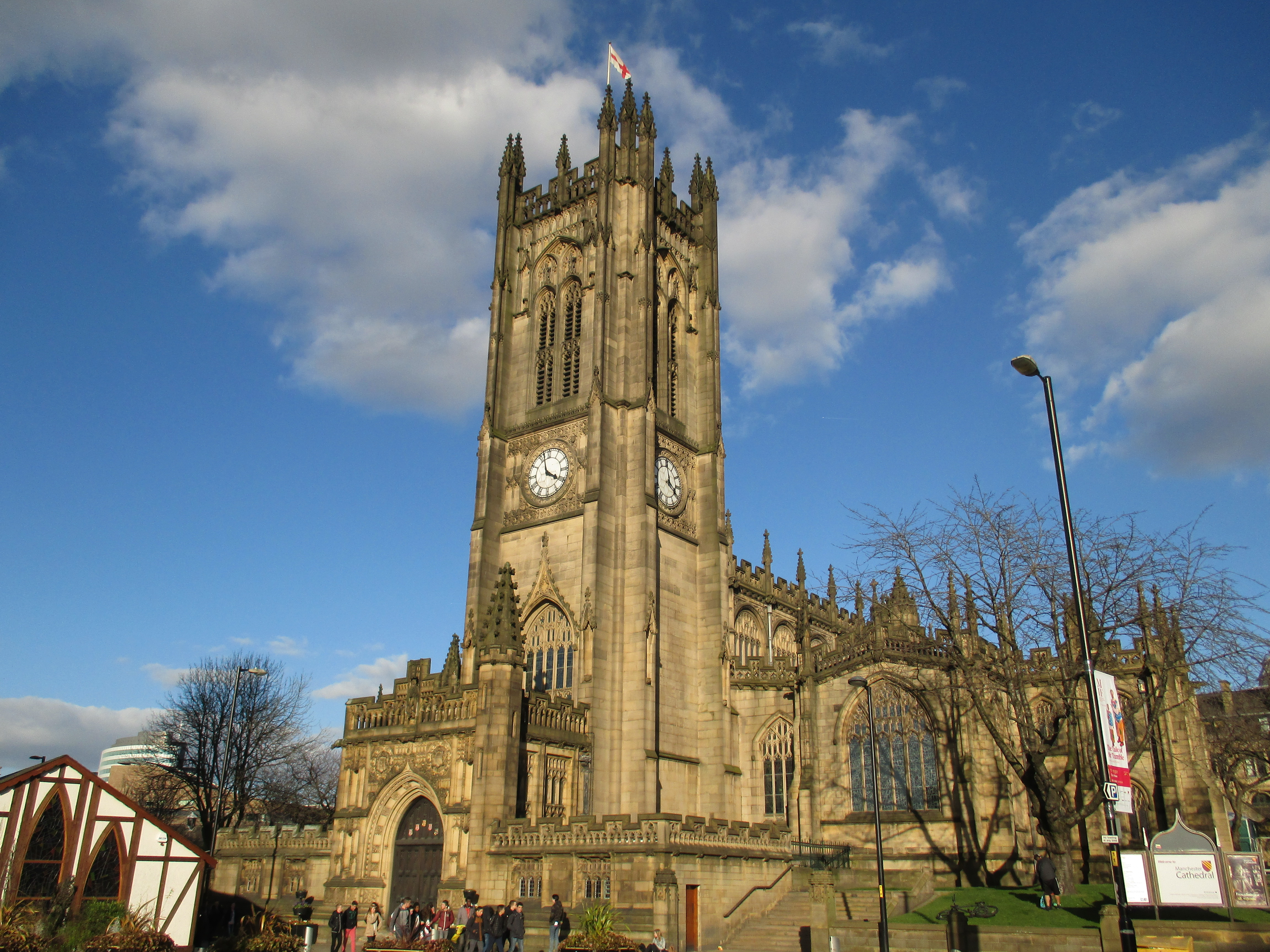
Manchester Cathedral from the front in 2015

Manchester Cathedral, formally the Cathedral and Collegiate Church of St Mary, St Denys and St George, (Note: The college governing the cathedral is titled the College of Christ in Manchester founded by King Charles.) in Manchester, England, is the mother church of the Anglican Diocese of Manchester, seat of the Bishop of Manchester and the city's parish church. It is on Victoria Street in Manchester city centre and is a grade I listed building.

The former parish church was rebuilt in the Perpendicular Gothic style in the years following the foundation of the collegiate body in 1421. Then at the end of the 15th century, James Stanley II (warden 1485–1506 and later Bishop of Ely 1506–1515) was responsible for rebuilding the nave and collegiate choir with high clerestory windows; also commissioning the late-medieval wooden internal furnishings, including the pulpitum, choir stalls and the nave roof supported by angels with gilded instruments. The collegiate church became the cathedral of the new Diocese of Manchester in 1847. It was extensively refaced, restored and extended in the Victorian period, and again following bomb damage during World War II. It is one of fifteen Grade I listed buildings in Manchester.

== History ==
=== Origins ===
The origins of Manchester's first churches are obscure. The Angel Stone, a small carving of an angel with a scroll, is preserved in the cathedral. It was discovered in the wall of the cathedral's south porch providing evidence of an earlier, possibly Anglo-Saxon, church. It has been dated to around 700 AD, however the Corpus of Anglo-Saxon sculpture dates the sculpture to the twelfth century. Its Latin inscription translates as "into thy hands, O Lord, I commend my spirit". The first church, possibly sited on or near the site of St Ann's Church, was destroyed by Danish invaders in 923 and a church dedicated to St Mary, built by King Edward the Elder, possibly where St Mary's Gate joins Exchange Street, was mentioned in the Domesday Book in 1086. The Domesday Book entry for Manchester reads "the Church of St Mary and the Church of St Michael hold one carucate of land in Manchester exempt from all customary dues except tax". (Note: It is thought St Michael's Church was on the site of St Michael and All Angels' Church in Ashton-under-Lyne.)

=== Parish church ===
Construction of the predecessor parish church between the Rivers Irk and Irwell and an ancient watercourse crossed by the Hanging Bridge started in 1215 within the confines of the Baron's Court beside the manor house on the site of Manchester Castle. The lords of the manor were the Grelleys whose coat of arms is still associated with the cathedral. The Grelleys acted as stewards, building and endowing the first chancery, the St Nicholas Chancery. In 1311, the Grelley estate passed by marriage to the de la Warres. In 1349 the St Nicholas Chancery was endowed by the de Traffords. In 1382 Thomas de la Warre became its rector.

The church had a six-bay aisled nave and six-bay chancel with aisles and a west tower in the perpendicular style of the late-medieval period.

=== Collegiate church ===
Thomas de la Warre became Baron de la Warre in 1398. A priest for more than 50 years, he was granted a licence from King Henry V and Pope Martin V to establish a collegiate church in Manchester in 1421. The college was established by royal charter, with a warden, eight fellows, four singing clerks and eight choristers. The parish church was dedicated to St Mary and to that dedication were added St George, the patron saint of England, and St Denys, the patron saint of France, perhaps reflecting de la Warre's French heritage, or Henry V's claim to the French throne. The college of priests was housed in new buildings on the site of the former manor house that survive as Chetham's Library paid for by de la Warre. He appointed John Huntingdon as the college's first warden who, between 1422 and 1458, rebuilt the eastern arm of the parish church to provide the collegiate choir. Huntington's monumental brass (much restored) is laid on the chancel floor. Huntington is also commemorated in Victorian rebus, carvings of a man hunting and a man with a tun (barrel of ale), on either side of the arch accessing the Lady Chapel. The church's 14th-century west tower and Lady Chapel were incorporated into the current structure although little or no fabric of that date is still visible, and the Lady Chapel was lost in 1940.

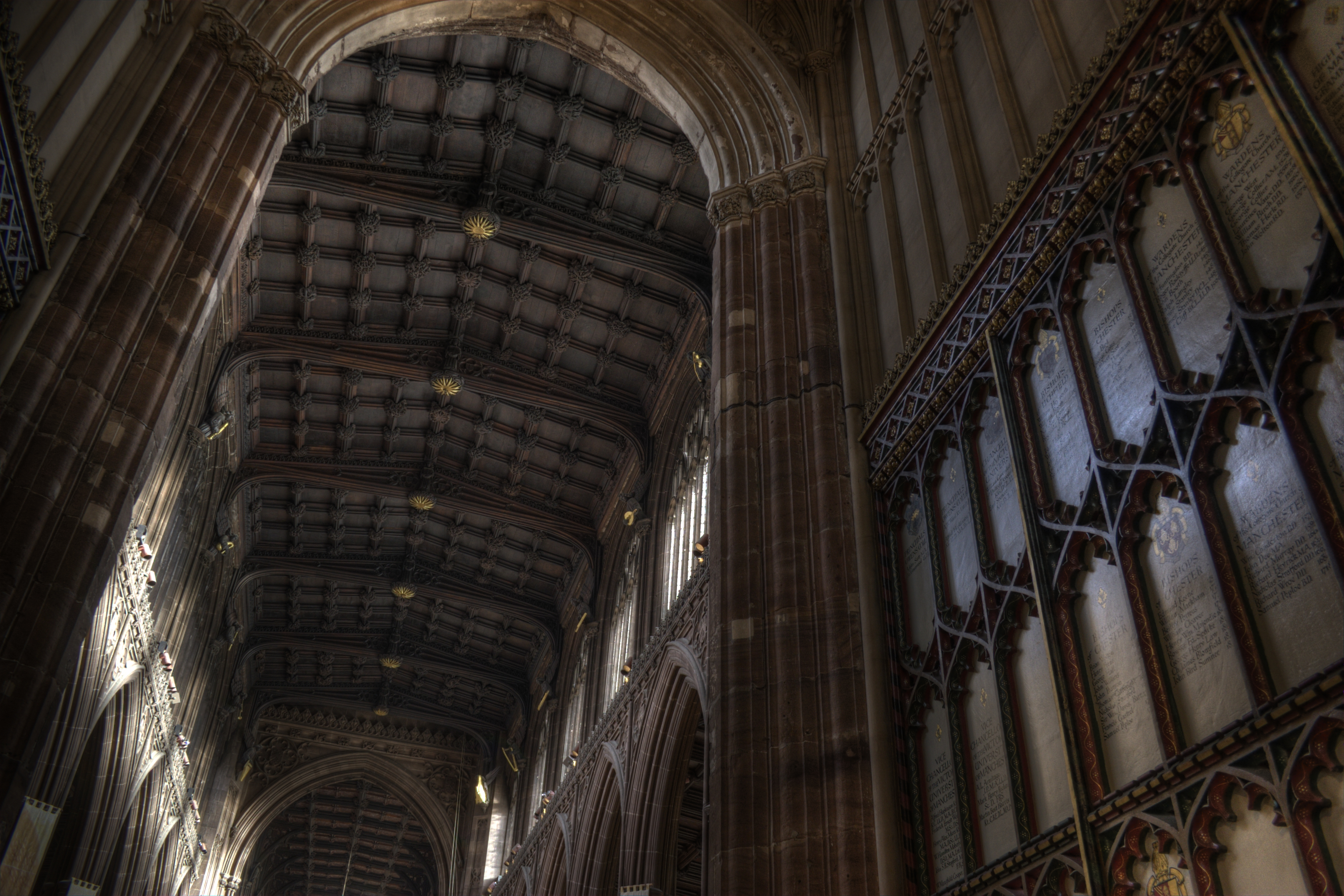
The nave roof supported by angel minstrels viewed from the west door

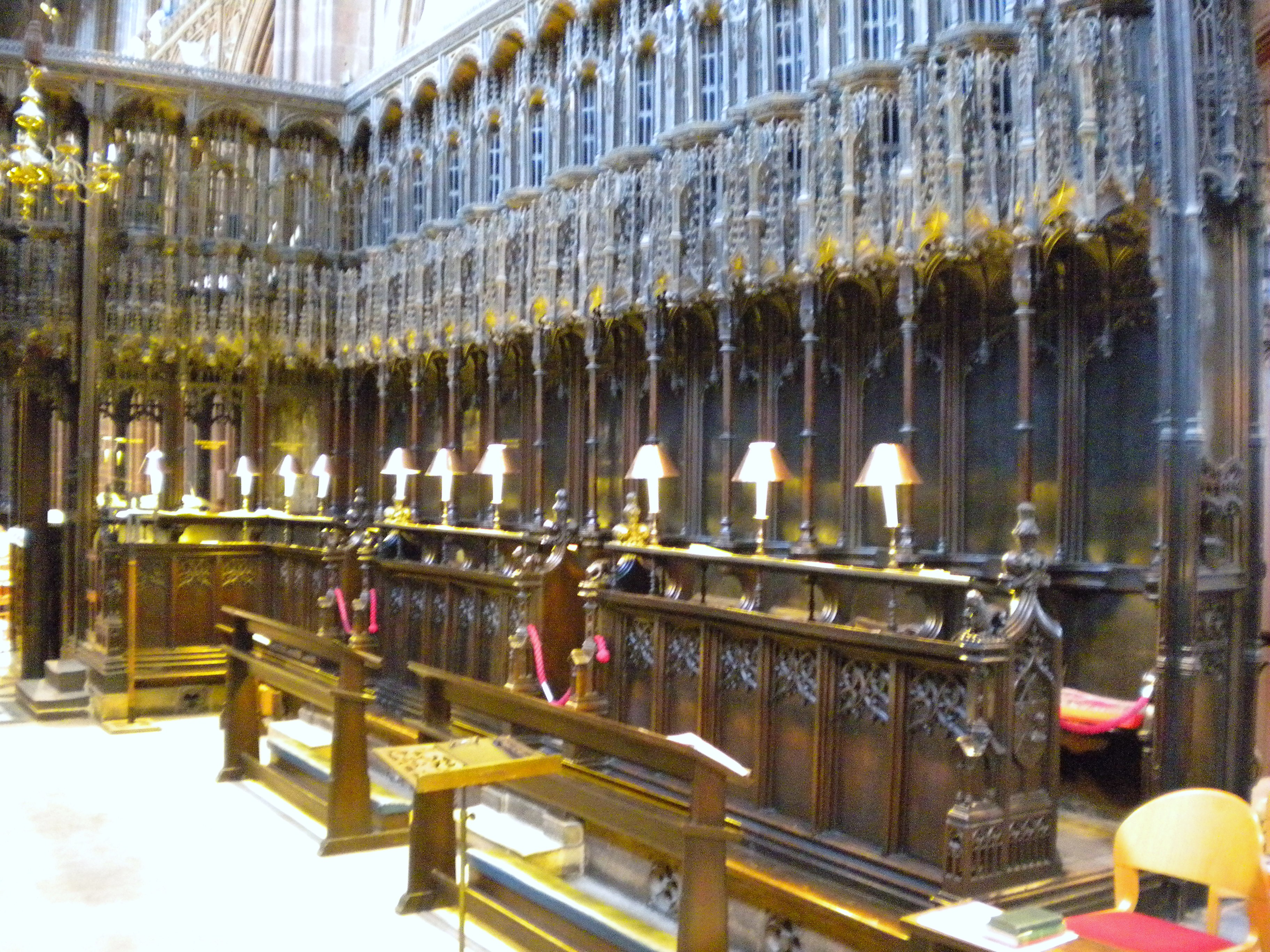
The choir stalls

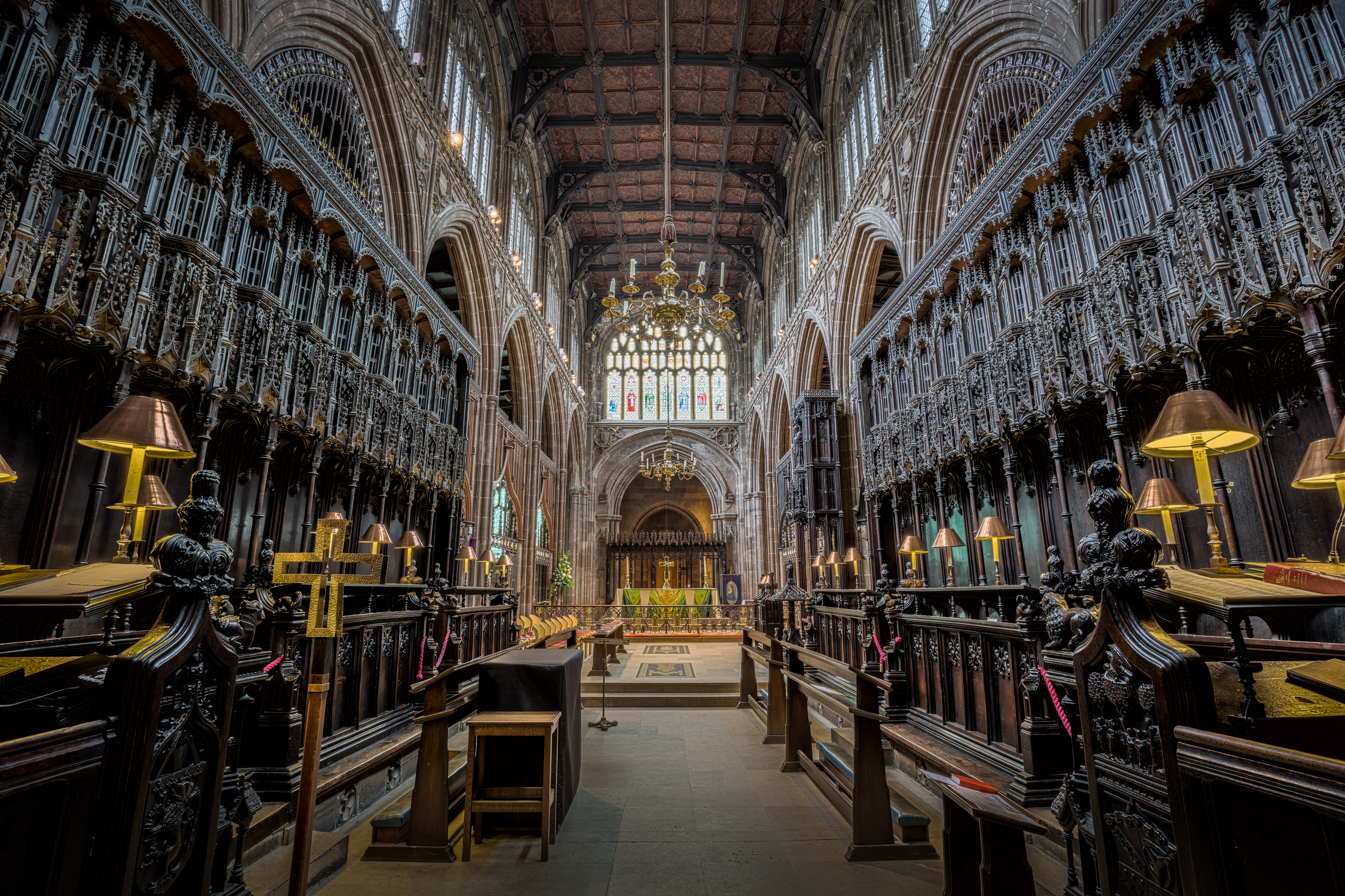
Collegiate chancel, designed by John Wastell

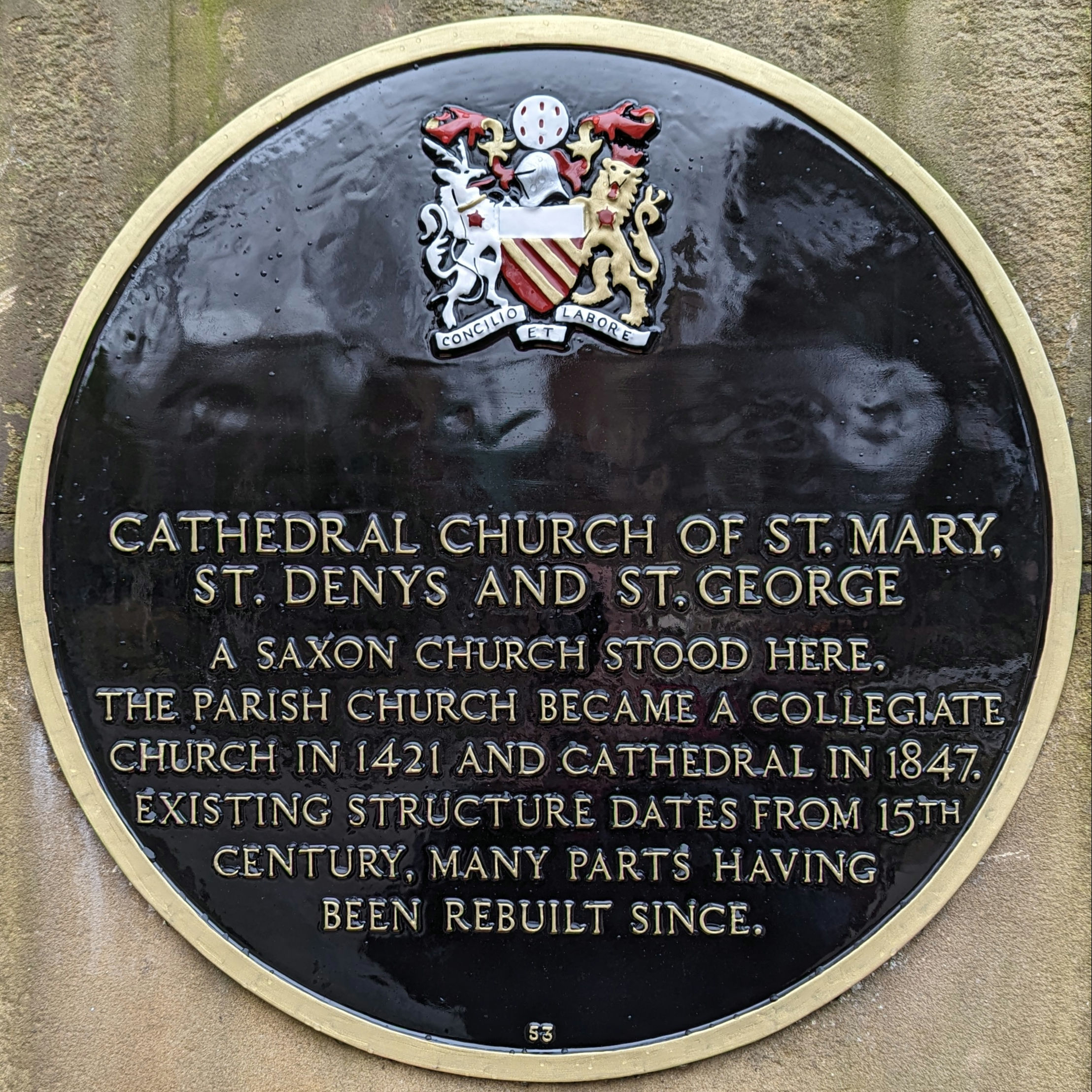
Plaque at the cathedral entrance

Traditionally the third warden, Ralph Langley (1465–1481), is credited with rebuilding the nave but the nave and choir were substantially reconstructed again by James Stanley II (1485–1506) a few years later, when he raised the clerestory and provided the richly decorated timber roofs and choir stalls. James's stepmother, Lady Margaret Beaufort was mother of Henry VII and through their alliance with the Tudor dynasty the Stanleys acquired both fabulous wealth and access to architects and craftsmen working on royal commissions. On stylistic grounds, the chancel arcades and clerestory of the cathedral are attributed to John Wastell, the architect for the completion of Kings College Chapel, Cambridge. The choir stalls, carved at the workshop of William Brownflet of Ripon, are the finest of a series which includes the surviving stalls at Ripon Cathedral, Beverley Minster and Bridlington Priory. The carving of the misericord seats is exceptionally fine. James Stanley was responsible for the embellishment of the nave roof with supports in the form of fourteen life-size angel minstrels; and for the endowment of his own chantry chapel (now destroyed) near the north-east corner, in which he was buried in 1515.

The college was dissolved in 1547 in the reign of Edward VI by the Chantries Act, but refounded by his sister Mary I in 1553. Its future was uncertain when Elizabeth I succeeded in 1558, but was assured when she granted a new charter in 1578, allowing a warden, four fellows, two chaplains, four singing men and four choristers. The dedication of the college (but not the church) was changed to the college of Christ. Manchester and Southwell Minster were the only two medieval collegiate foundations where daily choral worship was maintained after the Reformation until they were joined by Ripon when its collegiate foundation was restored in 1607. John Dee, magus and astrologer for Elizabeth I was warden from 1595 to 1608 and occupied the wardens' lodgings now incorporated into Chetham's Library. The present charter, the fourth, was granted by Charles I preserving the dedication of the college to Christ.

==== Chantry chapels ====
In the early 16th century an almost complete sequence of chantry chapels was constructed along the north and south sides of the church creating a double aisle around the parochial nave, which is consequently much wider than it is long. Manchester is commonly claimed to have the widest nave of any cathedral in England. On the south side, the oldest of the chantry chapels, the St Nicholas Chapel, was rebuilt by the de Traffords in 1470. St George's Chapel was endowed by William Galley in 1503 and Richard Beswick endowed the Jesus Chapel in 1506. On the north side, William Radcliffe of Ordsall Hall endowed the Holy Trinity Chapel in the northwest corner in 1498. Huntington left money and land for the St James' Chapel which was built in 1507. The largest of the chantries, the St John the Baptist Chapel, was begun by James Stanley the Bishop of Ely in 1513. The attached funerary chapel for James Stanley, the Ely Chapel, was destroyed by bombing in 1940. The brass from atop Stanley's tombchest was rescued from the wreckage, and remounted vertically against the rebuilt north wall of the Regiment Chapel.

The western chapels are no longer demarcated, as the screens that divided them have been removed giving the appearance of double aisles on either side of the nave.

==== Batch marriages ====
Until 1850, the Collegiate Church remained the parish church for the whole of Manchester (this is the ancient parish, including almost the whole area of the modern City of Manchester excepting Wythenshawe), an area which in 1821 had a population of 187,031. Within this vast parish there were considerable numbers of chapels of ease and proprietary chapels for parochial worship – as well as other chapels for dissenters and Roman Catholics. Nevertheless, the Wardens and fellows of the Collegiate church maintained their legal right to a fee of 3s. 6d. for all marriages conducted within their parish; so, unless a couple were able and willing to pay two sets of marriage fees, the only place in Manchester where a marriage might legally be contracted was the collegiate church. In practice, this religious duty fell on the pastoral chaplain employed by the Warden and fellows; who from 1790 to 1821 was the eccentric figure of the Revd. Joshua 'Jotty' Brookes. In 1821 a total of 1,924 marriages were solemnized in the collegiate church; commonly in batches of a score or more. The couples to be married were most often desperately poor but Brookes was no respecter of status, so all were subjected to his 'production line' methods. Commonly, the groom and friends would decamp to a nearby ale-house while the bride kept place in the queue; but if there was one groom too few when a group of couples were lined up in front of the altar, Brookes notoriously would countenance no delay, but would continue the marriage with any passer-by (or even one of the other grooms) as a proxy stand-in. Brookes is commonly reckoned to have conducted more marriages, funerals and christenings than any English clergyman before or since.

As the population of Manchester increased further; so the numbers of christenings, weddings and funerals celebrated in the collegiate church also grew. In 1838, there were 5,164 christenings, 1,457 funerals, and 2,615 weddings.

=== Cathedral ===
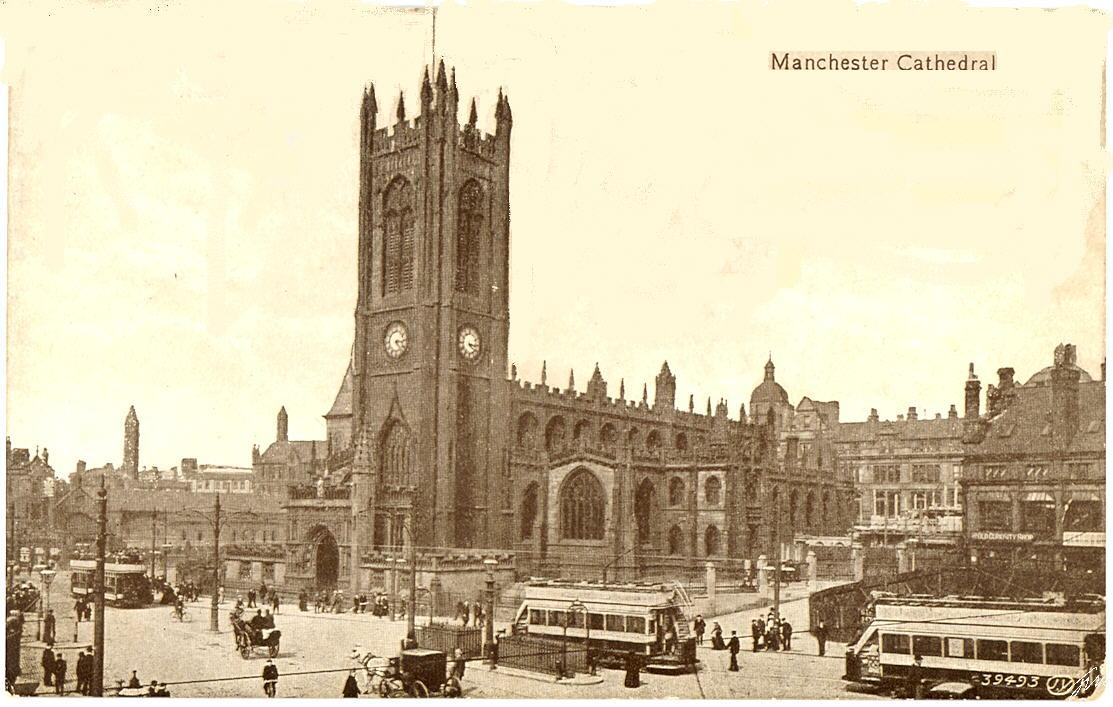
Manchester Cathedral in 1903

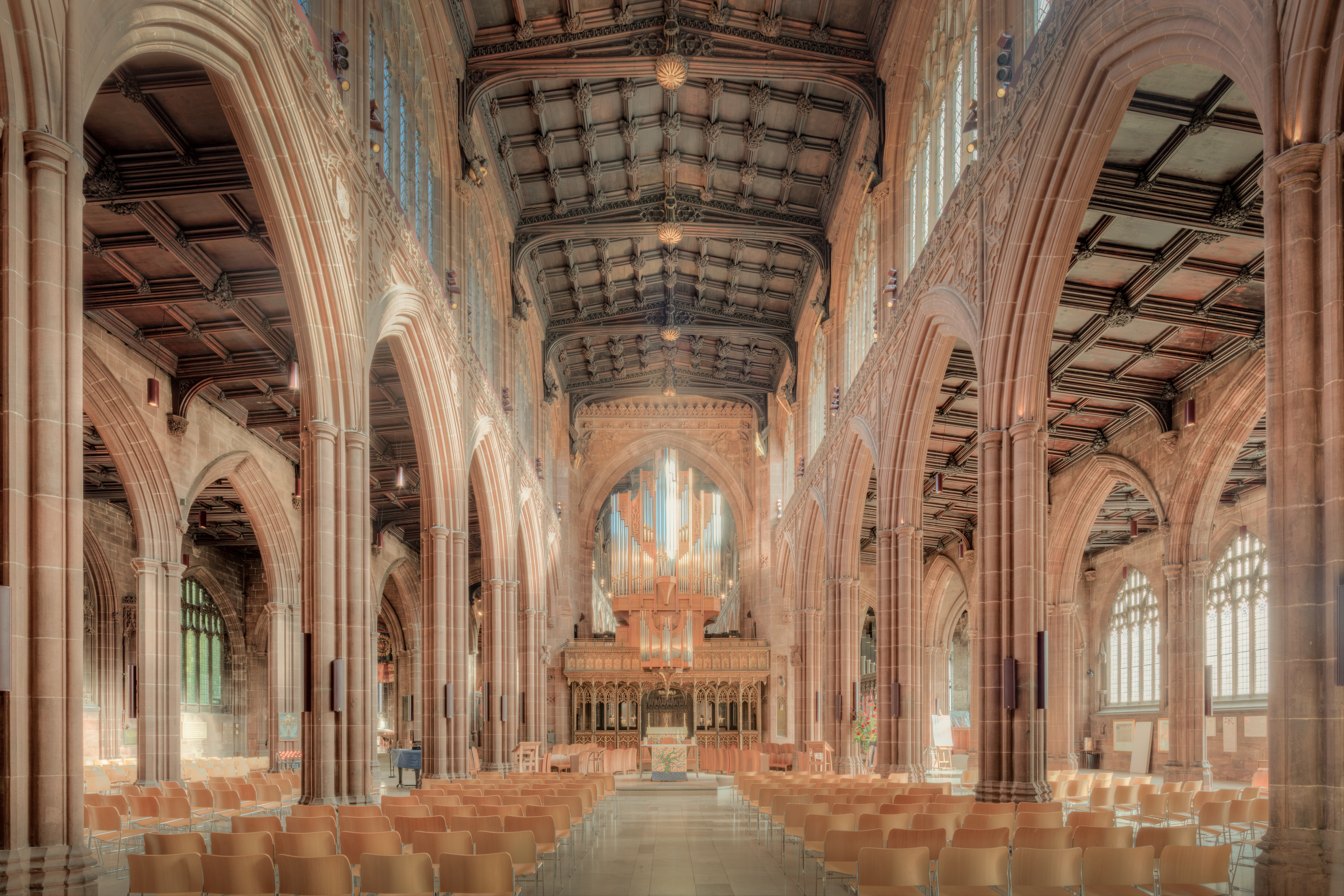
A view of the nave inside Manchester Cathedral since 2016, showing the Stoller organ over the pulpitum

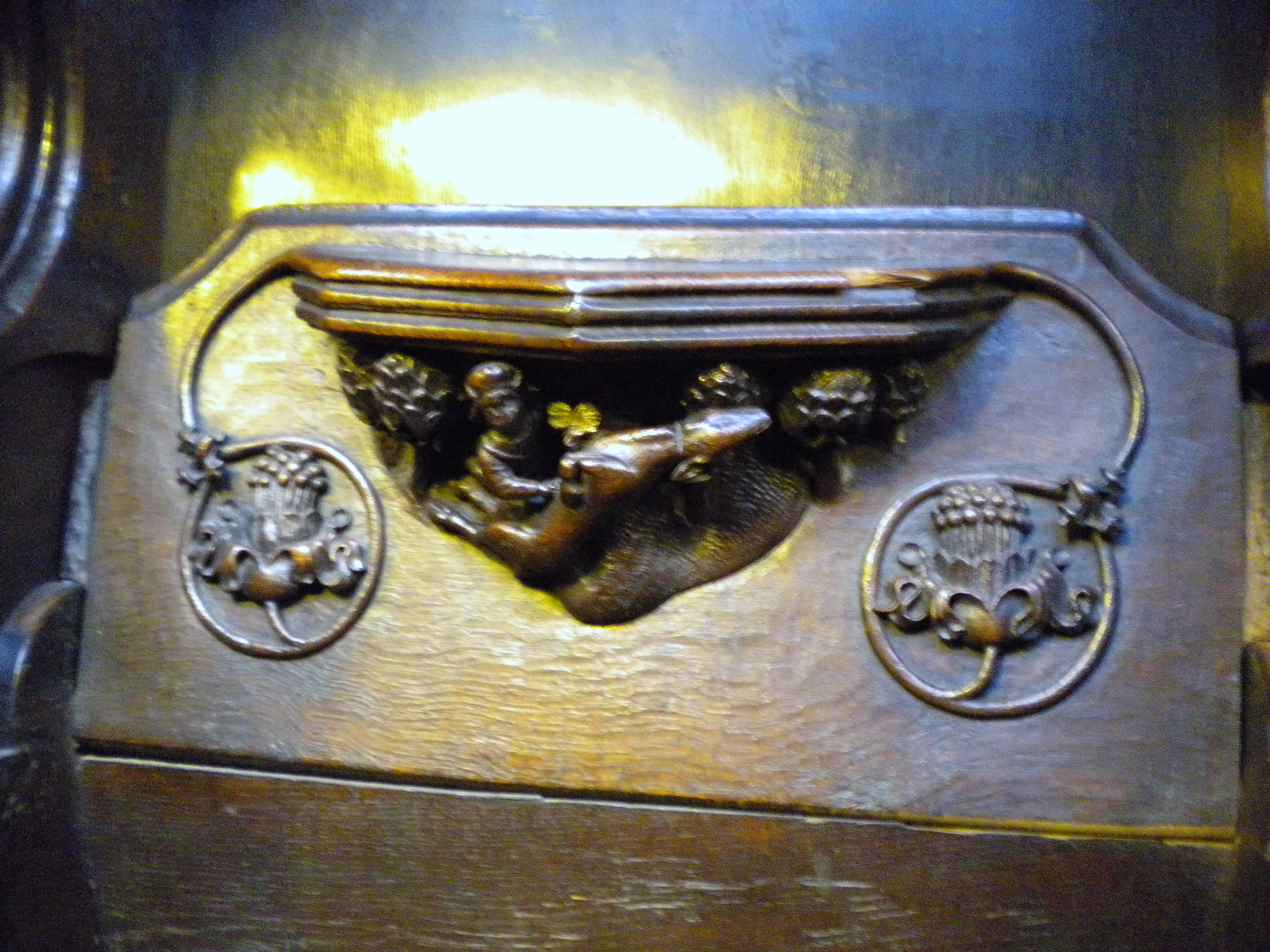
A misericord carving, depicting a hunter gutting a stag

Under the Ecclesiastical Commissioners Act 1840, the warden and fellows of the collegiate church were translated into a dean and canons in preparation for becoming the cathedral of the new Diocese of Manchester which came into effect in 1847. Initial proposals for a new cathedral to be built to the designs of R. C. Carpenter on Piccadilly Gardens were not proceeded with. The building was extensively renovated in 1882.

During the Manchester Blitz in 1940, a German bomb exploded a few yards from the north-east corner, severely damaging the cathedral roofs and demolishing the medieval lady chapel and James Stanley's chantry chapel. All stained-glass windows were blown out, the organ-case over the pulpitum was destroyed, and the medieval choir stalls toppled inwards so as to meet one another. It took almost 20 years to complete the repairs, in the course of which the Lady Chapel was rebuilt to the designs of Hubert Worthington and the St John the Baptist Chapel was refitted as the regimental chapel for the Manchester Regiment. The cathedral was again damaged in the IRA bombing in June 1996.

The cathedral houses extensive parish and historical archives, dating back to 1421. In 2003, a project began to provide an exhaustive catalogue of the archive's contents to the public. The cathedral was granted Grade I listed building status in January 1952. Grade I structures are considered to be "buildings of exceptional interest".

== Architecture ==
The cathedral is constructed of three types of stone. The walls and internal piers were originally constructed in a dark purple-brown Collyhurst sandstone formed in the Early Permian period. This is now visible only in the tower arch of the nave, in the interior of the Jesus Chapel and in the chancel; as in the early 19th century all the surfaces of the nave and aisles were scored to be encased in Roman Cement. This damaged the structure so severely that most internal and external stonework had to be replaced in the later 19th century restorations in buff-grey Fletcher Bank Grit from Ramsbottom. The nave floors have, since the 1960s, been relaid in limestone from the Peak District which contains crinoid fossils.

=== Restorations ===
By the 1840s the external and internal stonework was in a poor state, partly due to the poor weathering qualities of the Collyhurst sandstone, but also because of an ill-advised attempt to lighten the interior by coating the internal surfaces of the nave with Roman cement by John Palmer. The external stonework was replaced between 1850 and 1870 in a restoration by J. S. Crowther, who also replaced the internal stonework of the nave walls and arcades with exact reproductions of the originals. The west tower was heightened in 1868 by J.P. Holden, who also replaced its external stonework. Basil Champneys added the vestry, canons' library and western porches in 1898; while Percy Worthington provided further accommodation to the South-east, originally as a choir school, but subsequently converted to offices. Consequently, the cathedral gives the impression of being a 19th-century structure.

To accommodate upgrading work on the cathedral's heating system, in 2013 a temporary wooden cathedral was built on Victoria Street to allow worship to take place.

=== Furniture ===
==== Angel minstrels ====
The nave roof brackets are supported by fourteen angel sculptures, each playing a different late medieval instrument, believed to be the gift of James Stanley II.

South side (from the east):

Portative organ, harp, psaltery (plucked), dulcimer (played with hammers), lute, fithele, hurdy-gurdy

North side (from the east):

clavicymbal, trumpet, shawm, Scots pipes (mouth-blown), Irish pipes (bellows-blown), recorder, tabor

It is supposed that, in the 19th century restoration of the nave, the clavicymbal and organ were inadvertently transposed; as otherwise the south side has stringed instruments, and the north side mostly wind instruments. Only the organ presents an instrument that would commonly have been heard in church in the early 16th century; the other instruments would have been more typically used to accompany secular songs and dances. All these instruments, however, might well have been heard accompanying mystery play performances in the street, and in popular religious processions.

==== Misericords ====
The cathedral has thirty 16th-century misericords, considered to be among the finest in Europe. They are similar in style to those at Ripon Cathedral and Beverley Minster. Although Manchester's are of a later date, they were probably carved by the same school at Ripon. One of the most notable is N-08, the earliest known depiction of backgammon in the UK.

==== Stained glass ====
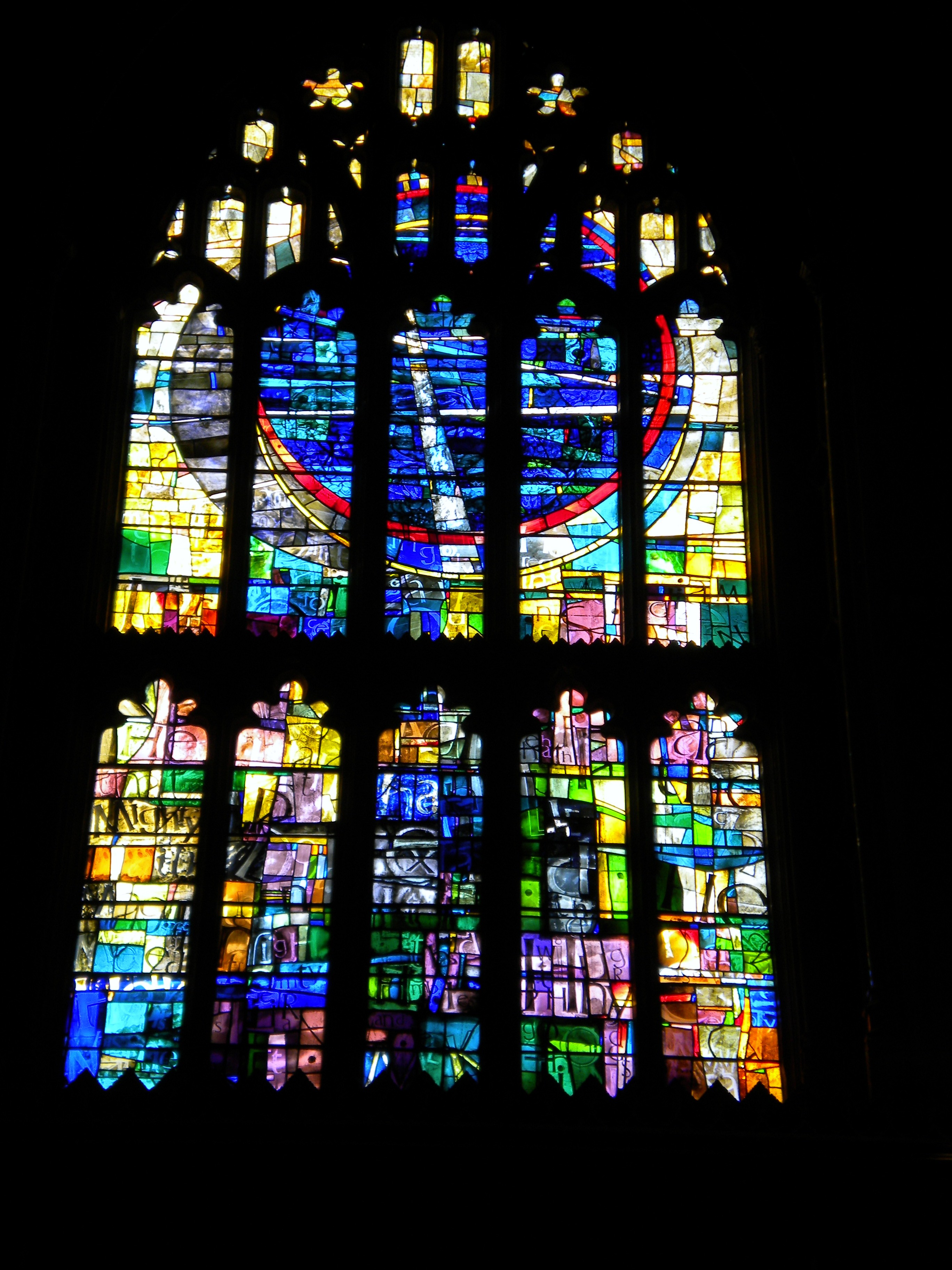
St Mary Window, Tony Hollaway (1980)

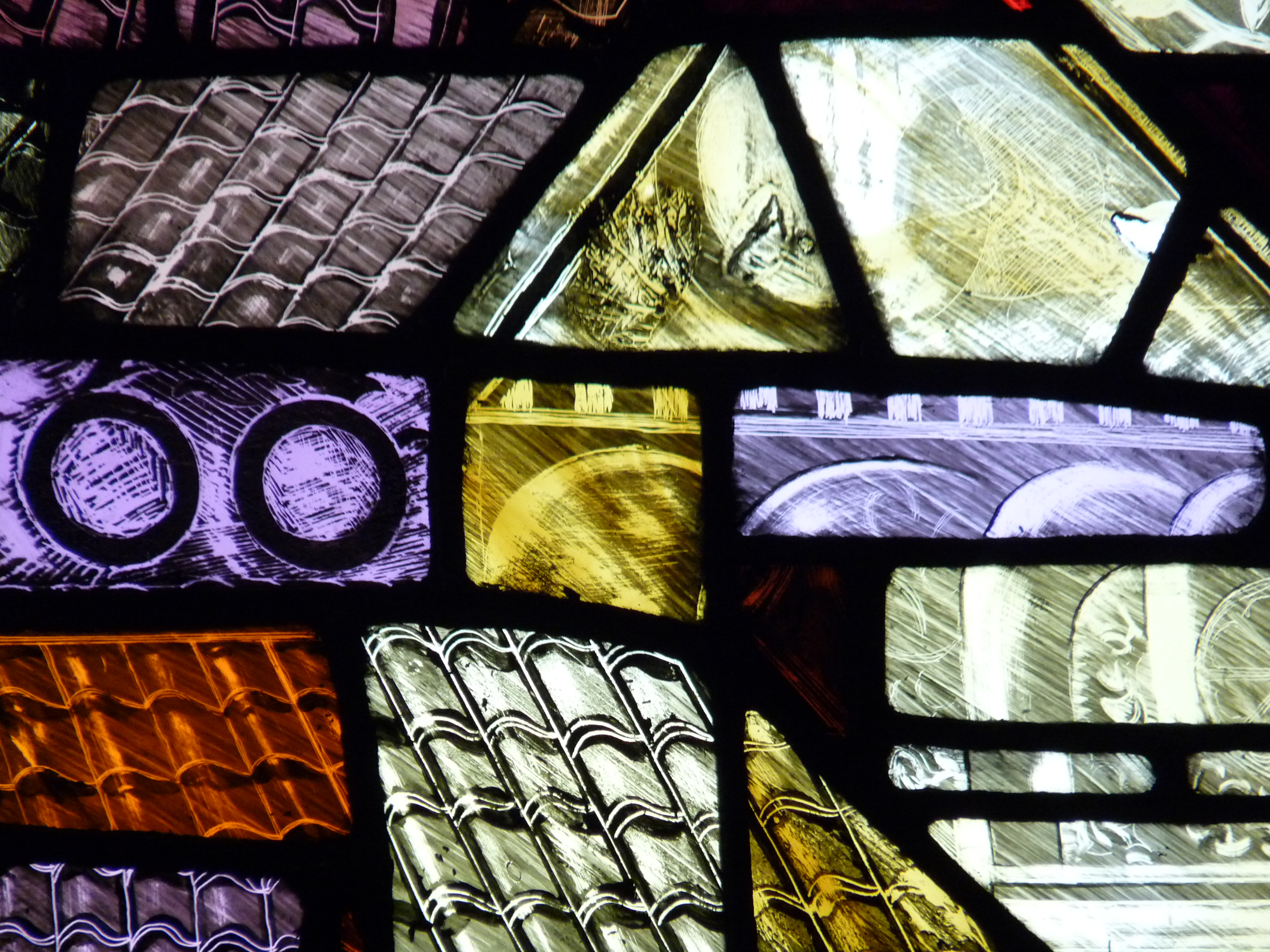
Detail of modern stained glass in the cathedral; the St Denys window

All the Victorian stained glass was destroyed during the Manchester Blitz in 1940. Until the late 1960s, only two windows had been replaced, notably the Fire Window by Margaret Traherne (1966). The dean and chapter commissioned Tony Hollaway to prepare a scheme for reglazing the cathedral, with priority to the five western windows: St George (1973), St Denys (1976), St Mary (1980), The Creation (1991) and The Apocalypse (1995). To commemorate the restoration of the cathedral following an IRA bomb in 1996, the Healing Window by Linda Walton was installed in 2004.

==== Bells ====
The ten bells in the cathedral tower hung for change ringing were cast by Gillett & Johnston of Croydon in 1925, and dedicated on 10 November that same year. The tenor (largest) bell weighs 1.3 tonnes and the bells are tuned to the key of D. The bells are rung for church service on Sunday mornings and on special occasions including a visit by Elizabeth II to distribute the Royal Maundy. One of the recipients was the tower captain, Roland Eccles, for 35 years of service to ringing and the cathedral community. On 10 November 2025, the centenary of the bells' dedication, a fundraising campaign to re-hang and augment the bells was launched.

== Dean and chapter ==
As of 28 July 2024:

- Dean — Rogers Govender (since 14 January 2006)
- Precentor and Sub Dean— Ian Jorysz
- Canon Missioner — Grace Thomas
- Archdeacon of Rochdale (Diocesan Canon) — Karen Smeeton

== In literature ==
Letitia Elizabeth Landon's poetical illustration, Collegiate Church, Manchester, to an engraving of a picture of the interior by Thomas Allom was published in Fisher's Drawing Room Scrap Book, 1833.

== Visitor centre ==
The visitor centre by the cathedral's south porch costing £3 million was opened by Elizabeth II. It has a shop and an exhibition room. The main attraction is the 15th-century Hanging Bridge, a scheduled monument, that was once the main approach to the church but was buried for more than 100 years.

== Music ==
=== Organ ===
In the course of the 19th century restorations of the interior, the cathedral was provided with an organ mounted over the medieval pulpitum in an elaborate case designed by George Gilbert Scott. This instrument was destroyed in the Christmas Blitz of 1940, and was replaced in 1952 with an organ built into the north and south choir aisles. In 2016, this organ was itself replaced by an entirely new instrument, once again mounted over the pulpitum, and funded from the Stoller foundation. The new organ case and letterings were designed by Stephen Raw.

Details of the former Hill organ installed in 1871

Details of the former Harrison organ installed in 1952

Current Tickell 'Stoller' organ installed in 2016 over the pulpitum screen, from the National Pipe Organ Register

=== Organists ===
Organist and Master of the Choristers: Christopher Stokes. Sub Organist: Benjamin Collyer.

Notable previous organists include Edward Betts (d.1767), Joseph John Harris (1848–1869), Frederick Bridge (1869–75), Sydney Nicholson (1908–1919), Norman Cocker (1943–1954), Allan Wicks (1954–1962) and Gordon Stewart (1981–1992).

=== Choir ===
The 1421 foundation statutes of the collegiate church provided for an endowed choir of lay clerks and singing boys; and these endowments were renewed when the college was refounded after the Reformation. However, although from the 17th century, there were two grammar schools close by - Manchester Grammar School and Chetham's Hospital School - there was, until the 20th century no provision for a choir school; dedicated choir school premises only being constructed by Percy Worthington in 1934. This school did not resume following war damage; so in 1969, when Chetham's School was refounded as a dedicated school of music, scholarships were established to enable boys aged 8–13 to serve the cathedral choir. These scholarships were subsequently modified in the 1970s, so as to support both girls' and boys' voices; the first statutory choir in the Church of England to make this change. There are now places for 20 choristers and 6 lay clerks.

== See also ==
- Controversy over the usage of Manchester Cathedral in Resistance: Fall of Man
- Grade I listed churches in Greater Manchester
- History of Manchester
- List of churches in Greater Manchester
- List of works by J. S. Crowther
- Listed buildings in Manchester-M3
- Manchester Cathedral Steps
