= Dafydd ab Owain =

Dafydd ab Owain may refer to:

- Dafydd ab Owain Gwynedd (c. 1145–1203), Prince of Gwynedd
- Dafydd ab Owain (bishop), bishop of St Asaph, 1503–1512
