= John Batmanson =

Religious leader in London (died 1531)

John Batmanson (died 1531), was prior of the Charterhouse in London.

Batmanson studied theology at Oxford, but there is no evidence of his having taken a degree in that faculty, 'though supplicate he did to oppose in divinity.' Whether the John Batemanson, LL.D., who was sent to Scotland in 1509 to receive James IV's oath to a treaty with England, and who acted on several commissions to examine cases of piracy in the north of England from that date until 1516, is the same man, is doubtful, but probable, as the name is by no means a common one.

In 1520 he was already a Carthusian, and was employed by Edward Lee (afterwards archbishop of York) in connection with his critical attack upon Erasmus. Erasmus (from whose letters we learn this fact) gives a spiteful sketch of his character—'unlearned, to judge from his writings, and boastful to madness.' In 1523, according to Tanner, on the authority of a manuscript belonging to Bishop Moore, he was prior of the Charterhouse of Hinton in Somerset; but his name has escaped the researches of Dugdale and his later editors, both in connection with Hinton and London. On the death of William Tynbigh, prior of the London Charterhouse, in 1529, Batmanson was elected to succeed him.

He died on 16 November 1531, and was buried in the convent chapel. This is the date given by Theodore Petre, the biographer of the Carthusians. If the statement of Maurice Chauncy, a contemporary of Batmanson's, that his successor Houghton, who was executed for refusing the oath of supremacy, died on 4 May 1535, 'in the fifth year of his priorate,’ be correct, Batmanson must have resigned the office some months before his death. The character given of him varies with the opinions of the writer. Pits and Petre speak of his great learning and angelic life, while Bale calls him supercilious and arrogant, and fond of quarrelling, though he allows that he was a clear writer. The only incident of his rule that has come down to us shows him in a favourable light. One of his monks was so affected by the solitary life that he was on the point of committing suicide when the prior discharged him from the order.

== Works ==
- 'In Cantica Canticorum,’ lib. i.
- 'In Salamonis Proverbia,’ lib. i.
- 'In Evangelium illud "Missus est",’ lib. i.
- 'De Christo duodenni, Homilia una (Cum factus esset Jesus annorum duodecim).’
- 'Institutiones Novitiorum,’ lib. i.
- 'De Contemptu Mundi,’ lib. i.
- 'De unica Magdalena, contra Fabrum Stabulensem,’ lib. i.
- 'Contra annotationes Erasmi Rotterdami,’ lib. i.
- 'Contra quædam Scripta Martini Lutheri,’ lib. i.
- 'Retractatio quorundam Scriptorum suorum,’ lib. i.

None of these appear to exist in print, or in any of the more important collections of manuscripts in England.
