= Dafydd ab Owain (bishop) =

Welsh abbot and bishop

Dafydd ab Owain (also David ab Owen; died 11 or 12 February 1512 or 1513) was a Welsh abbot and bishop. His family were from the Glasgoed area of Meifod, Powys. He studied at Oxford, graduating with a qualification in canon and civil law. He is thought to have taken his doctorate in law.

He was an abbot of Strata Marcella, and of Strata Florida, as well as of Aberconwy at Maenan (sometime after of 1489) where he continued after his appointment to the bishopric of St Asaph in December 1503. He held this office until his death.

Many of the Welsh poets of the time, such as Bedo Brwynllys, Dafydd Amharedudd ap Tudur, Guto'r Glyn and Hywel Rheinallt, praised his scholarship and learning.

He was buried near the altar in St Asaph Cathedral.

Religious titles
| Preceded by Dafydd ab Ieuan ab Iorwerth | Bishop of St Asaph; 1503–1512 | Succeeded by Edmund Birkhead |
