= George Griffith (bishop) =

Welsh bishop

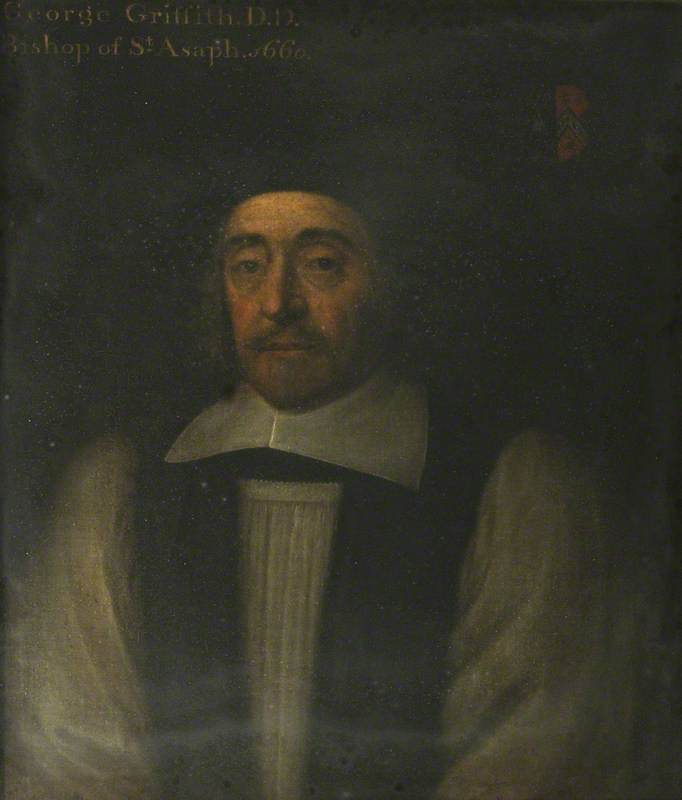
Bishop Griffith

George Griffith (30 September 1601 – 28 November 1666), was Bishop of St. Asaph.

Griffith was born at Penrhyn in Carnarvonshire on 30 September 1601, and was educated at Westminster School, whence he proceeded to Oxford and became a Westminster student of Christ Church, Oxford in 1619. He proceeded B.A. in 1623, and M.A. in 1626, and became distinguished as a tutor at his college and a popular preacher. He became domestic chaplain to Bishop John Owen of St. Asaph, who made him a canon of St. Asaph and rector of Newtown, Montgomeryshire, in 1631. In 1632 he gave up Newtown for the rectories of Llandrinio and Llanfechain, also on the presentation of his patron. In 1633 he surrendered Llanfechain for the richer rectory of Llanymynech. In 1635 he proceeded D.D. In 1640, as a proctor in convocation, he urged the necessity of a new edition of the Welsh Bible, none having been published since that of Bishop Parry in 1620.

Griffith was not ejected from Llanymynech by the parliamentary commissioners. John Walker must be wrong. He described himself as an 'episcopal presbyterian,’ and waged a fierce war against independents and other sectaries, defended the parochial system, and boasted that 'he had withstood popery both by writing and preaching as much as any minister in Wales.' In 1652 he accepted the challenge which the famous itinerant, Vavasor Powell, threw down to any minister in Wales, to dispute whether his calling or Powell's, and his ways or his opponent's 'ways of separation' were most conformable to scripture. After some preliminary skirmishing, in which Griffith held up to ridicule the bad Latin of his adversary, the disputation was held on 23 July 1652, and, if Wood's partial testimony can be accepted, Powell 'fell from want of academic learning and of the true way of arguing.' Both parties claimed the victory and rushed into print.

Powell wrote his account in the 'Perfect Diurnall,’ while three pamphlets were Griffith's contributions to the controversy. They were: 1. 'A Bold Challenge of an Itinerant Preacher (Vavasor Powell) modestly answered by a Local Minister to whom the same was sent and delivered; and severall Letters thereupon' [in Latin], London, 1652, 4to. 2. 'A Relation of a Disputation between Dr. Griffith and Mr. V. Powell, and since some false observations made thereon,’ London, 1653, 4to. 3. 'A Welsh Narrative corrected and taught to speak true English and some Latine, or, Animadversions on an imperfect relation in the "Perfect Diurnall," Numb. 138, 2 Aug. 1652, containing a narration of the Disputation between Dr. Griffith and Mr. Vavasor Powell, near New Chappell in Mountgomeryshire, 23 July 1652,’ London, 1653. The 'British Museum Catalogue' also assumes that Griffith was the George Griffith who wrote prefaces to devotional works of William Strong, preacher at the Charterhouse, but it is more likely that this was George Griffith of the Charterhouse, ejected for nonconformity in 1662.

After the Restoration the patronage of Sheldon secured for Griffith the bishopric of St Asaph. He was elected to the See on 17 October 1660, confirmed 24 October, and consecrated a bishop on 28 October 1660, along with four other bishops, in Henry VII's Chapel at Westminster, Brian Duppa acting as consecrator and J. Sudbury, afterwards dean of Durham, preaching the sermon, which was published. It was the first consecration of bishops after the Restoration. He was allowed to retain his old preferments in commendam, as well as the archdeaconry and the sinecure rectory of Llanrhaiadr yn Mochnant, as the revenues of his see were 'insufficient to maintain the state of a prelate' (Cal. State Papers, Dom. 1660–1, p. 322).

Though not a commissioner, Griffith took some part in the Savoy conference, 'speaking but once or twice a few words calmly' (Kennett, p. 508). Lloyd (Memoirs, p. 100, fol. ed.) says that he 'not only concurred effectually in drawing up the Act of Uniformity, but the form of baptism for those of riper years was of his composing.' He was one of the three bishops charged with that task (Kennett, p. 449).

The main work of Griffith's bishopric was to restore order and uniformity and look after the fabrics of the churches. In 1662 he published 'Articles of Enquiry concerning matters Ecclesiastical exhibited in his primary Episcopal Visitation.' He died on 28 Nov. 1666, and was buried in the choir of his cathedral. The short inscription ends quaintly, 'qui plura desiderat, facile investiget.' A half-length portrait of him in his episcopal habit is in Christ Church Hall.

Besides the pamphlets against Powell, Griffith wrote some 'Plain Discourses on the Lord's Supper,’ published at Oxford in 1684. In 1685 there was also printed at Oxford 'Gweddi'r-Arglwydd wedi ei hegluro, mewn amrŷw ymadroddion, neu bregethau byrbion, o waith G. Griffith diweddar escob Llanelwy.' This was reprinted in 1806 at Carnarvon. He is said to have undertaken the translation of the revised prayer-book into Welsh, and may have written the pamphlet, also attributed to Charles Edwards, author of 'Hanes y Ffydd,’ 'On some Omissions and Mistakes in the British translation of the Bible,’ 1666. Some writings by him are preserved in manuscript in the collection of Miss Conway Griffiths, his descendant (Hist. MSS. Comm. 5th Rep. p. 406).

Griffith left six children, one son and five daughters. One of these was married to John Middleton of Gwaenynog, in which house a portrait of the bishop is said still to remain.

Church of England titles
Preceded by vacant John Owen, 1651	Bishop of St Asaph; 1660–1666	Succeeded by Henry Glemham
