= Thomas Bird =

Thomas Bird may refer to:

- Thomas Bird (sportsman) (1904–1979), Australian sportsman; cricketer for Victoria and Australian rules footballer with Collingwood
- Thomas Bird (fur trader) (died 1739), trader and factor for the Hudson's Bay Company
- Thomas Bird (murderer) (1749–1790), British convicted murder and sailor, first person to be executed by the U.S. federal government
- Thomas William Bird (1883–1958), Canadian clergyman and politician
- Thomas Bird (bishop), 15th-century bishop of St Asaph
- Thomas A. Bird (1918–2017), British soldier and architect

== See also ==
- Thomas Bird Mosher (1852–1923), American publisher
