= Norman Cocker =

British organist and composer

Norman Cocker (30 November 1889 — 15 November 1953) was a British organist, choir master and composer of church music, educational and light music.

Cocker was born in Sowerby Bridge, Yorkshire, England, and became a chorister at Magdalen College, Oxford. He was awarded the Organ Scholarship at Merton College, Oxford, but never completed his degree after being sent down, on his own admission, for not doing enough work. While at Oxford he conducted an ensemble called the Oxford University Light Music Orchestra, taking his amateur players through Archibald Joyce waltzes and selections from The Merry Widow. Norman Cocker held the diploma of ARCO, obtained by examination in July 1911, winning the Lafontaine Prize for the highest marks that session in the playing tests.

In the First World War Cocker served with the 16th Lancashire Fusiliers. He also learned to play every instrument of the orchestra during the war years.

He was appointed Assistant Organist at Manchester Cathedral in 1920 under Archibald W. Wilson, becoming Organist and choral master there in 1943, and later held appointments in various churches and cinemas in the city, including Organist at the Gaumont Cinema in Oxford Street (demolished in 1990).

Norman Cocker is today remembered mainly for his organ compositions, particularly Tuba Tune (1922), still often performed today and recorded many times. There is also a modern edition of four short organ pieces: Angelus, Trio, Interlude and Paean which have been recorded by Simon Lindley. Other works include choral anthems and hymns, and also several symphonies especially written for school orchestras, including the orchestra at Chetham's School. Keith Swallow and John Wilson have recorded his Eight Piano Duets, Op. 5 (1913-15).

Cocker was also an amateur magician and a good cook.

Cultural offices
| Preceded by Archibald Wilson | Organist and Master of the Choristers of Manchester Cathedral; 1943–1953 | Succeeded by Allan Wicks |

Cultural offices
| Preceded by Archibald Wilson | Organist and Master of the Choristers of Manchester Cathedral; 1943–1953 | Succeeded by Allan Wicks |
