= Henry Standish =

English Franciscan; Bishop of St Asaph

Henry Standish (c. 1475–1535) was an English Franciscan, who became Bishop of St. Asaph. He is known as an opponent of Erasmus in particular, and humanists in general.

He was a Doctor of Divinity of the University of Oxford. He was Guardian of the Franciscan Friary in London, and in 1505 Franciscan minister provincial for England. He preached for Henry VIII.

In 1515 Richard Kidderminster, Abbot of Winchcombe, attacked a 1512 Act of Parliament restricting the benefit of clergy, to those in major orders. The House of Lords refused to pass the bill from the Commons that would renew the law, which was close to expiration. Standish defended it, and won the decision, at a meeting called at Blackfriars of a royal committee called to look into the issue. Anti-clerical feelings were running high at the time, in the case of Richard Hunne, with its coroner's jury verdict of murder in a bishop's prison from February 1515. Convocation then proceeded with charges of heresy against Standish. In the end the King’s influence was brought to bear: the charges against Standish were not pressed, but the Act was not renewed in the Lords. Thomas Wolsey asked to have the case sent for papal judgement, but was overruled.

Standish was consecrated a bishop on 6 July 1518, by William Warham, Archbishop of Canterbury, assisted by Robert Sherborne, Bishop of Chichester, and John Young, suffragan bishop of London. His criticisms of the Greek New Testament of Erasmus was part of a wider controversy around 1520, that drew in Edward Lee, Archbishop of York. Erasmus hit back satirically. Standish is described as essentially a combatant and an inheritor of the tradition of the friars of Wyclif's day, at once opposed to doctrinal innovations and clerical privilege, and a conservative of the type of Stokesley and Tunstall. He was classed also with Richard Fitzjames and Edmund Birkhead, as an opponent to the English humanism of John Colet.

He was one of the court who convicted Thomas Bilney of heresy. In 1528 he acted as one of the counsel for Catherine of Aragon in her divorce case. He was one of the group of clerics targeted in 1530 by Henry VIII with praemunire charges.

He held the Lancashire parish of Standish, right at the end of his life.
