= David Flood (organist) =

British choir director and organist

David Flood was the organist and master of the cathedral choristers at Canterbury Cathedral, a position he held for 32 years from 1988 to 2020. He is a Fellow of the Royal College of Organists.

In 1978, he was appointed assistant organist at Canterbury Cathedral. He spent two years at Lincoln Cathedral from 1986, returning to Canterbury as master of choristers from 1988.

He is a visiting professor at Canterbury Christ Church University and a visiting fellow of St John's College, Durham.

Cultural offices
Preceded by Allan Wicks	Organist and Master of the Choristers of Canterbury Cathedral; 1988-2020	Succeeded by David Newsholme
