= Bishop of St Asaph =

Head of the Church in Wales diocese of St Asaph

- Bishopric

anglican
- Coat of arms
- Incumbent; Gregory Cameron

Location
- Ecclesiastical province: Wales

Information
- Diocese: St Asaph
- Cathedral: St Asaph Cathedral

The Bishop of St Asaph heads the Church in Wales diocese of St Asaph.

The diocese covers the counties of Conwy and Flintshire, Wrexham county borough, the eastern part of Merioneth in Gwynedd and part of northern Powys. The Episcopal seat is located in the Cathedral Church of St Asaph in the city of St Asaph in Denbighshire, north Wales.

The Bishop's residence is Esgobty, St Asaph. The current bishop is Gregory Cameron, who was elected on 5 January and consecrated on 4 April 2009. He became Bishop of St Asaph in succession to John Davies, who was consecrated in October 1999 and who retired in 2008.

== Early times ==
This diocese was supposedly founded by St Kentigern (Cyndeyrn) about the middle of the 6th century, although this is unlikely. The date often given is 583. Exiled from his see in Scotland, Kentigern is said to have founded a monastery called Llanelwy – which is the Welsh name for St Asaph – at the confluence of the rivers Clwyd and Elwy in north Wales, where after his return to Scotland he was succeeded by Asaph or Asa, who was consecrated Bishop of Llanelwy. The Diocese of Llanelwy originally largely coincided with the kingdom of Powys, together with the part of the kingdom of Gwynedd known as Gwynedd Is Conwy, but lost much territory first by the Mercian encroachment marked by Watt's dyke and again by the construction of Offa's Dyke, soon after 798. Nothing is known of the history of the diocese during the disturbed period that followed. Some historians doubt the existence of the diocese per se before the Norman period, and the bishop list and the fact that the Diocese of Bangor, in the kingdom of Gwynedd, held large tracts of land there tends to confirm this.

== Middle Ages ==
The Domesday Book of 1086 gives scanty particulars of a few churches but is silent as to the cathedral. Early in the twelfth century Norman influence asserted itself and in 1143 Theobald, Archbishop of Canterbury, consecrated one Gilbert as Bishop of St. Asaph, but the position of his successors was very difficult and one of them, Godfrey, was driven away by poverty and the hostility of the Welsh. A return made in the middle of the thirteenth century (London, British Library, Cotton Vitellius, c. x.) shows the existence of eight rural deaneries, seventy-nine churches, and nineteen chapels. By 1291 the deaneries had been doubled in number and there were Cistercian houses at Basingwerk, Aberconwy, Strata Marcella and Valle Crucis, and a Cistercian nunnery, Llanllugan Abbey. The cathedral, which had been burnt in the wars, was rebuilt and completed in 1295. Dedicated to St Asaph, it was a plain massive structure of simple plan, and was again destroyed during the Wars of the Roses. When it was restored by Bishop Redman the palace was not rebuilt and thus the bishops continued to be nonresident, notwithstanding the fact that in the late Middle Ages the bishop had five episcopal residences, four of which were alienated under King Edward VI. Redman was abbot of Shap Abbey and visitor for the Premonstratensian canons, and spent most of his time visiting their monasteries or his diocese; he was diligent in his duties and felt no need to be resident in the city. At the end of the fifteenth century there was a great revival of church building, as is evidenced by the churches of that date still existing in the diocese. The chief shrines in the diocese were St Winefred's Well, St Garmon in Yale, St Derfel Gadarn in Edeirnion, St Melangell at Pennant, and the Holy Cross in Strata Marcella. All these were demolished at the Reformation. At that time the diocese contained one archdeaconry, sixteen deaneries, and one hundred and twenty-one parishes.

The names and succession of the bishops after Saints Kentigern and Asaph are not clearly known until 1143. The last bishop in communion with Rome was Thomas Goldwell, who acceded in 1555 and was in the process of being transferred to Oxford when Queen Mary I died and Elizabeth I came to the throne. Goldwell fled to the Continent and died in Rome on 13 April 1585, the last surviving member of the pre-Reformation hierarchy.

The Report of the Commissioners appointed by his Majesty to inquire into the Ecclesiastical Revenues of England and Wales (1835) found the see had an annual net income of £6,301. This made it the wealthiest diocese in Wales and the fourth richest in Britain after Canterbury, London and Winchester.

The see continued to be part of the Church of England until the Church was disestablished in Wales in 1920, since when it has been part of the (Anglican) Church in Wales.

== List of the Bishops of St Asaph ==
=== Pre-reformation bishops ===
Bishops of St Asaph
From	Until	Incumbent	Notes
6th century AD		Kentigern (Saint Mungo)	Originally Bishop of Glasgow from c. 540; founded diocese as episcopus Elvensis, Elguensis, Elveiisis, Lanelwensis
6th century AD		Saint Asaph	
c. 600		Saint Tysilio	
c. 800		Renchidus	
c. 928		Cebur	
c. 1070		Melanus	
1143	c. 1151	Gilbert	See recreated as suffragan of Canterbury
c. 1152	1154	Geoffrey of Monmouth	
1154	1155	Richard	Died in office
c. 1160	1165	Godfrey	Left see to become abbot of Abingdon in 1165, removed from office in 1175
1175	1181	Adam the Welshman	Canon of Pershore
1183	c. 1186	John I	
1186	c. 1224	Reiner	
1225	c. 1233	Abraham	
1235	c. 1241	Hugh	Monk of the Friars
1242	1247	Hywel ab Ednyfed	Also known as Howel ap Ednevet
1247	1249	vacant	
1249	1266	Einion I	Also known as Anian
1267	1268	John II	
1268	1293	Einion II	Also known as Anian de Schonau, prior of Rhudland
1293	1314	Llywelyn de Bromfield	Also known as Leolinus de Bromfield
1315	c. 1352	Dafydd ap Bleddyn	Also known as David ap Blethin; canon of St. Asaph
1352	1357	John Trevor (I)	Also known as John Trevaur
1357	1375	Llywelyn ap Madog	Also known as Leolinus ap Madoc ap Elis; dean of St. Asaph
1376	1382	William Spridlington	Also known as William de Spridlington; dean of St. Asaph
1382	1389	Lawrence Child	Monk of Battle Abbey, licentiate of the civil law
1390	1394	Alexander Bache	Also known as Alexander Bach; canon of St. Asaph
1395	1402	John Trevor (II)	Prebendary of Hereford; deprived, possibly reinstated following David II as see not declared vacant prior to his death in 1410
1402	c. 1408	David II	
1411	c. 1433	Robert Lancaster	Also known as Robert of Lancaster
1433	1444	John Low	Also known as John Lobbe; a friar eremite; translated to Rochester
1444	1449	Reginald Pecock	Also known as Reginald Peacock; translated to Chichester
1450	1463	Thomas Bird	Also known as Thomas Knight; deprived for rebellion; temporalities of the diocese to the king, the bishop of Rochester, Robert Caunton, and John Stanley before the pardoning of Thomas in 1471
1471	1495	Richard Redman	Translated to Exeter
c. 1495	1500	Michael Deacon	Also known as Michael Dyacon; the king's confessor
1500	1503	Dafydd ab Ieuan ab Iorwerth	Also known as David ap Yeworth; abbot of Valle Crucis
c. 1503	c. 1513	Dafydd ab Owain	Also known as David ap Owen; abbot of Aberconwy
1513	1518	Edmund Birkhead	Also known as Edmund Brokehed
1518	1535	Henry Standish	

=== During the Reformation ===
Bishops of St Asaph
From	Until	Incumbent	Notes
c. 1535	1536	William Barlow	Prior of Haverfordwest. Translated to St David's, then Bath & Wells, then Chichester
1536	1554	Robert Parfew	Also known as Robert Warton; abbot of St. Savior's Bermondsey; translated to Hereford
1556	c. 1559	Thomas Goldwell CR	Went into voluntary exile (as Catholic)

=== Post-Reformation ===
==== Bishops of the Church of England ====
Bishops of St Asaph
From	Until	Incumbent	Notes
1560	1561	Richard Davies	Translated to St David's
1561	1573	Thomas Davies	
1573	1600	William Hughes	
1601	1604	William Morgan	Translator of the Bible into Welsh. Translated from Llandaff
1604	1623	Richard Parry	Dean of Bangor
1624	1629	John Hanmer	Prebendary of Worcester
1629	1646	John Owen	Archdeacon of St Asaph; deprived of the see when episcopacy was abolished by Parliament on 9 October 1646; died 1651
1646	1660	The see was abolished during the Commonwealth and the Protectorate.	
1660	1666	George Griffith	Archdeacon of St Asaph
1667	1670	Henry Glemham	Dean of Bristol
1670	1680	Isaac Barrow	Translated from Sodor & Man
1680	1692	William Lloyd	Dean of Bangor; translated to Lichfield & Coventry, then Worcester
1692	1703	Edward Jones	Translated from Cloyne, Ireland
1703	1704	George Hooper	Dean of Canterbury; translated to Bath & Wells
1704	1708	William Beveridge	Archdeacon of Colchester
1708	1714	William Fleetwood	Canon of Windsor; translated to Ely
1714	1727	John Wynne	Principal of Jesus College, Oxford; translated to Bath & Wells
1727	1731	Francis Hare	Dean of Worcester and of St Paul's in London; translated to Chichester
1732	1735	Thomas Tanner	Canon of Christ Church, Oxford
1736	1743	Isaac Maddox	Dean of Wells; translated to Worcester
1743	1744	John Thomas	Dean of Peterborough; elected in Nov. but translated to Lincoln in Jan. before consecration
1744	1748	Samuel Lisle	Archdeacon of Canterbury; translated to Norwich
1748	1761	Robert Hay Drummond	Prebendary of Westminster; translated to Salisbury
1761	1769	Richard Newcome	Translated from Llandaff
1769	1788	Jonathan Shipley	Translated from Llandaff
1789	1790	Samuel Hallifax	Also known as Samuel Halifax; translated from Gloucester
1790	1802	Lewis Bagot	Translated from Norwich
1802	1806	Samuel Horsley	Translated from Rochester
1806	1815	William Cleaver	Translated from Bangor
1815	1830	John Luxmoore	Translated from Hereford
1830	1846	William Carey	Translated from Exeter
1846	1870	Thomas Vowler Short	Translated from Sodor & Man
1870	1889	Joshua Hughes	Vicar of Llandovery
1889	1920	Alfred George Edwards	Church in Wales disestablished 1920

==== Bishops of the disestablished Church in Wales ====
Bishops of St Asaph
From	Until	Incumbent	Notes
1920	1934	Alfred George Edwards	First Archbishop of Wales 1920–1934
1934	1950	William Havard	
1950	1971	David Bartlett	
1971	1981	Harold Charles	
1981	1999	Alwyn Rice Jones	Archbishop of Wales 1991–1999
1999	2008	John Davies	
2009	incumbent	Gregory Cameron	Consecrated 4 April 2009

== Assistant bishops ==
Among those who have served as assistant bishops of the diocese have been:

- 1993–1996: Huw Jones, later Bishop of St Davids
