= Edmund Birkhead =

English bishop

Edmund Birkhead, D.D. was Bishop of St Asaph from 1513 until 1518.

Birkhead was born in Cheshire and educated at the University of Cambridge. He was buried at Wrexham.

Church of England titles
Preceded by Dafydd ab Owain	Bishop of St Asaph; 1513–1518	Succeeded by Henry Standish
