= Edward Lee (bishop) =

Archbishop of York from 1531 to 1544

The Most Reverend Edward Lee
- Archbishop of York
- Installed: 1531
- Term ended: 1544
- Predecessor: Thomas Wolsey
- Successor: Robert Holgate

Personal details
- Born: c. 1482
- Died: 13 September 1544

Edward Lee (c. 1482 – 13 September 1544) was Archbishop of York from 1531 until his death.

== Early life ==
He was son of Richard Lee of Lee Magna, Kent, who was the son of Sir Richard Lee, lord mayor of London in 1461 and 1470. He was born in Kent in or about 1482. Thomas More was a family friend, and dedicated an early work, Life of John Picus, to Lee's sister Joyce, a Poor Clare.

Lee was elected fellow of Magdalen College, Oxford, in 1500. Having graduated BA, he was incorporated at Cambridge early in 1503, moving from Oxford, it is supposed, on account of some outbreak of plague. At Cambridge he proceeded MA in 1504, being ordained deacon in that year, with title to the church of Wells, Norfolk. In 1512 he was collated to a prebend at Lincoln, and had his grace for degree of BD, but was not admitted until 1515, in which year he was chosen proctor in convocation. Thomas Cranmer took his MA in 1515, an early chance of contact with his future fellow-archbishop; Lee was later (1526) to give him his first court employment, as a junior member attached to a diplomatic mission to Spain.

== Controversies with Erasmus ==
He spent time in 1518 at the University of Louvain, studying Greek, where he encountered Erasmus, at that time reshaping the humanist views in particular on the New Testament. From an initially friendly disagreement, there evolved a series of polemics between Erasmus and Lee, with Lee emerging as the advocate of a traditionalist position.

Erasmus wrote to Lee explaining that he had not been able to make use of certain annotations which Lee had written. By 1519 Lee was a prominent opponent of Erasmus. Erasmus declared that Lee was a young man desirous of fame, and that he spread about reports to his disadvantage; he further said that Lee had circulated among religious houses an unfavourable criticism of his New Testament without having sent it to him, and he threatened Lee with punishment at the hands of German scholars. During 1520 the dispute was carried on with bitterness on both sides. Erasmus said that Lee's chief supporter was Henry Standish. Lee put forth sundry attacks on Erasmus, who retaliated by the Epistolæ aliquot Eruditorum Virorum, and sent an Apologia to Henry VIII defending himself against Lee. Thomas More, who said that he had loved Lee from boyhood, regretted the dispute, and set up a formal reconciliation at Calais in 1520, where diplomatic negotiations were taking place; but the meeting of Erasmus and Lee had little immediate effect, and the quarrel was not made up until 1522.

Lee provided substantive theological criticisms of In Praise of Folly, by close reading, in a fashion also later adopted by Noël Béda and Rodolfo Pio da Carpi. In dealing with the concept of ecstasy, Erasmus was accused by Lee of straying into territory explored by German mystical thinkers, and deemed heretical by the Church. Erasmus shrugged off the comparisons with the Beghards and Turlupins; but he found it less easy to place a distance between himself and Meister Eckhart or Johan Tauler. The heresy of Montanism was too close to some of what he had written, and he was thrown somewhat on the defensive, in later writings avoiding the term "spirit" in its Platonic associations.

== Relations with the king ==
In 1523 the king sent Lee with Henry Parker, 10th Baron Morley, and Sir William Hussey on an embassy to the Archduke Ferdinand of Austria to carry him the Garter, with the diplomatic aims of encouraging his opposition to the Lutherans and Francis I of France. Lee was the orator of the embassy. He was the king's almoner, and in the same year received the archdeaconry of Colchester. In 1525 he was sent with Sir Francis Poyntz to Spain on an embassy to the emperor. During 1529 he was engaged in an embassy to the Emperor Charles V in Spain, and in January 1530 was sent with the Earl of Wiltshire and John Stokesley to Pope Clement VII and the emperor at Bologna, to endeavour to persuade them of the king's divorce from Queen Catherine of Aragon.

He returned to England in the spring. In 1529 he was made chancellor of the church of Salisbury, and in 1530 received a prebend at York, and a prebend of the royal chapel, and was incorporated D.D. at Oxford. Lee made himself useful to the king at home in the matter of the divorce, and on 1 June 1531 was one of a deputation which was sent to the queen to persuade her to forgo her rights. He spoke freely to the queen, who told him that what he said was untrue. In September, Henry wrote to the pope requesting authority for Lee's elevation to the archbishopric of York. On 13 October, Lee and others had an interview with Catharine, in which they urged her to withdraw her cause from Rome and submit to the decision of bishops and doctors. Clement granted a bull for Lee's elevation on the 30th; he was consecrated to the see of York on 10 December, and was enthroned by proxy on the 17th.

Money difficulties made it advisable for him to please the king and Thomas Cromwell, which he did in the matter of patronage. In common with Stephen Gardiner, however, he refused in February 1533 to sign the declaration that the marriage with Catharine had been void from the beginning; but shortly afterwards got from the convocation of York an approbation of the grounds of the divorce. After the execution of Elizabeth Barton and her associates, in April 1534, it was falsely rumoured that Lee and other bishops were to be sent to the Tower of London.

In company with Stokesley, Lee visited John Houghton, the prior of the London Charterhouse, in the Tower, and represented to him that the succession was not a matter to die for, and he used a similar expression with reference to the cause in which Bishop John Fisher suffered. This was despite the fact that it was not the succession that these were to die over, but the inclusion in the preamble to the Act of Succession of the claim to be head of the English Church, by the king, which they denied was possible. On 21 May he and the Bishop of Durham were sent to Catharine at Kimbolton to expound to her the act of succession, and urge her to submission. He forwarded to the king on 1 June the declaration of the York convocation held the previous month, that the Pope had no greater jurisdiction within the realm of England than any other foreign bishop, and on 17 February 1535 wrote to the king professing his willingness to obey his will. Nevertheless, he was suspected of disliking the royal supremacy.

The king sent to him, as to other bishops, his commands that his new style should be published in his cathedral, and that the clergy should be instructed to set it forth in their parishes; and he also received Thomas Cranmer's order for preaching and form for bidding the beads, in which the king's style was inserted, with the king's order that every preacher should declare against papal supremacy, and defend the divorce and marriage with Anne Boleyn. Henry was informed that Lee had neglected these orders and wrote to him reminding him that he had subscribed to the supremacy.

Lee answered on 14 June that he had, according to order, preached solemnly in his cathedral on the injury done to the king by the pope and on the divorce, but he acknowledged that he had made no mention of the royal supremacy. He asked the king not to listen to the accusations of his enemies. Moreover, on 1 July he wrote to Cromwell, sending him two books which he had prepared, one for his clergy to read and extend to their congregations, the other a brief declaration to the people of the royal supremacy, adding that the livings in his diocese were so poor that no learned man would take them, that he did not know in it more than twelve secular priests who could preach.

New cause of suspicion arose against him, and a few months later, he was examined by the king's visitor, Richard Layton, concerning words he was alleged to have used to the general confessor of Syon Abbey, and concerning the supremacy. He wrote his defence to the king on 14 January 1536. On 23 April, he interceded with Cromwell for two religious houses in his province: Hexham Abbey, useful as a place of refuge during Scottish invasions, and Nostell Priory, which he claimed as a free chapel belonging to his see. In June, he argued against the condemnation of Catholic customs in convocation and was regarded as the head of the anti-Reformation party.

== The Pilgrimage of Grace and later life ==
When the northern insurrection called the Pilgrimage of Grace broke out, later in 1536, Lee's position was equivocal at first. He took refuge on 13 October with Thomas Darcy, 1st Baron Darcy de Darcy, who held Pontefract Castle. On the 20th it was surrendered to the rebels, and the archbishop was compelled to take the oath of the Pilgrimage of Grace. Initially perhaps in favour of the movement, his opinion may have changed; for when on 27 November he and the clergy met in the church to consider certain articles proposed to them, he preached on the other side. The clergy, however, would not be led by him, and he was dragged from the pulpit.

For some time out of the king's favour, Cromwell stood by his friend, and in July 1537 Lee wrote to him thanking him for giving Henry a good report of his sermons. In his diocesan duties he was assisted by a suffragan bishop. He served on the commission that drew up the Institution of a Christian Man. In May 1539 he argued in parliament in defence of the Six Articles, and in conjunction with others drew up the bill founded upon them. He was on the commission appointed in the spring of 1540 to examine the doctrines and ceremonies retained in the church, and on that which had to determine on the invalidity of the king's marriage with Anne of Cleves.

From about 1540 he was patron to the struggling Roger Ascham. His support was not very generous, and was accompanied by criticism, but tided Ascham over for a few years at the beginning of his career as humanist and writer.

In 1541 new statutes for the government of the church of York were issued under the great seal. Lee surrendered to the crown in 1542 the manors of Beverley and Southwell and other estates, receiving in exchange lands belonging to certain suppressed priories, an exchange not particularly disadvantageous to the see. He died on 13 September 1544, at the age of sixty-two, and was buried in his cathedral church. Lee was the last archbishop of York that coined money.

== Works ==
- 'Commentarium in universum Pentateuchum,’ not printed, comp. 'Aschami Epp.' ii. 89;
- 'Apologia contra quorundam Calumnias;’
- 'Index annotationum prioris libri;’
- 'Epistola nuncupatoria ad D. Erasmum;’
- 'Annotationum libri duo;’
- 'Epistola apologetica, qua respondit D. Erasmi Epistolis' (these six, printed at Paris in or about 1520, are concerned with the controversy with Erasmus);
- 'Exhibita quædam per E. Leum, oratorem Anglicum in concilio Cæsareo,’ &c. 1528;
- Register of Edward Lee contains copies of the official statements relating to Henry VIII’s divorce from his fourth wife, Anne of Cleeves.

Verses to his honour were in 1566 placed by Laurence Humphrey, President of Magdalen College, Oxford, in the window of the founder's chamber in that college.
