= James Stanley (bishop) =

16th-century Bishop of Ely

James Stanley (c. 1465–1515), scion of a distinguished aristocratic family, was Bishop of Ely from 1506 to 1515. He was the third son of Thomas Stanley, 1st Earl of Derby. Described as the tallest man in England and reputed to be some 6 feet 7 inches tall, he took holy orders after university study, but, although regarded as a popular man, was not considered either a natural scholar or celibate. (There is an apocryphal story of Erasmus turning him down as a pupil.) Like most senior churchmen of his period, he was a pluralist and is believed to have lived with a woman, fathering at least one illegitimate child. Besides being renowned as a skilled soldier and an enthusiastic huntsman, he is also credited with a great interest in cockfighting. He was cited in Protestant propaganda of later centuries as an example of the corruption of the Medieval Church, although his decision to take orders can hardly have been voluntary, but rather a further means of consolidating the dynastic ambitions of his already powerful family. His appointment as bishop was made by papal bull of Pope Julius II.

He held the office Master or St James and St John Hospital at Brackley from 1472 and of Archdeacon of Richmond from 1500 to 1506.

He was buried in a tomb in what is now Manchester Cathedral, then a collegiate church, patronised by several generations of the Stanley family, and which he had enriched as Warden. The tomb, together with the Ely Chapel that housed it, was destroyed during the Blitz although the original, contemporary brass memorial has survived. There is also a memorial for the safe return of his alleged son (and certainly kinsman) Sir John Stanley from the Battle of Flodden in 1513; the St John the Baptist chapel, which incorporates the original site of the Ely Chapel, was built by James and John. The Stanley coat of arms can still be seen decorating the roof of this chapel, which is now dedicated to the memory of the Manchester Regiment.

He died on 22 March 1515 and was later remembered thus:

A goodlie tall man as was in all England

And sped well all matters that he took in hand
King Harrye the VIIth a prynce noble and sage
Made him Bishop for wisdom and Parentage
Of Ely. Many a day was he bishopp there
He builded Sommersome the byshoppe's chief manner
A great vyander as any in his days
For Byshoppes that then was, this is no dispraise.
Because he was a priest I dare do no lesse
But telle, as I know not, of his hardiness
What proud priest hath a blowe on the ear sodenlye
Turneth the other ear likewise for humilitye
He could not so do by the crosse in my purse
Yet I trust his soule fareth never the worse.
He did end his life in merry Manchester
And right honorablye lieth he buried there
In his chapel, which he began of freestone
Sir John Stanley built it out when he was gone
God send his soule to the heavenlye companye

Farewell godlye James Byshopp of Elye.

From the Ancient Metrical History of the House of Stanley.

== Notes ==
Catholic Church titles
Preceded by Richard Redman	Bishop of Ely; 1506–1515	Succeeded by Nicholas West
