= Allan Wicks =

English cathedral organist

Edward Allan Wicks CBE

Background information
- Born: 6 June 1923; Harden, West Riding of Yorkshire, England
- Died: 4 February 2010
- Genre: Classical
- Occupations: Organist, Choirmaster
- Instrument: Organ
- Years active: 1941–1988

Edward Allan Wicks CBE (6 June 1923, Harden, West Riding of Yorkshire − 4 February 2010) was an English cathedral organist, who served in Canterbury Cathedral for nearly 30 years. He was an early champion of the music of Olivier Messiaen, Peter Maxwell Davies and Kenneth Leighton. He also directed the specially-commissioned music for the 1951 revival of the York Mystery Plays, regarded as the greatest event in the Festival of Britain celebrations.

== Career ==
The son of a parson, Wicks began his musical studies as a pianist at an early age, but did not think that he would be good enough to become professional. He was educated at St John's School, Leatherhead, and at the age of 14 he was advised to convert to the organ. He took his degree at Christ Church, Oxford, where he was also organ scholar at the cathedral, assistant to Thomas Armstrong. Completing his studies after serving in the 14th Punjab Regiment, gaining an MA and an FRCO, he then took up post at York Minster in 1947, as sub-organist to Francis Jackson. He described his time at York as being much easier than modern cathedral organists: "In those days it was easier to manage on one's own, because we never used to conduct, except a cappella pieces, we never conducted like cathedral organists now who hardly ever play the organ, they're down there wagging a finger, waving their arms about." Whilst based in York, he was on the music staff at St Peter's School and Chorus Master of Leeds Philharmonic Society. For the 1951 revival of the York Mystery Plays he was director of the music, composed by his friend James Brown. The plays captured the hearts of the British public, and have been performed regularly ever since.

In 1954, Wicks left York to take the job of organist and choirmaster of Manchester Cathedral. There he inspired Maxwell Davies by his directing the choir in performances of John IV of Portugal and John Dunstaple. Wicks also championed Maxwell Davies's Fantasia on O Magnum Mysterium, as well as Malcolm Williamson's six-movement Symphony. He also organised a Cantata Choir and a small orchestra for Tuesday evening concerts of larger-scale works, including Igor Stravinsky's Canticum Sacrum and Messiaen's Messe de la Pentecôte.

In 1961 he was appointed organist and master of the choristers of Canterbury Cathedral, where he served for 27 years, under three Archbishops, retiring after being appointed C.B.E. in 1988. Whilst at Canterbury, he also was honoured with the Lambeth MusDoc in 1974 and an honorary DMus from the University of Kent in 1985.

Wicks died in 2010, and was survived by his wife, Elizabeth, and their two daughters.

=== Organist posts ===
- 1941–1946: Organ Scholar, Christ Church Cathedral, Oxford (interrupted by wartime service in the 14th Punjab Regiment)
- 1947–1954: Sub Organist, York Minster
- 1954–1961: Organist at Manchester Cathedral.
- 1961–1988: Organist at Canterbury Cathedral.

Cultural offices
Preceded by Norman Cocker	Organist and Master of the Choristers of Manchester Cathedral; 1954–1961	Succeeded by Derrick Cantrell
Preceded by Sidney Campbell	Organist and Master of the Choristers of Canterbury Cathedral; 1961–1988	Succeeded by David Flood
