= Turlupins =

Medieval Christian sect in France

The turlupins were a religious sect in medieval France, loosely related to the Beguines and Beghards and the Brethren of the Free Spirit. The name turlupin is a derisive epithet; they appear to have called themselves the "society of the poor" or "fellowship of poverty". Mention of them survives only in writings of their opponents, who condemned them as heretics. From Avignon, Pope Gregory XI (r. 1370–1378) excommunicated them as heretics. Therefore, very little is known about them, but they apparently wore few clothes as an expression of the vow of poverty, which led to accusations of nudism and promiscuity. Some historians think their importance may have been exaggerated to add "local colour" to academic theological disputes.

The sect was active mainly in the second half of the 14th century around Paris, being one of the few heretical sects active in Paris at that time. In 1372 a number were imprisoned, with a female leader, Jeanne Daubenton, burnt at the stake for witchcraft and heresy. A similar sect may have been active in the 1460s around Lille.
