= Dafydd ap Bleddyn =

Welsh bishop

Dafydd ap Bleddyn (died 1346) was the Welsh Catholic Bishop of St. Asaph in Wales from 1315 to 1346, succeeding Llywelyn ap Llywelyn.

Ap Bleddyn is thought to be a descendant of the 'tribe of Uchtryd'. His time as bishop is thought to have been relatively uneventful, and records suggest that he remained mainly within the diocese. He is known to have attended the consecration of Roger of Lichfield at Halesowen in West Midlands in June 1322.

Ap Bleddyn died in 1346, when he was succeeded by John Trevor.
