= Glasgoed, Ceredigion =

Village in Ceredigion, Wales

Coordinates: 52.114667°N 4.438056°W

Glasgoed
- Location within Ceredigion
- OS grid reference: SN 3316 4906
  - Cardiff: 69.5 mi (111.8 km)
  - London: 188.8 mi (303.8 km)
- Community: Penbryn
- Principal area: Ceredigion
- Country: Wales
- Sovereign state: United Kingdom
- Post town: Llandysul
- Postcode district: SA44
- Police: Dyfed-Powys
- Fire: Mid and West Wales
- Ambulance: Welsh
- UK Parliament: Ceredigion Preseli
- Senedd Cymru – Welsh Parliament: Ceredigion Penfro

Glasgoed is a small village in the community of Penbryn, Ceredigion, Wales, which is 69.5 miles (111.8 km) from Cardiff and 188.8 miles (303.8 km) from London. Glasgoed is represented in the Senedd by Elin Jones (Plaid Cymru) and is part of the Ceredigion Preseli constituency in the House of Commons.

== See also ==
- List of localities in Wales by population
