= Michael Deacon (bishop) =

Welsh bishop

Michael Deacon (sometimes Dyacon or Diacon) was Bishop of St Asaph from 1495 until his death in 1500.

Deacon, the King's Confessor was buried in St Paul's Chapel at Westminster Abbey.
