= Dafydd ab Ieuan ab Iorwerth =

Welsh bishop

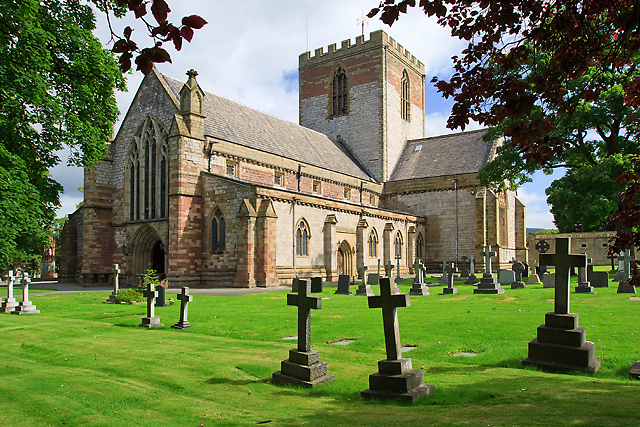
St Asaph Cathedral

Dafydd ab Ieuan ab Iorwerth (Welsh pronunciation: [ˈdavɨð ab ˈjɛɨan ab ˈjɔrwɛrθ], died no later than 1503) was Bishop of St Asaph from 1500 to 1503.

His family were the descendants of Tudur ap Rhys Sais.

Prior to his appointment he was Abbot of Valle Crucis. He provided hospitality to, and was liberal patron of the bards, as acknowledged by Gutun Owain and Guto'r Glyn.
