= Pulpitum =

Medieval architectural feature

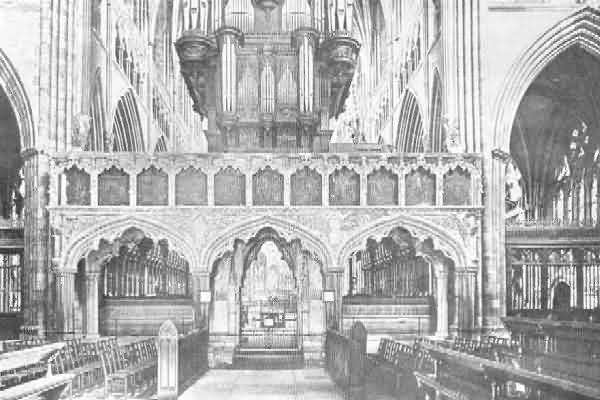
The pulpitum in Exeter Cathedral, photographed in the early 20th century. The arches of the pulpitum were opened up in a 19th-century reconstruction; originally they were solid.

The pulpitum is a common feature in medieval cathedral and monastic church architecture in Europe. It is a massive screen that divides the choir (the area containing the choir stalls and high altar in a cathedral, collegiate or monastic church) from the nave and ambulatory (the parts of the church to which lay worshippers may have access). It is usually constructed of stone, but there are also wooden examples as at Hexham Abbey and at Edington Priory. In France it is called a jubé. Typically it is lavishly carved and decorated. Those at York Minster and Canterbury Cathedral preserve complete medieval sets of statues of the kings of England.

The word pulpitum is applied in ecclesiastical Latin both to this form of screen and also for a pulpit; the secular origin of the term being a theatrical stage, or speaker's dais. It is thought that this form of screen originated in monastic practice, providing a raised stage from which members of religious communities could address pilgrims attending to venerate the church's relics, while still maintaining their monastic seclusion from lay contact.

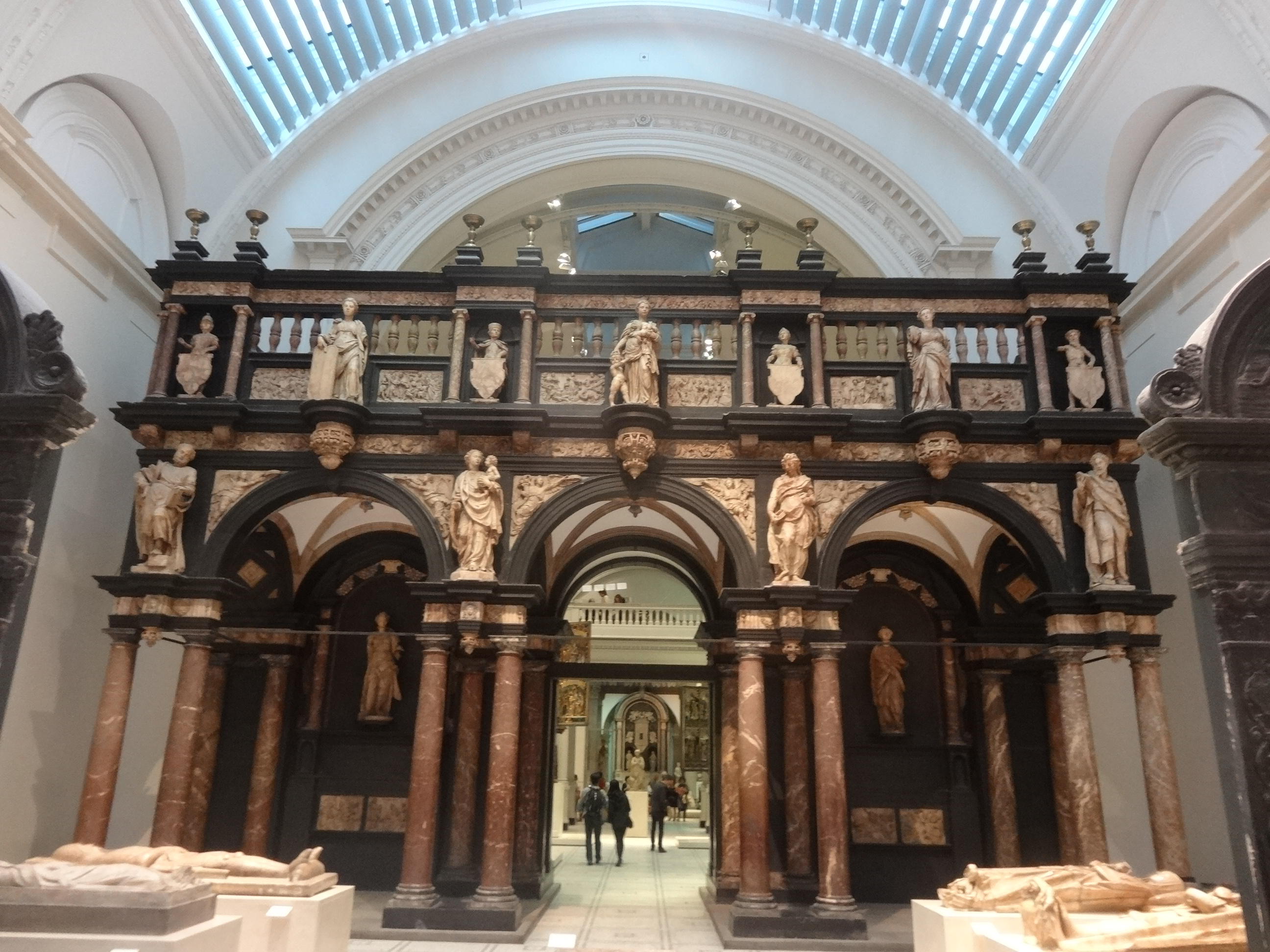
The pulpitum from St. John's Cathedral ('s-Hertogenbosch) now in the Victoria and Albert Museum.

An internal stair within the thickness of the pulpitum gives access to a broad upper platform, which commonly supports the cathedral organ. The pulpitum is pierced by a central passage, leading immediately into the choir stalls to the (ritual) east. Many pulpita, as those of Glasgow Cathedral, Exeter Cathedral and Southwell Minster, incorporated subsidiary altars either side of their central passages.

In the late medieval period, there was also a rood screen or rood beam placed one bay to the west of the pulpitum (i.e. further away from the high altar of the cathedral), and the main nave altar for the use of lay worshippers was set against its western face. This screen was pierced by lateral doors, left and right, for processional access to the nave, and for the use of pilgrims who would pass into the eastern arm of the church via the ambulatory to the feretory or shrine, commonly located behind the high altar. Most of these rood screens were demolished at the English Reformation, although the cathedrals of Peterborough and Canterbury retained their separate rood screens into the 18th century; and in the collegiate church of Ottery Saint Mary, both sets of screens remained until the early 19th century. At the former monastic churches of Saint Albans and Ewenny the rood screens survive, while the pulpita do not.

Many pulpita were moved or destroyed in the eighteenth century and the early 19th century, intending to open the view from the congregation to the sanctuary. The jubé of the church of Saint Gery in Cambrai was moved to the reverse of the western facade in 1740 and that of Saint Ursmer in Binche to the same position in 1778. The pulpitum at Amiens Cathedral was removed in 1755. James Essex removed the pulpitum in Ely Cathedral in 1770. The sculptures of the jubé of the Cathedral of St. Michael and St. Gudula in Brussels were removed in 1793 and the whole jubé destroyed in 1804. The Arundel Screen at Chichester Cathedral was removed in 1861; it was later re-erected in the Bell Tower before being returned to its original location, but with opened arches, in 1961. The pulpitum from St. John's Cathedral ('s-Hertogenbosch) was removed in the 1860s and purchased by the Victoria and Albert Museum. The pulpitum of Hexham Abbey has been moved to the north side of the choir.

In some instances a much less massive chancel screen was erected where the pulpitum had originally stood.

== See also ==
- Architecture of the medieval cathedrals of England
- Rood screen
