= Thomas Bird (bishop) =

English-Welsh bishop

Thomas Bird, OP, formerly prior of Daventry, was Bishop of St Asaph from 1450 until his deprivation in 1463.
