= John Owen (bishop of St Asaph) =

English bishop of St Asaph

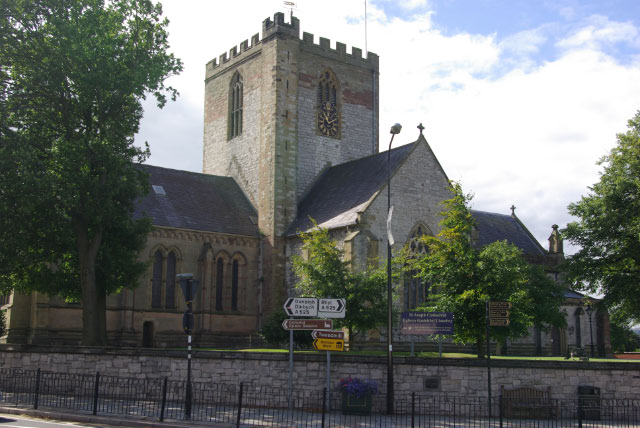
St Asaph Cathedral

John Owen (1580–1651) was an English bishop of St Asaph.

== Life ==
He was the eldest son of Owen Owens (died 1593) or John Owen, a Welsh-born Archdeacon of Anglesey, and Jane, his second wife. The son John was baptised at Burton-Latimer on 8 November 1580, and graduated B.A. from Christ's College, Cambridge, in 1597. He subsequently became Fellow of Jesus College, Cambridge, and proceeded M.A. in 1600 and D.D. in 1618. He was incorporated M.A. at Oxford on 16 July 1600. He remained at Cambridge for some years, and appears as taxor there in 1608. In 1608 he succeeded to the rectory of Burton-Latimer and was appointed chaplain to Prince Charles. In 1625 he received the rectories of Carlton, Northamptonshire, and of Cottingham in the same county.

Owen was in favour with William Laud, and was liked by Charles I; on 18 August 1629, he was elected bishop of St Asaph. He was consecrated at Croydon on 20 September, instituted on 23 September, and had his temporalities restored on 26 September 1629. In the same month, on 15 September, he received a grant to hold in commendam the archdeaconry of St Asaph and other benefices within his diocese, and the archdeaconry of Bangor to a value not exceeding £150 per annum. In his diocese, he boasted, he was connected by descent with every family of quality. He was active in the pastoral work of his bishopric and was the first to institute a series of Welsh sermons to be preached in the parish church the first Sunday of each month by members of the parish who derived a portion of their income from its tithes. He superintended improvements in the structure of the cathedral, including the building of a new organ in 1635. Owen held six rectories with his bishopric, mostly in commendam.

In the First English Civil War he suffered for his loyalty to the king. Having joined in the petition of the eleven bishops on 30 December 1641, he was impeached of high treason and imprisoned in the Tower of London. On 6 April following, when his bishopric was sequestrated, he was allowed by parliament £500 per annum. The sequestration of his rectories, the sale of his episcopal property and desecration of his palace followed. He was deprived of his See by Parliament on 9 October 1646, as episcopacy was abolished for the duration of the Commonwealth and the Protectorate. Owen died on 15 October 1651, at Perth Kinsey, and was buried in the cathedral church of St Asaph, under the bishops' throne (21 October).

== Family ==
Owen married, first: Sarah Hodelow of Cambridgeshire, by whom he had a son, Robert Owen, fellow of All Souls College, Oxford, B.C.L. on 3 December 1660, and shortly after chancellor of the diocese of St Asaph; and a daughter, married to Dr William Griffith, chancellor of Bangor and St Asaph. The first wife was buried at Burton-Latimer in February 1621. Owen's second wife was Elizabeth Gray; and his third wife, Elin, daughter of Robert Wyn of Conway.

== Notes ==
Attribution

This article incorporates text from a publication now in the public domain: "Owen, John (1580-1651)". Dictionary of National Biography. London: Smith, Elder & Co. 1885–1900.
