= List of alumni of Jesus College, Oxford =

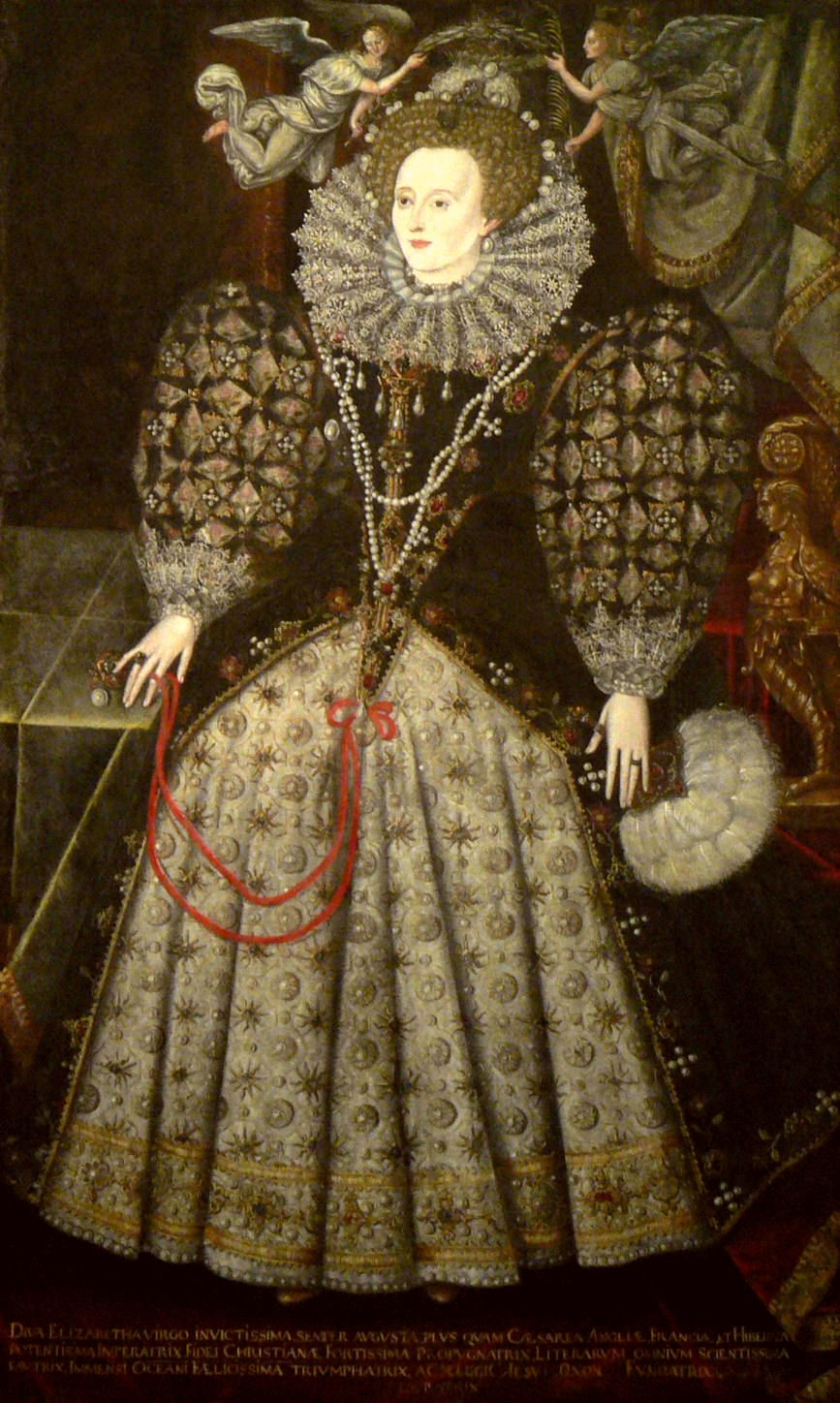
Portrait of Elizabeth I by Nicholas Hilliard in the college hall

Jesus College is one of the constituent colleges of the University of Oxford in England. Its alumni include politicians, lawyers, bishops, poets, and academics. Some went on to become fellows of the college; 14 students later became principal of the college. It was founded in 1571 by Queen Elizabeth I, at the request of a Welsh clergyman, Hugh Price, who was Treasurer of St David's Cathedral in Pembrokeshire. The college still has strong links with Wales, and about 15% of students are Welsh. There are 340 undergraduates and 190 students carrying out postgraduate studies. Old members of Jesus College are sometimes known as "Jesubites".

From the world of politics, the college's alumni include two Prime Ministers (Harold Wilson of Britain and Kevin Rudd of Australia), Jamaica's Chief Minister and first Premier (Norman Washington Manley), a Speaker of the House of Commons (Sir William Williams), a leader of the Liberal Democrats (Sir Ed Davey), a co-founder of Plaid Cymru (D. J. Williams) and a co-founder of the African National Congress (Pixley ka Isaka Seme). Members of Parliament from the three main political parties in the United Kingdom have attended the college, as have politicians from Australia (Neal Blewett), New Zealand (Harold Rushworth), Sri Lanka (Lalith Athulathmudali) and the United States (Heather Wilson). The list of lawyers include one Lord Chancellor (Lord Sankey) and one Law Lord (Lord du Parcq). The list of clergy includes three Archbishops of Wales (A. G. Edwards, Glyn Simon and Gwilym Williams). Celticists associated with the college include Sir John Morris-Jones, Sir Thomas (T. H.) Parry-Williams and William John Gruffydd, whilst the list of historians includes the college's first graduate, David Powel, who published the first printed history of Wales in 1584, and the Victorian historian John Richard Green. The list includes a recipient of the Victoria Cross (Angus Buchanan) and T. E. Lawrence, better known as "Lawrence of Arabia." Yuval Noah Harari, the author of the popular science bestsellers Sapiens: A Brief History of Humankind (2014), Homo Deus: A Brief History of Tomorrow (2016), and 21 Lessons for the 21st Century (2018) was a student at the college. Record-breaking quadriplegic solo sailor Hilary Lister was also a student there, whilst from the field of arts and entertainment there are names such as Magnus Magnusson, presenter of Mastermind, the National Poet of Wales Gwyn Thomas and television weather presenters Kirsty McCabe and Siân Lloyd.

Because women were barred from studying at Jesus College for over four centuries (from its foundation until 1974), this list of alumni consists almost entirely of men.

== Alumni ==
The sub-headings are given as a general guide and some names might fit under more than one category.

Abbreviations used in the following tables

- M – Year of matriculation at Jesus College (a dash indicates that the individual did not matriculate at the college)
- G – Year of graduation / conclusion of study at Jesus College (a dash indicates that the individual graduated from another college)
- DNG – Did not graduate: left the college without taking a degree
- ? – Year unknown; an approximate year is used for table-sorting purposes.
- (F/P) after name – later became a fellow or principal of Jesus College, and included on the list of principals and fellows
- (HF) after name – later became an Honorary Fellow of Jesus College, and included on the list of Honorary Fellows

Degree abbreviations

- Undergraduate degree: BA – Bachelor of Arts
- Postgraduate degrees:

- BCL – Bachelor of Civil Law
- BD – Bachelor of Divinity
- BLitt – Bachelor of Letters
- BMus – Bachelor of Music
- BSc – Bachelor of Science
- BTh – Bachelor of Theology
- MA – Master of Arts
- MB – Bachelor of Medicine
- MD – Doctor of Medicine

- MLitt – Master of Letters
- MSc – Master of Science
- MPhil – Master of Philosophy
- DCL – Doctor of Civil Law
- DD – Doctor of Divinity
- DLitt – Doctor of Letters
- DMus – Doctor of Music
- DPhil – Doctor of Philosophy
- DTh – Doctor of Theology

The subject studied and the degree classification are included, where known. Until the early 19th century, undergraduates read for a Bachelor of Arts degree that included study of Latin and Greek texts, mathematics, geometry, philosophy and theology. Individual subjects at undergraduate level were only introduced later: for example, Mathematics (1805), Natural Science (1850), Jurisprudence (1851, although it had been available before this to students who obtained special permission), Modern History (1851) and Theology (1871). Geography and Modern Languages were introduced in the 20th century. Music had been available as a specialist subject before these changes; medicine was studied as a post-graduate subject.

=== Politicians and civil servants ===
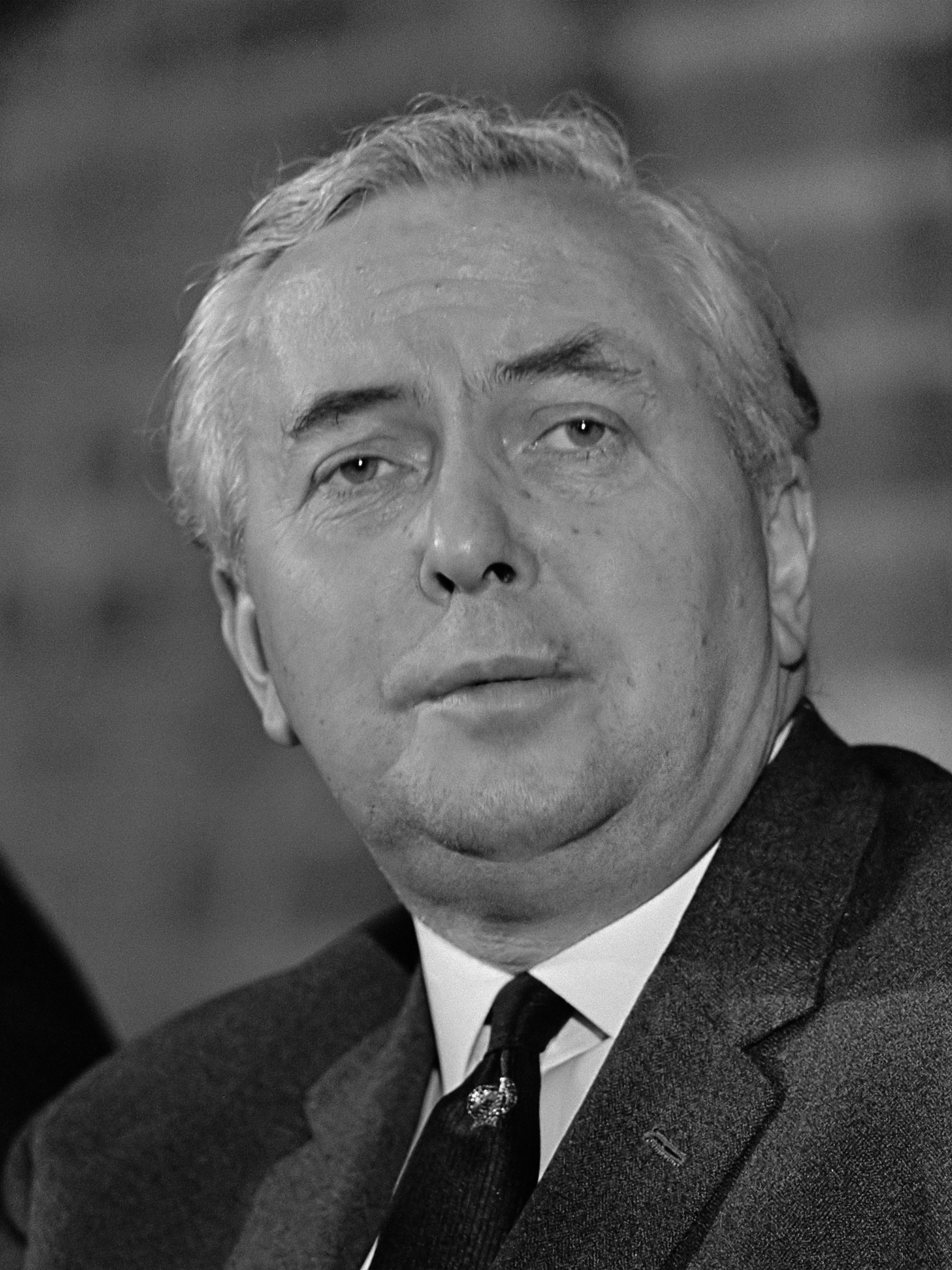
Harold Wilson, British Prime Minister

Harold Wilson studied at Jesus College from 1934 to 1937, and was later the Prime Minister of the United Kingdom during two periods (from October 1964 to June 1970, and from March 1974 to April 1976). More than 30 other Members of Parliament have been educated at the college, from Sir John Salusbury who was elected as MP for Denbighshire in 1601 to Theresa Villiers who was elected as MP for Chipping Barnet in 2005. Sir Leoline Jenkins, who became a fellow and later the principal of the college, was Secretary of State for the Northern Department from 1680 to 1681 and Secretary of State for the Southern Department from 1681 to 1685. Sir William Williams served as Speaker of the House of Commons from 1680 to 1685 and as Solicitor General for England and Wales from 1687 to 1689. Evan Cotton was MP for Finsbury East before holding the position of President of the Bengal Legislative Council from 1922 to 1925. Several Welsh politicians have been educated at the college, such as Delyth Jewell, Welsh Deputy Minister, some representing constituencies in Wales (such as Sir John Wogan, representing Pembrokeshire at various times between 1614 and 1644) and others working outside Parliament, such as D. J. Williams (a co-founder of the Welsh nationalist party Plaid Cymru). Leader of the Liberal Democrats 2020–present, Sir Ed Davey, was also educated at the college.

Other students at the college have held political offices in other countries. Norman Manley was Chief Minister of Jamaica from 1955 to 1959, and served as its first and only Premier from 1959 to 1962 whilst negotiating its independence. In 2017, former Australian Prime Minister Kevin Rudd began studying for a doctorate on General Secretary of the Chinese Communist Party Xi Jinping at the college. P. T. Rajan was Chief Minister of Madras Presidency between April and August 1936. Heather Wilson was the first Old Member of the college to sit in the United States House of Representatives, where she represented New Mexico's 1st congressional district from 1998 to 2009. The Australian politician Neal Blewett was a member of the Australian House of Representatives from 1977 to 1994, a Government Minister from 1983 to 1994 and High Commissioner to the UK from 1994 to 1998. Pixley ka Isaka Seme, who studied for a BCL between 1906 and 1909, was one of the founder members of the African National Congress.

Civil servants and diplomats educated at Jesus College include Sir Edgar Vaughan (British Ambassador to Colombia from 1964 to 1966), Gunasena de Soyza (High Commissioner for Ceylon in Britain from 1960 to 1961), Sir Frederick Atkinson (Chief Economic Adviser to HM Treasury from 1977 to 1979), Sir Thomas Williams Phillips (Permanent Secretary of the Ministry of Labour from 1935 to 1944 and Chairman of the War Damage Commission from 1949 to 1959), Eryl Davies (a former Chief Inspector of Schools for Wales), and Christopher Lintrup Paus (a long-time British diplomat in Oslo).

=== Judges and lawyers ===
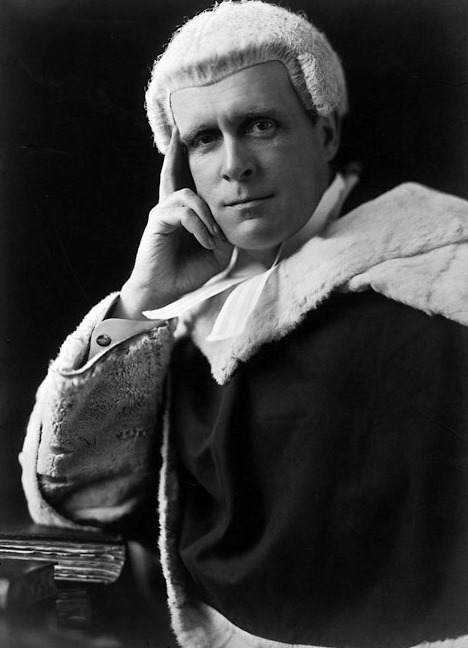
Viscount Sankey

Several prominent judges and lawyers were educated at the college. Viscount Sankey, who was Lord Chancellor from 1929 to 1935, studied for a BA in History and a BCL between 1885 and 1891. Lord du Parcq was appointed as a Lord of Appeal in Ordinary in 1946. Sir Richard Richards became Lord Chief Baron of the Exchequer in 1817. The Scottish MP and lawyer Lord Murray was appointed a Senator of the College of Justice in 1979. The solicitor Sir David Lewis was Lord Mayor of the City of London from 2007 to 2008. Other lawyers who studied at the college include James Chadwin QC, who defended the Yorkshire Ripper, and Sir Arthur James, who prosecuted the Great Train Robbers and later became a judge of the Court of Appeal. Academic lawyers include J Duncan M Derrett, Professor of Oriental Laws in the University of London from 1965 to 1982, and Alfred Hazel, Reader in English Law at All Souls College, Oxford.

=== Clergy ===
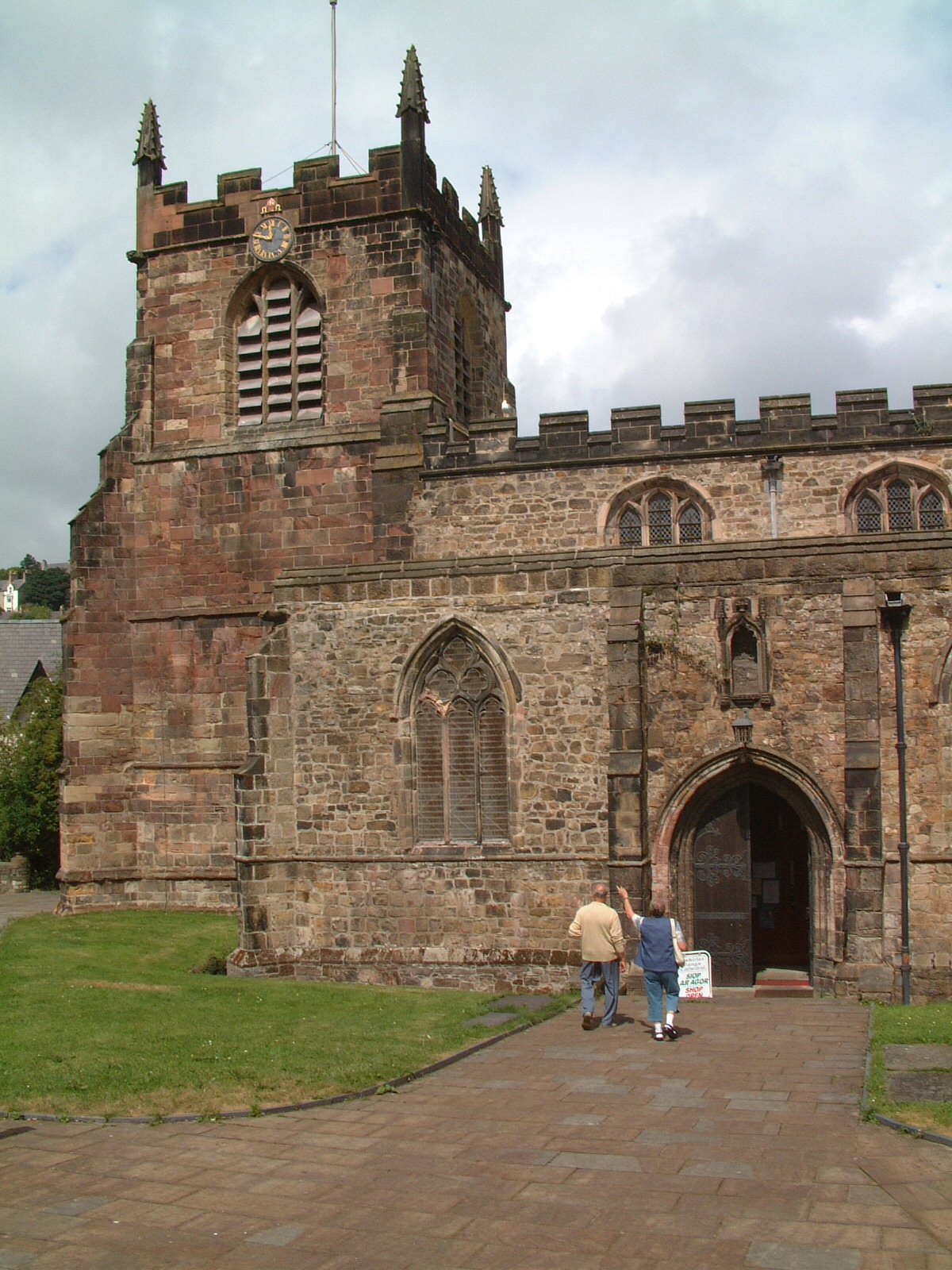
At least five former students of Jesus College have become Dean of Bangor Cathedral.

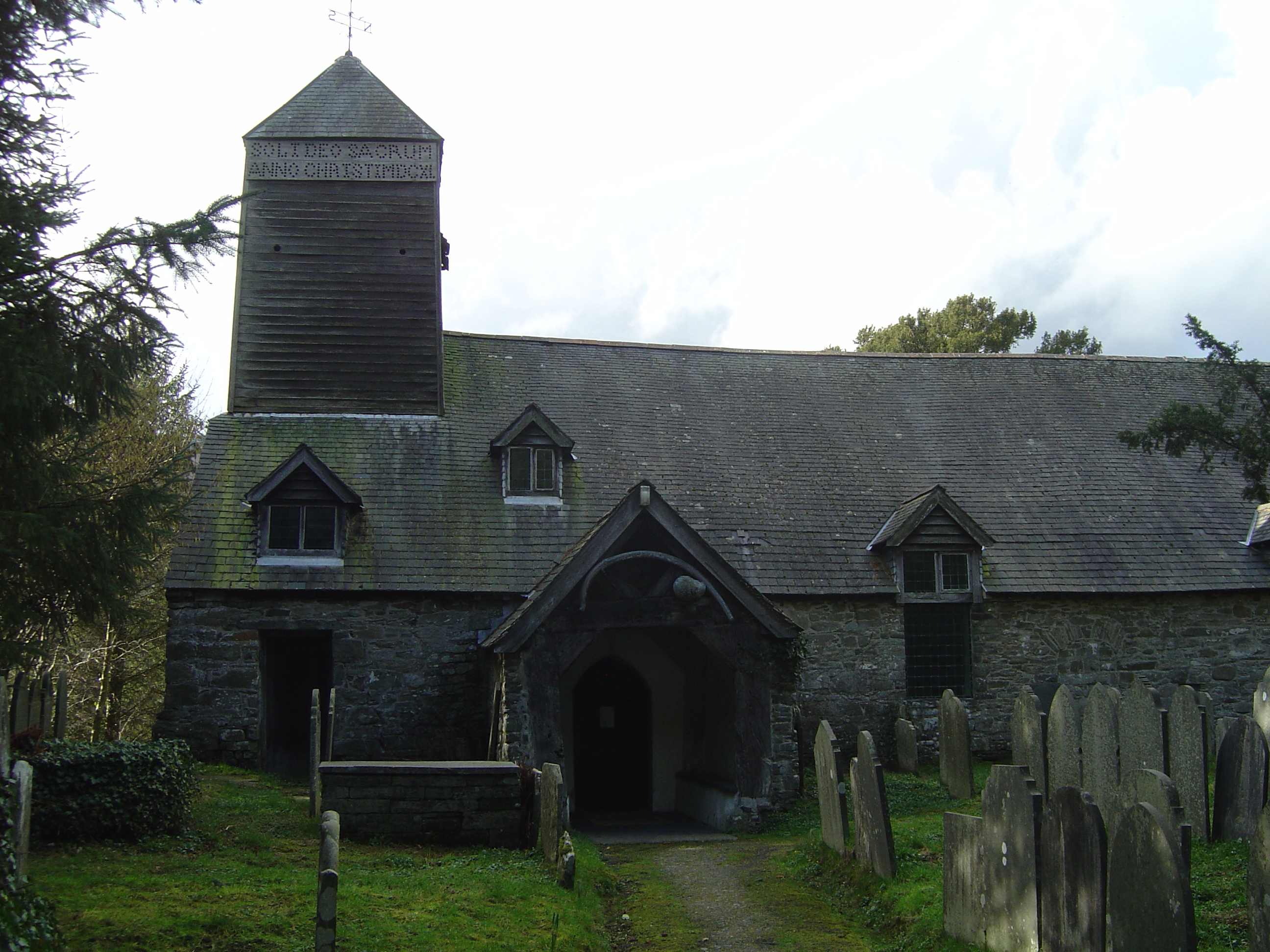
Mallwyd church, where John Davies was rector

Three Archbishops of Wales have studied at Jesus College. A. G. Edwards, the first archbishop of the Church in Wales after its disestablishment, read Literae Humaniores from 1871 to 1874, and was archbishop from 1920 to 1934. Glyn Simon, who was a student from 1922 to 1926, was Archbishop of Wales from 1968 to 1971. He was succeeded by Gwilym Williams, who was archbishop from 1971 to 1982.

Other bishops to have held office in Wales include Francis Davies, Roy Davies, John Harris, and Morgan Owen (who were all Bishops of Llandaff), Humphrey Humphreys, Daniel Lewis Lloyd and Humphrey Lloyd (who were Bishops of Bangor), William Lloyd and John Wynne (who were Bishops of St Asaph), and John Owen and William Thomas (who were Bishops of St David's). William Havard was a Welsh rugby international before becoming Bishop of St Asaph, then Bishop of St David's.

Former students of the college to have become bishops outside England and Wales include Rowland Ellis (Bishop of Aberdeen and Orkney from 1906 to 1911), Richard Meredith (Bishop of Leighlin from 1579 to 1597), and John Rider (Bishop of Killaloe 1612 to 1632). In the twentieth century, bishops to have studied at the college include Kenneth Cragg (assistant Bishop of Jerusalem from 1970 to 1973), John Dickinson (assistant Bishop of Melanesia from 1931 to 1937), Gordon Roe (Bishop of Huntingdon from 1980 to 1997), Alwyn Williams (Bishop of Durham from 1939 to 1952 and Bishop of Winchester from 1952 to 1961), and Clifford Woodward (Bishop of Bristol from 1933 to 1946 and Bishop of Gloucester from 1946 to 1953).

Several former students have been appointed as cathedral deans; many others became parish priests in Wales and elsewhere in the Anglican church, some also finding time for other activities such as writing poetry or pursuing antiquarian interests. At least five have been Dean of Bangor – Henry Edwards, Henry James, Evan Lewis, John Pryce and James Vincent. Llewelyn Hughes was Dean of Ripon from 1951 to 1967, Alex Wedderspoon was Dean of Guildford from 1987 to 2001, and Wesley Carr was Dean of Westminster Abbey from 1997 to 2006. Edmund Meyrick, who studied at the college between 1656 and 1659, became Treasurer of St David's Cathedral; his bequest founded the college's Meyrick scholarships for students from North Wales, and scholarships from this fund are still awarded. The lexicographer John Davies of Mallwyd, who translated the Bible into Welsh, studied at the college. In the mid-19th century, some Anglican priests were influenced by John Henry Newman and converted to Roman Catholicism, including David Lewis; Edmund Ffoulkes converted too, but later went back to Anglicanism, becoming vicar of the University Church of St Mary the Virgin in Oxford. John David Jenkins, who was Canon of Pietermaritzburg for a time, was later nicknamed the "Rail men's Apostle" for his ministry to railway workers in Oxford. David Thomas, a priest in Gwynedd, was instrumental in the foundation of a Welsh church in the Welsh settlement in Argentina.

Some students have become ministers in other denominations of Christianity. Methodists include David Charles and Christopher Bassett; Baptists include Gwilym Davies (the first person to broadcast on the radio in Welsh, in 1923); Welsh Presbyterians include William David Davies and Gwilym Edwards; Unitarians include John Islan Jones; and Catholics include John Hugh Jones and the Benedictine monk and poet Sylvester Houédard.

=== Military personnel ===
Military personnel educated at the college
Name	M	G	Degree	Notes	Ref.
Sir Henry Bagenal	1572/3	DNG	—	Bagenal left without taking a degree to support his father, who was marshal of the army in Ireland, and succeeded him in 1590. He was mortally wounded at the Battle of the Yellow Ford in 1598.	
Angus Buchanan	1913	1921	BA Jurisprudence (initially Literae Humaniores)	Buchanan won the Victoria Cross (1916) for conspicuous bravery in rescuing a severely wounded officer under fire. He was blinded when shot in 1917. On returning to the college in 1919, he read law and became president of the Jesus College Record.	
Jenkin Jones	1639	DNG	—	Captain in the Parliamentarian army during the English Civil War, and a Puritan preacher	
Sir Charles Kemeys, 2nd Baronet	1632	DNG	—	Royalist who fought during the English Civil War, attacking Cardiff and defending Pembroke Castle	
T. E. Lawrence	1907	1910	BA Modern History (1st)	"Lawrence of Arabia"	
Henry Lloyd	?	?	?	18th-century soldier who fought for various European countries (switching sides in the Seven Years' War) and whose writings on military theory were studied by George Washington and George S. Patton	
Jim Mauldon	1938	1947	BA Mathematics (1st)	Studies interrupted by military service during the Second World War, during which he won the Military Cross; later became professor of mathematics at Amherst College in the United States	
Sir Edward Morgan, 1st Baronet	1616	1619	BA	Royalist who held a commission during the Bishops' War and the English Civil War, before being captured at Hereford and suffering the sequestration of his estate	
Thomas Morgan	—	1790	?	Matriculated from Wadham College; a naval chaplain who was injured during the Glorious First of June battle and involved in the Spithead mutiny before becoming chaplain of the naval dockyard at Portsmouth	
Anton Muttukumaru	1928	1931	BA PPE (4th)	First Ceylonese-born officer to serve as Commander of the Ceylon Army (1955–59)	
Chris Parry	1972	1975	BA Modern History	Rear admiral and military strategist	

=== Celticists ===
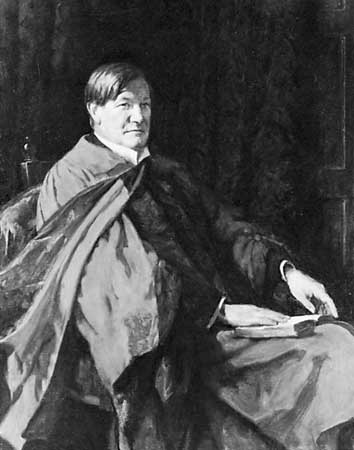
Sir John Morris-Jones

Name	M	G	Degree	Notes	Ref.
Ellis Evans (F/HF)	1952	1954	Graduate scholar	Jesus Professor of Celtic (1978–1996)	
R. Geraint Gruffydd (HF)	1948	1953	DPhil	Professor of Welsh at University of Wales, Aberystwyth (1970–1979) and Director of the Centre for Advanced Welsh and Celtic Studies (1985–1993)	
William John Gruffydd	1899	1903	BA English (2nd) (3rd in Classics Honour Mods)	Professor of Celtic at the University of Wales, Cardiff (1918–1946) (succeeding Thomas Powel, below); Liberal MP for the University of Wales constituency (1943–1950)	
William Henry Harris	1910	1913	BA Theology (1913, 2nd), BLitt (1913)	Precentor, canon and treasurer of St David's Cathedral; also professor of theology briefly before becoming professor of Welsh at St David's College, Lampeter	
George Henderson	1896	?	BLitt	Gaelic scholar and Church of Scotland minister, who became a lecturer in Celtic at the University of Glasgow	
John Jenkins	?	—	—	Welsh priest and antiquarian, known as Ifor Ceri, who helped to establish eisteddfodau in Wales in the early nineteenth century; graduated from Merton College	
Bedwyr Lewis Jones	1956	?	?	Professor of Welsh at the University of Wales, Bangor	
John Jones	1814	1818	BA Mathematics (2nd)	Welsh clergyman and scholar (bardic name Ioan Tegid), who transcribed the Red Book of Hergest for Lady Charlotte Guest	
Henry Lewis	?	?	?	Professor of Welsh at University College, Swansea (1921–1954)	
John Lloyd-Jones	1907	?	BLitt	First Professor of Welsh at the National University of Ireland, Dublin	
Derec Llwyd Morgan (F/HF)	1964	1969	DPhil	Professor of Welsh (1989–1995) then vice-chancellor and principal (1995–2004), University of Wales, Aberystwyth	
Sir John Morris-Jones (F)	1883	1888	BA Mathematics (3rd, 1887), then research in Welsh	Professor of Welsh at University College of North Wales, Bangor (1895–1929), who had been awarded a one-year scholarship for research in Welsh with John Rhys	
John Owen	1872	1876	BA Mathematics (2nd) (2nd in Mods in Classics and in Mathematics)	Professor of Welsh (1879–1889) and principal (1892–1897) at St David's College, Lampeter before becoming Bishop of St David's (1897–1926)	
Sir Thomas (T. H.) Parry-Williams (HF)	1909	1911	BLitt	Professor of Welsh at the University of Wales, Aberystwyth (1920–1952)	
Thomas Powel	1869	1872	BA Literae Humaniores (3rd)	Professor of Celtic at University College, Cardiff (1884–1918) (succeeded by William John Gruffydd, above)	
Llywarch Reynolds	1868	1875	BA	Welsh solicitor and Celtic scholar; many of the antiquarian manuscripts he collected are now held by the National Library of Wales	
Sir John Rhys (HF/F/P)	1865	1869	BA Literae Humaniores (1st)	First Jesus Professor of Celtic (1877–1915)	
Evan Thomas	1891	1895	BA Theology (2nd)	Professor of Welsh at St David's College, Lampeter (1903–1915), where he helped to revive the position of Welsh in the college and curriculum	
John Williams	1832	1838	BA Mathematics (4th, 1835), MA (1838)	Priest and Welsh scholar (bardic name Ab Ithel), who edited Y Gododdin and completed Aneurin Owen's edition of Annales Cambriae	

=== Classicists and archeologists ===
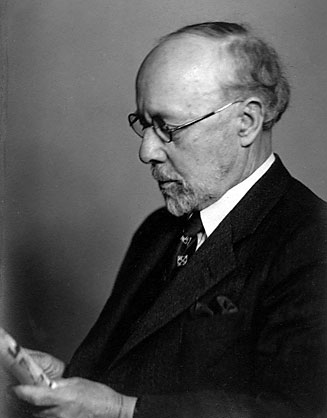
John Garstang

Name	M	G	Degree	Notes	Ref.
William Boyd Dawkins (HF)	1854	1860	BA Natural Science (1st)	Geologist and archeologist	
John Craig	1908	1912	BA Literae Humaniores (2nd)	Firth Professor of Latin at the University of Sheffield (1930–1952)	
Percy Dodd (F)	1907	1911	BA Literae Humaniores (1st)	Lecturer at Leeds University then a college fellow; career cut short by ill-health	
Edward Edwards	1743	1747	BA	Cleric, with a particular interest in Xenophon's Memorabilia	
Thomas Iorwerth Ellis	1920	1923	BA Literae Humaniores (3rd)	Academic at University College, Swansea, St David's College, Lampeter and the University College of Wales, Aberystwyth; secretary of the New Wales Union for 25 years; publications included a biography of his father T. E. Ellis	
Sir Emrys Evans	1913	?	BLitt	First professor of classics at Swansea University, later principal of University College, Bangor	
John Garstang (HF)	1895	1899	BA Mathematics (3rd)	Archeologist	
Harold Arthur Harris	1921	1925	BA English (1st) (1st in Classics Honour Mods)	Professor of Classics at St David's College, Lampeter(1934–1968)	
Barri Jones	1955	1963	BA Literae Humaniores; DPhil	Classical scholar and archaeologist	
Griffith Hartwell Jones	1879	1883	BA Literae Humaniores (2nd)	Professor of Latin at the University College of South Wales and Monmouthshire, Cardiff, chairman of both the National Eisteddfod Association and the Honourable Society of Cymmrodorion	
Terence Mitford	?	?	BA Literae Humaniores	Archeologist at the University of St Andrews, with a particular interest in Cyprus; an officer in the Special Air Service during the Second World War	
Percy Seymour (F)	?	1912	BA Literae Humaniores (1st)	Australian classicist, and college bursar (1930–1935)	
John Strugnell	1947	1954	BA Literae Humaniores, MA Oriental Languages	Dead Sea Scrolls scholar, and Professor of Christian Origins at Harvard Divinity School	

=== Geographers, geologists and cartographers ===
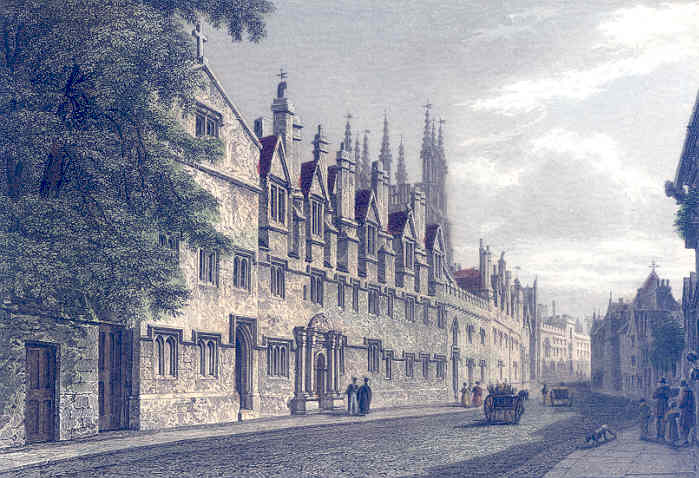
St Alban Hall, to which John Evans transferred after his matriculation at Jesus College

Name	M	G	Degree	Notes	Ref.
J. N. L. Baker (F)	1913	1922	BA Modern History (1920), Diploma in Geography (1921), BLitt	Geographer, with particular interest in the history of geography, College Bursar and geography tutor, and author of Jesus College 1571–1971	
John Evans	1773	—	—	Transferred to St Alban Hall; a Welsh surgeon and cartographer, who reprinted his father's celebrated maps of North Wales and later produced his own edition	
James Fairgrieve	1891	1895	BA Mathematics (2nd)	Human geographer and educator	
John House	1937	1940	BA Geography (2nd)	Halford Mackinder Professor of Geography at Oxford (1974–1983)	
Henry Yule Oldham	1882	1886	BA Natural Science (Animal Morphology) (2nd)	Geographer who conducted the definitive version of the Bedford Level experiment in 1901, proving that the earth was a sphere	
Robert Steel (F/HF)	1934	1937	BA Geography (1st)	Professor of geography at the University of Liverpool (1957–1974), then principal of the University College of Swansea (1974–1982)	
David Williams	1810	1814	BA	Anglican priest in Bleadon, Somerset and geologist who wrote extensively of the geology of the west of England	

=== Historians and antiquarians ===
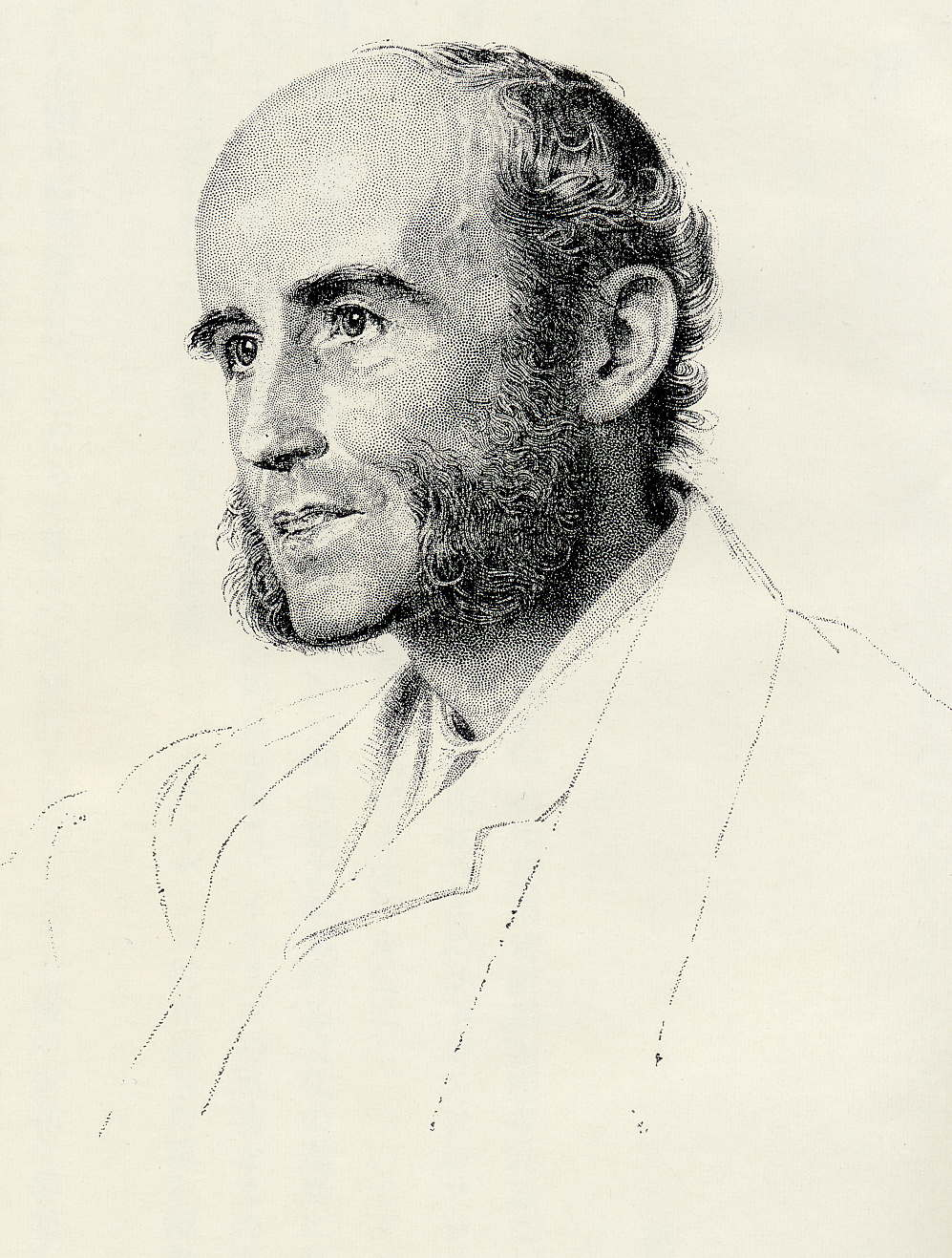
John Richard Green

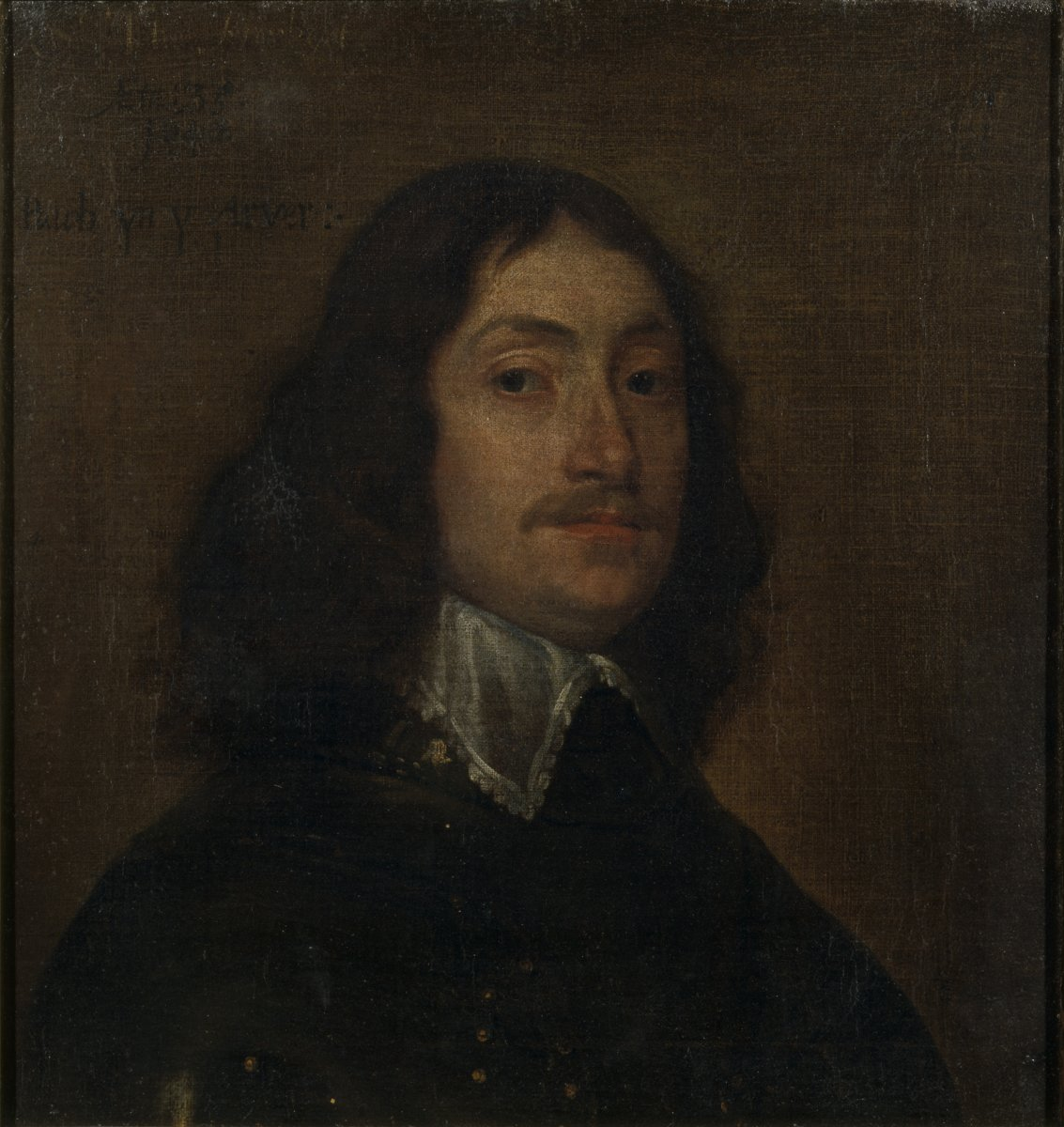
Sir Thomas Herbert

Name	M	G	Degree	Notes	Ref.
Warren Ault (HF)	1907	1910	BA Modern History (2nd)	One of the college's first two Rhodes Scholars; taught history at Boston University from 1913 to 1957, becoming Huntington Professor of History	
Theo Barker	1941	1948	BA Modern History (1st)	Social and economic historian, who was a professor at the University of Kent and the London School of Economics	
James Burke	1957	1961	BA English (3rd)	Science historian	
George Wingrove Cooke	1830	1834	BA Literae Humaniores (4th)	Barrister and historian, whose first book (Memoirs of Lord Bolingbroke) was written whilst Cooke was an undergraduate	
William Cronon	1976	1978	DPhil	Historian of environmental change, Bancroft Prize winner and MacArthur Fellow who completed his doctorate in unusually short time of two years	
Sir Goronwy Edwards (F/HF)	1909	1913	BA Modern History (1st)	Welsh historian who became director of the Institute of Historical Research and professor of history at the University of London	
John Ellis (F)	1690	1696	BA (1693), MA (1696)	Welsh cleric and antiquarian	
Richard Ellis	1898	1902	BA	Assistant librarian of the National Library of Wales, whose main research interest was the life and work of Edward Lhuyd	
Thomas Ellis (F)	1640	1646	BA (1644), MA (1646)	Welsh clergyman and historian	
Richard Evans (HF)	1966	1969	BA Modern History (1st)	Historian, specialising in modern German history, who was principal defence expert witness for Deborah Lipstadt when she was sued for libel by David Irving	
Richard Farrington	1720	1724	BA	Welsh priest and antiquarian, with a particular interest in Caernarfonshire; Chancellor of Bangor Cathedral	
Albert Goodwin (F)	1924	1928	BA Modern History (1st)	Professor of Modern History at the University of Manchester	
John Richard Green (HF)	1856	1859	Pass degree	Historian, author of A History of the English people (four volumes)	
Sir John Rigby Hale (F/HF)	1945	1948	BA Modern History (1st) (top of year)	Historian of the Renaissance	
Yuval Noah Harari	1999	2002	DPhil	Historian, author of the popular science bestsellers Sapiens: A Brief History of Humankind (2014), Homo Deus: A Brief History of Tomorrow (2016), and 21 Lessons for the 21st Century (2018).	
Sir Thomas Herbert, 1st Baronet	?	DNG	—	Gentleman of the bedchamber to Charles I, who wrote an account of the last two years of the king's life entitled Threnodia Carolina	
Edward Ernest Hughes	?	1902	BA Modern History (2nd)	The first Professor of History at University College, Swansea (1926–1944)	
Colin Jones	?	1971	BA Modern History and Modern Languages (French)	Professor of History at Queen Mary, University of London since 2006	
John Jones	1804	1808	?	Cleric in Caernarfonshire and antiquarian	
Maldwyn Jones	1946	1949	BA Modern History (1st)	Commonwealth Professor of American History, University College, London (1971–1988)	
John Lloyd	1753	1757	BA	Cleric (at Caerwys and Nannerch) and antiquarian	
John Le Patourel	1928	1933	BA Modern History (1st, 1931), DPhil (	Professor of Medieval History at the University of Leeds (1945–1970), with a particular interest in the history of the Channel Islands	
John Duncan Mackie	1904	1908	BA Modern History (1st)	Professor of Scottish History and Literature, University of Glasgow (1930–1957) and Historiographer Royal (appointed in 1957)	
John Mason	1938	1947	BA Modern History (1st)	Studies interrupted by war service; Student (i.e. Fellow) of Christ Church, Oxford 1957–1987; historian of the Norman Conquest and of his home town of Bridgnorth, Shropshire	
John Morris	1932	1935	BA Modern History (2nd)	Lecturer in Ancient History at University College, London	
Nicholas Owen	1769	1776	BA (1773), MA (1776)	Welsh Anglican clergyman and antiquarian	
Glen O'Hara	1993	1997	BA Modern History (1st, 1996), MSc Economic and Social History (Distinction, 1997)	Senior Lecturer in Modern History, Oxford Brookes University	
Henry Parry	1786	1790	BA	Welsh cleric and antiquarian	
William Parry (F)	1706	1712	BA (1709), MA (1712), BD (1719)	Antiquarian and rector of Shipston-on-Stour, Warwickshire	
John Pettingall	1725	1728	BA	Antiquarian and priest	
Albert Pollard (HF)	1887	1891	BA Modern History (1st) (2nd in Classics Honour Mods)	Captain of Boats whilst at college; a historian, particularly of Henry VIII, and former Assistant Editor of the Oxford Dictionary of National Biography	
David Powel	?	1576	BA (1573), MA (1576), BTh and DTh (1583)	Matriculation college unknown, but moved to Jesus on its foundation and thought to be the first person to graduate from Jesus; published The Historie of Cambria, now called Wales, the first printed history of Wales (1584)	
Rice Rees (F)	1822	1828	BA Literae Humaniores (3rd, 1826), MA (1826)	Cleric and author of The Welsh Saints (1836)	
Henry Rice	1607	1607	BA	Matriculated 10 days before graduation; a gentleman at the court of King Charles I, whose writings included a Life of Sir Rhys ap Thomas, one of his ancestors	
William Rider	—	1745	BA	Matriculated from St Mary Hall before transferring to the college; a cleric and writer, whose 50-volume work A New History of England was later described as one of the vilest Grub Street compilations ever published	
Susobhan Sarkar	1923	1925	BA Modern History (1st)	Indian historian, who was professor of history at Presidency College, Calcutta (1932–1956), Jadavpur University (1956–1961) and Calcutta University (1961–1967)	
David Thomas	1852	1856	BA Literae Humaniores (3rd)	Canon of St Asaph and Archdeacon of Montgomery; wrote History of the Diocese of St Asaph, the first such history of a Welsh diocese	
John Thomas	1755	1758	BA	Welsh cleric and antiquarian, who collected and transcribed manuscripts, and wrote a History of the Island of Anglesey (1775); elder brother of Richard Thomas, who also attended the college	
Richard Thomas	1771	1775	BA	Welsh cleric and antiquarian, who collected and transcribed manuscripts; younger brother of John Thomas, who also attended the college	
Arthur Wade-Evans	1893	1896	BA	Historian of early Britain, the Celtic church and medieval Welsh law	
Thomas Wilkins	1641	1661	? (Law)	Welsh cleric and antiquarian, from whose collection of manuscripts the Red Book of Hergest was donated to the college after his death	
Alfred Wood	1919	1923	BA Modern History (1st, 1921), BLitt (1923)	Professor of History at the University of Nottingham (1951–1960)	
William Wynne (F)	1688	1691	BA	Welsh cleric who wrote a History of Wales (1697), a revised version of David Powel's history; younger brother of the priest Robert Wynne	

=== Language and literature academics ===
Name	M	G	Degree	Notes	Ref.
Fred Bachrach	1948	?	DPhil	Dutch art and literature academic	
William Brice	1939	1946	BA Geography (1st)	Studies interrupted by war service; an ethnographer and linguist who worked on Linear A	
Angus Cameron	1961	1968	BA (1963), BLitt (1968)	Canadian Rhodes Scholar, who lectured at Mount Allison University after achieving his BA before returning for a post-graduate degree, his thesis being entitled "Old English nouns of colour: a semantic study"; a lexicographer of Old English and a professor at the University of Toronto	
J. P. Collas	1929	1934	BA French (1st, 1932), BLitt (1934)	Norman-French scholar and Professor of French at Queen Mary College, London (1953–1976), regarded as one of the leading philologists of his generation	
John Fleming	1958	1961	BA English (2nd)	Former Professor of English at Princeton University	
Andrew Goatly	1969	1972	BA English (2nd)	Professor of English at Lingnan University, Hong Kong	
Stephen Thomas Knight	1959	1962	BA English (2nd)	Professor of English at Cardiff University with a particular interest in medieval literature, Robin Hood and King Arthur	
Reuben Levy	1912	1914	BA Oriental Studies (2nd)	Professor of Persian at the University of Cambridge	
Meirion Pennar	?	?	DPhil	Welsh literature academic and poet	
Graham Pollard	1921	1924	BA Modern History (3rd)	Bookseller and bibliographer; Reader in Bibliography at the University of Oxford (1961)	
Richard Sayce	1934	1937	BA French and German (1st)	Reader in French Literature at Oxford, and a Fellow of Worcester College	
William Davies Thomas	1911	1913	BA English (1st)	Professor of English at the University of Saskatchewan (1919–1921), and the first Professor of English language and literature at University College, Swansea (1921–1954)	
Leslie Walton	1918	1926	BA Spanish (1st) (1920), BLitt (1926)	Forbes Reader in Spanish at the University of Edinburgh, head of the Department of Hispanic Studies	

=== Philosophers and theologians ===
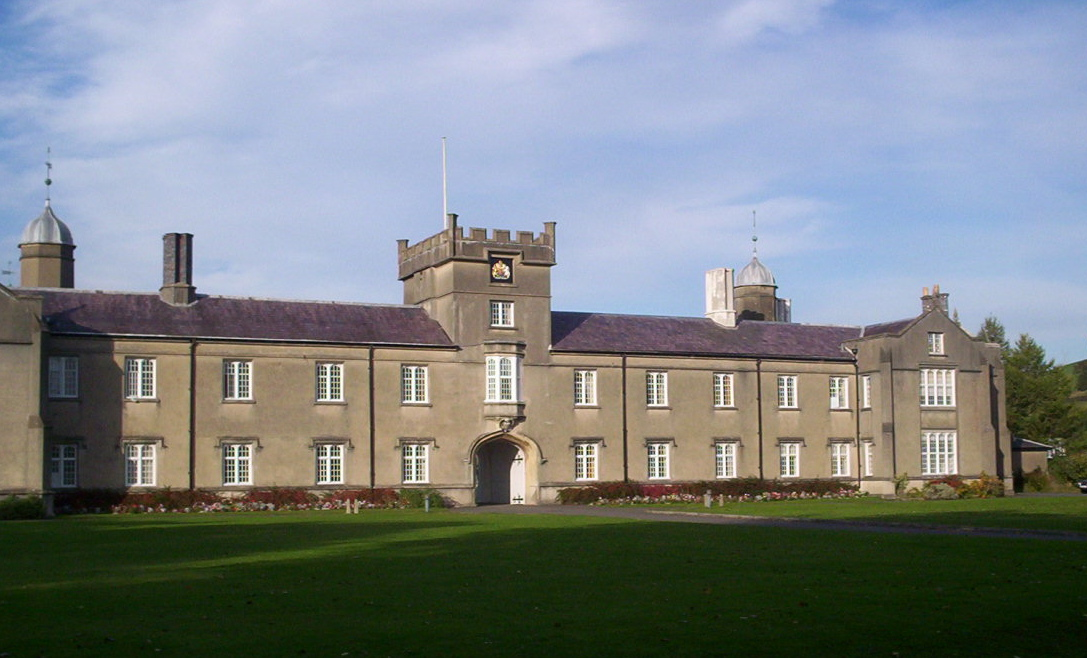
The St David's Building at the University of Wales, Lampeter, where Paul Badham was appointed a professor in 1991

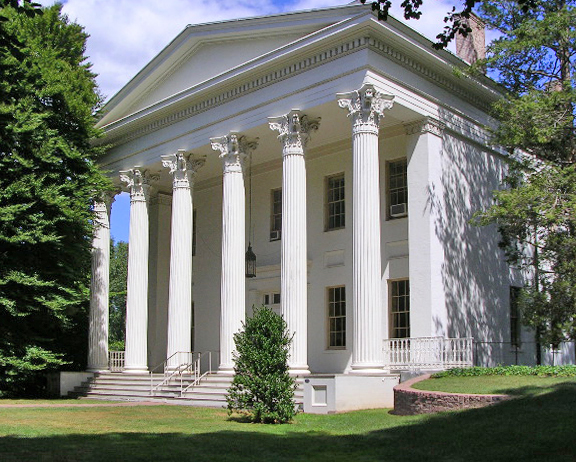
The Samuel Wadsworth Russell House at Wesleyan University, home to the Philosophy department, where Philip Hallie was a professor from 1965 to 1988

Name	M	G	Degree	Notes	Ref.
Paul Badham	1962	1965	BA Theology (2nd)	Professor of Theology and Religious Studies at the University of Wales, Lampeter since 1991	
J. E. Daniel	1919	1925	BA Literae Humaniores (1924, 1st), BA Theology (1925, 1st)	Welsh theologian (a professor at Bala-Bangor Theological Seminary) who was also chairman of Plaid Cymru (1939–1943)	
William David Davies	1915	?	BA Literae Humaniores (2nd, 1921), BA Theology (1st, 1922), BD	Welsh Presbyterian minister who was the first Welsh non-conformist to obtain a BD from Oxford, and who turned down a university tutorship in theology since it required membership of the Church of England; Professor of the history of religions and the philosophy of religion at the United Theological College Aberystwyth (1928–1933)	
Walter Evans-Wentz	1907	?	BSc in Folklore	Anthropologist and writer who made a particular study of Tibetan Buddhism	
S. H. Hooke (HF)	1907	1912	BA Theology 1910 (1st), BA Oriental Languages (2nd)	Biblical scholar, who was Professor of Old Testament Studies at the University of London	
Hywel Lewis (HF)	1933	1935	BLitt	Welsh philosopher and theologian, who was Professor of the History and Philosophy of Religion at the University of London (1955–1977)	
Henry Maurice (F)	1664	1668	BA (1668), MA (1671), BD (1679), DD (1683)	Treasurer of Chichester Cathedral, who was elected Lady Margaret Professor of Divinity at Oxford shortly before his death in 1691	
Huw Owen	1944	1949	BA Theology (2nd)	Welsh Presbyterian minister, who was Professor of Christian Doctrine at King's College London (1971–1983)	
Robert Owen (F)	1838	1845	BA Literae Humaniores (3rd, 1842), MA (1845), BD (1852)	Theologian and antiquarian, who wrote An Introduction to the Study of Dogmatic Theology and Institutes of Canon Law but who was forced to resign his fellowship after an allegation of immorality	
Philip Hallie	1949	1951	BLitt	Fulbright Scholar from the United States; William Griffin Professor of Philosophy and Humanities at Wesleyan University (1965–1988)	
Griffith Powell (F/P)	1581	1593	BA (1584), MA (1589), BCL	Aristotelian philosopher	
Clement Rogers	1885	1889	BA Theology (2nd)	Professor of Pastoral Theology at King's College, London (1919–1932)	
Cecil Weir	?	1930	DPhil	Theologian who was Professor of Hebrew and Semitic Languages, Glasgow at the University of Glasgow (1937–1968)	

=== Mathematics, medicine and science ===
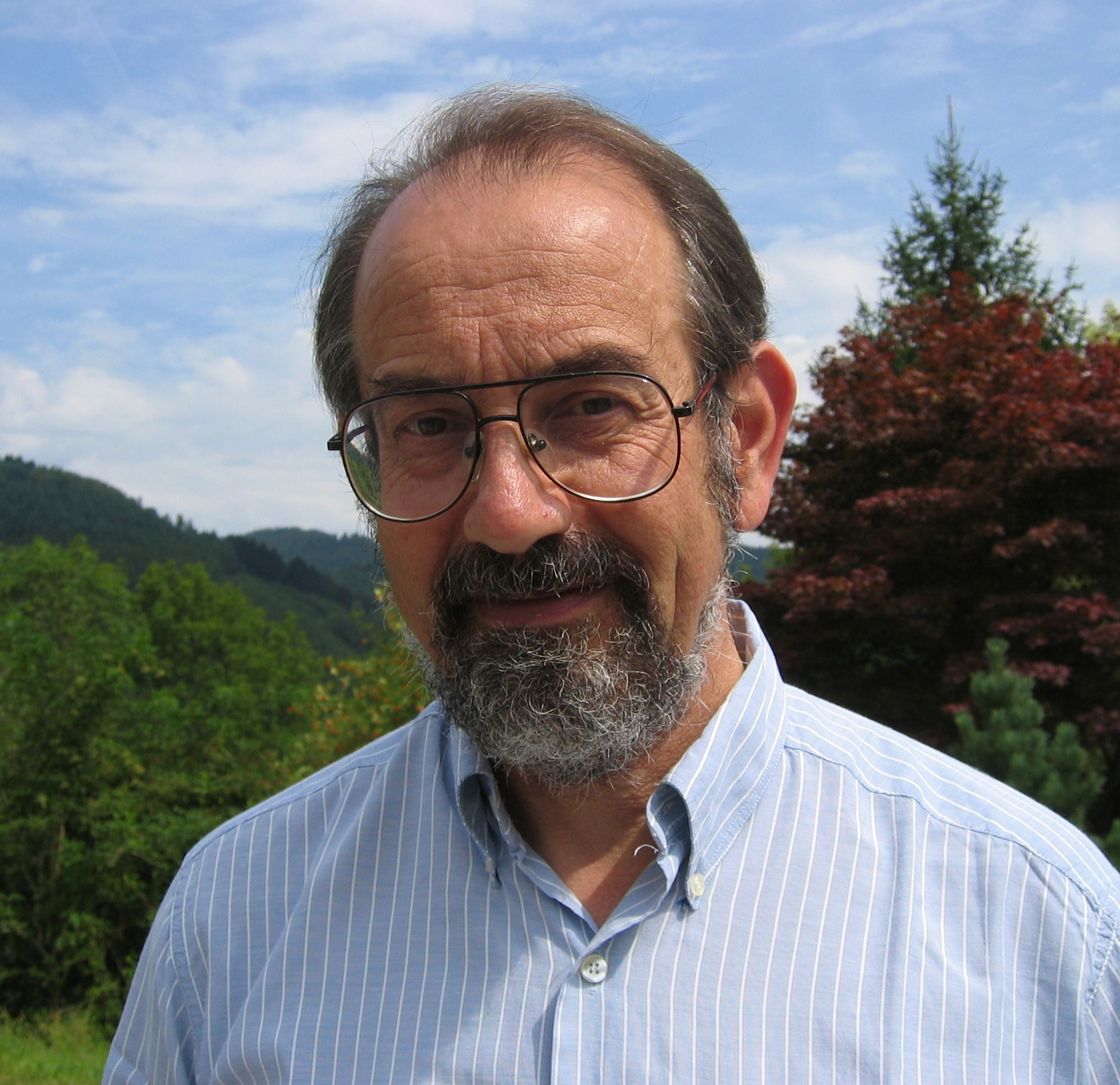
Nigel Hitchin

Mathematicians to have studied at Jesus College include Nigel Hitchin (Savilian Professor of Geometry at Oxford since 1997), the Canadian Jonathan Borwein and Jim Mauldon (who taught at Oxford before moving to the United States to teach at Amherst College, Massachusetts). David E. Evans is professor of mathematics at Cardiff University, and H. W. Lloyd Tanner was Professor of Mathematics and Astronomy at one of its predecessor institutions, the University College of South Wales and Monmouthshire. Several noted individuals from biology, botany and zoology were educated at the college, including the Welsh clergyman Hugh Davies (whose Welsh Botanology of 1813 cross-referenced the Welsh-language and the scientific names of plants), Edward Bagnall Poulton (Professor of Zoology at Oxford) and James Brontë Gatenby (Professor of Zoology at Trinity College, Dublin). Frank Greenaway was Keeper of the Department of Chemistry at the Science Museum in London for over 20 years, and the physicist Chris Rapley was appointed director of the museum in 2007. Other physicists who are Old Members of the college include Michael Woolfson (a former Professor of Physics at the University of York) and Edward Hinds (whose work on ultra-cold matter won him the Rumford Medal of the Royal Society in 2008). Edwin Stevens, who studied Natural Science at the college, went on to design the world's first wearable hearing aid, and Sir Graham Sutton became director-general of the Meteorological Office.

=== Other academics ===
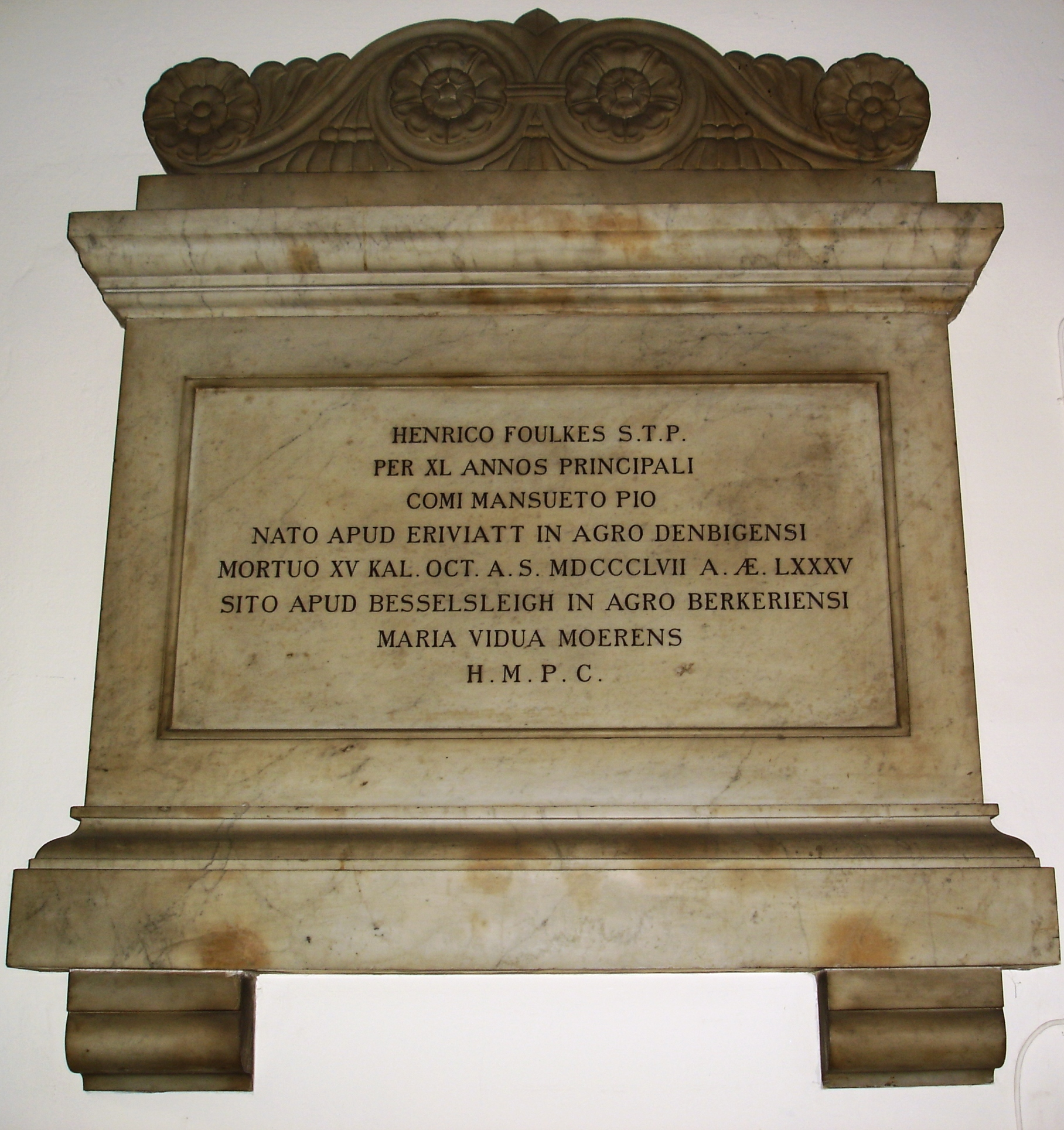
The memorial stone to Henry Foulkes in the college chapel

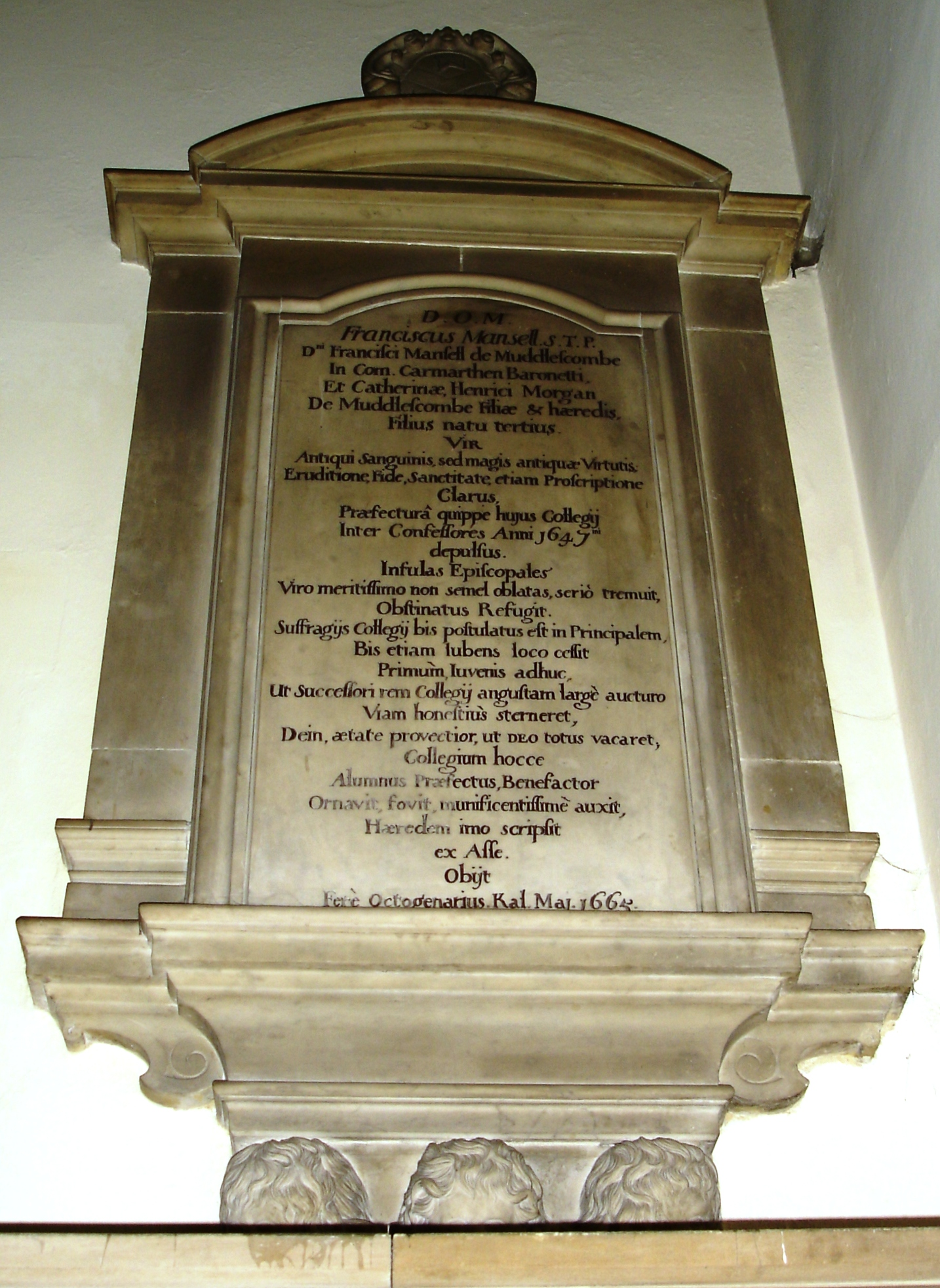
The memorial stone to Francis Mansell in the college chapel

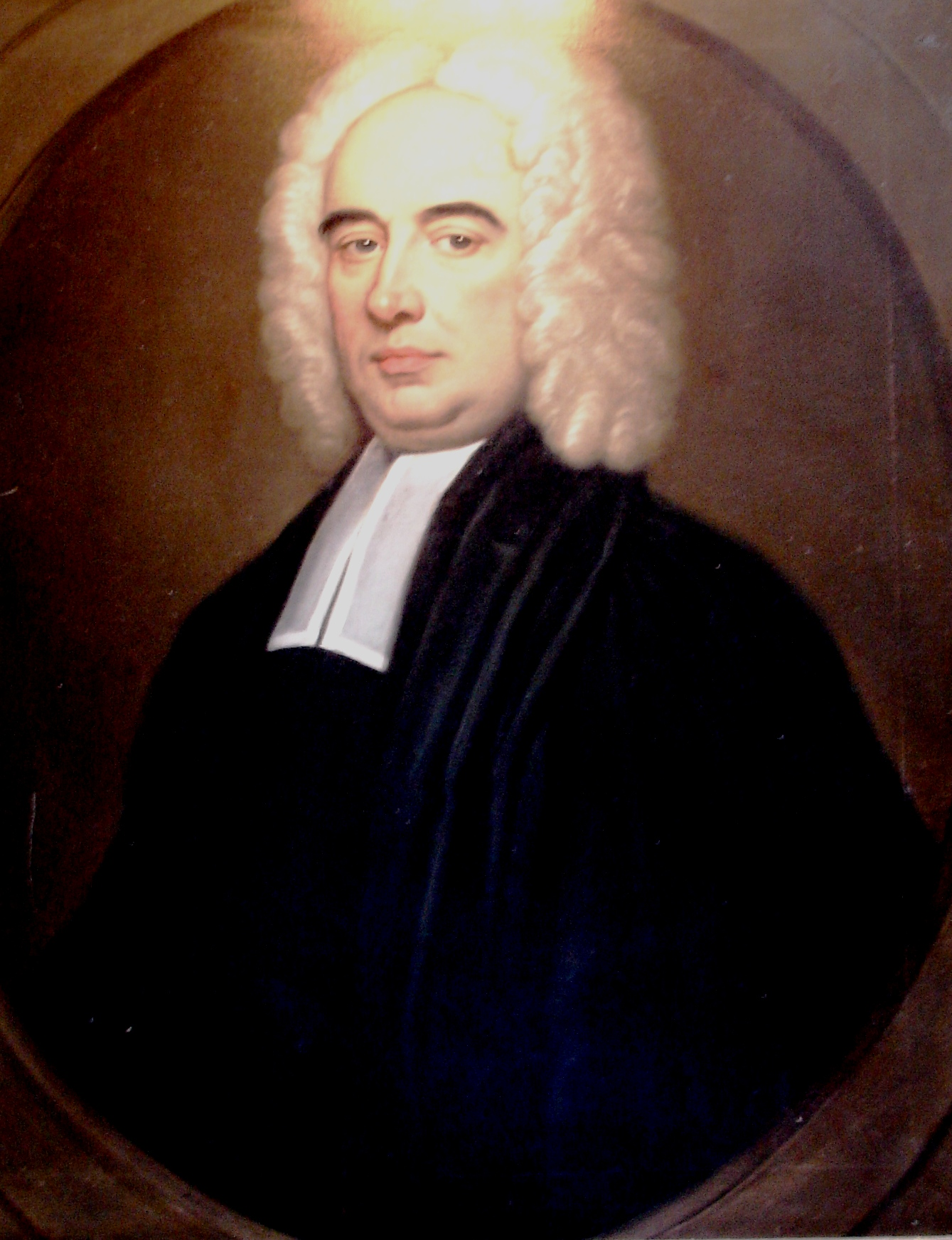
Thomas Pardo, Principal of Jesus College (1727–1763), and also Chancellor of St David's Cathedral (1749–1753)

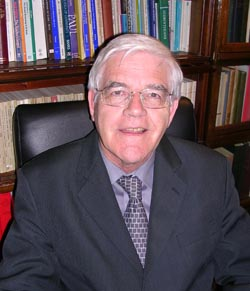
John Tudno Williams

Name	M	G	Degree	Notes	Ref.
John Adair	?	1971	BLitt	Author and academic on leadership studies; Professor of Leadership Studies at the University of Surrey (1979–1984); visiting professor at the University of Exeter (1990–2000); Honorary Professor of Leadership at the China Executive Leadership Academy in Pudong since 2006	
Henry Bould (F)	1621	1624	BA (1621), MA (1624)	Named as one of the founding scholars in the college's charter (1622); Fellow (1623–1628)	
Joseph Clearihue	1911	1914	BA Jurisprudence (2nd, 1913), BCL (3rd, 1914)	Canadian Rhodes scholar, who later became a member of the Legislative Assembly of British Columbia and a county court judge; also chairman of the council of Victoria College, British Columbia (which became the University of Victoria under his leadership)	
Sir Goronwy Daniel (HF)	1937	1940	DPhil	Permanent Under-Secretary of the Welsh Office (1964–1969), Principal of University of Wales, Aberystwyth (1969–1979)	
Walter Jenkin Evans	?	1878	BA	Principal of Carmarthen Presbyterian College (1888–1927)	
Robert Gentilis	—	1603	BA	Academic and translator who matriculated from Christ Church at the age of eight, graduated at the age of twelve and became a Fellow of All Souls at seventeen; eldest son of Alberico Gentili, the Italian jurist and Regius Professor of Civil Law	
Lewis Gilbertson (F)	1833	1839	BA Literae Humaniores (3rd, 1836), MA (1839), BD (1847)	Vicar in parishes in Cardiganshire, and also served as Vice-Principal	
Joseph Hoare (F/P)	1727	1733	BA (1730), MA	Prebend of Westminster Abbey; died after being scratched by his cat	
David Hughes (F/P)	1770	1776	BA (1773), MA (1776), BD (1783), DD (1790)	Principal (1802–1817)	
Henry Foulkes (F/P)	1790	1797	BA (1794), MA (1797), BD (1804), DD (1817)	Principal for 40 years (1817–1857)	
Francis Heiser	?	1907	BA Theology (2nd)	Principal of Fourah Bay College, Sierra Leone (1920–1922), Principal of St Aidan's Theological College, Birkenhead (1929–1950)	
Wilfred Hinton	?	?	BA	Professor of Political Economy at the University of Hong Kong (1913–1929), Director of Studies for the Institute of Bankers (1929–1949), and an expert in Far Eastern international affairs	
George Howells	?	?	BLitt	Principal of Serampore College, India (1907–1932)	
Gwilliam Iwan Jones	1923	1926	BA Modern History (2nd)	Colonial civil servant who photographed life in Nigeria in the 1930s, later becoming an anthropologist and Fellow of Jesus College, Cambridge	
Maurice Jones (F/HF)	1882	1886	BA Divinity (1st, 1886), BD (1907), DD (1914)	Welsh clergyman and principal of St David's College, Lampeter (1923–1938)	
Thomas Jones	1827	1832	BA	Librarian of Chetham's Library, Manchester (1845–1875)	
William Jones (F/P)	1694	1700	BA (1697), MA (1700), BD (1708), DD (1720)	Principal (1720–1725)	
Deepak Lal	1960	1965	BA PPE (1962), BPhil (Economics, 1965)	Development economist; James S. Coleman Professor of International Development Studies at the University of California, Los Angeles since 1991	
Llewelyn Lewellin	1818	1827	BA Literae Humaniores (1st, 1822), MA (1824), BCL (1827), DCL (1829)	First Principal of St David's College, Lampeter (1828–1878), also Dean of St David's (1843–1878)	
Harold Loukes	1930	1934	BA English (1st)	Taught at the University of Delhi before spending 30 years in the Department of Education at Oxford, most of them as Reader in Education	
Francis Mansell (P)	1607	1611	BA (1609), MA (1611)	Elected a Fellow of All Souls in 1613; Principal of Jesus College on three occasions	
Rupert Morris	1861	1865	BA Literae Humaniores (2nd)	Principal of Carmarthen Training College (1869–1876), headmaster of Godolphin School (1876–1884); clergyman and antiquarian	
Humphrey Owen (F/P)	1718	1733	BA (1722), MA (1725), BD (1733), DD (1763)	Bodley's Librarian (1747–1768)	
Thomas Pardo (F/P)	1707	1711	BA (1708), MA (1711), BD (1719), DD (1727)	Chancellor of St David's (1749–1753)	
David Parry	1701	1708	BA (1705), MA (1708)	Keeper of the Ashmolean Museum (1709–1714)	
John Price	1754	1760	BA (1757), MA (1760), BD (1768)	Bodley's Librarian for 45 years (1768–1813)	
Theodore Price (F)	?	1591	BA (1588), MA (1591)	Prebend of Westminster Abbey and principal of Hart Hall, Oxford	
Robert Rowthorn	?	?	BA Mathematics (1st), BPhil Economics	Professor of Economics at the University of Cambridge and Fellow of King's College, Cambridge (1991–2006)	
Robert Skidelsky, Baron Skidelsky (HF)	1958	1965	BA Modern History (2nd, 1961), DPhil Social Studies	Economist and biographer of John Maynard Keynes	
Sir Ben Bowen Thomas (HF)	1920	1922	BA Modern History (2nd)	Permanent Secretary to the Welsh Department of the Department of Education (1945–1963), President of University College of Wales, Aberystwyth (1964–1975)	
John Lloyd Thomas	1930	1932	BA Theology (2nd)	Principal of St David's College, Lampeter (1953–1975)	
Llewellyn Thomas (F)	1860	1865	BA Literae Humaniores (3rd)	Welsh cleric, poet and scholar, who was the college's Welsh reader, senior tutor and vice-principal	
David Williams	?	1903	BA Literae Humaniores (2nd, 1902), BA Theology (2nd, 1903)	Welsh Calvinistic Methodist minister and professor at the United Theological College Aberystwyth	
John Tudno Williams	1957	1960	BA Theology (2nd)	Lecturer, then principal (1998–2003) of the United Theological College Aberystwyth, and Moderator of the General Assembly of the Presbyterian Church of Wales (2006–2007)	
William Christopher Wordsworth	?	1903	BA Literae Humaniores (1st)	Professor of political economy (and later principal) of the Presidency College, Calcutta, who was also a journalist for The Statesman and The Times	

=== Educators ===
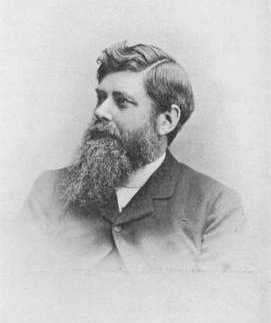
Herbert Armitage James

Name	M	G	Degree	Notes	Ref.
Alan Aldous	1942	1948	BA English (2nd)	Headmaster of Leeds Grammar School (1970–1975)	
Edward Barnwell	1830	1834	BA Mathematics (1st)	Headmaster of Ruthin School (1839–1865), succeeding Charles Williams	
Edmund Brice	1648	1650	BA	Translator and schoolmaster, and follower of the Christian mystic John Pordage	
John Caldicott	—	1851	BA Literae Humaniores (2nd, 1851), BA Mathematics (3rd, 1851), BD and DD (1874)	Matriculated from Pembroke College; Anglican priest and headmaster of Bristol Grammar School	
J. R. Cohu (F)	1876	1880	BA Literae Humaniores (1st, 1880), MA (1883)	Headmaster, clergyman and writer on biblical topics	
William Weekes Fowler	—	1873	BA	Matriculated at New College before transferring to Jesus with a scholarship; a clergyman, headmaster (of Lincoln School) and entomologist who was President of the Incorporated Association of Head Masters and President of the Entomological Society of London	
Daniel Harper (F/P)	1840	1844	BA Mathematics (1st)	Headmaster of Cowbridge Grammar School (1847–1850) and Sherborne School (1851–1877)	
John Haycraft	1948	1951	BA Modern History (2nd)	English language teacher and founder of International House World Organisation	
Herbert Armitage James	1863	—	—	Transferred to Lincoln College when he won a scholarship in 1864; later headmaster of Rugby School and President of St John's College, Oxford	
Robert James	1924	1928	BA Literae Humaniores (1st)	Son of Henry James, Dean of Bangor; High Master of St Paul's School (1946–1953) and Headmaster of Harrow School (1953–1971)	
Harold Littler	?	1910	BA Modern History (2nd)	Anglican priest and headmaster of Sir William Turner's School, Coatham	
Daniel Lewis Lloyd	1862	1867	BA Literae Humaniores (2nd) (1867), MA (1871)	Headmaster of Dolgelley Grammar School, Friars School, Bangor and Christ College, Brecon; later Bishop of Bangor	
Edward Owen	1746	1752	BA (1749), MA (1752)	Welsh priest and translator, who was headmaster of the grammar school in Warrington	
Owen Owen	1873	1877	BA Literae Humaniores (3rd)	Headmaster in Oswestry who became the first Chief Inspector of the Central Welsh Board for Intermediate Education	
Morgan Phillips	?	1911	?	Headmaster of Ruthin School (1930–1935)	
Owen Price	1649	—	—	Graduated from Christ Church, Oxford; Master of Magdalen College School, Oxford and writer of educational books	
Ernest Salter Davies	1891	1895	BA Literae Humaniores	Director of Education for Kent for 20 years and writer on educational matters	
Thomas Thomas	1824	1827	BA	Welsh cleric ("Thomas of Caernarfon") who helped to found schools in Caernarfon; the father of Llewellyn Thomas	
James Vincent	1735	1739	BA	Welsh cleric and schoolteacher, who was Master of the Friars School, Bangor; grandfather of James Vincent, who also attended the college	
Charles Williams (F/P)	1823	1827	BA Literae Humaniores (1st)	Headmaster of Ruthin School (1831–1839), Principal (1857–1877)	
John Williams (F)	1777	1783	BA (1781), MA	Cleric in north Wales and master of the Free school in Llanrwst (1790–1812)	
Peter Bailey Williams	1785	—	—	Cleric in north Wales whose Sunday school in Llanrug was the first in the county; graduated from Christ Church in 1790	
Robert Dewi Williams	?	?	BA	Headmaster of Clynnog Fawr School, which moved to become Clwyd College, Rhyl; a Presbyterian minister and writer	

=== Artists and writers ===
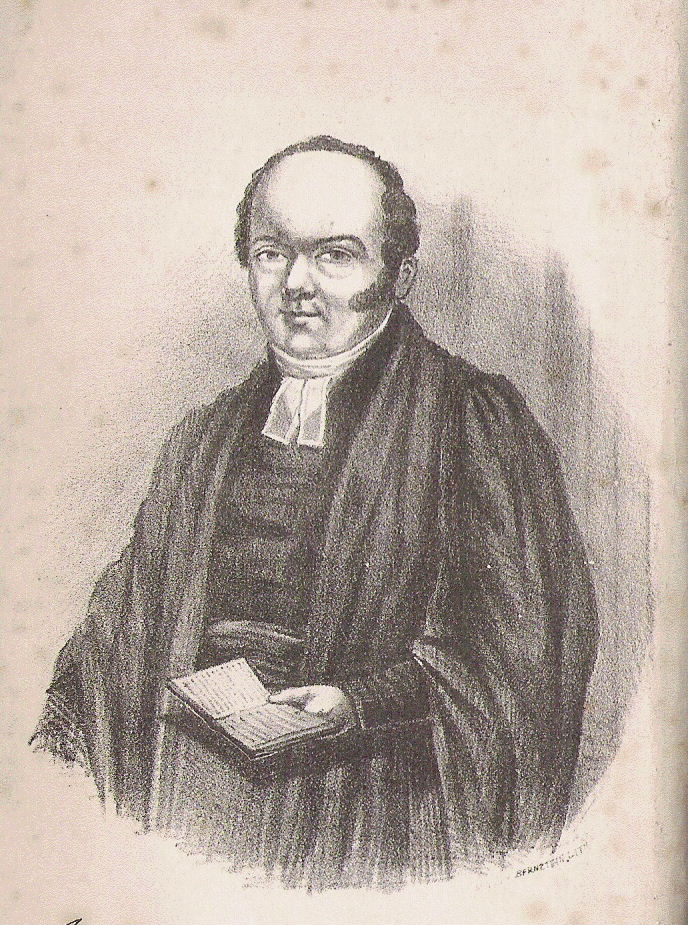
John Blackwell

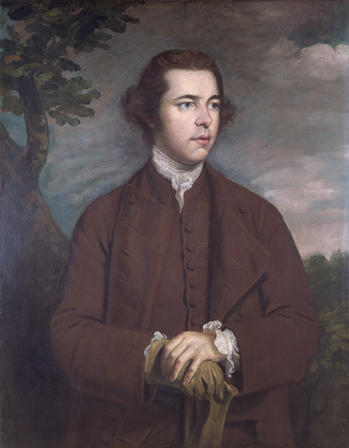
Thomas Jones

Name	M	G	Degree	Notes	Ref.
Tom Becker	1998	?	BA Modern History	Won the 2007 Waterstone's Children's Book Prize for his first novel, Darkside	
John Blackwell	1824	1828	BA	Welsh poet and writer, using the bardic name Alun	
William Boyd (HF)	1975	1978	DPhil	Novelist and screenwriter; left college accommodation and started work in 1978 when grant ran out, and has said "I never really left Jesus – I sort of drifted away."	
Alan Brien	1943	1950	BA English Literature (2nd)	Journalist and critic, author of Lenin; whilst at college, produced a film (Our College) commissioned by the Jesus College Record as a gesture of thanks to an American university that had sent a food parcel	
William Lucas Collins	1833	1840	BA Literae Humaniores (2nd, 1838), MA (1840)	Clergyman and contributor to Blackwood's Magazine	
John Davies	1641	DNG	—	Moved to St John's College, Cambridge during the English Civil War; a translator of works in French, Spanish and Latin who also wrote an account of the Civil War	
James Davis	1723	1732	BA (1726), MA (1729), BM (1732)	Physician and satirist	
David Ellis	1794	DNG	—	Welsh clergyman, poet and transcriber of manuscripts, who was at the college from March to June 1794	
Daniel Evans (F)	1810	1817	BA Literae Humaniores (3rd, 1814), MA (1817), BD (1824)	Welsh poet, known as Daniel Ddu o Geredigion	
John Evans	1789	1792	BA	Wrote four works about the topography of Wales	
Thomas Floyd	–	1599	MA (1596), BCL (1599)	Matriculated (1589) and BA (1593) from New Inn Hall, Oxford before moving to Jesus College; author of The picture of a perfit common wealth, describing as well the offices of princes and inferior magistrates over their subjects, as also the duties of subjects towards their governors (1600)	
Gwyneth Glyn	1999	2002	BA Philosophy and Theology (1st)	Singer and poet, Welsh Children's Bard (2006–2007)	
Sylvester Houédard	1941	1949	?	Studies interrupted by war service; a Benedictine monk and poet (known as "dom silvester houédard" or "dsh")	
James Howell	1610	1613	BA	Writer (notably of Dodona's Grove)	
Philip Hubbard	1929	1933	BA Literae Humaniores (2nd)	Author of 16 novels and two books for children; winner of the Newdigate Prize for English verse (1933)	
Edward Hughes	1794	1800	BA (1797), MA (1800)	Welsh poet (bardic name Y Dryw), who won prizes at the Denbigh Eisteddfodau of 1819 and 1828	
Thomas Rowland Hughes	1928	1931	BLitt	Welsh novelist, whose thesis was entitled "The London Magazine from 1820 to 1829"	
John Jenkins	1905	1908	BA Theology (2nd) (1908), DLitt (1932)	Welsh poet (bardic name Gwili) and theologian; Archdruid of the National Eisteddfod of Wales (1932–1936)	
Brian John	1959	1965	BA Geography (2nd, 1962), DPhil	Author of the historical-fiction series Angel Mountain Saga, whose DPhil was on the Ice Age in Wales	
Thomas Jones	1759	DNG	—	Left in 1761 to become a painter on the death of his uncle, at whose instigation he was studying for ordination	
Tobias Jones	1992	1995	BA Modern History and English (1st)	Author (of The Dark Heart of Italy) and journalist	
David Lewis	1698	1702	BA	Poet, whose collections of poetry also included works by Alexander Pope and John Dyer	
Evan Lloyd	1751	1757	BA (1754), MA (1757)	Satirical poet, whose works led to his imprisonment and hampered his career in the church	
Owen Martell	1998	1999	Meyricke Graduate Scholarship	Welsh author, translator, musician. Recipient of the . Winner 2001 Welsh Book of the Year Award for Cadw dy ffydd, brawd, (Strong and Prophetic; Gomer, 2000). Second novel, Dyn yr Eiliad (The Other Man; Gomer, 2003), short-listed in 2004. Dolenni Hud (Welsh Knot; Gomer, 2008) short stories in collaboration with photographer Simon Proffitt (another Jesus Alumnus). Translated Martin Crimp's Attempts on Her Life, (produced Sherman Cymru theatre, Cardiff, 2009). Third novel Intermission (Heinemann, 2013), written in English (has been translated into French, German and Spanish). He was co-editor of the Welsh-language review of books, O’r Pedwar Gwynt.	
Roland Mathias	1933	1939	BA Modern History (1st, 1936), BLitt	Welsh poet, short story writer and editor of The Anglo-Welsh Review (1961–1976), whose BLitt thesis was entitled "The Economic Policy of the Board of Trade 1696–1714"	
Dom Moraes	1956	1959	BA English (3rd)	Indian writer, poet and columnist	
John Morgan	1704	1708	BA	Clergyman and poet (who was known as John Morgan Matchin after his appointment to a position in Matching, Essex) and author of Myfyrdodau bucheddol ar y pedwar peth diweddaf ('Devout musings on the four last things') (1714)	
Sir Lewis Morris (HF)	1851	1856	BA Literae Humaniores (1st)	Anglo-Welsh poet, who was the first student to obtain 1st in Classics in both Mods and Finals for 30 years	
Arthur Nortje	1965	1967	BA English	South African poet, who returned to the college to study for a BPhil but died in 1970 before completing the course	
Goronwy Owen	1742	DNG	—	Welsh poet who was hardly resident at the college	`
Philip Palmer	1979	?	BA English	British science fiction writer	
Henry Perry	–	1583	MA (1583), BTh (1597)	Initially a member of Balliol College; a Welsh priest and writer	
Edward Pierce	1650	1657	BA (1655), MA (1657)	Welsh clergyman and satirist	
Angharad Price	1990	?	BA, DPhil (Modern Languages)	Prize-winning Welsh novelist and lecturer at Bangor University	
Rhys Prichard	1597	1602	BA	Welsh poet and clergyman, known as Yr Hen Ficer ("The Old Vicar"), and author of Canwyll y Cymry ("The Welshmen's Candle")	
William Rees	1889	1892	BA Literae Humaniores (2nd)	Welsh priest and writer	
David Richards	1774	DNG	—	Welsh poet (bardic name Dafydd Ionawr) and schoolmaster, who only spent one term at the college	
Thomas Richards	1708	1711	BA	Canon of St Asaph's Cathedral, who was also a writer and satirist	
John Roberts	1792	1796	BA	Welsh cleric and writer	
Erasmus Saunders	1690	1696	BA (1693), MA (1696), BD (1705), DD (1712)	Welsh priest and writer	
Francesca Simon	1977	?	BA Old English Language and Literature	American author of the Horrid Henry series of books	
Charles Symmons	—	1794	DD	Welsh priest and writer; a graduate of the University of Cambridge who was incorporated at Oxford in order to take his DD after being involved in controversy at Cambridge	
Gwyn Thomas	1959	1966	DPhil	Welsh poet, appointed National Poet of Wales in 2006	
Nathaniel Thomas	1747	?	BA	Welsh writer; editor and proprietor of the St James's Chronicle in London, and editor of Robert Ainsworth's Latin Dictionary	
Len Tyler	1971	?	BA Geography	Crime writer	
Henry Vaughan	1641?	DNG	—	Welsh poet and doctor; college records unclear on entry date	
Thomas Vaughan	1638	1646/7	BA (1642), graduate scholar until 1646/1647	Welsh clergyman, poet and writer	
William Vaughan	1592	1605	BA (1595), MA (1597), BCL (1600), DCL	Welsh writer and colonial investor	
John Walters	1777	1781	BA	Welsh clergyman and poet	
Hugh Williams	1740	1744	BA	Welsh clergyman and writer	
Morris Williams	1832	1835	BA Literae Humaniores (2nd)	Welsh writer (bardic name Nicander) and clergyman	
Nathaniel Williams	1672	1676	BA	Welsh writer whose works include A Pindaric Elegy on the famous Physician Dr. Willis	
William Wynn	1727	1735	BA (1730), MA (1735)	Welsh cleric and poet	
Ellis Wynne	1692	?	BA, possibly MA too, possibly in Law	Welsh clergyman and writer, particularly remembered for Gweledigaetheu y Bardd Cwsc ("Visions of the Sleeping Bard")	
Edwin Yoder (HF)	1956	1958	BA PPE (2nd)	American Rhodes Scholar, winner of the Pulitzer Prize for Editorial Writing (1979)	

=== Broadcasters and entertainers ===
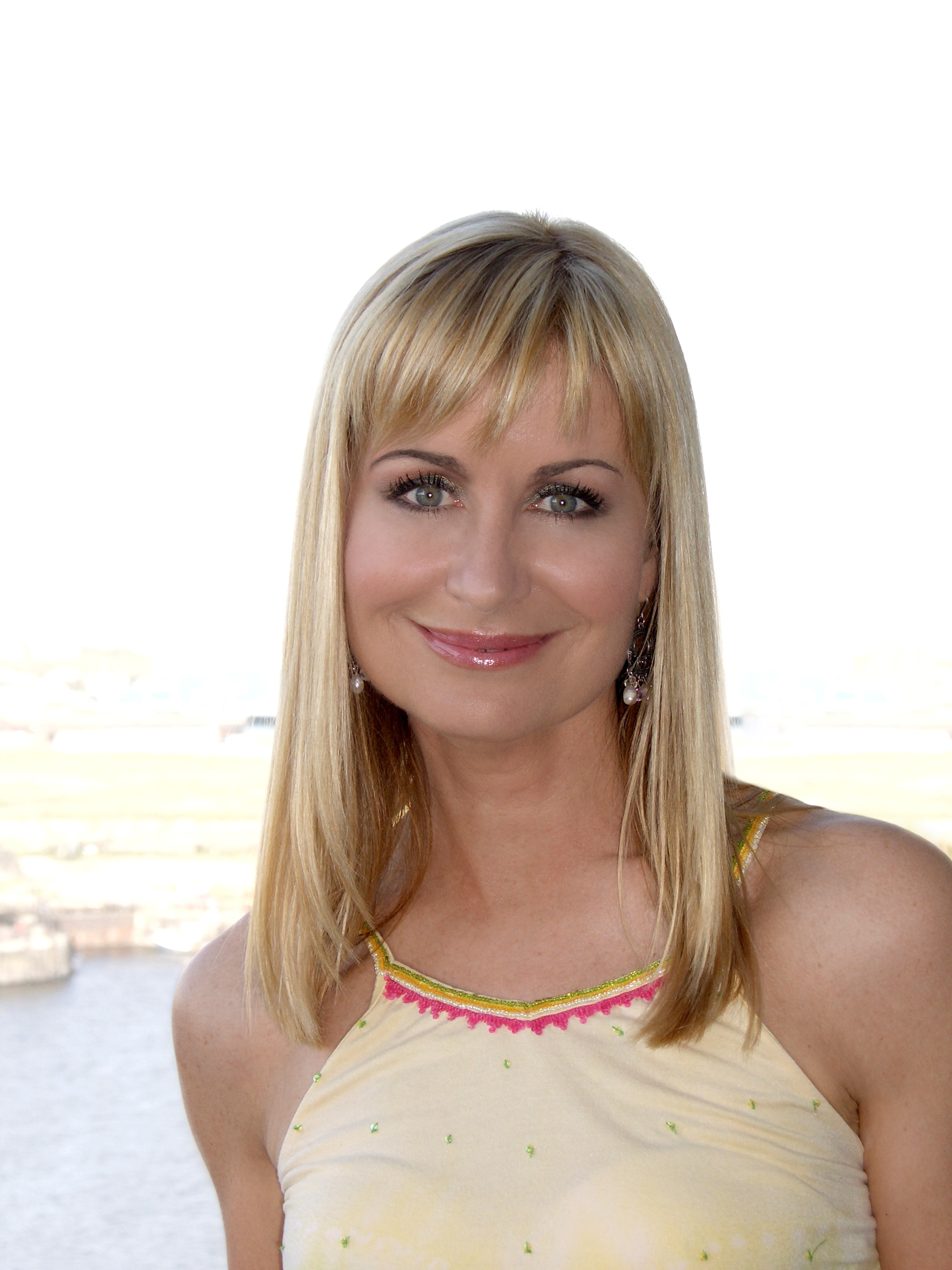
Siân Lloyd

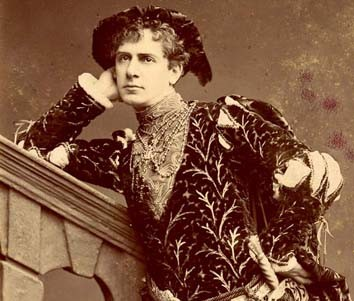
William Terriss

Name	M	G	Degree	Notes	Ref.
Elwyn Brook-Jones	?	?	?	West End, film and TV actor, whose roles included "The Voice" (the hero's opponent) in the children's TV series Garry Halliday	
Greg Childs	1973	1976	MA English	Children's television producer and advocate	
Douglas Cleverdon	1922	1926	BA Literae Humaniores (3rd)	Radio producer and bookseller	
Ronald Frame	1975	1979	B Litt	Scottish author	
Ian Gillies	1946	1949	BA Modern History (2nd)	Quiz question-setter, who was "Mycroft" on BBC Radio 4's Brain of Britain	
Arturo Goetz	1971	DNG	—	Argentinian actor who studied for a DPhil in Economics, but his scholarship finished before his thesis was complete	
Siân Lloyd	?	DNG	—	ITV national weather forecaster who left after 1 year of a BLitt in Celtic Studies	
Magnus Magnusson (HF)	1948	1951	BA English (2nd)	Television presenter (including Mastermind) and writer	
Inder Manocha	?	1980s (late)	BA Modern History	Comedian and actor	
Glyn Mathias	?	?	BA	Political Editor of Independent Television News (1981–1986) and BBC Wales (1994–1999); the Electoral Commission's Commissioner for Wales (2001–2008)	
Norman Matthews	1922	1926	BA Theology (2nd)	Chancellor of Llandaff Cathedral (1952–1964) and one of the panellists on the BBC show "The Brains Trust"	
Kirsty McCabe	?	?	postgraduate work on climate change	BBC national weather forecaster on radio and television	
Andre Ptaszynski	1972	1975	BA English	Television and theatre producer, and Chief Executive of the Really Useful Group	
Francine Stock (HF)	1976	1980	BA Modern Languages	Journalist and broadcaster; the college's first female honorary fellow	
William Terriss	?	DNG	—	Actor, known for his swashbuckling roles, who was murdered outside the Adelphi Theatre in 1897 by an unstable and struggling actor	
Jim Waterson	2008	2011	BA History	Journalist; Deputy Editor of Buzzfeed	
John Wood	1950	1953	BA Jurisprudence (3rd)	Actor, member of the Royal Shakespeare Company and Tony Award winner in 1976	

=== Musicians ===
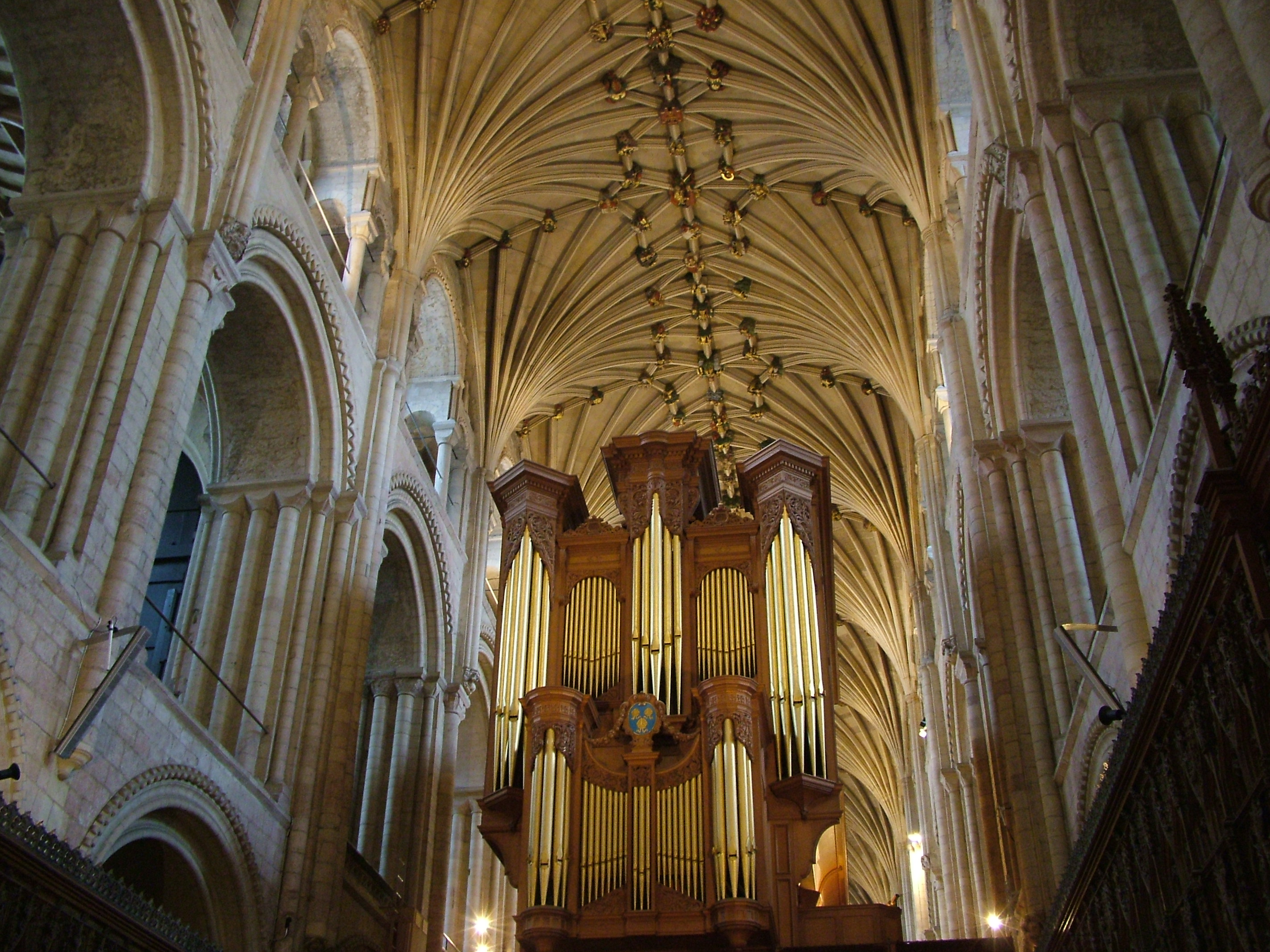
Norwich Cathedral, where Michael Nicholas was organist and master of choristers for 23 years

Musicians educated at the college
Name	M	G	Degree	Notes	Ref.
John Edwards	1825	1830	BA	Welsh cleric and hymn-tune composer, most notably of Rhosymedre (named after his parish)	
David Evans	?	1731	BA (1728), MA (1731)	Welsh priest, scholar and musician	
Thomas Fielden	1905	?	BA Music, BMus	College organ exhibitioner; Professor of Pianoforte at the Royal College of Music (1921–52)	
David Ffrangcon-Davies	1876	1881	BA	Baritone singer who needed several attempts to pass his exams	
Paul Jones	?	DNG	—	Singer with Manfred Mann	
Michael Nicholas	1957	1960	BA Music (2nd)	Organ scholar at college; organist and master of the choristers at Norwich Cathedral (1971–94); Chief Executive of the Royal College of Organists (1994–97)	
William Reed	1929	1934	BA Literae Humaniores (2nd, 1933), Diploma in Education (1934), DMus (1939)	English composer who studied with Herbert Howells	
Alan Rowlands	?	?	BA Chemistry	Pianist specialising in the work of John Ireland	
Denis Stevens	1940	1949	BA Music	A musicologist (with a particular interest in Monteverdi); editor of Grove Dictionary of Music and Musicians (1959–63) and Professor of Music at Columbia University (1964–76); studied languages (1940–42) then music after his war service (1942–46)	
Blanc Wan	2012	2013	MSt Music Performance	A pianist and acclaimed writer; chief editor of The Pianist magazine; studied at Oxford then research on Russian Piano School in London; Professor of Piano at Goldsmiths, University of London.	

=== Sports people ===
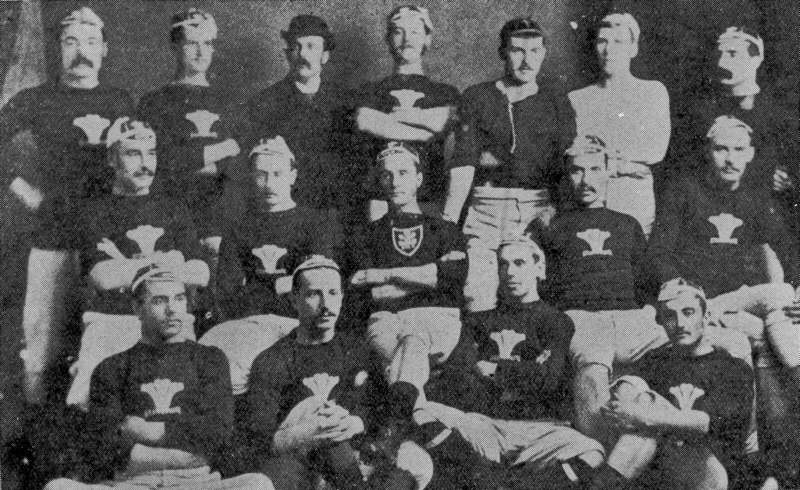
The Wales team for the first Welsh international rugby match in 1881, with Aneurin Rees seated on the far left of the middle row

Name	M	G	Degree	Notes	Ref.
Tony Ambrose	1951	1954	BA Natural Science (Engineering, 4th)	British rally driver who was given a red MG sports car by his father for winning a scholarship to the college	
Ranjit Bhatia	1957	1959	BA Mathematics (3rd)	Indian athlete who competed in the 1960 Summer Olympics (marathon and 5000 metres)	
Trevor Brewer	1948	1952	BA Chemistry (2nd)	Welsh rugby union international, winning three caps (1950–1955); rugby "Blue" in 1951	
Bailey Davies	1905	1908	BA Mathematics (3rd)	Welsh rugby union international, winning one cap (1907); rugby "Blue" three times (1905–1907)	
Jenkin Alban Davies	?	1909	BA Theology (3rd)	Welsh rugby union international, winning seven caps (1913–1914); did not win a "Blue"	
Sir David William Evans	1885	1888	?	Welsh rugby union international, winning five caps (1899–1891); rugby "Blue" twice (1887 and 1888); later became a solicitor and was knighted for public services to Wales	
Walter Rice Evans	1887	?	?	Welsh rugby union international, winning three caps (1890–1891); rugby "Blue" in 1890	
William Frederick Evans	1876	1883	BA Theology (3rd, 1880), MA (1883)	Welsh rugby union international, winning two caps (1882 and 1883); did not win a "Blue"	
Arthur Evanson	1880	1884	BA (1884), MA (1887)	English rugby union international, winning four caps (1882–1884); the college's first rugby "Blue" (twice, 1880 and 1881), and its only English rugby international	
Gwyn Francis	1919	1921	BA French	Welsh rugby union international, winning two caps (1919 and 1924); rugby "Blue" in 1919, and part of the college team (along with William Havard) that won the inter-college cup in 1920	
William Havard	1919	1921	BA Modern History	College chaplain (1919–1921) who won his 'Blue' for rugby and represented Wales against New Zealand Services in 1919 (his only international) before becoming Bishop of St Asaph (1934–1950) and Bishop of St David's (1950–1956)	
Vivian Jenkins	1930	1933	BA Literae Humaniores	Welsh rugby union international, winning fourteen caps (1933–1939) and one for the British and Irish Lions, who was the first Welsh full-back to score a try in an international match; rugby "Blue" three times (1930–1932); also played cricket for Glamorgan	
Kenyon Jones	1930	1933	BA Modern History (2nd)	Welsh rugby union international, winning one cap (1934); rugby "Blue" twice (1931 and 1932)	
Thomas Babington Jones	1871	1875	BA Mathematics (4th)	Played first-class cricket for Oxford University CC; cricket "Blue" in 1874	
Charles Lewis	1872	1879	BA (1876), MA (1879)	Welsh rugby union international, winning five caps (1882–1884); a triple "Blue" (cricket, hammer and hurdles, but not rugby)	
Hilary Lister	1991	1996	BA Biochemistry	Quadriplegic solo sailor – the first quadriplegic sailor to cross the English Channel	
James Page	1919	1923	BA Literae Humaniores (3rd, 1922), BA Jurisprudence (4th, 1923)	President of the Jesus College Jesus College Record and Captain of Boats whilst at college; rowing coach and secretary of the Amateur Rowing Association (1952–1972)	
Conway Rees	1891	1894	BA Modern History (3rd)	Welsh rugby union international, winning three caps (1892–1894); rugby "Blue" three times (1891–1893) and the first Welshman to captain Oxford University RFC	
Aneurin Rees	1877	DNG	—	Welsh rugby union international, winning one cap in the first international match involving Wales (1881); did not win a "Blue"	
George Robinson	1879	1883	BA Theology (3rd)	Played first-class cricket for Oxford University CC; cricket "Blue" three times (1881–1883)	
John Strand-Jones	1898	1901	?	Welsh rugby union international, winning five caps (1902–1903); rugby "Blue" three times (1899–1901)	
Barney Williams	2004	2006	Diploma in Legal Studies; MSc Management Studies	Canadian rower (winning a gold medal at the 2003 World Championships and a silver medal at the 2004 Summer Olympics) who was part of the winning crew for the Oxford-Cambridge Boat Race in 2005 and 2006	

=== Other people in public life ===
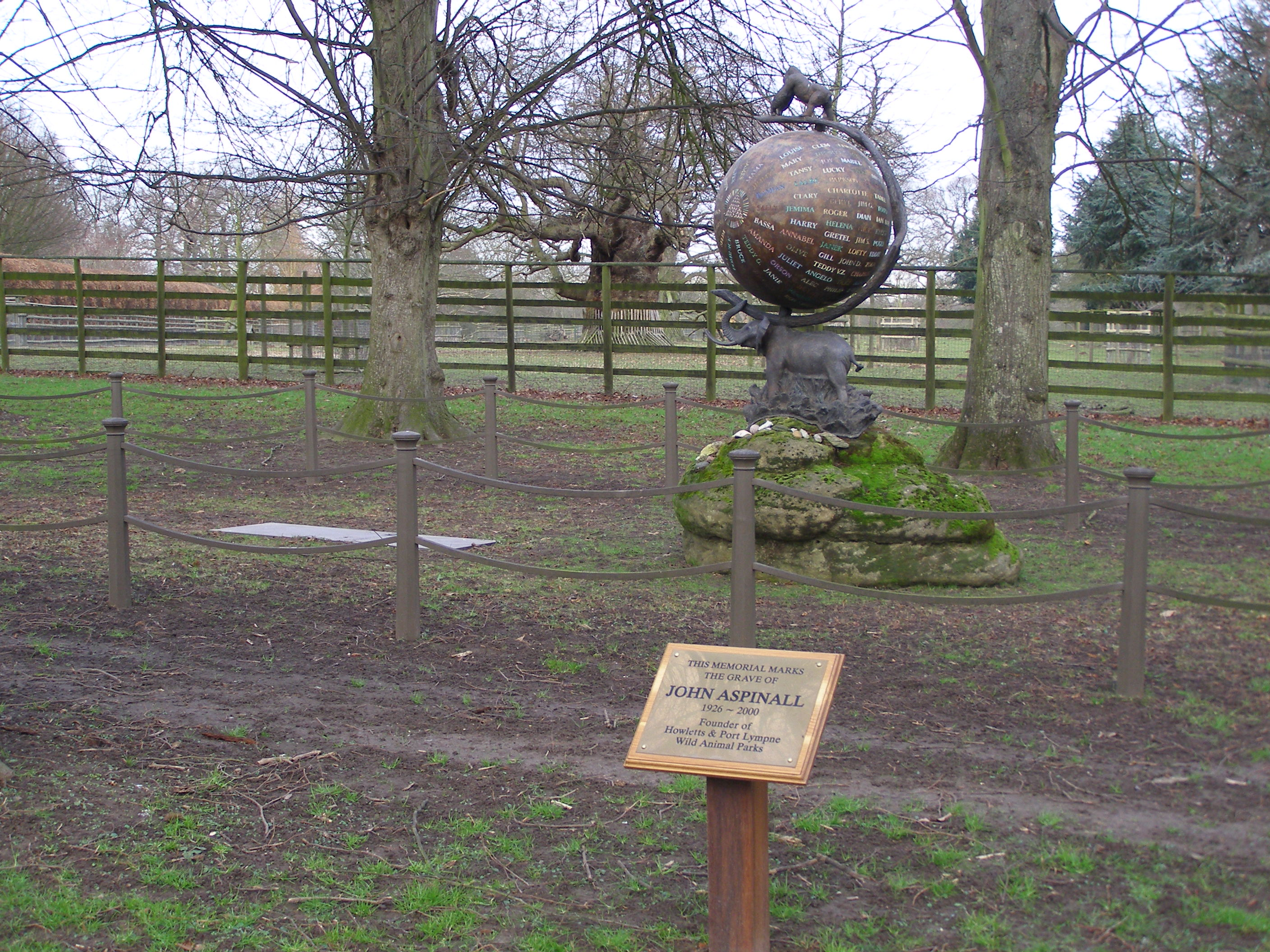
John Aspinall's grave and memorial at Howletts Wild Animal Park

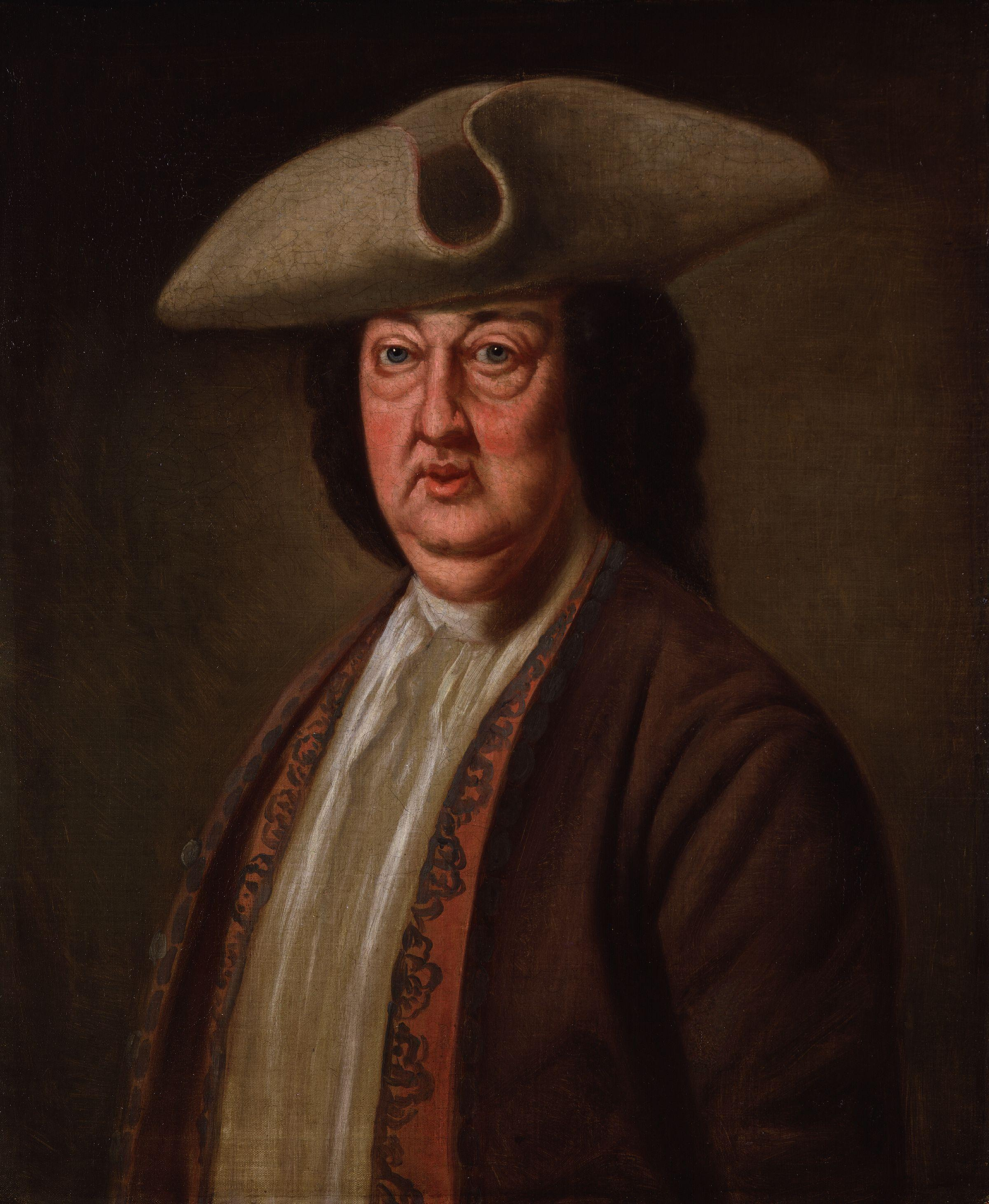
Beau Nash

Name	M	G	Degree	Notes	Ref.
John Aspinall	1947	DNG	—	Zoo owner (Howletts Zoo and Port Lympne Zoo) and gambler, who boasted of never attending a lecture whilst at Oxford, and who missed his final examinations to go to the races at Ascot	
Sir John Carter (HF)	1958	1961	BA Mathematics (2nd)	Chief Executive of Commercial Union (1994–1998) and Chairman of the National House Building Council since 2002	
Sir Geoffrey Cass (HF)	1951	1954	BA PPE (2nd)	Chief Executive of Cambridge University Press (1972–1992) and Chairman of the Royal Shakespeare Company (1985–2000)	
Geraint Talfan Davies	1963	1966	BA Modern History	Chair of Welsh National Opera, formerly Controller of BBC Wales and Chair of the Arts Council of Wales	
Rajeeb Dey	2004	2008	BA Economics and Management	Businessman who won the "02 X Young Entrepreneur of the Year" award in 2009	
Ffion Hague	1986	1989	BA English	Writer and wife of former Conservative Party leader William Hague	
Sir Bernard Miller (HF)	1923	1927	BA Modern History (1st)	Chairman of the John Lewis Partnership (1955–1972)	
Alec Monk (HF)	1962	1965	BA PPE (2nd)	Chairman and Chief Executive of Gateway (1981–1989) and Chairman of Charles Wells (1998–2003)	
Beau Nash	1692	DNG	—	A dandy and social celebrity who was allegedly dismissed from the university for an "intrigue" with a local woman, although college records have no evidence that he was sent down	
Roger Parry	1976	?	MLitt	Media entrepreneur and Chairman of YouGov	
Sir Owen Roberts (HF)	1854	1858	BA Literae Humaniores (3rd)	Clerk to the Clothworkers' Company (1866–1907, Master 1909); prime mover in setting up the City and Guilds of London Institute and chairman of the London Polytechnic Council	
Crispian Strachan	1968	1971	BA Jurisprudence	Chief Constable of Northumbria Police (1998–2005)	
John Wynne	1688	DNG	—	Industrialist and philanthropist	

== Fictional students of Jesus College ==
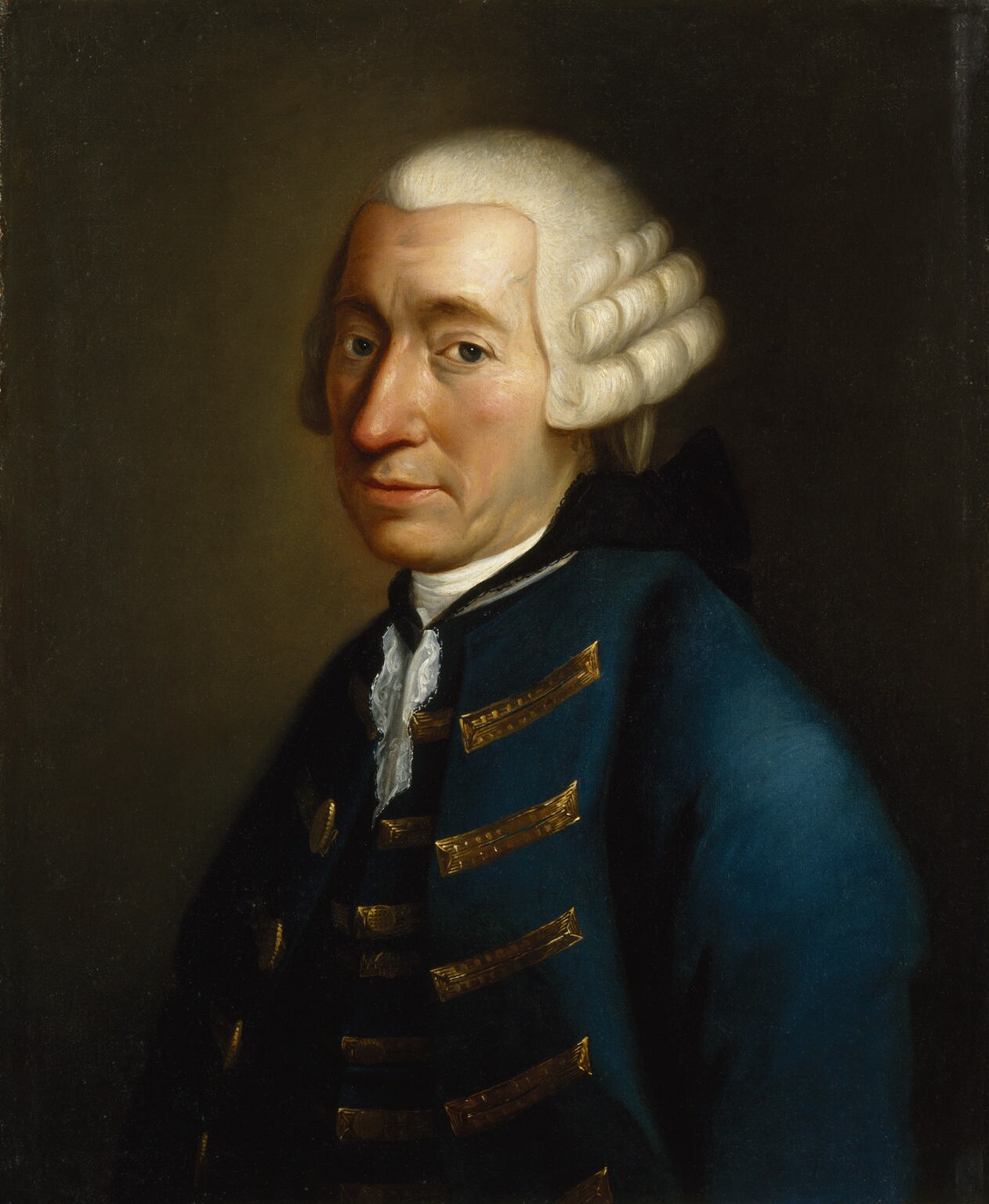
Tobias Smollett, author of The Expedition of Humphry Clinker

Students at the college in fiction
Character	Author	Notes	Ref.
Sir David Metcalfe QC	Jeffrey Archer	A character in the play Beyond Reasonable Doubt	
Ruth Gilmartin	William Boyd	A principal character in Restless, who in Chapter 4 calls at her college in Turl Street; the novel is set in 1976, when Jesus College was the only Turl Street college admitting women; Boyd has also said "When, in my fiction, I have had to place a character at an Oxford college it has always been Jesus – sometimes disguised (as in my novel An Ice-Cream War) sometimes overtly identified (as in my novel Any Human Heart)"	
Logan Mountstuart	William Boyd	A character in the novel Any Human Heart, who studies History at Jesus College in the 1920s and is awarded a third-class degree	
Cedric Downes	Colin Dexter	A Fellow of Brasenose in the novel The Jewel That Was Ours, who reveals that he was an undergraduate at Jesus, which he describes as "one of the less fashionable colleges"	
Sir Watkin Phillips, Bt. and others	Tobias Smollett	Phillips is mentioned in The Expedition of Humphry Clinker (1771), an epistolary novel, as the recipient of letters from another Jesus College man, Jery Melford. There is no evidence that Phillips or Melford were based on real people, but other Jesus College men in Melford's letters (Griffy Price, Gwyn, Mansel, Basset and "our old friend Barton") may be based on individuals attending Jesus College in the 1720s and 1730s.	
Mark Treasure	David Williams	A detective in various novels by Williams; his Jesus College tie is recognised by a Welsh parson in Divided Treasure	
