= Hilary Lister =

British sailor

- Hilary Lister, in 2009

Personal information
- Full name: Hilary Claire Lister
- Nationality: British
- Born: 3 March 1972 Hook, Hampshire
- Died: 18 August 2018 (aged 46)

Sailing career
- Sport: Sailing
- College team: Jesus College, Oxford
- Club: The Royal Cruising Club
- Class: Class 40

Hilary Claire Lister (3 March 1972 – 18 August 2018) was an English record-breaking quadriplegic sailor. She had the progressive condition reflex sympathetic dystrophy and controlled her ship by using sip-and-puff technology for steering and sails.

Lister was born in Hook in Hampshire, as the third of four children born to biochemist mother Pauline and vicar father Colin. Lister was able-bodied until the age of 15. She studied biochemistry at Jesus College, Oxford, between 1991 and 1995, having lost the use of her legs by then. She started a PhD at the University of Kent in 1996 but her condition deteriorated. She lost the use of her arms in 1999 and was unable to finish her doctorate, but was awarded an honorary doctorate by the university. She was introduced to sailing in 2003, which she commented gave her back her sense of freedom and "quite literally" saved her life. Lister married music teacher Clifford in 1999, though they later separated.

On 23 August 2005, Lister was the first quadriplegic to sail solo across the English Channel (in 6 hours and 13 minutes). On 24 July 2007, she became the first female quadriplegic to sail solo around the Isle of Wight (in 11 hours 4 minutes). She won the Sunday Times Helen Rollason Award for Inspiration in 2005. She set off to sail solo around Great Britain on 16 June 2008. Bad weather and technical problems forced her to suspend the attempt on 13 August 2008.

On 21 May 2009, Hilary Lister resumed her attempt from Plymouth. By 14 August she had reached Bridlington, Yorkshire on the east coast. She reached the end of her journey, Dover in Kent, on the evening of 31 August 2009, becoming the first disabled woman to sail solo around Britain. Lister had to be resuscitated six times during her circumnavigation of Britain.

On 8 January 2010, at the Tullett Prebon London International Boat Show, Lister announced her intention to compete in the 2011 Fastnet Race in a Class 40 boat. In April 2010, Hilary sailed around the Kingdom of Bahrain in support of Bahrain Mobility International.

Lister died on 18 August 2018. She was 46.

== Awards ==
- Winner of The Royal Cruising Club's Seamanship Award, 2005
- Winner of A Woman of the Year 2005–2006 — Women of the Year Charity
- Winner of Woman of the Year 2006 — New Woman Magazine
- Winner of the Helen Rollason Award for Inspiration — Sunday Times Sportswomen of the Year 2007
- Winner of the Cosmopolitan Superhero Award — Cosmopolitan Fun & Fearless Women
- Winner of Breast cancer Breakthrough Aspirational non-celebrity, 2009
- Winner of the Vitalise "Woman of Achievement" Award, 2009
- Winner of the SJA Bill McGowan Award, 2009

== Other recognition ==
- Made a UK Sailing Academy Ambassador 2006
- Awarded an honorary PhD by the University of Kent at Canterbury 2007
- Hilary is patron of Mariners of Bewl and the Active Ashford Bursary.
- Kent County Council Invicta Award, April 2010
