= Glen O'Hara =

British academic historian (born 1974)

Glen O'Hara (born 1974) is an academic historian, who also writes on politics for a number of publications in the United Kingdom. He is professor of modern and contemporary history at Oxford Brookes University.

== Career ==
O'Hara completed an undergraduate degree in history at Oxford University between 1993 and 1996, before completing a M.Sc. in Economic and Social History in 1996–1997, during which time he won the Eubule Thelwall Prize for history and the Gladstone Prize for history and politics. Following graduation he briefly worked as a schoolteacher. From 1999 he studied for a PhD in history at University College London under the supervision of Professor Kathleen Burk; he graduated in 2002. In 2001 he was appointed lecturer in economic history at the University of Bristol, where he spent a year before moving to New College, Oxford as lecturer in modern history. In 2005 he moved to become a lecturer at Oxford Brookes, and was promoted to senior lecturer a year later. He became reader in the history of public policy in 2010 and professor of modern and contemporary history in 2013.

== Political work ==
O'Hara writes on the subject of contemporary politics in the United Kingdom for The Guardian, The Independent, The New European and GQ magazine.

In 2019 he was an advisor to the short lived centrist political party Change UK. In a paper titled: 'What next for the Independent Group? Here's a winning manifesto', O'Hara argued for limited cuts to local government and more devolution coupled with greater focus on cooperative systems for managing public services, rather than full nationalisation. Alongside a 'Third Way' politics in the tradition of New Labour, O'Hara favoured a pro-EU position and the return of full living grants for poorer students to pursue academic study. The party was dissolved later that year after it failed to win seats in local elections, the 2019 United Kingdom general election or the 2019 EU Parliament elections.

== Books ==
- The Politics of Water in Post-War Britain (Basingstoke: Palgrave, 2017).
- Governing Post-War Britain: The Paradoxes of Progress (Basingstoke: Palgrave, 2012).
- Britain and the Sea since 1600 (Basingstoke: Palgrave, 2010).
- Statistics and the Public Sphere: Numbers and the People in Modern Britain, c. 1800—2000 (edited with Tom Crook, London and New York: Routledge, 2011)
- From Dreams to Disillusionment: Economic and Social Planning in 1960s Britain (Basingstoke: Palgrave, 2007)
