= Harold Littler =

Anglican priest and headmaster

Harold Davies Littler (1887 – 3 January 1948) was an Anglican priest and headmaster.

== Life ==
Littler was educated at Rossall School and Jesus College, Oxford, where he read Modern History and lived on Staircase III with Alwyn Williams (later Bishop of Durham) and "Lawrence of Arabia". He obtained a second-class degree, graduating in 1910, and was made a Fellow of the Royal Historical Society in the following year. After a year teaching at Pocklington School, he then was an assistant master at Liverpool College from 1911 to 1919 before becoming headmaster of Sir William Turner's School, Coatham in 1919. He remained there until 1941, before becoming a parish priest in Shipston-on-Stour, then moving to Warwick as vicar of St Mary's Church in 1945. His talents as an administrator and preacher led to his involvement with the Stratford Festival and as secretary of the appeal for the rebuilding of Coventry Cathedral. He was appointed an honorary canon of Coventry Cathedral in 1944, and became a Fellow of the Society of Antiquaries in 1946. He published School Sermons. He died on 3 January 1948 after an operation.
