= Morgan Hector Phillips =

Morgan Hector Phillips (14 March 1885 – 3 March 1953) was a Welsh headmaster and educationalist, who served as headmaster of Ruthin School from 1930 to 1935.

Phillips, who was the son of the rector of Radyr, Glamorgan, Wales, was born on 14 March 1885. He was educated at Christ College, Brecon and was then a classical scholar at Jesus College, Oxford (graduating in 1911). He was a teacher in East Grinstead, at University College School in London, and at Charterhouse. He served as an officer in the Royal Fusiliers (1914) and the Royal Army Service Corps (1915 to 1919). He was appointed as Rector of the Royal College, Mauritius and a member of the Colonial Civil Service in 1923, working also as head of the Secondary Education Department of the island. In 1930, he was appointed as headmaster of Ruthin School, Wales, resigning in 1935 apparently through ill-health. Thereafter, he moved to London and was a director of various companies. He died on 3 March 1953.
