= Rajeeb Dey =

British entrepreneur (born 1985)

- Born: 6 December 1985 (age 40)
- Education: Jesus College
- Occupation: entrepreneur

Rajeeb Dey MBE (born 6 December 1985) is a British entrepreneur. He was the winner of the O2 X Young Entrepreneur of the Year 2009 Award and has been referred to as "among the most high profile" young entrepreneurs by the Financial Times. In 2012, Rajeeb Dey was named the world's Youngest Young Global Leader in the 2012 cohort by the World Economic Forum.

== University life ==
Rajeeb graduated with First Class Honours in June 2008 from Jesus College, University of Oxford in Economics and Management. Whilst at university he was President of Oxford Entrepreneurs, the student society for entrepreneurs at the University of Oxford. He was also President of the University of Oxford India Society (then known as the Oxford Majlis Asian Society), founded in 1896 as a political forum for Indian independence and the second oldest society at Oxford University.

== English Secondary Students' Association ==
At 17, Rajeeb became the founder and chair of the English Secondary Students' Association (ESSA) – the first national student-run organisation empowering secondary school students, giving them a voice in education. He is often quoted in the media, including The Times Educational Supplement, New Statesman, The Guardian as well as BBC Radio 4, commenting on matters related to ESSA and student voice.

== Enternships.com ==
Dey is the founder and CEO of the now defunct website Enternships.com, a service providing "entrepreneurial work placements" by connecting students and graduates to start-ups, SMEs and intrapreneurial firms worldwide, for which Rajeeb received the O2 X Young Entrepreneur of the Year 2009. Rajeeb was profiled by the Institute of Directors as the Director of the Month in March 2010 and as one of the UK's Top 30 Entrepreneurs aged Under 30 in Real Business Magazine (April 2010).

Dey was appointed Member of the Order of the British Empire (MBE) in the 2016 Birthday Honours for services to entrepreneurship.

== Advisory roles ==
Rajeeb is an Ambassador for Enterprise UK; Trustee and Investment Committee member of UnLtd; Trustee of the Phoenix Education Trust; a Commissioner on the Carnegie UK Trust's Inquiry into the Future of Civil Society; Education Advisory Board Member for Channel 4; a Founding Advisory Board Member of the UK–India Business Council (UKIBC) Next Generation Network and member of the UK Trade & Investment Sub–Saharan Africa Taskforce chaired by Lord Stephen Green.

== See also ==
- Sherif Bishara
