= Percy Seymour =

Australian classical scholar

Percy Ambrose Seymour (1887–1954) was an Australian classicist and university administrator.

== Biography ==
Seymour was born in Australia in 1887 and educated at Ormond College (University of Melbourne), graduating in 1910 in classics. He then obtained a scholarship to study at Jesus College, Oxford and obtained a first-class degree in Literae Humaniores, then returned to Australia to lecture at Queensland University until 1921. He then returned to Oxford, becoming a Fellow of Jesus College in 1924 (a position he held until 1943). In addition to his teaching duties in ancient history, he also served as the college's bursar from 1930 to 1935, helping to strengthen the college's financial position in difficult financial conditions. Seymour then resigned his fellowship and become Vice-Master of Ormond College in 1949 (after teaching at the Royal Grammar School, High Wycombe for a while) and helped raise an endowment fund for the college. He died in Florence, in 1954.
