= Thomas Powel =

British academic

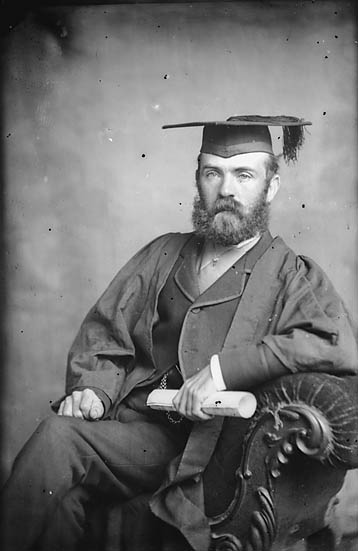
- Prof. Powel photographed by John Thomas
- Born: 1845
- Died: 1922
- Occupation: Professor of Celtic

Thomas Powel (1845 – 16 May 1922) was a Welsh Celtic scholar, who was Professor of Celtic at University College, Cardiff from 1884 to 1918.

== Biography ==
Powel was born in Llanwrtyd in 1845 and educated there and in Llandovery before matriculating at Jesus College, Oxford in 1869. He obtained a BA degree in Literae Humaniores in 1872.

He taught at the Independent College in Taunton from 1878 to 1880, when he was appointed headmaster of Bootle College, holding that position until 1883. He then became an assistant lecturer in classics at the new University College, Cardiff, then lecturer in Celtic. In the following year, 1884, he was appointed Professor of Celtic, continuing in this position until he retired in 1918. He edited (1879–1886) and contributed articles on linguistics and literature to the Welsh language journal Y Cymmrodor; he also edited medieval texts, including Thomas Stephens's version of Y Gododdin.

He helped Cardiff to obtain important manuscripts and books for the university and city libraries and was a member of the governing body of the National Library of Wales from its foundation. He said that he chose to give his time to his students rather than to his own research. The University of Wales awarded him an honorary D.Litt. degree in 1921. He died in Aberystwyth on 16 May 1922.
