= J. R. Cohu =

Jean Rougier Cohu (generally known as J. R. Cohu) (1858 – 1935) was an Anglican priest, school headmaster and author.

== Biography ==
Cohu was educated at Jesus College, Oxford, obtaining a first-class degree in Literae Humaniores in 1880. He was a Fellow of Jesus College from 1882 to 1890. He taught at Dulwich College as sixth-form master for a year, and was headmaster of Plymouth College for a time before becoming headmaster of Richmond, North Yorkshire Grammar School (1884 to 1890). He was appointed rector of Remenham in 1890, moving to Aston Clinton in 1904, a position he held until his retirement in 1930.

He published a number of books on biblical subjects, including Vital Problems of Religion (1914), described in his obituary as "a clear and attractive discussion of some of the great problems underlying spiritual experience in the light of the best available modern thought."

== Publications ==
- Through Evolution to the Living God (1912)
- The Bible and Modern Thought
- The Gospels in Light of Modern Research
- Saint Paul in Light of Modern Research
- The Old Testament in Light of Modern Research
- Oremus: Or, the Place of Prayer in Modern Religious Life
