= Owen Price (writer) =

Welsh schoolmaster and writer

Owen Price (died 25 November 1671) was a Welsh schoolmaster and writer.

== Life ==
Price was born in Montgomeryshire, Wales and studied at Jesus College, Oxford for four years. After returning to Wales to teach, he resumed his education at Oxford and obtained his Bachelor of Arts and Master of Arts degrees by 1656. He became master of Magdalen College School, Oxford in 1657, and was complaining in the following year about the delay in appointing him as master of Westminster School, saying that the delay was dissuading parents from sending their children to him for lessons. He was not appointed to Westminster School, and lost his position at Magdalen College School on the Restoration because of his non-conformist beliefs. He then taught in Devon and Oxfordshire, maintaining his good reputation as a teacher. He died in Oxford, near Magdalen College, on 25 November 1671.

== Works ==
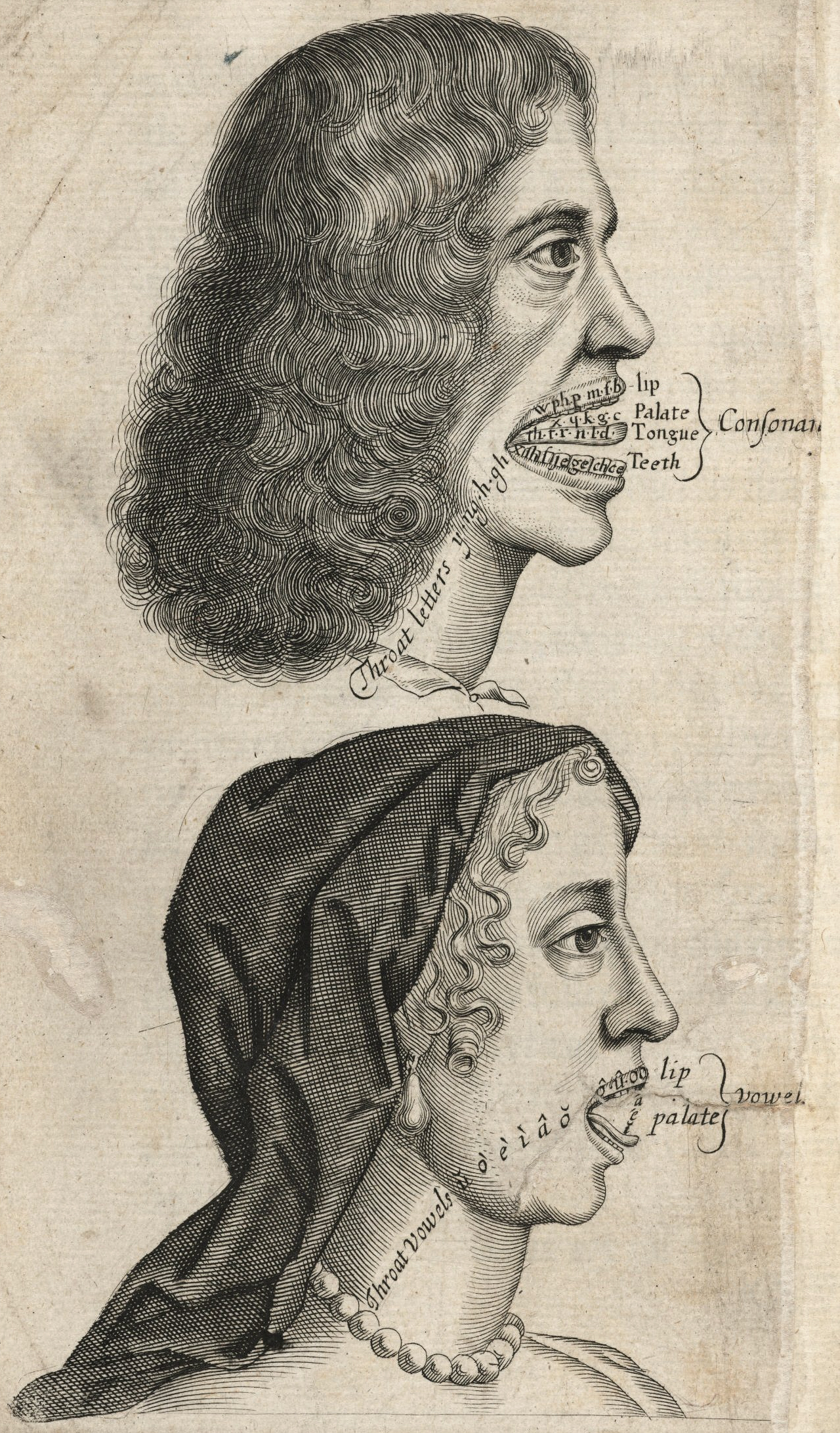
From The Vocal Organ, 1665

Price wrote The Vocal Organ (1665), containing the first illustrations in an English book of the parts of the body involved in speech. It taught punctuation and pronunciation, amongst other topics. English Orthography (1668) was a revised version of his first book, including rules of spelling set out in 'question and answer' format. A later edition, in 1670, added a list of words that were frequently misspelt, although his lists were not original.
