= John Evans (surgeon) =

Welsh surgeon and cartographer

John Evans (4 July 1756 – October 1846) was a Welsh surgeon and cartographer.

== Life ==
Evans was born on 4 July 1756 at Llwyn-y-groes, Llanymynech on the border between Montgomeryshire, Wales and Shropshire, England. His father was the map-maker John Evans. Evans (the son) was educated at Westminster School and the University of Oxford, where he matriculated in 1773 from Jesus College, Oxford. He obtained degrees of Bachelor of Arts (1778), Master of Arts (1779) and Bachelor of Divinity (1783) from St Alban Hall, Oxford, before obtaining the degree of Doctor of Medicine from the University of Edinburgh. He then lived in Shrewsbury before moving back to Llwyn-y-groes after his father's death in 1795.

His father's maps of North Wales were regarded as the best maps of the region before those of the Ordnance Survey on account of their appearance, size and accuracy of detail. Evans republished his father's maps in about 1799, receiving an award of 45 guineas from the Royal Society of Arts. He published a further edition of the maps in 1802 with some new roads included. His other interests included bees, and he wrote a didactic poem called The Bee. He was married to Jane Wilson, and they had five sons and four daughters. One of his sons was Robert Wilson Evans, who became Fellow and tutor of Trinity College, Cambridge and archdeacon of Westmorland, and it was at this son's house in Heversham that Evans died in October 1846 aged 90.
