= Clement Rogers =

English theologian

Clement Francis Rogers (1866 – 23 June 1949) was an English theologian, who was professor of pastoral theology at King's College London.

Rogers, the son of Professor James Rogers, was born in 1866 and educated at Westminster School and Jesus College, Oxford. He was ordained deacon in 1890 and priest in 1891, and became a lecturer at King's College London in 1906 having spent time working in parishes in Yorkshire and London. He became a professor in 1919, retiring in 1932 and becoming an emeritus professor. He served as Chaplain of King's College London from 1932-1936. His works included books based on his experiences talking about Christianity at Hyde Park and theological works.
