= Jim Mauldon =

British mathematician

James Grenfell Mauldon MC (1920 – 21 May 2002) was a British mathematician who taught at the University of Oxford and in the United States at Amherst College.

== Life ==
Mauldon was born in 1920 and educated at Ipswich School and Jesus College, Oxford, where he studied mathematics. Although he matriculated in 1938, he did not complete his studies until 1947 because of the intervention of the Second World War. He served with the Royal Tank Regiment between 1941 and 1946 in the North African and Italian campaigns, reaching the rank of major. He won the Military Cross for his actions at the First Battle of El Alamein in 1942, when he took fuel lorries to replenish tanks that had been left isolated by Rommel's movements. He commanded the tank assigned for the use of General Montgomery to follow the battle. He later said that it was he who introduced Montgomery to the beret that thereafter became his trademark, saying that if Montgomery wanted to move around without being recognised, he would have to wear a beret like the others in the crew; Montgomery then borrowed the driver's beret.

On his return to Oxford, he was elected to a Fellowship at Corpus Christi College, Oxford and was a Tutor in Mathematics from 1951 to 1968; he was also the college Dean. He then moved to Amherst College, Massachusetts, where he was Walker Professor until retiring in 1990. He was highly respected as a teacher at both Oxford and Amherst.

He published on a wide range of mathematical topics, including group theory, game theory, geometry, statistics and matrix properties. He also composed chess problems, setting the Christmas competition for The Sunday Times for a number of years.
