= Wilfred Hinton =

Wilfred John Hinton (7 November 1887 – 20 June 1949) was an economist and expert on international relations. He was a professor of the University of Hong Kong and thereafter was the Director of Studies for the Institute of Bankers from 1929 until his death.

== Life ==
Hinton was educated at Howard Gardens School in Cardiff, the University of Wales and Jesus College, Oxford. In 1912, he was appointed the registrar of the University of Hong Kong, remaining there until 1929 and becoming Professor of Political Economy, Dean and a member of the Court and Council. He was also acting Commercial Commissioner in Siberia, dealing with economic relief and currency reform, for a period in 1919. He was part of the British delegation to the Institute of Pacific Relations conferences in Honolulu and elsewhere, carrying out research thereafter for the Institute on the government and economy of Malaya. In 1929, Hinton was appointed Director of Studies for the Institute of Bankers, having developed a reputation as an economist and expert in international affairs of the Far East. He travelled frequently to the United States, lecturing at universities and receiving an honorary doctorate from the University of Maine in 1943. He was seconded to the Ministry of Information in 1940, and worked in New York from 1942 to 1945 as a director of the British Information Services. In 1945, he returned to the Institute of Bankers, directing an international summer school in Oxford in 1948 that was attended by individuals from 30 countries. He died on 20 June 1949.
