= Hugh Williams (priest) =

Welsh Anglican priest and writer

Hugh Williams (1721 or 1722–1779) was a Welsh Anglican priest and writer.

== Life ==
Williams, from Llanengan, on the Llŷn peninsula of north-west Wales, was christened on 18 January 1722. He attended the Friars School in Bangor before studying at Jesus College, Oxford between 1740 and 1744. After his ordination as a priest in the Church of England, he was made curate of Llanengan in 1745, leaving in 1751 to become rector of Llanfrothen and perpetual curate of Beddgelert. In 1754, he moved again to be rector of Aberffraw, a position he held until he died in 1779. He was a friend of the Welsh poet Goronwy Owen, a contemporary at both the Friars School and Jesus College. Williams himself was a poet, although very little of what he wrote has survived; he was also a respected preacher. He published a translation into Welsh of a sermon in English in 1773, and later wrote Rhannau Detholedig o'r Salmau Cân gyd a'r Ystyr o honynt o flaen pob Salm (1776).
