= List of clergy educated at Jesus College, Oxford =

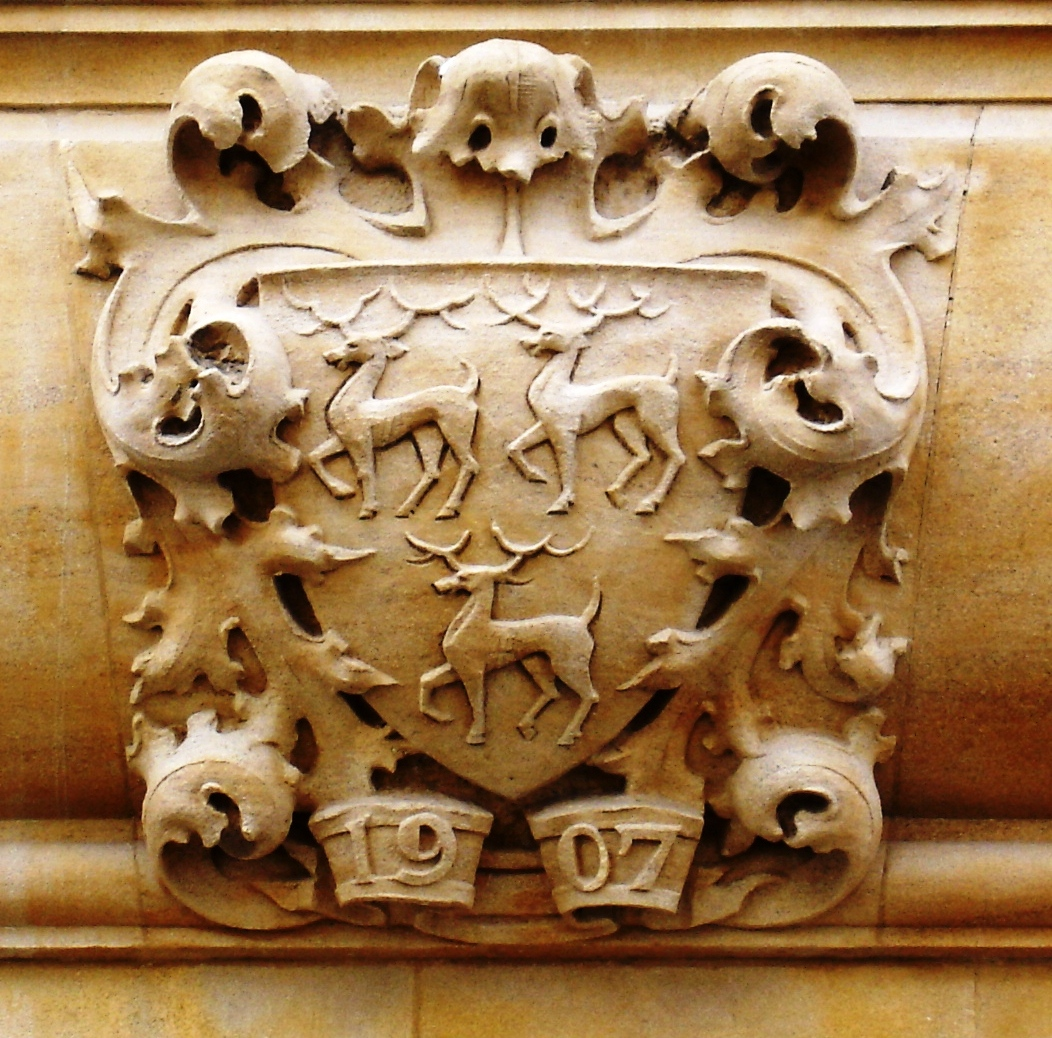
The crest of Jesus College above the entrance on Ship Street

Jesus College is one of the constituent colleges of the University of Oxford in England. The college was founded in 1571 by Queen Elizabeth I at the request of Hugh Price, a Welsh clergyman, who was Treasurer of St David's Cathedral in Pembrokeshire. The college still has strong links with Wales, and about 15% of students are Welsh. There are 340 undergraduates and 190 students carrying out postgraduate studies. Women have been admitted since 1974, when the college was one of the first five men's colleges to become co-educational. Old members of Jesus College are sometimes known as "Jesubites".

Three Archbishops of Wales have studied at Jesus College. A. G. Edwards, the first archbishop of the Church in Wales after its disestablishment, read Literae Humaniores from 1871 to 1874, and was archbishop from 1920 to 1934. Glyn Simon, a student from 1922 to 1926, was Archbishop of Wales from 1968 to 1971. He was succeeded by Gwilym Williams, who was archbishop from 1971 to 1982. Other bishops to have held office in Wales include Francis Davies, Roy Davies, John Harris and Morgan Owen (who were all Bishops of Llandaff), Humphrey Humphreys, Daniel Lewis Lloyd and Humphrey Lloyd (who were Bishops of Bangor), William Lloyd and John Wynne (who were Bishops of St Asaph), and John Owen and William Thomas (who were Bishops of St David's). William Havard was a Welsh rugby international before becoming Bishop of St Asaph, then Bishop of St David's.

Several former students have been appointed as cathedral deans; many others became parish priests in Wales and elsewhere in the Anglican church, some also finding time for other activities such as writing poetry or pursuing antiquarian interests. At least five have been Dean of Bangor: Henry Edwards, Henry James, Evan Lewis, John Pryce and James Vincent. Llewelyn Hughes was Dean of Ripon from 1951 to 1967, Alex Wedderspoon was Dean of Guildford from 1987 to 2001, and Wesley Carr was Dean of Westminster Abbey from 1997 to 2006. Edmund Meyrick, who studied at the college between 1656 and 1659, became Treasurer of St David's Cathedral; he left money in his will to the college to fund scholarships for Welsh students, which are still awarded. The lexicographer John Davies of Mallwyd, who translated the Bible into Welsh, studied at the college. In the mid-19th century, some Anglican priests were influenced by John Henry Newman and converted to Roman Catholicism, including David Lewis; Edmund Ffoulkes also converted, but later returned to Anglicanism, becoming vicar of the University Church of St Mary the Virgin in Oxford. John David Jenkins, who was Canon of Pietermaritzburg for a time, was later nicknamed the "Rail men's Apostle" for his ministry to railway workers in Oxford. David Thomas, a priest in Gwynedd, was instrumental in the foundation of a Welsh church in the Welsh settlement in Argentina.

Some students became ministers in other denominations of Christianity. Methodists include David Charles and Christopher Bassett; Baptists include Gwilym Davies (the first person to broadcast on the radio in Welsh, in 1923); Welsh Presbyterians include William David Davies and Gwilym Edwards; Unitarians include John Islan Jones; and Catholics include John Hugh Jones and the Benedictine monk and poet Sylvester Houédard.

== Alumni ==
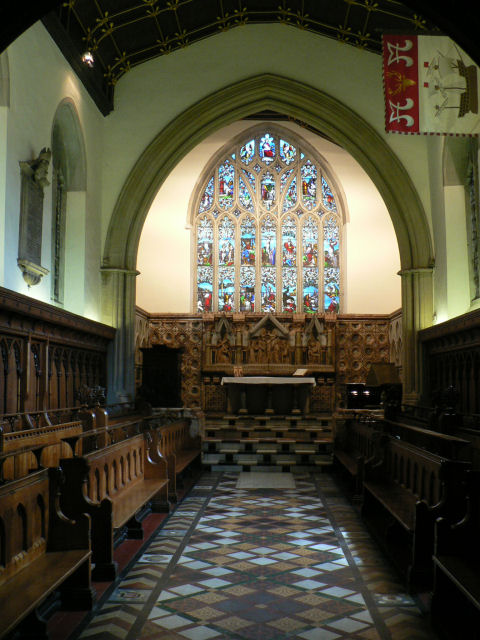
The chapel of Jesus College

Abbreviations used in the following table

- M – Year of matriculation at Jesus College (a dash indicates that the individual did not matriculate at the college)
- G – Year of graduation / conclusion of study at Jesus College (a dash indicates that the individual moved to another college before graduating or concluding studies)
- DNG – Did not graduate: left the college without obtaining a degree
- ? – Year unknown; approximate year used for table-sorting purposes
- (F/P) – later became a fellow or principal of Jesus College, and included on the list of principals and fellows
- (HF) – later became an honorary fellow of Jesus College, and included on the list of honorary fellows

Degree abbreviations

- Undergraduate degree: BA – Bachelor of Arts
- Postgraduate degrees:

- BCL – Bachelor of Civil Law
- BD – Bachelor of Divinity
- BLitt – Bachelor of Letters
- BTh – Bachelor of Theology
- MA – Master of Arts
- MB – Bachelor of Medicine
- MD – Doctor of Medicine
- DCL – Doctor of Civil Law
- DD – Doctor of Divinity
- DPhil – Doctor of Philosophy

The subject studied and the degree classification are included, where known. Until the early 19th century, undergraduates read for a Bachelor of Arts degree that included study of Latin and Greek texts, mathematics, geometry, philosophy and theology. Individual subjects at undergraduate level were only introduced later: for example, Mathematics (1805), Natural Science (1850), Jurisprudence (1851, although it had been available before this to students who obtained special permission), Modern History (1851) and Theology (1871). Geography and Modern Languages were introduced in the 20th century. Music had been taught as a specialist subject, rather than being part of the BA course, before these changes; medicine was studied as a postgraduate subject.

=== Archbishops and bishops ===
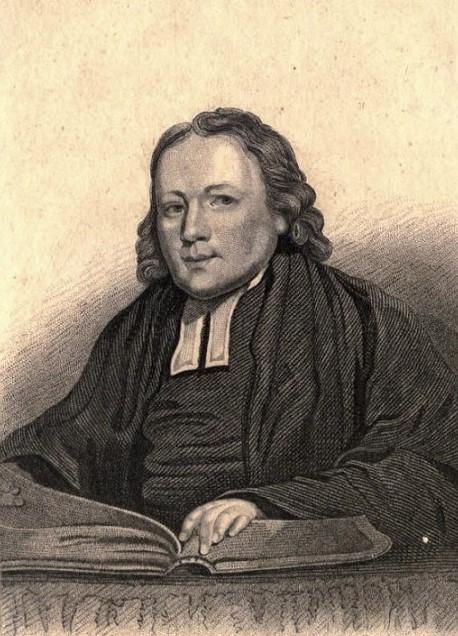
Thomas Coke

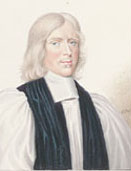
William Lloyd

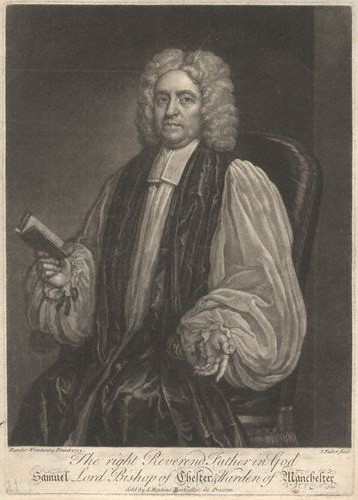
Samuel Peploe

| Name | M | G | Degree | Notes | Ref |
|---|---|---|---|---|---|
| Thomas Coke | 1764 | 1775 | BA (1768), MA (1770), DCL | Methodist bishop | |
| Kenneth Cragg (HF) | 1931 | 1934 | BA Modern History (2nd) (1934), DPhil (1950) | Assistant Bishop of Jerusalem (1970–1973) and writer on Muslim–Christian relations | |
| Francis Davies (F) | 1621 | 1628 | BA (1625), MA (1628), BD (1640), DD (1661) | Bishop of Llandaff (1667–1675) | |
| Roy Davies | ? | 1959 | BLitt | Bishop of Llandaff (1985–1999) | |
| John Dickinson | 1920 | 1923 | BA Literae Humaniores (3rd) | Assistant Bishop of Melanesia (1931–1937) | |
| Alfred George Edwards (HF) | 1871 | 1874 | BA Literae Humaniores (3rd) | First Archbishop of the disestablished Church in Wales (1920–1934) | |
| Rowland Ellis | 1860 | 1863 | BA Natural Science (honorary 4th) | Bishop of Aberdeen and Orkney (1906–1911) | |
| John Harris | 1697 | 1701 | BA (1701), MA (1714) | Bishop of Llandaff (1729–1738), also Dean of Hereford (1729–1736) and of Wells (1736–1738) | |
| William Havard | 1919 | 1921 | BA Modern History | College chaplain (1919–1921) who won his "Blue" for rugby and represented Wales against New Zealand Services in 1919 (his only international) before becoming Bishop of St Asaph (1934–1950) and Bishop of St David's (1950–1956) | |
| Thomas Howell | 1607 | 1612 | BA (1609), MA (1612), BD and DD (1630) | Bishop of Bristol (1644–1645), who was ejected during the English Civil War | |
| Humphrey Humphreys (F) | 1666 | 1672 | BA (1669), MA (1672), BD (1679), DD (1682) | Bishop of Bangor (1689–1701) and Bishop of Hereford (1701–1712) | |
| Albert Joscelyne | 1884 | 1888 | BA Literae Humaniores (3rd) | Bishop Coadjutor of Jamaica (1905–1913) | |
| Daniel Lewis Lloyd | 1862 | 1867 | BA Literae Humaniores (2nd) (1867), MA (1871) | Headmaster of Dolgelley Grammar School, Friars School, Bangor and Christ College, Brecon; later Bishop of Bangor | |
| Humphrey Lloyd | 1628 | — | — | Graduated from Oriel College; Bishop of Bangor (1674–1689) | |
| William Lloyd (F) | 1640 | 1642 | BA (1642), MA (1646), BD and DD (1667) | Bishop of St Asaph (1680–1692), Bishop of Lichfield and Coventry (1692–1699) and Bishop of Worcester (1699–1717) | |
| Richard Meredith | — | 1575 | BA (1573), MA (1575) | Matriculated in 1568, later moving to Jesus College; Bishop of Leighlin (1579–1597) | |
| John Owen | 1872 | 1876 | BA Mathematics (2nd) (2nd in Mods in Classics and in Mathematics) | Professor of Welsh (1879–1889) and principal (1892–1897) at St David's College, Lampeter before becoming Bishop of St David's (1897–1926) | |
| Morgan Owen | 1608 | — | — | Graduated BA from New College and MA from Hart Hall, later becoming Bishop of Llandaff (1639 – c. 1644) | |
| Samuel Peploe | 1689 | 1693 | BA (1691), MA (1693) | Bishop of Chester (1726–1752) | |
| Benjamin Parry | — | 1652 | BA | Matriculated at Trinity College, Dublin in 1648 before moving to Oxford; Bishop of Ossory (January to October 1678) | |
| John Rider | ? | 1583 | BA (1581), MA | Lexicographer and Bishop of Killaloe (1612–1632) | |
| Gordon Roe | 1950 | 1962 | BA French and German (2nd, 1953), Dip Th, DPhil (1962) | Bishop of Huntingdon (1980–1997) | |
| Glyn Simon (HF) | 1922 | 1926 | BA Literae Humaniores (2nd) | Archbishop of Wales (1968–1971) | |
| William Thomas (F) | — | 1635 | BA (1632), MA (1635), DD (1660) | Matriculated from St John's College in 1629 but later moved to Jesus College; Bishop of St David's (1677–1683) and Bishop of Worcester (1683–1689) | |
| Alwyn Williams (HF) | 1906 | 1911 | BA Literae Humaniores (1st) (1910) (1st in Mods in Classics), BA Modern History (1st) (1911) | President of the JCR and Captain of Boats whilst at college; Fellow of All Souls (1911–1918); Bishop of Durham (1939–1952) and Bishop of Winchester (1952–1961) | |
| Gwilym Williams (HF) | 1930 | 1933 | BA English (1st) | Bishop of Bangor (1957–1982) and Archbishop of Wales (1971–1982) | |
| Clifford Woodward (HF) | 1897 | 1901 | BA Literae Humaniores (2nd) | Bishop of Bristol (1933–1946) and Bishop of Gloucester (1946–1953) | |
| John Wynne (F/P) | 1682 | 1685 | BA (1685), BD (1696), DD (1706) | Bishop of St Asaph (1715–1727) and Bishop of Bath and Wells (1727–1743) | |

=== Deans ===
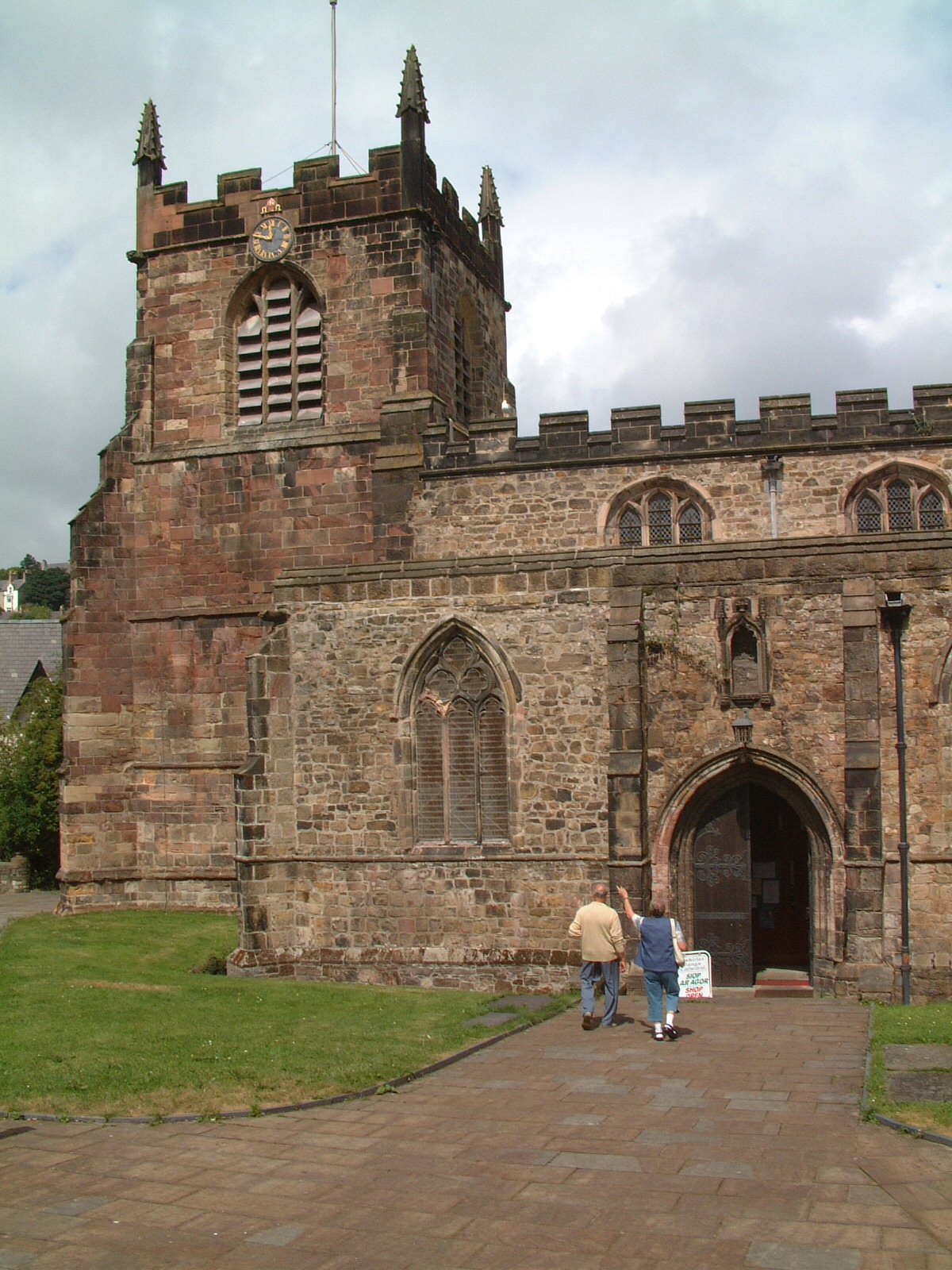
At least five former students of Jesus College have become Dean of Bangor Cathedral.

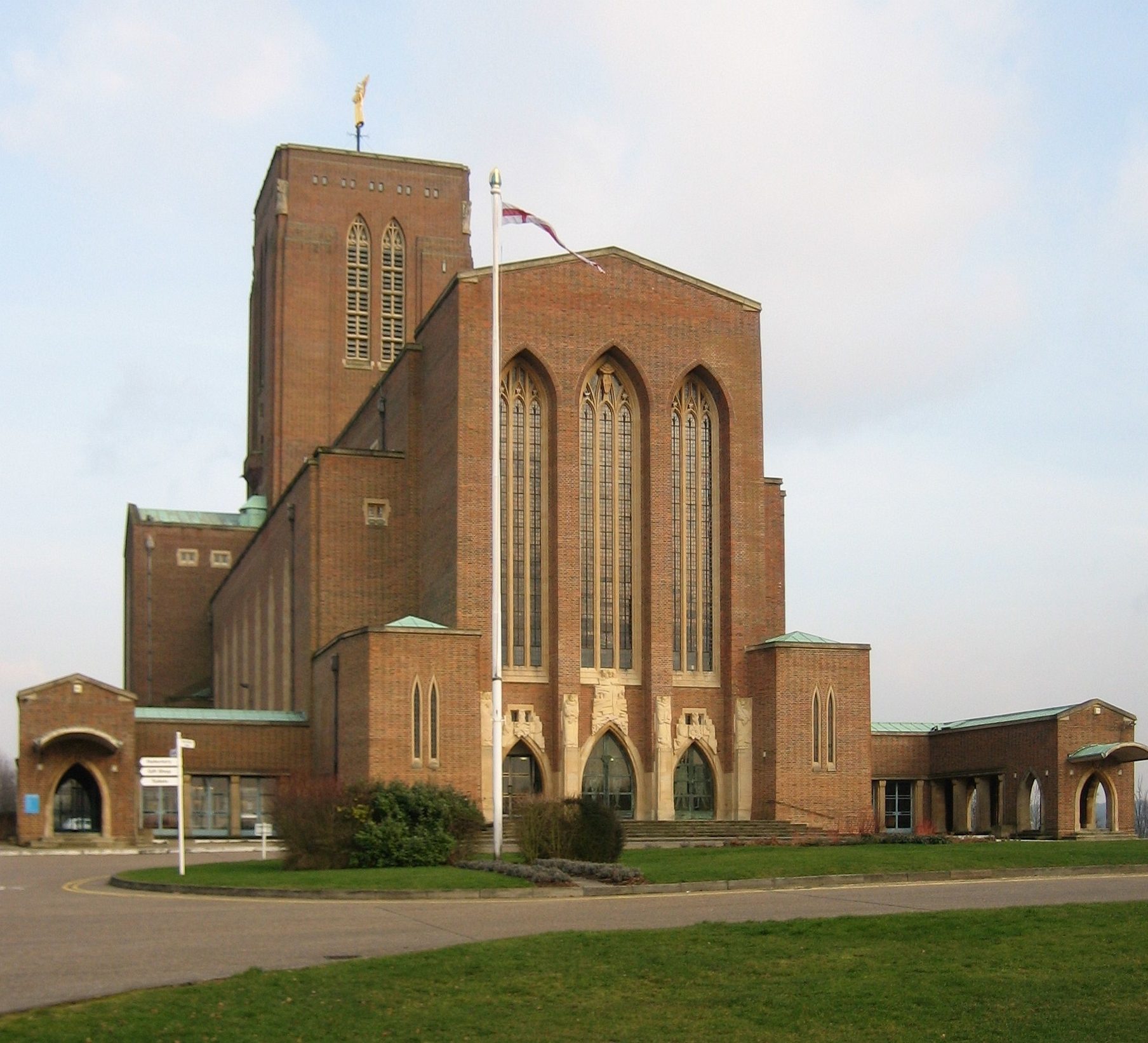
Guildford Cathedral, where Alex Wedderspoon was Dean from 1987 to 2001

| Name | M | G | Degree | Notes | Ref |
|---|---|---|---|---|---|
| Wesley Carr | 1960 | 1964 | BA Literae Humaniores (2nd) | Dean of Westminster Abbey (1997–2006) | |
| Henry Thomas Edwards | 1857 | 1860 | BA | Dean of Bangor (1876–1884) | |
| Llewelyn Hughes | 1913 | 1921 | BA Modern History | Dean of Ripon (1951–1967) | |
| Ungoed Jacob | 1929 | 1932 | BA Modern History (2nd) | Dean of Brecon (1967–1978) | |
| Henry James | 1882 | 1886 | BA Literae Humaniores (2nd) (1886), MA (1891), BD and DD (1924) | Dean of Bangor (1934–1940) | |
| David Jones | 1889 | 1893 | BA Theology (3rd) | Dean of Llandaff (1931–1948) | |
| William Jones | 1919 | 1922 | BA | Dean of Brecon (1950–1964) | |
| Matthew Le Marinel | 1902 | ? | ? | Dean of Jersey (1937–1959) | |
| Llewelyn Lewellin | 1818 | 1827 | BA Literae Humaniores (1st, 1822), MA (1824), BCL (1827), DCL (1829) | First Principal of St David's College, Lampeter (1828–1878), also Dean of St David's (1843–1878) | |
| Evan Lewis | 1838 | 1841 | BA (1841), MA (1863) | Dean of Bangor (1884–1901), and younger brother of David Lewis | |
| John Lewis | ? | 1970 | BA Mathematics (1969), Diploma in Applied Statistics (1970) | Dean of Llandaff since 2000 | |
| John Pryce | 1847 | 1851 | BA | Dean of Bangor (1902–1903) | |
| Edward Roberts | 1896 | ? | BA | Dean of Brecon (1939–1949) | |
| George Stradling | 1638 | 1640 | BA | Dean of Chichester (1672–1688) | |
| James Vincent Vincent (F) | 1811 | 1815 | BA (1815), MA (1817) | Dean of Bangor (1862–1876) | |
| Alex Wedderspoon | 1951 | ? | BA Modern History (2nd, 1954), BD | Dean of Guildford (1987–2001) | |

=== Other cathedral clergy ===
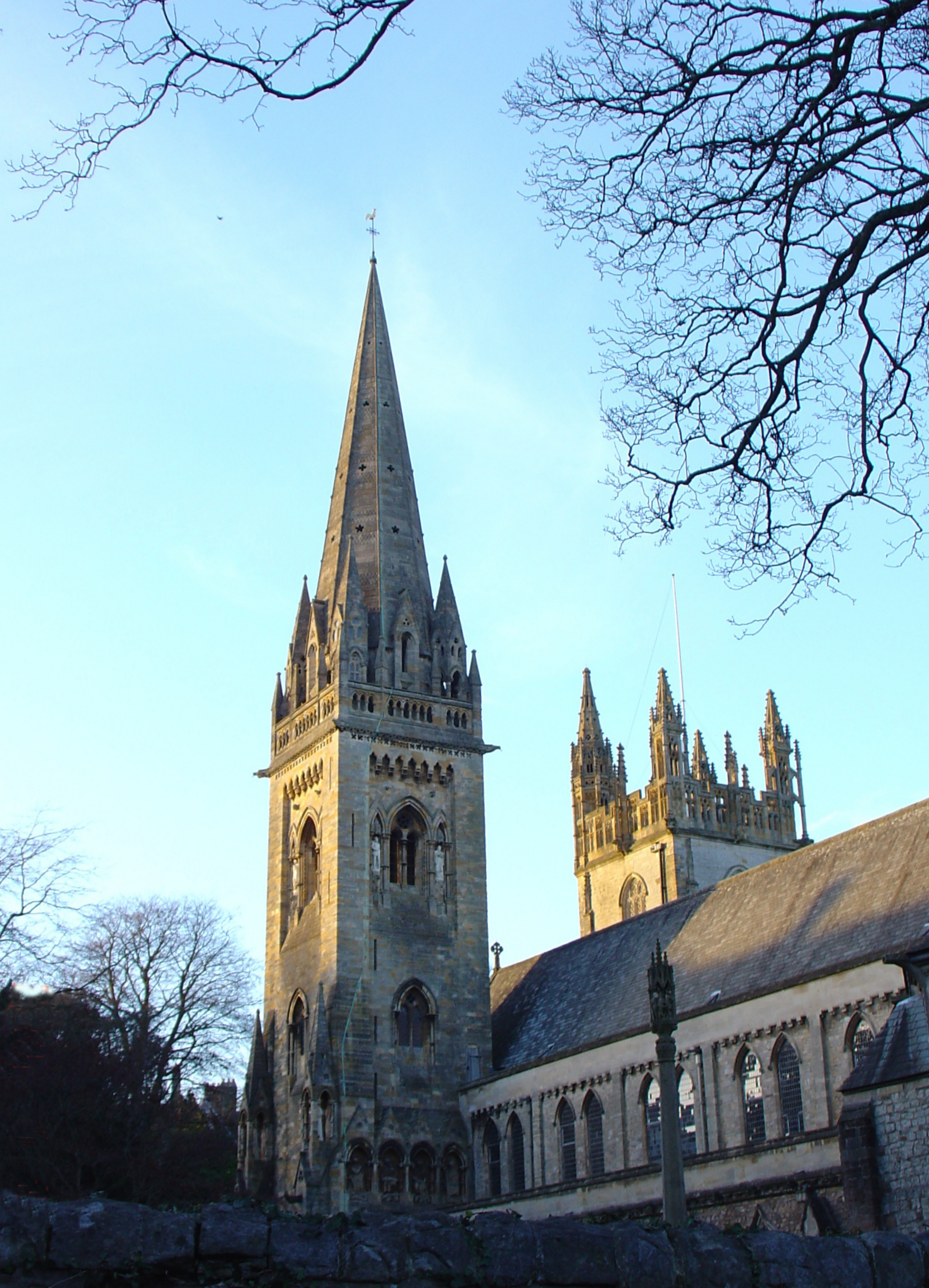
John Jones, William Thomas and Norman Matthews were all Chancellors of Llandaff Cathedral.

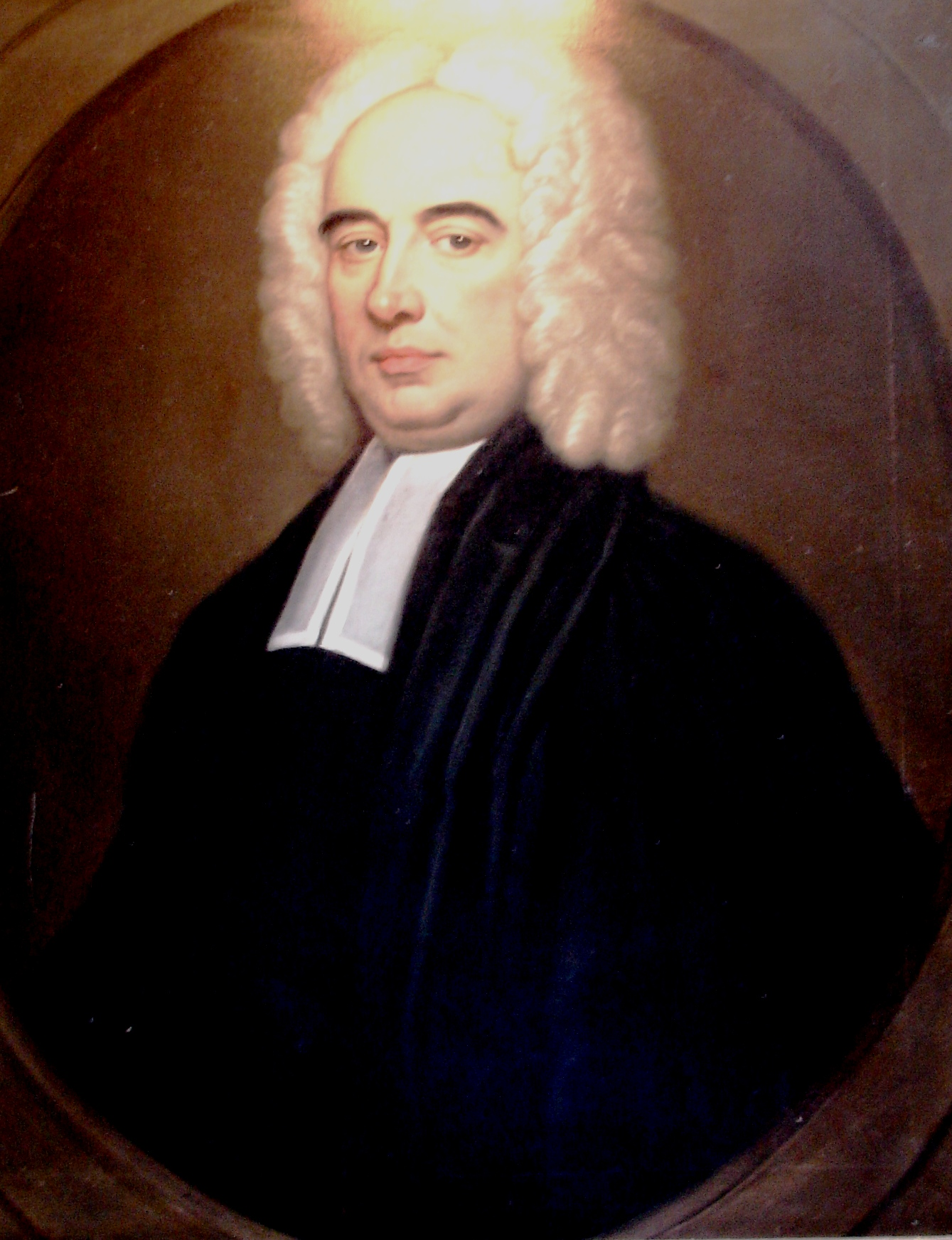
Thomas Pardo, Principal of Jesus College (1727–1763), was also Chancellor of St David's Cathedral (1749–1753).

| Name | M | G | Degree | Notes | Ref |
|---|---|---|---|---|---|
| Thomas Briscoe (F) | 1830 | 1833 | BA (1833), MA (1836), BD (1843), DD (1868) | Vicar of Holyhead for 37 years, chancellor of Bangor Cathedral and translator of the New Testament into Welsh | |
| Richard Farrington | 1720 | 1724 | BA | Welsh priest and antiquarian, with a particular interest in Caernarfonshire; Chancellor of Bangor Cathedral | |
| William Henry Harris | 1910 | 1913 | BA Theology (1913, 2nd), BLitt (1913) | Precentor, Canon and Treasurer of St David's Cathedral; also professor of theology (then professor of Welsh) at St David's College, Lampeter | |
| Joseph Hoare (F/P) | 1727 | 1733 | BA (1730), MA | Prebend of Westminster Abbey; died after being scratched by his cat | |
| John Jones (F) | 1662 | 1666 | BA (1666), MA (1670), BCL (1673), DCL (1677) | Chancellor of Llandaff Cathedral, physician and inventor | |
| Richard Lucas (F) | 1665 | 1668 | BA (1668), MA (1672) | Clergyman and writer of devotional works, who was Prebend of Westminster Abbey and President of Sion College | |
| David Maurice | 1651 | 1655 | BA | Welsh clergyman and translator, who was canon of St Asaph; also obtained an MA from New College, Oxford | |
| Henry Maurice (F) | 1664 | 1668 | BA (1668), MA (1671), BD (1679), DD (1683) | Treasurer of Chichester Cathedral, who was elected Lady Margaret Professor of Divinity at Oxford shortly before his death in 1691 | |
| Norman Matthews | 1922 | 1926 | BA Theology (2nd) | Chancellor of Llandaff Cathedral (1952–1964) and one of the panellists on the BBC television programme "The Brains Trust" | |
| Edmund Meyrick (F) | 1656 | 1659 | BA | Treasurer of St David's Cathedral and a benefactor of Bala Grammar School and Jesus College – his bequest founded the college's Meyrick scholarships for students from North Wales | |
| Richard Middleton | ? | 1586 | BA | Prebend of Brecon, Archdeacon of Cardigan and chaplain to Charles, Prince of Wales (later King Charles I) | |
| Richard Nanney | 1710 | 1714 | BA | Evangelical Anglican cleric in north Wales and a canon of Bangor | |
| John Owen | 1719 | DNG | — | Chancellor of Bangor Cathedral and strong opponent of Methodism | |
| Thomas Pardo (F/P) | 1707 | 1711 | BA (1708), MA (1711), BD (1719), DD (1727) | Chancellor of St David's (1749–1753) | |
| Gabriel Powell | 1592 | 1596 | BA | Son of the clergyman and historian David Powel; prebend of St Paul's Cathedral, London and prominent anti-Catholic writer | |
| Theodore Price (F) | ? | 1591 | BA (1588), MA (1591) | Prebend of Westminster Abbey and principal of Hart Hall, Oxford | |
| William Prichard (F) | 1581 | — | — | Graduated from Christ Church before becoming vicar of Abergavenny, rector of Ewelme, Oxfordshire and canon of Sarum and St Pauls; named as one of the founding fellows in the college's third charter (1622) | |
| Thomas Richards | 1708 | 1711 | BA | Canon of St Asaph's Cathedral, who was also a writer and satirist | |
| Henry Rogers | 1602 | 1608 | BA (1605), MA (1608), BD (1616), DD (1637) | Prebend of Hereford Cathedral, who preached against the Roundheads during the English Civil War | |
| William Thomas | 1751 | — | — | Graduated from Oriel College before becoming a Fellow of Pembroke College and chancellor of Llandaff Cathedral | |
| James Williams (F) | 1807 | 1810 | BA (1810), BD (1820) | Chancellor of Bangor Cathedral, who introduced John Rhys to Charles Williams, leading to Rhys winning a scholarship at the college | |
| Robert Wynne (F) | 1677 | 1680 | BA (1680), MA (1691), BD (1691), DD (1695) | Chancellor of St Asaph (1690–1743), and elder brother of the historian William Wynne | |

=== Other Anglican clergy ===
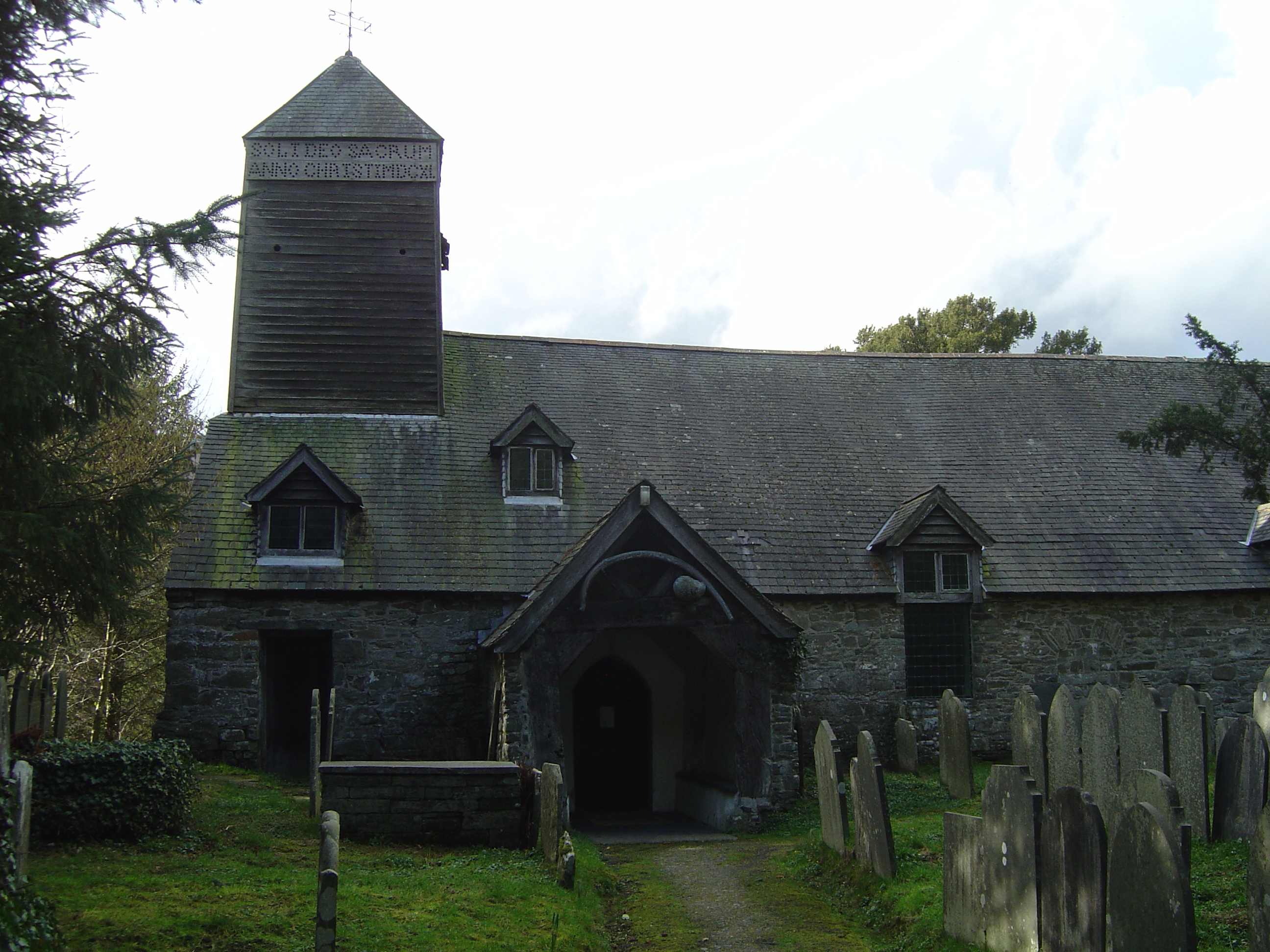
Mallwyd church, where John Davies was rector

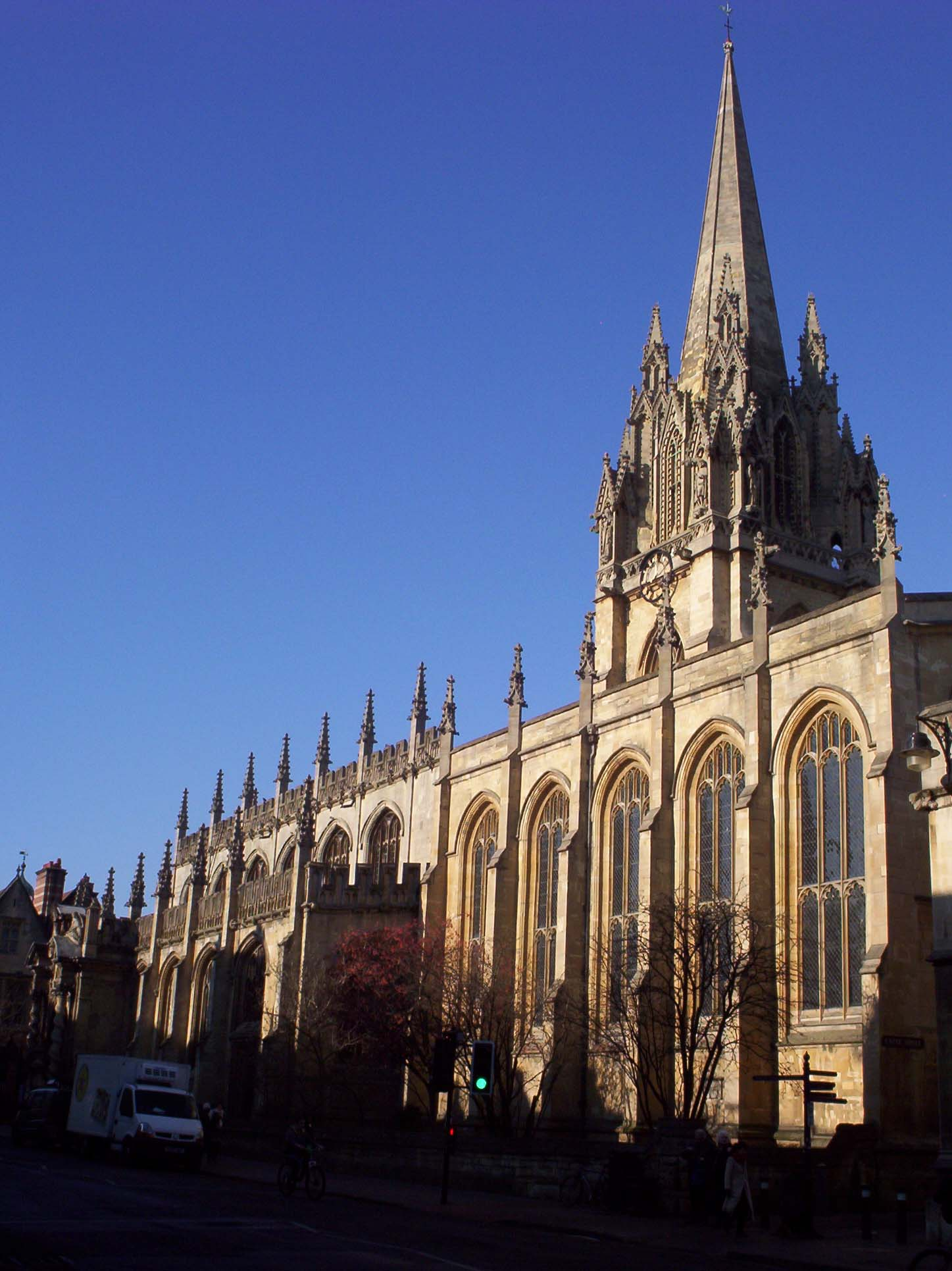
The University Church of St Mary the Virgin, Oxford, where Edmund Ffoulkes was vicar

| Name | M | G | Degree | Notes | Ref |
|---|---|---|---|---|---|
| James Bandinel (F) | 1752 | 1758 | BA (1755), MA (1758), BD (1767), DD (1777) | University Proctor (1776) and Public Orator (1776–1784) | |
| Richard Bassett | 1797 | DNG2 | — | Welsh cleric, thought to be the last Anglican clergyman to be associated with the Methodists | |
| John Caldicott | — | 1851 | BA Literae Humaniores (2nd, 1851), BA Mathematics (3rd, 1851), BD and DD (1874) | Matriculated from Pembroke College; Anglican priest and headmaster of Bristol Grammar School | |
| J. R. Cohu (F) | 1876 | 1880 | BA Literae Humaniores (1st, 1880), MA (1883) | Headmaster, clergyman and writer on biblical topics | |
| William Lucas Collins | 1833 | 1840 | BA Literae Humaniores (2nd, 1838), MA (1840) | Clergyman and contributor to Blackwood's Magazine | |
| David Davies | 1761 | DNG | — | Clergyman and author of The Case of Labourers in Husbandry, advocating a minimum wage for agricultural labourers | |
| Hugh Davies | 1757 | 1762 | BA | Welsh clergyman and botanist, whose main work, Welsh Botanology (1813), was the first to cross-reference the names of plants in Welsh with their scientific names | |
| John Davies | 1589 | 1594 | BA | Rector of Mallwyd, Gwynedd, who was also a lexicographer and translator of the Bible into Welsh (1620 edition); awarded further degrees of BD (1608) and DD as a member of Lincoln College | |
| Edward Edwards (F) | 1743 | 1747 | BA | Cleric, with a particular interest in Xenophon's Memorabilia | |
| John Edwards | 1825 | 1830 | BA | Welsh cleric and composer, most notably of the hymn tune Rhosymedre (named after his parish) | |
| John Edwards | 1624 | 1629 | BA (1626), MA (1629) | Welsh priest and translator, whose pseudonym was "Siôn Treredyn" | |
| Jonathan Edwards (F) | 1633 | 1637 | BA (1634), MA (1637), DD (1642) | Archdeacon of Derry | |
| David Ellis | 1794 | DNG | — | Welsh clergyman, poet and transcriber of manuscripts, who was at the college from March to June 1794 | |
| John Ellis (F) | 1690 | 1696 | BA (1693), MA (1696) | Welsh cleric and antiquarian | |
| Philip Ellis | 1840 | 1846 | BA (1844), MA (1846) | One of the earliest Tractarians in north Wales; Foster gives his BA date as 1844, but Ellis gave it as 1843. | |
| Thomas Ellis (F) | 1728 | 1731 | BA (1731), BD (1741) | Welsh cleric, appointed to college livings in Holyhead and Nutfield, Surrey | |
| David Evans | ? | 1731 | BA (1728), MA (1731) | Welsh priest, scholar and musician | |
| John Evans | 1722 | ? | ? | Welsh anti-Methodist cleric; a founder member of the Honourable Society of Cymmrodorion; whilst a "John Evans" from Jesus College graduated with a BA in 1726, it is unclear whether that was this individual | |
| Edmund Ffoulkes (F) | 1837 | 1841 | BA Literae Humaniores (2nd) | Anglican priest who converted to Roman Catholicism and back to Anglicanism, becoming vicar of the University Church of St Mary the Virgin; nephew of Principal Henry Foulkes | |
| Peter Fogg | 1855 | 1859 | BA Literae Humaniores (3rd) | First Jesus man to become President of the Oxford Union; Archdeacon of George in the Cape of Good Hope (1871–1920) | |
| Humphrey Foulkes | 1691 | 1698 | BA (1695), MA (1698), DD (1720) | Vicar in parishes in Denbighshire and Merionethshire, who corresponded with Edward Lhuyd on antiquarian topics | |
| William Foulkes | 1650 | 1653 | BA | Vicar in parishes in Denbighshire and Montgomeryshire, and translator of theological works | |
| William Weekes Fowler | — | 1873 | BA | Matriculated at New College before transferring to Jesus with a scholarship; a clergyman, headmaster and entomologist who was President of the Incorporated Association of Head Masters and President of the Entomological Society of London | |
| Lewis Gilbertson (F) | 1833 | 1839 | BA Literae Humaniores (3rd, 1836), MA (1839), BD (1847) | Vicar in parishes in Cardiganshire, and also served as Vice-Principal | |
| Richard Hancorne | 1705 | 1714 | BA (1709), MA (1714) | Rector in parishes in Glamorgan | |
| Thomas Hancorne | 1773 | — | — | Rector and Vicar in parishes in Glamorgan, Deputy Lieutenant (DL) and Justice of the Peace (JP) for the county of Glamorgan. | |
| David Hughes | 1803 | 1806 | BA | Rector of Llanfyllin for over 35 years; made corrections to the 1809 version of the Welsh Bible published by Oxford University Press | |
| Edward James (F) | — | 1592f | BA (1589), MA (1592) | Matriculated from St Edmund Hall before moving to Jesus College; a Welsh Anglican priest and translator | |
| Herbert Armitage James | 1863 | — | — | Transferred to Lincoln College when he won a scholarship in 1864; priest, who later became headmaster of Rugby School and President of St John's College, Oxford | |
| John David Jenkins (F) | 1846 | 1852 | BA Literae Humaniores (3rd, 1850), MA (1852), BD (1859), DD (1871) | Canon of Pietermaritzburg, later called the "Rail men's Apostle" for his ministry to railway workers in Oxford | |
| John Jenkins | ? | — | — | Welsh priest and antiquarian, known as Ifor Ceri, who helped to establish eisteddfodau in Wales in the early nineteenth century; graduated from Merton College | |
| Constantine Jessop | 1624 | 1632 | MA | Transferred to Trinity College, Dublin and obtained his BA there, incorporating his BA at Oxford on his return; a priest in Fyfield, Essex, Bristol and Wimborne Minster | |
| Griffith Arthur Jones | 1847 | 1851 | BA | Welsh priest and supporter of the Oxford Movement | |
| Hugh Jones (F) | 1832 | 1839 | BA Literae Humaniores (3rd, 1836), MA (1839) | Later Archdeacon of St Asaph | |
| Hugh Jones | 1708 | 1716 | BA (1712), MA (1716) | Professor of Mathematics, College of William & Mary, Virginia (1717–1721); Minister at Jamestown; Chaplain of The House of Burgesses; Author of The Present State of Virginia (1724); Rector of North Sassafras Parish, Cecil County, Maryland (1731–1760). | |
| John Jones | ? | 1798 | BA | Archdeacon of Merioneth; Bampton Lecturer at Oxford in 1821 | |
| John Jones | ? | 1796 | BA | Welsh priest, scholar and literary patron, who supported John Blackwell ("Alun") and others in their work | |
| John Jones | 1804 | 1808John Jones (archdeacon) | ? | Cleric in Caernarfonshire and antiquarian; known as "Llef o'r Nant" | |
| John Jones | 1814 | 1818 | BA Mathematics (2nd) | Welsh clergyman and scholar (known as "Tegid), who transcribed the Red Book of Hergest for Lady Charlotte Guest | |
| Maurice Jones (F/HF) | 1882 | 1886 | BA Divinity (1st, 1886), BD (1907), DD (1914) | Welsh clergyman and principal of St David's College, Lampeter (1923–1938) | |
| Richard Jones | ? | 1628 | BA (1623), MA (1628) | Welsh priest and writer; deprived of his living in Llanfair Caereinion during the English Commonwealth but continued to minister in the parish | |
| Richard Jones | ? | ? | BA | Welsh priest and writer, who ministered in Ruthin and may also have taught at Ruthin School | |
| Robert Jones | 1833 | 1837 | BA | Vicar of All Saints, Rotherhithe, London for over 35 years; a promoter of Welsh culture in London | |
| Thomas Jones | 1641 | — | — | Studies interrupted by the English Civil War and graduated from University College; a Welsh clergyman who had a long-running argument with Bishop George Morley about the conversion of the Duke of York's wife to Catholicism | |
| William Jones | 1773 | 1780 | BA | Studies interrupted by working as a tutor to the family of a government servant in Jamaica; vicar of Broxbourne, Hertfordshire, and friend and correspondent of his college contemporary Thomas Charles | |
| Erasmus Lewes | 1684 | 1688 | BA | Vicar of Lampeter, Cardiganshire | |
| David Lewis | 1782 | DNG | — | Clergyman in Carmarthenshire | |
| David Lewis (F) | 1834 | 1837 | BA Literae Humaniores (2nd) | Ordained as an Anglican priest, but converted to Catholicism with John Henry Newman; the elder brother of Evan Lewis | |
| Pierce Lewis | 1661 | 1664 | BA | Clergyman and "corrector" of his kinsman William Lloyd's Welsh Bible of 1690 | |
| Harold Littler | ? | 1910 | BA Modern History (2nd) | Anglican priest and headmaster of Sir William Turner's School, Coatham | |
| David Lloyd | 1707 | 1714 | BA (1712) MA (1714) | Cleric and translator | |
| John Lloyd | 1753 | 1757 | BA | Cleric (at Caerwys and Nannerch) and antiquarian | |
| John Lloyd (F) | 1758 | 1762 | BA (1762), BD (1772) | Vicar of Holywell and Cilcain | |
| Thomas Lloyd | 1689 | 1695 | BA (1692), MA (1695) | Welsh cleric and lexicographer | |
| Thomas Lloyd | 1839 | 1843 | BA | Welsh cleric and participant at eisteddfods (bardic name Yr Estyn) | |
| William Lloyd | 1819 | 1825 | BA (1822), MA (1825) | Later Archdeacon of Durban | |
| Peter Maurice | 1822 | 1826 | BA (1826), MA (1829), BD (1837), DD (1840) | Welsh cleric and hymn writer, who was chaplain of New College (1828–1858) and of All Souls College (1837–1858) | |
| John Morgan | 1704 | 1708 | BA | Clergyman (who was known as John Morgan Matchin after his appointment to a position in Matching, Essex) and author of Myfyrdodau bucheddol ar y pedwar peth diweddaf ('Devout musings on the four last things') (1714) | |
| Cadwallader Owen | 1581 | 1589 | BA (1583), MA (1589) | Clergyman and debator | |
| Edward Owen | 1746 | 1752 | BA (1749), MA (1752) | Welsh priest and translator, who was headmaster of the grammar school in Warrington | |
| Henry Owen | 1736 | 1746 | BA (1739), MA (1743), MB (1746), MD 1753 | Clergyman, theologian and biblical scholar | |
| Nicholas Owen | 1769 | 1776 | BA (1773), MA (1776) | Welsh Anglican clergyman and antiquarian | |
| Thomas Owen | 1767 | 1770 | BA | Rector of Upton Scudamore, Wiltshire and translator of works on agriculture | |
| Henry Parry | 1786 | 1790 | BA | Welsh cleric and antiquarian | |
| William Parry (F) | 1706 | 1712 | BA (1709), MA (1712), BD (1719) | Antiquarian and rector of Shipston-on-Stour, Warwickshiref | |
| Henry Perry | – | 1583 | MA (1583), BTh (1597) | Initially a member of Balliol College; a Welsh priest and writer | |
| John Pettingall | 1725 | 1728 | BA | Antiquarian and priest | |
| Griffith Powell (F/P) | 1581 | 1593 | BA (1584), MA (1589), BCL | Aristotelian philosopher | |
| Thomas Powell | 1628 | 1632 | BA (1629), MA (1632), DD (1600) | Welsh cleric who lost office during the English Commonwealth; said to have been nominated as Bishop of Bristol but died before being appointed | |
| Thomas Prichard (F) | 1610 | 1615 | BA (1612), MA (1615), BD and DD (1628) | Held various benefices in Pembrokeshire and named as one of the founding fellows in the college's third charter (1622) | |
| Daniel Rees | 1815 | DNG | — | Welsh cleric and hymn writer | |
| William Rees | 1889 | 1892 | BA Literae Humaniores (2nd) | Welsh priest and writer | |
| William Rider | — | 1745 | BA | Matriculated from St Mary Hall before transferring to the college; a cleric and writer, whose 50-volume work A New History of England was later described as one of the vilest Grub Street compilations ever published | |
| John Roberts | 1792 | 1796 | BA | Welsh cleric and writer | |
| Robert Roberts | 1699 | 1702 | BA | Welsh cleric and theologian | |
| Erasmus Saunders | 1690 | 1696 | BA (1693), MA (1696), BD (1705), DD (1712) | Welsh priest and writer | |
| Charles Symmons | — | 1794 | DD | Welsh priest and writer; a graduate of the University of Cambridge who was incorporated at Oxford in order to take his DD after being involved in controversy at Cambridge | |
| David Thomas | 1852 | 1856 | BA Literae Humaniores (3rd) | Canon of St Asaph and Archdeacon of Montgomery; wrote History of the Diocese of St Asaph, the first such history of a Welsh diocese | |
| David Thomas | 1847 | 1851 | BA Literae Humaniores (3rd) | Parish priest in Gwynedd who was instrumental in the foundation of a Welsh church in the Welsh settlement in Argentina | |
| John Thomas | 1755 | 1758 | BA | Welsh cleric and antiquarian, who collected and transcribed manuscripts, and wrote a History of the Island of Anglesey (1775); elder brother of Richard Thomas, who also attended the college | |
| John Lloyd Thomas | 1930 | 1932 | BA Theology (2nd) | Principal of St David's College, Lampeter (1953–1975) | |
| Llewellyn Thomas (F) | 1860 | 1865 | BA Literae Humaniores (3rd) | Welsh cleric, poet and scholar, who was the college's Welsh reader, senior tutor and vice-principal | |
| Richard Thomas | 1771 | 1775 | BA | Welsh cleric and antiquarian, who collected and transcribed manuscripts; younger brother of John Thomas, who also attended the college | |
| Thomas Thomas | 1824 | 1827 | BA | Welsh cleric ("Thomas of Caernarfon") who helped to found schools in Caernarfon; the father of Llewellyn Thomas | |
| Thomas Vane | 1616 | DNG | — | Transferred to Christ's College, Cambridge; later appointed Chaplain Extraordinary to King Charles I in 1626 before converting to Roman Catholicism | |
| James Vincent | 1735 | 1739 | BA | Welsh cleric and schoolteacher, who was Master of the Friars School, Bangor; grandfather of James Vincent, who also attended the college | |
| Thomas Wilkins | 1641 | 1661 | ? (Law) | Welsh cleric and antiquarian, from whose collection of manuscripts the Red Book of Hergest was donated to the college after his death | |
| Charles Williams | 1925 | 1929 | BA Theology (1st) | Theologian and chaplain of Merton College, Oxford (1932–1962) | |
| David Williams | 1810 | 1814 | BA | Anglican priest in Bleadon, Somerset and geologist who wrote extensively of the geology of the west of England | |
| Eliezer Williams | 1775 | 1778 | BA | Welsh clergyman, ship's chaplain and genealogist | |
| Hugh Williams | 1740 | 1744 | BA | Welsh clergyman and writer | |
| John Williams | 1832 | 1838 | BA Mathematics (4th, 1835), MA (1838) | Priest and Welsh scholar (bardic name Ab Ithel), who edited Y Gododdin and completed Aneurin Owen's edition of Annales Cambriae | |
| John Williams | 1783 | — | DNG | Cleric in Pembrokeshire with Methodist sympathies | |
| John Williams (F) | 1777 | 1783 | BA (1781), MA | Cleric in north Wales and master of the Free school in Llanrwst (1790–1812) | |
| Peter Bailey Williams | 1785 | — | — | Cleric in north Wales whose Sunday school in Llanrug was the first in the county; graduated from Christ Church in 1790 | |
| Rowland Williams | 1798 | 1802 | BA | Cleric in north Wales, father of the theologian Rowland Williams | |
| Thomas Williams | 1674 | 1680 | BA (1677), MA (1680) | Cleric in north Wales and translator of religious texts | |
| William Worthington | 1722 | 1726 | BA (1726), BD and DD (1738) | Cleric in north Wales and writer on theological issues who delivered the Boyle Lectures (1766–68) | |
| William Wynn | 1727 | 1735 | BA (1730), MA (1735) | Welsh cleric and poet | |
| William Wynne (F) | 1688 | 1691 | BA | Welsh cleric who wrote a History of Wales (1697), a revised version of David Powel's history; younger brother of the priest Robert Wynne | |

=== Clergy from other denominations ===
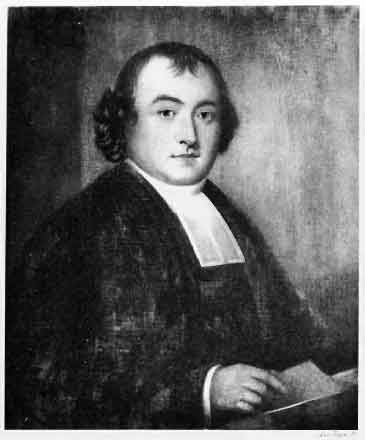
Thomas Charles

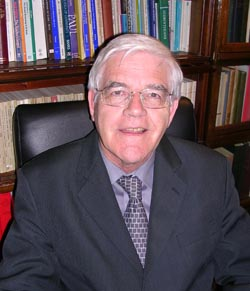
John Tudno Williams

| Name | M | G | Degree | Notes | Ref |
|---|---|---|---|---|---|
| Christopher Bassett | 1768 | 1775 | BA (1772), MA (1775) | Welsh Methodist cleric | |
| David Charles | 1831 | 1835 | BA | Grandson of Thomas Charles and lodged in his rooms in college; Welsh Methodist cleric, who was principal of Trevecca College for 20 years and helped to establish the University College of Wales, Aberystwyth | |
| Thomas Charles | 1775 | 1779 | BA | Welsh nonconformist clergyman; grandfather of David Charles | |
| Gwilym Davies | 1903 | ? | ? | Baptist minister and promoter of world peace; the first person to broadcast in Welsh (on St David's Day 1923) | |
| William David Davies | 1915 | ? | BA Literae Humaniores (2nd, 1921), BA Theology (1st, 1922), BD | Welsh Presbyterian minister who was the first Welsh non-conformist to obtain a BD from Oxford, and who turned down a university tutorship in theology since it required membership of the Church of England; Professor of the history of religions and the philosophy of religion at the United Theological College Aberystwyth (1928–1933) | |
| Charles Edwards | — | 1649 | BA | Originally a Bible clerk at All Souls College, Oxford; a Welsh Puritan cleric and writer | |
| Gwilym Edwards | 1903 | 1908 | BA Literae Humaniores (3rd, 1907), BA Theology (1st, 1908) | Welsh Presbyterian minister; Principal of the United Theological College Aberystwyth (1939–1949) | |
| Walter Jenkin Evans | ? | 1878 | BA | Principal of Carmarthen Presbyterian College (1888–1927) | |
| Griffith Griffith | 1909 | ? | ? | Welsh Presbyterian minister and writer | |
| Sylvester Houédard | 1941 | 1949 | ? | Studies interrupted by war service; a Benedictine monk and poet (known as "dom silvester houédard" or "dsh") | |
| John Hugh Jones | 1862 | DNG | — | Became a Roman Catholic in 1865 and did not complete his degree; later became a Catholic priest and tutor in north Wales | |
| John Islan Jones | 1898 | 1901 | ? | Welsh Unitarian minister and writer, who was principal of Carmarthen Presbyterian College from 1945 to 1948 | |
| Samuel Jones (F) | 1648 | 1652 | BA (1652), MA (1654) | Non-conformist clergyman who established an academy in Wales for dissenting ministers | |
| Simon Lloyd | 1775 | 1779 | BA | Welsh Anglican clergyman who became a Methodist preacher; a respected biblical scholar and writer | |
| William Lloyd | ? | ? | ? | Welsh Anglican clergyman who became a Methodist preacher | |
| Henry Maurice | ? | ? | ? | Welsh Anglican clergyman who became a zealous dissenting preacher | |
| J. E. Meredith | 1928 | 1931 | BA Theology (1st) | Welsh Presbyterian minister, preacher and writer, who had been the first Welsh President of the National Union of Students | |
| Huw Owen | 1944 | 1949 | BA Theology (2nd) | Welsh Presbyterian minister, who was Professor of Christian Doctrine at King's College London (1971–1983) | |
| Hugh Owen | 1660 | DNG | — | Welsh Independent minister | |
| Vavasor Powell | 1634 | ? | ? | Welsh Nonconformist preacher and writer, who is reputed to have attended the college but is not found in the records | |
| John Roberts | 1899 | 1904 | BA Literae Humaniores (3rd, 1903), BA Theology (2nd, 1904) | Welsh Presbyterian minister and historian of his denomination | |
| Henry Walter | 1633 | 1633 | BCL | Welsh Anglican priest who was ejected from his parish for his non-conformist beliefs; an associate of William Wroth | |
| David Williams | ? | ? | BA Literae Humaniores, BA Theology | Welsh Calvinistic Methodist minister and professor at the United Theological College Aberystwyth | |
| John Williams | 1647 | DNG | — | Said to have introduced non-conformism to Caernarfonshire and to have had a preaching voice that carried for a quarter of a mile; also worked as a physician | |
| John Tudno Williams | 1957 | 1960 | BA Theology (2nd) | Lecturer, then principal (1998–2003) of the United Theological College Aberystwyth, and Moderator of the General Assembly of the Presbyterian Church of Wales (2006–2007) | |
| Thomas Charles Williams | ? | 1897 | BA | Welsh Calvinistic Methodist minister, based in Menai Bridge throughout his ministry; also served as Moderator of the Calvinistic Methodist General Assembly | |
| William Wroth | — | 1605 | MA | Welsh cleric credited with founding the first non-conformist chapel in Wales, in Llanvaches (1639); matriculated from New Inn Hall in 1590 and obtained his BA from Christ Church in 1596 | |
