= Thomas Thomas =

Thomas Thomas is the name of:

== Entertainment ==
- Thomas Thomas (harpist) (1829–1913), Welsh
- Thomas Henry Thomas (1839–1915), Welsh artist better known as T. H. Thomas
- Thomas L. Thomas (1911–1983), Welsh American baritone concert singer
- Thomas Thurston Thomas (born 1948), American science fiction writer
- Thomas, Thomas, German short comedy film

== Politics ==
- Thomas Shenton Thomas (1879–1962), last Governor of Straits Settlements
- Thomas Thomas (politician), Singaporean politician
- Thomas K. Thomas, Indian politician

== Religion ==
- Thomas Thomas (architect) (1817–1888), Welsh church minister and chapel architect
- Thomas Thomas (priest) (1804–1877), Welsh cleric ("Thomas of Caernarfon")
- Thomas Llewellyn Thomas (1840–1897), clergyman and scholar of the Welsh language
- T. Rees Thomas, Australian Congregationalist minister

== Sports ==
- Tommy "Franco" Thomas American heavyweight boxer from Clarksburg, West Virginia
- Thomas John Thomas (1877–?), Welsh international footballer
- Thomas Thomas (boxer) (1880–1911), first UK middleweight boxing champion
- T. Rhys Thomas, Welsh rugby player

== Other ==
- Thomas Thomas (abolitionist) (1817-1894), American abolitionist and entrepreneur
- Thomas Thomas (surgeon) (1917–1998), Indian thoracic surgeon and writer
- Thomas Thomas, senior architect at T. Thomas and Son
- T. Darrah Thomas (1932 – 2021), American chemist and faculty of Oregon State University

== See also ==
- Tommy Thomas (disambiguation)
- Tom Thomas (disambiguation)
- Thomas (surname)
