= James Vincent =

James Vincent may refer to:

- James Vincent (director) (1882–1957), American actor and film director of the silent era
- James Vincent (footballer) (born 1989), English footballer
- James Vincent (priest, born 1718) (1718–1783), Welsh Anglican priest and schoolmaster
- James Vincent (priest, born 1792) (1792–1876), Welsh cleric, the Dean of Bangor
- James Edmund Vincent (1857–1909), Welsh barrister, journalist and author
- James L. Vincent (1940–2013), chairman and CEO of Biogen Idec from 1985 to 2002
- James Carroll Vincent (1897–1948), silent movie actor
- James E. Matthew Vincent, British newspaper editor and trade union leader
- James Vincent Shanahan (born 1977), American vocalist and lead singer of metalcore band Hatebreed
