= Hefin =

Hefin (/ˈhɛvɪn/ HEV-in) is a Welsh surname and male given name. Notable people with this name include:

== Surname ==
- David Thomas (Dewi Hefin) (1828–1909), Welsh poet and teacher
- John Hefin (1941–2012), Welsh television director

== Given name ==
- Hefin David (1977–2025), Welsh politician
- Hefin O'Hare (born 1979), Welsh rugby union and rugby league player
