= Ernest Newton (priest) =

Archdeacon of the Seychelles (1868–1945)

Ernest Alfred Newton (1868–1945) was Archdeacon of the Seychelles from 1912 to 1917.

Newton was educated at King's College, Cambridge and Wells Theological College; and ordained in 1893. After curacies in Aylesbury and Cookham he was Rector at St Paul, Darjeeling then Civil Chaplain at Mahé, Seychelles before his time as Archdeacon.
