= Tommy Thomas =

Tommy Thomas may refer to:

- Tommy Thomas (boxer) (1954–2021), American heavyweight boxer and police officer
- Tommy Thomas (barrister) (born 1952), Malaysian barrister, Attorney General of Malaysia
- Tommy Thomas (pitcher) (Alphonse Thomas, 1899–1988), major league pitcher from 1926–1937
- Tommy Thomas (baseball coach), long-time college baseball coach
- Tommy Thomas (politician) (1899–1980), Canadian politician from the Ontario ridings of Ontario and Oshawa
- Fletcher Stewart Thomas (1897–1957), or Tommy Thomas, Canadian politician from the Ontario riding of Elgin
- Tommy Thomas (sheriff), former Republican sheriff of Harris County, Texas
- Harry Thomas Jr. (born 1960), nicknamed Tommy, city council member in Washington, D.C.

== See also ==
- Thomas Thomas (disambiguation)
- Tom Thomas (disambiguation)
