= William Rees (priest and writer) =

Welsh priest and writer

William Goodman Edwards Rees (1859 – 2 September 1936) was a Welsh priest and writer.

== Life ==
Rees was the son of Henry Rees (an iron and tinplate manufacturer from Llanelli, south Wales) and his wife Mabella. He was educated privately in England and Normandy before studying at the University of Glasgow, winning a scholarship, and then Jesus College, Oxford, where he held a Meyrick exhibition open to Welsh students, and obtained a second-class degree in Literae Humaniores in 1892. He was ordained deacon in 1888 and priest in 1892, serving as curate (and later vicar) of Rainhill, then as vicar of St Thomas's Pendleton, rector of St James's Gorton and rector (and rural dean) of Rothbury, Northumberland. He was appointed an honorary canon of Manchester in 1910, holding this position until 1930, when he became Canon Emeritus. He was awarded an honorary DD by the University of Glasgow in 1910. His writings included The Parson's Outlook and The Results of Secular Systems of Education, as well as contributions to journals and newspapers. He died on 2 September 1936 at home in Bideford.
