= Henry Ferne =

English bishop

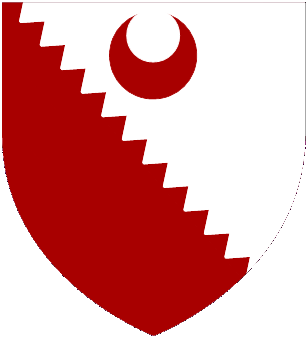
Arms: Party per bend indented Argent and Gules a crescent for difference.

Henry Ferne (1602 – 16 March 1662) was an English bishop.

== Life ==
Ferne was born in York. He was educated at Uppingham School to which he was sent by Sir Thomas Nevill of Holt who had married his mother. He was admitted to St Mary Hall, Oxford, in 1618, and to Trinity College, Cambridge, in 1620. He graduated B.A. in 1623 and was elected fellow in 1624. He was awarded a D.D. at Cambridge in 1642. He became Chaplain Extraordinary to Charles I; Master of Trinity College, Cambridge, from 1660 to 1662; Dean of Ely, about 1662; Bishop of Chester, February 1662, and died in Chester five weeks after his consecration, on 16 March.

== Works ==
He wrote many controversial pamphlets and was one of those who attacked James Harrington's book The Commonwealth of Oceana (1656).

Church of England titles
Preceded by Brian Walton	Bishop of Chester; 1662–1662	Succeeded by George Hall
Academic offices
Preceded by John Wilkins	Master of Trinity College, Cambridge; 1660–1662	Succeeded by John Pearson
