= Charles ffoulkes =

British historian and curator

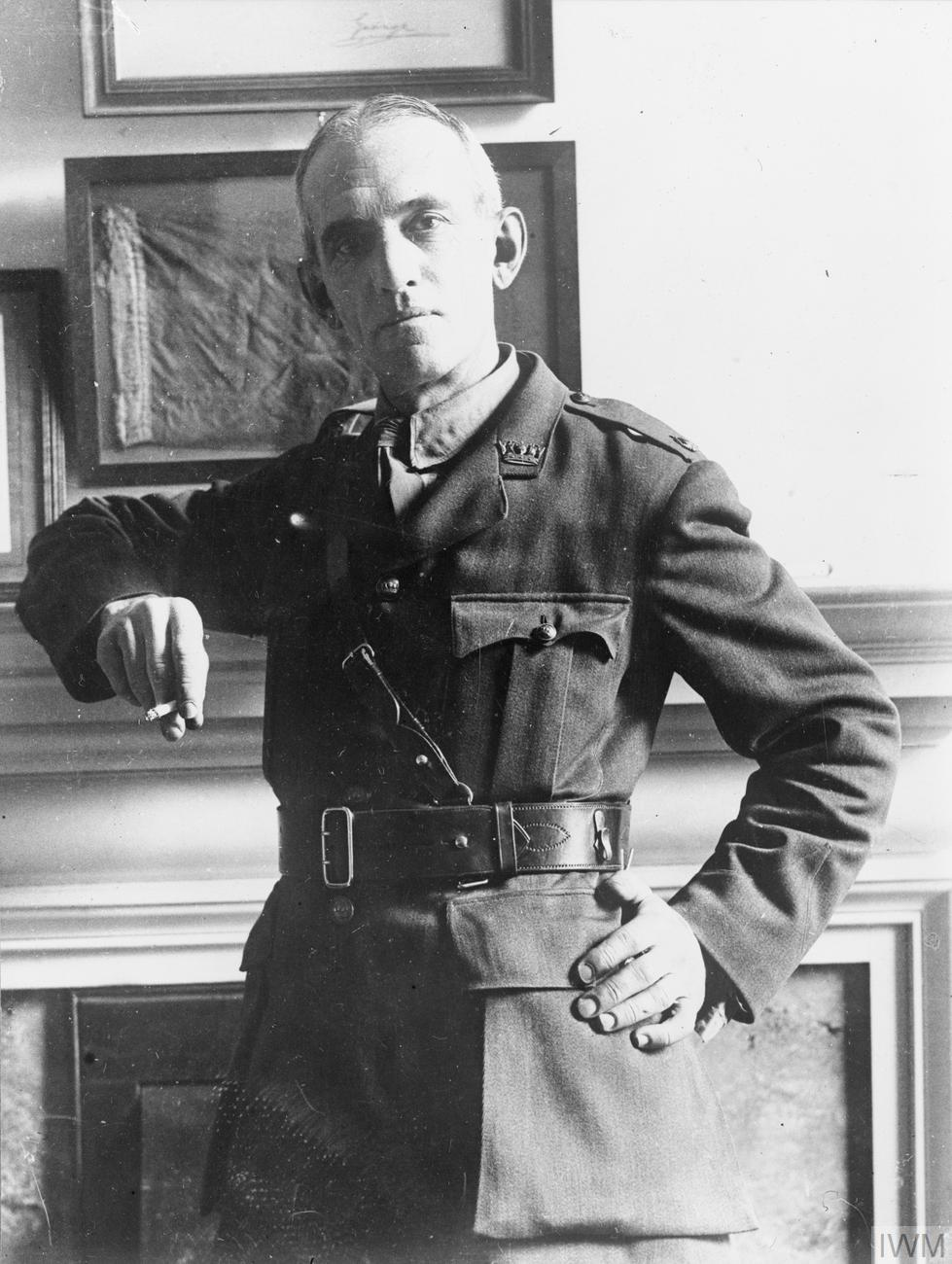

Charles John ffoulkes (1868–1947) was a British historian, and curator of the Royal Armouries at London. He was a younger son of the Reverend Edmund ffoulkes. He wrote extensively on medieval arms and armour.

He was selected as the Curator of the Armouries by his predecessor, Harold Arthur Lee-Dillon, and assumed the office on 1 January 1913.

He served in the First World War in the Royal Navy Volunteer Reserve. He was in command of a pom-pom gun on the roof of Gresham College in London when it was called into action against German Zeppelin bomber L13/LZ 45 on 8 September 1915.

He played an important role in the British Arts and Crafts movement, and was an acquaintance of William Morris.

He was subsequently first curator and secretary of the newly formed Imperial War Museum in London. In the 1925 Birthday Honours ffoulkes was appointed an Officer of the Order of the British Empire (OBE). He was appointed a Companion of the Order of the Bath (CB) in the 1934 New Year Honours.

His wife Maude Mary Chester ffoulkes (née Craven) (1871–1949) was a ghostwriter.

== Published works ==
- (1909) Armour and Weapons, Oxford: Clarendon Press; republished by Westholme Publishing, 2005 ISBN 1-59416-022-8
- (1912) The Armourer and His Craft, London: Methuen; republished by Dover, 1988 ISBN 0-486-25851-3
- (1930) The 'Dardanelles' Gun at the Tower
