= Charles Williams (priest) =

Welsh Anglican priest and university lecturer

- Born: 8 July 1906; Cardiff
- Died: 30 April 1962 (aged 55)

Charles Stephen Conway Williams (5 July 1906 – 30 April 1962) was a Welsh Anglican priest and university lecturer.

== Life ==
Williams, whose father was incumbent of St John the Evangelist Church, Cardiff, was educated at Clifton College and Jesus College, Oxford, where he held a Meyricke exhibition open to Welsh students. He obtained a first-class degree in theology and won the Junior Greek Testament Prize in 1929. He was ordained and served as a curate in Bristol and then as chaplain of Wells Theological College before returning to Oxford, as chaplain of Merton College, in 1932. He was also University Lecturer in the New Testament and published various books on the Old and New Testaments. Williams was thoroughly conversant with Classical Armenian. He became Senior Tutor of Merton in 1960. He died on 30 April 1962 at the age of 55.
