= Norman Matthews =

Norman Gregory Matthews (12 February 1904 – 6 August 1964) was a British Anglican clergyman and broadcaster. Born in Swansea, he spent his working life in Cardiff.

== Early life ==
Norman Matthews was born in Britain on 12 February 1904 at Swansea, and was educated in Swansea at the Bishop Gore School, before matriculating at the University of Oxford (Jesus College), where he held a Meyricke exhibition (scholarship). He graduated with a second-class Bachelor of Arts degree in Theology in 1926 (obtaining his MA in 1930).

== Career ==
After studying and training at St Stephen's House, Oxford, Matthews was ordained deacon in 1927, and priest in 1928.

From 1927 to 1935 he served as curate of St Dyfrig's church, Cardiff, before becoming the first Warden of St Teilo's Hall of Residence at Cardiff University, also serving as Llandaff Diocesan Missioner from 1936 to 1940.

From 1940 to 1953 he served as vicar of St Saviour's church, Roath, Cardiff - combining this with the post of chaplain to HM Prison Cardiff from 1940 to 1945. In 1946 he was also appointed as a canon of Llandaff Cathedral, and he became Chancellor of the diocese in 1952.

In 1953 he became rector of St Fagans.

He died at St. Fagans on 6 August 1964, and was buried in the graveyard of Llandaff cathedral.

== Other work ==
In addition to his parish work, he lectured on English literature and made frequent broadcasts; he was a panel member on the BBC show "The Brains Trust", and made a series of talks for BBC Radio, titled Lift Up Your Hearts (1958). He wrote extensively and served on the Liturgical Commission of the Church in Wales and the Central Committee for the Training of Ordinands.
