= John Hugh Jones =

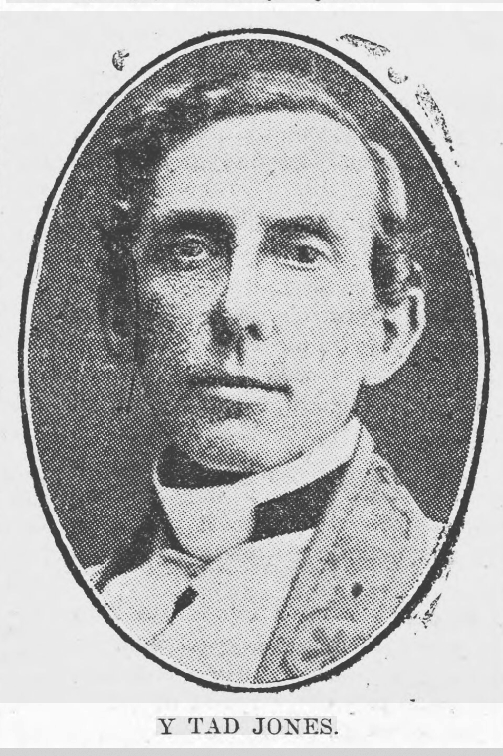
Fr Jones in 1908

John Hugh Jones (21 May 1843 – 15 December 1910) was a Welsh Roman Catholic priest, translator, and tutor.

== Life ==
Jones was born in May, 1843, in Bala, Gwynedd, north Wales. After an education at Bala Grammar School and some private tuition from the Anglican priest and antiquarian John Williams (Ab Ithel), he matriculated at Jesus College, Oxford in 1862. He did not complete his degree course, as he joined the Roman Catholic Church on 18 October 1865. He then studied at St. Edmund's Theological College in Ware, Hertfordshire and at St Beuno's Jesuit College in Tremeirchion, Denbighshire. He was ordained deacon and worked in Bangor, Gwynedd in 1871, preaching in both Welsh and English. He was then ordained priest in 1872 and served the town of Caernarvon until 1908, when he was moved to St Mary's College, Holywell, Flintshire as a tutor in Welsh. During his life, he translated into Welsh various religious writings, including hymns and a Prayer Book. He died in Holywell on 15 December 1910.
