= Tom Thomas =

Tom Thomas may refer to:

- Tom Thomas (baseball) (1873–1942), pitcher in Major League Baseball
- Tom Thomas (rugby league) (fl. 1900s), Welsh rugby league player
- Tom Thomas (priest) (1914–1999), Anglican dean of Melbourne
- Thomas Thomas (boxer) (1880–1911), known as Tom, Welsh boxer
- Tom Thomas (Fireman Sam), a character in Fireman Sam
- Tom Thomas, a character in The Fixies

== See also ==
- Tommy Thomas (disambiguation)
- Thomas Thomas (disambiguation)
