= Eric James (priest) =

Eric Arthur James FKC AKC (14 April 1925 – 1 May 2012) was an Anglican priest, Chaplain Extraordinary to HM the Queen, and for many years a regular participant in the "Thought for the Day" feature of BBC Radio 4's Today programme. He was associated with St Albans Cathedral for some years.

== Early life ==
James was born in Essex. He left Dagenham County High School in Dagenham, Essex, at fourteen, when the Second World War broke out, and worked for seven years at a riverside wharf on the Thames where the Globe Theatre now stands. After the war, he was accepted as a student by King's College London, where he studied theology, gaining Master of Arts and Bachelor of Divinity degrees.

== Career ==
After he was ordained he became Assistant Curate of St Stephen with St John, Westminster, from 1951 to 1955.

He was Chaplain of Trinity College, Cambridge from 1955 to 1959, and thereby became associated with some of the best known clerics of his generation: Mervyn Stockwood, John Robinson (author of the bestseller Honest to God), Robert Runcie, and Trevor Huddleston. He was Select Preacher from 1959–60 to the University of Cambridge.

From 1959 to 1964 he was Vicar of St George, Camberwell, and Warden of Trinity College Mission. From 1964 to 1969 he was Director of Parish and People. From 1964 to 1972 he was also Proctor in Convocation.

James was made Chaplain to the Queen in 1984 and was Preacher to Gray's Inn from 1978 to 1997, as well as Director of Christian Action from 1979 to 1990 and one of the people who inspired the 1985 Faith in the City report. He was Select Preacher from 1991 to 1992 to the University of Oxford, and was awarded the Lambeth degree of DD in 1993.

He was also the biographer of John Robinson, Bishop of Woolwich.

== Personal life ==
He lived in the London Charterhouse. He died on 1 May 2012.
