= Chaplain Extraordinary =

A chaplain in extraordinary was a chaplain appointed to the Household of the British crown. The term was most used under the Stuarts after the Restoration, in the 17th century, but lasted with decreasing importance into the 18th and 19th centuries.

Royal chaplains were part of the Ecclesiastical Household, part of the Royal Household. The positions were prestigious and sought after, such that there would be forty eight chaplains 'in waiting', i.e. actively serving the Chapel Royal, and each would serve for approximately a week of each month over the year. These were paid positions. Further to this were a number of chaplains 'in ordinary' who were considered to share the prestige of the role, but who were not allocated to serve the chapel for a designated week, although they might serve as additional chaplains, such as attending upon the sick in various other places. Additionally there were also 'chaplains in extraordinary'. These were unpaid sinecure positions, yet still desirable owing to their prestige.

== Holders of the office ==
Past holders of the office of chaplain in extraordinary to the Crown have included Henry Ferne (before 1660), Thomas Fuller (before 1660), Thomas Vane and Eric James. The position still exists today.
