= William David Davies =

Welsh minister and writer

William David Davies, often known as W. D. P. Davies, (18 January 1897 – 7 July 1969) was a Welsh Presbyterian minister and writer on theological topics. After becoming the first Welsh student to obtain a Bachelor of Divinity degree from the University of Oxford, he turned down an offer to become a theology tutor at Oxford, along with a college fellowship, preferring to become a Presbyterian minister. He wrote various theological works and was regarded as an excellent scholar as well as a powerful preacher.

== Life ==
Davies was the only son of a Presbyterian minister, Isaac Davies, and his wife. He was born in Glyn Ceiriog, Denbighshire, in north Wales but moved with his parents to Rhyd Ddu in Snowdonia, Bryn-rhos and Bangor, Caernarfonshire. Davies studied at the county school in Caernarfon and at the Friars School, Bangor before winning a scholarship to Jesus College, Oxford. During the First World War, he was a conscientious objector and carried out agricultural work on the Llŷn Peninsula, preaching in Pwllheli during this time. When the war was over, he returned to Oxford, obtaining second class Honour Moderations in Literae Humaniores and a first class Bachelor of Arts degree in theology. After further study, he obtained a Bachelor of Divinity degree, becoming the first Welsh non-conformist to be awarded the degree by the University of Oxford. He refused the offer of a fellowship and appointment as a tutor in theology at the university, since the terms of appointment included his becoming a member of the Church of England and Davies had by this time decided to become a Presbyterian minister.

Davies was regarded as a powerful preacher, as well as an excellent scholar. He was ordained in 1923 and ministered in London until 1926, before moving to Cardiff, where he served until 1928. In that year he was appointed Professor of the History of Religions and the Philosophy of Religion at the United Theological College Aberystwyth. His publications included works on religious topics: Cristnogaeth a meddwl yr oes (1932), Datblygiad Duw (1934), and a book on the Epistle to the Ephesians (1933). He resigned from the Theological College in 1933, after events showed that he was suffering from a disturbance of mind: he had a split personality for the rest of his life. He moved around, living in Neath and Machynlleth and in other places as a writer for the Welsh language newspaper Y Cymro. During this time, he wrote various essays and poems and began to call himself "W. D. P. Davies", saying that the "P" stood for "sinner" (Welsh: Pechadur), but it may have derived from his wife Margaret's maiden name (Palmer). He spent a few months in charge of the churches in Llangadfan, Montgomeryshire but this was not a success. He was given the opportunity to recover by the Ithon Road Presbyterian Church in Llandrindod Wells, where he died on 7 July 1969.
