= William Foulkes (priest) =

Welsh cleric and writer (died 1691)

William Foulkes (died 1691) was a seventeenth-century Welsh cleric and writer.

Foulkes was the son of a clergyman named John Foulkes, and was educated at Jesus College, Oxford, matriculating in 1650. He graduated in 1653, became rector of Cwm in Denbighshire in 1660, and rector of Llanfyllin and of Llanbrynmair in 1661, holding these positions until his death. He added the position of rector of Llanfihangel-yng-Ngwynfa after 1680. He was also appointed a canon of St Asaph in 1662. He helped to prepare Bishop George Griffith's Gweddi'r Arglwydd wedi ei hegluro (an exposition of the Lord's Prayer) for publication in 1685, and translated Bishop Thomas Ken's Practice of Divine Love into Welsh in 1688. He died in Llanfyllin in 1691, and was buried there on 9 January. His son, also called William, also attended Jesus College.
