= Morgan Owen =

Bishop of Llandaff, Wales (died 1645)

Morgan Owen (1584/5 – 1645) was bishop of Llandaff, Wales from 1639 but imprisoned and unable to exercise his charge from 1644. His Laudian views and the construction of the baroque south porch of St. Mary's University Church in Oxford (together with a statue of the Virgin and Child) precipitated his overthrow.

Owen was the son of a clergyman in Myddfai, Carmarthenshire. After education at the grammar school in Carmarthen, Owen attended Oxford University, matriculating from Jesus College on 16 December 1608 aged 23, before becoming chaplain of New College from where he graduated with a B.A. degree on 6 July 1613 before receiving his M.A. degree in June 1616 from Hart Hall.
