= David Thomas (Dewi Hefin) =

Welsh poet and teacher

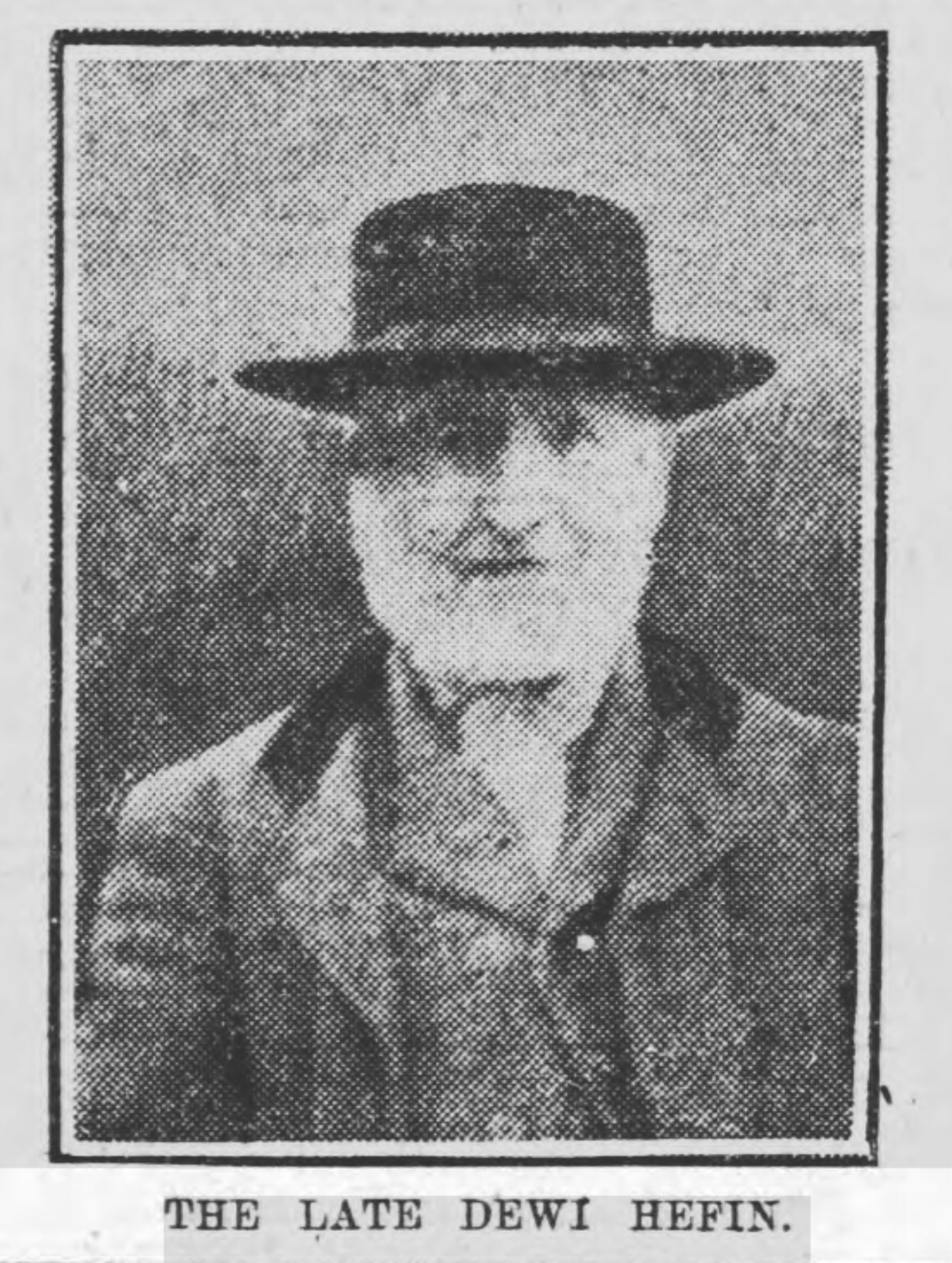
David Thomas Portrait

David Thomas (bardic name Dewi Hefin) (4 June 1828 – 9 March 1909) was a Welsh poet and teacher.

== Life ==
Thomas was born in Llanwenog, Cardiganshire, south Wales. He went to school in Cribyn and later ran schools in various places in Cardiganshire (Cribyn, Bwlch-y-fafda, Mydroilyn, Llanarth, Cwrtnewydd and Llanwnnen) until his retirement in 1883. His pupils in Cribyn included John Islan Jones, who went on to become a distinguished Unitarian minister and writer. His poems were published in four volumes: Y Blodau in 1854, Blodau Hefin in 1859, Blodau'r Awen in 1866, and Blodau Hefin in 1883.
