= T. Darrah Thomas =

American physicist and professor

- Born: Thomas Darrah Thomas; April 8, 1932
- Died: August 7, 2021 (aged 89)
- Education: B.S., Haverford College; Ph.D., University of California, Berkeley
- Scientific career
- Fields: Physical chemistry; Atomic physics; Molecular physics; Optical physics
- Workplaces: University of California, Berkeley; Brookhaven National Labs; Princeton University; Oregon State University

T. Darrah Thomas (April 8, 1932 - August 7, 2021) was a Distinguished Professor Emeritus in Chemistry at Oregon State University, and a Fellow of the American Physical Society

== Early life and education ==
Darrah Thomas, the son of Woodlief and Jean Darrah Thomas, was born in Glen Ridge, New Jersey, on April 8, 1932. After his mother died, his father remarried in 1935, and Darrah's family included his mother Frances, and sister Barbara. Darrah was reared in Chevy Chase, Maryland, and graduated from St. Albans School (Washington, D.C.) in 1950.

Darrah Thomas graduated from Haverford College with a Bachelor of Science in 1954, and he earned his Ph.D. at the University of California, Berkeley, in 1957 with his dissertation, Spallation-fission Competition from the Compound System U233 Plus He4, advised by Glenn T. Seaborg.

At Berkeley, he married Barbara Rassweiler in 1956.

== Career ==
From 1957–1959 Thomas served as Assistant Professor of Chemistry at Berkeley, and he then worked for Brookhaven National Labs from 1959–1961. He became Professor of Chemistry at Princeton University from 1961–1970. In 1971 he accepted a position as Professor of Chemistry at Oregon State University, in Corvallis, Oregon, where researched both physical chemistry and also atomic, molecular and optical physics.

Thomas served from 1981–1985 as Chair of the Chemistry department at OSU, and he was Director of the Center for Advanced Materials Research from 1986–1991. His more recent research involved photoelectron-recoil-induced vibrational, rotational excitation in high-energy photoelectron spectroscopy, and X-ray Photoelectron Spectroscopy (XPS).

== Selected publications ==
- Thomas, T. Darrah (1959-11-01). "Cross Section for Compound-Nucleus Formation in Heavy-Ion-Induced Reactions". Physical Review. 116 (3). American Physical Society: 703–712. doi:10.1103/PhysRev.116.703.
- Darrah Thomas, T.; Weightman, Peter (1986-04-15). "Valence electronic structure of AuZn and AuMg alloys derived from a new way of analyzing Auger-parameter shifts". Physical Review B. 33 (8). American Physical Society: 5406–5413. doi:10.1103/PhysRevB.33.5406.
- Thomas, T.Darrah; Shaw, Robert W. (Jan 1974). "Accurate core ionization potentials and photoelectron kinetic energies for light elements". Journal of Electron Spectroscopy and Related Phenomena. 5 (1): 1081–1094. doi:10.1016/0368-2048(74)85066-8.
- Thomas, T. Darrah (1984-02-06). "Transition from Adiabatic to Sudden Excitation of Core Electrons". Physical Review Letters. 52 (6). American Physical Society: 417–420. doi:10.1103/PhysRevLett.52.417.
- Sæthre, Leif J.; Berrah, Nora; Bozek, John D.; Børve, Knut J.; Carroll, Thomas X.; Kukk, Edwin; Gard, Gary L.; Winter, Rolf; Thomas, T. Darrah (2001-10-31). "Chemical Insights from High-Resolution X-ray Photoelectron Spectroscopy and ab Initio Theory: Propyne, Trifluoropropyne, and Ethynylsulfur Pentafluoride". Journal of the American Chemical Society. 123 (43): 10729–10737. doi:10.1021/ja016395j. ISSN 0002-7863.
- Coville, Mary; Thomas, T. Darrah (1991-06-01). "Molecular effects on inner-shell lifetimes: Possible test of the one-center model of Auger decay". Physical Review A. 43 (11). American Physical Society: 6053–6056. doi:10.1103/PhysRevA.43.6053.

== Awards, honors ==
- 1985 Fellow of the American Physical Society, cited "For his insightful contribution to the understanding of subtle phenomena in atoms, molecules, and nuclei, and his lucid explanations of those phenomena.
- 1997 Distinguished Professor Emeritus, Oregon State University.
