= Evan Lewis (priest) =

Welsh Anglican clergyman (1818–1901)

Evan Lewis (16 November 1818 – 24 November 1901) was a Welsh clergyman who was Dean of Bangor Cathedral from 1884 until his death.

== Life ==
Lewis was born in Llanilar, Ceredigion, and named after his father who had died before Lewis was born. He was raised by his mother Mary, daughter of John Richards. Lewis was educated at the grammar schools in Ystrad Meurig and Aberystwyth, as well as at a school in Twickenham run by his father's brother. He then followed his brother (David Lewis) to Jesus College, Oxford, matriculating on 7 April 1838. He obtained his B.A degree in 1841 and his M.A. in 1863. Whilst at college, he rowed at stroke in the college boat when it was Head of the River.

He was ordained deacon and priest in 1842 by the Bishop of Bangor, Christopher Bethell. He held a succession of church positions. He was curate of various churches on Anglesey – Llanddeusant (1842–43), Llanfaes with Penmon (1843–45), Llanfihangel Ysgeifiog (1845–46) – before becoming curate of Llanllechid in Caernarfonshire in 1847. He left this position in 1859 to become vicar of Aberdare in Glamorgan, returning to North Wales in 1866 as rector of Dolgellau, Merionethshire, remaining until 1884. During this time, he was also rural dean of Ystumanner (1866–84), chancellor of Bangor Cathedral (1872–76) and canon residentiary (1877–84). In 1884, he was appointed as Dean of the cathedral, and held this position until his death, in the Deanery, on 24 November 1901. He was buried in the churchyard at Llandegai, Caernarfonshire, near to the grave of Bishop Bethell.

== Religious views ==
Lewis and his brother David were both influenced by the Tractarian movement whilst studying at Oxford. David was John Henry Newman's curate and converted with him to Roman Catholicism. Evan Lewis did not convert, but preached Tractarian views and practices in Wales. When this led to controversy, he defended his position in letters (in Welsh) in Y Cymro, which were later published in book format. A Welsh-language treatise on the apostolic succession, Yr olyniaeth apostolaidd gan offeiriad Cymreig (1851), was his main work, although he also wrote on other issues, translated hymns into Welsh and helped with the creation of a hymn book for the Bangor diocese.

== Family ==
Lewis was twice married. He married first, in 1859, Anne Cotton, younger daughter of Very Rev. James Cotton, who was at the time Dean of Bangor. After her early death the following year, he remarried in 1865 Adelaide Owen Morrall, daughter of Rev. Cyrus Morrall, of Plasyolyn, Shropshire. They had three sons and three daughters.
