= Thomas Llewellyn Thomas =

Thomas Llewellyn Thomas (generally known as Llewellyn Thomas) (14 November 1840 – 12 May 1897) was a Welsh Anglican clergyman and scholar of the Welsh language. He wrote poems in English, Latin and Welsh and worked on a Basque translation of the Old Testament. He was a Fellow of Jesus College, Oxford for twenty-five years, including fifteen years as Vice-Principal, but failed to be elected Principal in 1895, losing out to John Rhys.

== Life ==
Thomas was the eldest son of Canon Thomas Thomas, known as "Thomas of Caernarfon" where he was the vicar for twenty-four years. Thomas was born at the vicarage in Caernarfon on 14 November 1840 and was privately educated until he was nine. After further schooling, including attendance a Welsh-language Sunday School, Thomas matriculated at Oxford University in October 1860, becoming a scholar of Jesus College. He won the Newdigate prize in 1863 for an English-language poem about coal mines, and was praised by Matthew Arnold. He was placed in the second class in Classical Moderations and obtained a third-class Bachelor of Arts degree in Literae Humaniores in 1865. His Master of Arts degree followed in 1868. He spent some time as a teacher, at Rossall School, Llandovery College (for two years) and Ruthin School (for five years). He was ordained deacon in 1867, and was ordained priest by Thomas Short, the Bishop of St Asaph, in the following year. He served as a curate in Llanrhaeadr (1867–1870), Llanfwrog (1870–1871) and Ruabon (1872). In 1880, he was later appointed by Jesus College as rector of Nutfield, Surrey, a position he held for two years. He was appointed as a canon of St Asaph's Cathedral in 1897, but died before he was installed.

In 1872, Thomas was elected to a fellowship at Jesus College, which he retained until his death in 1897. He was a noted linguist: as well as winning (and later judging) the Newdigate prize, he won a prize at the National Eisteddfod in Ruthin for a Welsh-language poem, "The Harpist's Grave" (with music composed by Brinley Richards) and also delivered the University's Latin sermon. He could compose poems in English, Welsh or Latin without difficulty. He also mastered the Basque language, and edited an edition of the Old Testament in Basque. He was the college's Welsh reader, and supported the establishment of a university professorship of Celtic. He wrote a chapter about the history of Jesus College for Colleges of Oxford (1891). He also championed the college's links with Wales, promoting the use of scholarships for poor students from Wales and supporting the Meyrick Trust. As well as being a popular tutor, he served as senior tutor and vice-principal of the college, standing in for Daniel Harper as Principal from 1887 to 1895 during Harper's illness. He did, however, strictly enforce discipline, on one occasion forbidding undergraduates to take beer into the Junior Common Room, which led to a delegation of students (led by Alfred Hazel, a future Principal of the college) visiting Thomas to protest. Thomas hoped to succeed Harper as Principal, but instead the position went to John Rhys, who had become the university's first professor of Celtic. The 1895 election to the principalship developed into a battle between the "church element" and the "non-conformist element", and Rhys (a non-conformist) came out on top.

He contracted pneumonia in May 1897, dying on 12 May at the age of fifty-seven. He was buried in Llanbeblig cemetery, Caernarfon, alongside his father, after a Welsh-language choral funeral service.
