= John Thomas (priest, born 1736) =

John Thomas (22 October 1736 – 27 March 1769) was a Welsh Anglican priest and antiquarian.

== Life ==
Thomas was born in Ynyscynhaearn, Caernarfonshire, in north Wales, on 22 October 1736. After studying at the Friars School in Bangor, he went to the University of Oxford, matriculating as a member of Jesus College in 1755. He was ordained in 1760 and became a curate in Holyhead, Anglesey. He did so after spending some time as the under-keeper of the museum in Oxford before finding that his wages were inadequate to match his drinking. In 1761, Thomas became usher at his old school, Friars, thereby also becoming curate of Llandygai. In 1766, he was appointed as deputy to the master of Beaumaris grammar school, with curacies in Llansadwrn and Llandegfan. He died on 27 March 1769 and was buried in Llandegfan.

Thomas was well respected by his contemporaries as a scholar of Welsh and as an antiquarian. He copied old Welsh language manuscripts, but his collection was dispersed after the death of his brother (Richard Thomas) who inherited them. He was the author of the anonymously-written History of the Island of Anglesey (1775). His genealogical account of the Penrhyn and Cochwillan families was used by William Williams in his 1802 Observations on the Snowdon Mountains.
