= Robert Wynne (Chancellor of St Asaph) =

Welsh cleric and academic

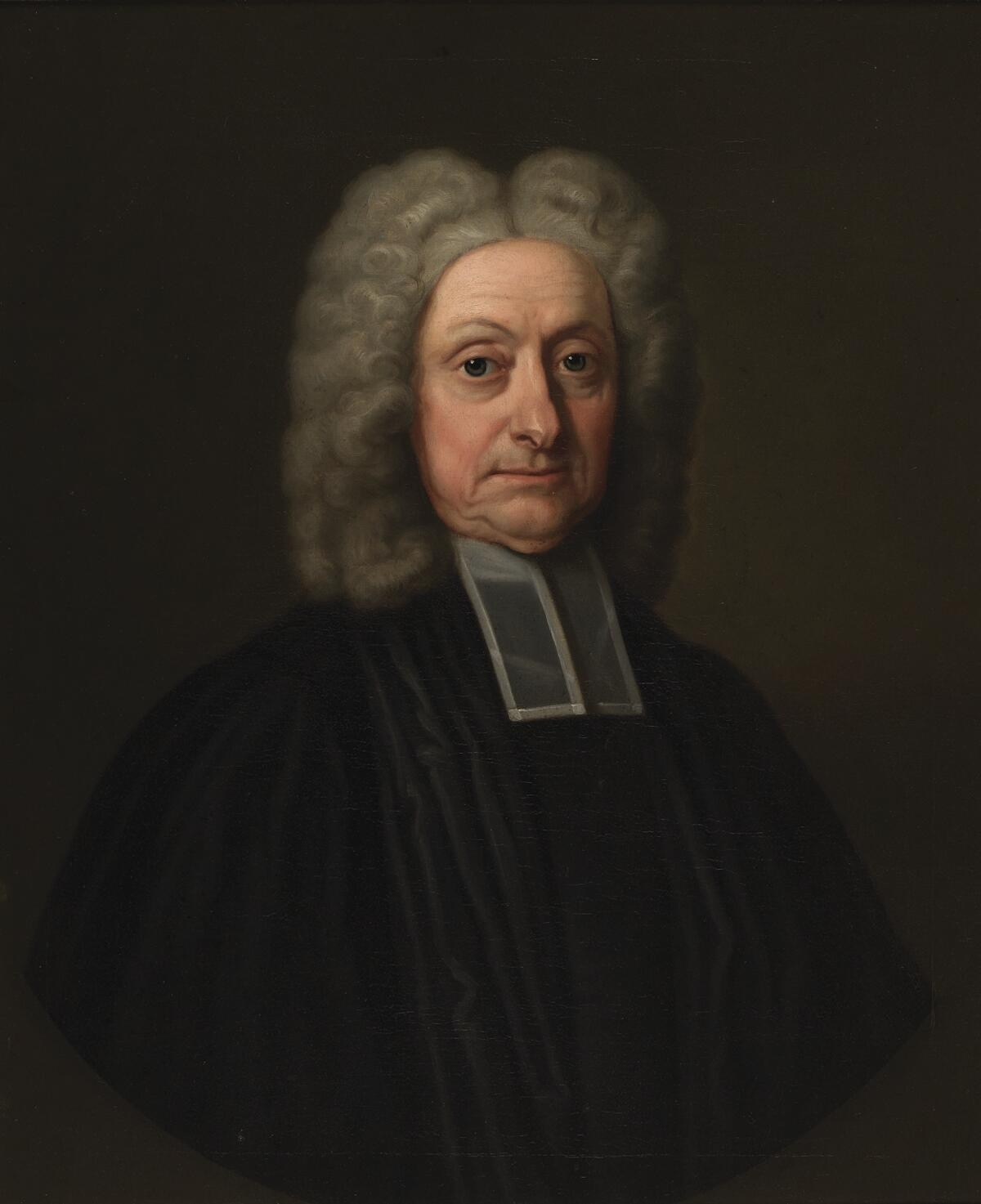

Robert Wynne (c. 1661 – 1743) was a Welsh cleric and academic.

== Life ==
Wynne, from Llanfawr, Caernarvonshire, was the eldest son of Robert Wynne (a canon of Bangor Cathedral and rector of Llanddeiniolen and Llaniestyn) and his wife Catherine Madryn, heiress of Llannerch Fawr). The youngest son of that marriage was William Wynne. Robert Wynne (the younger) was educated at Jesus College, Oxford, as his father and brother had been. He matriculated on 9 March 1677 at the age of 16, and took his Bachelor of Arts degree in 1680. He became a Fellow of the college in 1681, and held this position until 1691. He obtained a Master of Arts degree in 1691, a Bachelor of Divinity degree in 1691 and a Doctor of Divinity degree in 1695.

After his ordination, he became vicar of Gresford in 1690. In the following year, he became rector of Llanfyllin, Montgomeryshire and of Llanuwchlyn, Merionethshire, later becoming vicar of Gwyddelwern (1702) and of Llandanwg (1711), both also in Merionethshire. In 1719, he was appointed to the sinecure position of rector of Llansanffraid-ym-Mechain, Montgomeryshire. From 1690 until his death in 1743, he was chancellor of the diocese of St Asaph, in succession to his uncle, Hugh Wynne. He became a canon of St Asaph's Cathedral in 1691 and chancellor of the cathedral in 1693. During his life, he was a supporter of the Society for the Promotion of Christian Knowledge and of the charity school movement.
