= Daniel Lewis Lloyd =

Welsh schoolteacher and cleric

Daniel Lewis Lloyd (23 November 1843 – 4 August 1899) was a schoolteacher and cleric.

Born in Llanarth, Ceredigion, Wales, Lloyd was educated at Lampeter College School and Jesus College, Oxford. He was, successively, the headmaster at Dolgelley Grammar School (1867–1872), Friars School, Bangor (1872–1878) and Christ College, Brecon (1878–1890). He was then appointed Bishop of Bangor, (1890–1898), the first Welsh-speaking bishop there for over 200 years.

Lloyd died in Llanarth, Cardiganshire aged 55 and is buried in St David's churchyard, Llanarth. He had married Elizabeth Margaret Lewis, daughter of the Reverend D. Lewis of Trawsfynydd; they had three daughters.

Bishop Lloyd also had two sons. D.R.L.Lloyd and Lt.Col H.C.L.Lloyd.

Religious titles
Preceded by James Colquhoun Campbell	Bishop of Bangor; 1890–1899	Succeeded by Watkin Williams
