= James L. Vincent =

James L. "Jim" Vincent (1940 – December 5, 2013) was the chairman and CEO of Biogen Idec from 1985 to 2002. He graduated from Duke University's Pratt School of Engineering in 1961 with a Bachelor of Science degree, and received an MBA from the Wharton School of Business at the University of Pennsylvania in 1963. He was a member of the board of directors of Alnylam Pharmaceuticals and served as a trustee of Duke University for 12 years. He had two children, Aimee (Vincent) Jamison and Christopher Vincent.

Vincent is credited with decisions leading to the financial stability and success of Biogen in the late 1980s and early 1990s.

== Early career ==
Prior to working in the healthcare industry, Vincent held senior positions at Texas Instruments in Europe and Japan. From Texas Instruments, he joined Abbott Laboratories, as the founding president of its Human Diagnostics Division. He eventually rose to president and chief operating officer of Abbott. He then became the president of Allied Health and Scientific Products.

== Biogen turnaround ==
In 1985, he left Allied to take the president and CEO role of Biogen. Biogen, having raised and spent vast sums of money in the early 1980s without delivering a stream of revenue-generating product, was "teetering on the brink, with mounting losses and no way to raise more money," when he joined.

Vincent's initial steps were to focus the company, reduce expenses, and gain the cash needed to turn the company around. These steps included eliminating 85% of existing scientific projects and shrinking headcount from 500 to 225 to cut expenses. He also raised $65 million in 1986 and renegotiated licensing contracts Biogen had in place with other pharma companies.

With a viable burn-rate in place enabling Biogen to survive, Vincent built and executive team and focused on developing Hirulog and Avonex. Ultimately, the company developed, manufactured and marketed Avonex as a leading therapy for multiple sclerosis. Avonex was introduced in 1996, and is used for treatment of relapsing forms of multiple sclerosis. It is the first drug to have proven, in a blinded clinical trial, that it slows the progression of disability as well as reduces the frequency of exacerbations.

== Board affiliations ==
Vincent was a member of the board of Alnylam Pharmaceuticals and the Committee for Economic Development, as well as a former director of the Millipore Corporation, Curagen Corporation, Continental Bank of Illinois (now Bank of America), and Idexx Corporation. He served as a Trustee of Duke University and was a member of the boards of the University of Pennsylvania Medical Center and Wharton School of Business and Finance.

He was also a past board member of the Biotechnology Industry Organization (BIO) and the Pharmaceutical Research Manufacturers of America (PhRMA).
