= David Charles (minister) =

British minister (1812–1878)

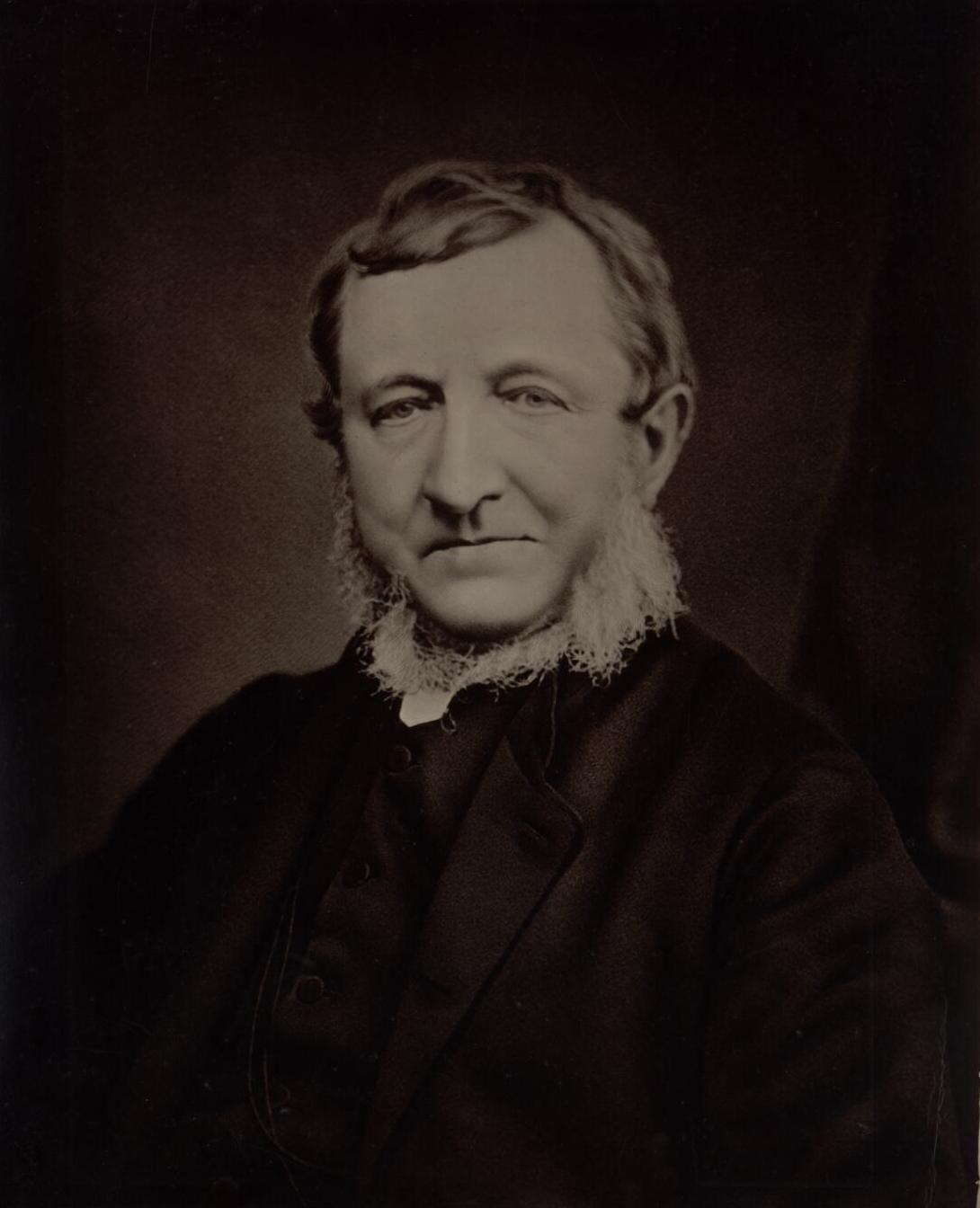
Photograph of David Charles

David Charles (23 July 1812 – 13 December 1878) was a Welsh Calvinistic Methodist cleric and educator, who was one of the men behind the foundation of the University College of Wales, Aberystwyth.

== Life ==
Charles was the son of a linen draper and grandson of the prominent Methodist Thomas Charles. He was born in Bala, Merionethshire, Wales, and educated by a local Anglican rector (the Reverend J. Lloyd), which led to his continuing his education at Jesus College, Oxford, matriculating in 1831 and graduating in 1835. During his time at Oxford, he lived in the same rooms in Jesus College as his grandfather had when he studied there. Charles remained uninfluenced by the Tractarians, and instead rediscovered his family Methodist affiliations in preference to the Anglicanism he had acquired from Lloyd. He returned to Bala and opened a preparatory school for Calvinistic ministers with his brother-in-law, Lewis Edwards, in 1837. In 1842, he became principal of Trevecca College, Brecknock and remained in position for 20 years, encouraging his students to obtain degrees from the University of London before returning to Wales to preach. Students however disliked his overbearing attitude. He left in 1863 after a dispute, causing the college to close for three years, and was appointed as the pastor of the church in Abercarn, Monmouthshire through the influence of Lord Llanover and his wife Lady Llanover.

Hugh Owen appointed Charles as secretary of the University for Wales movement in 1868, in succession to Thomas Nicholas. He attracted support and donations from lower-class subscribers, in comparison to the approach taken by Nicholas, but this raised little and the efforts of others were needed to keep the scheme going. Charles was annoyed not to be appointed as the first principal of the University College of Wales, Aberystwyth—the position going to his nephew, Thomas Charles Edwards, in 1872—and he resigned, settling in Aberdyfi. He died there on 13 December 1878, and was buried at Llanidloes.
