= Wells Theological College =

Coordinates: 51°12′40″N 2°38′38″W

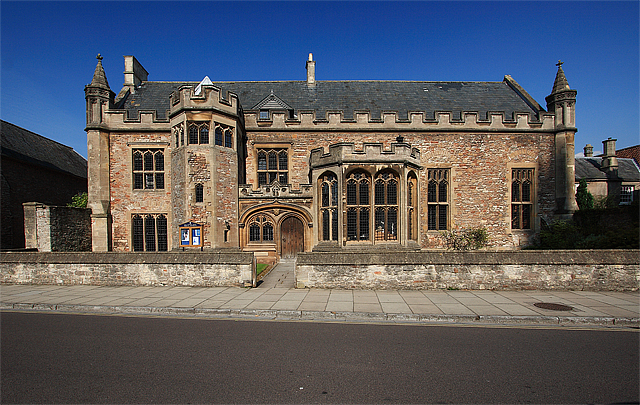
Former library of the college, now the Music School and Concert Hall of the Wells Cathedral School

Wells Theological College began operation in 1840 within the Cathedral Close of Wells Cathedral. It was one of several new colleges created in the nineteenth century to cater not just for non-graduates, but for graduates from the old universities who wished to receive specialist clerical training in preparation for ordination into the Church of England. It was founded by Bishop Law.

In 1971 it merged with Salisbury Theological College, the students moved to Salisbury, and the new institution became known as the Salisbury & Wells Theological College, now Sarum College.

== Education ==
The first principal of the college was John Hothersal Pinder who had held a similar position at Codrington College, Barbados. He remained at Wells until about 1865 when he resigned on account of infirmity. Under his leadership the college became known as a 'desirable place for training ordinands'. At the same time the college was criticised for its tractarian tendencies.

In 1884 the tuition fees were £30 per annum, or £10 per term. There were lodgings for 30 students, and since its founding 898 students had been admitted. All except 30 had taken university degrees. At that time graduates studied for one year, non-graduates for two. Their studies included Holy Scriptures, Book of Common Prayer, the Articles, ecclesiastical history, Hebrew and pastoral theology. They attended many chapel services and had the opportunity of performing parochial work.

== Buildings ==
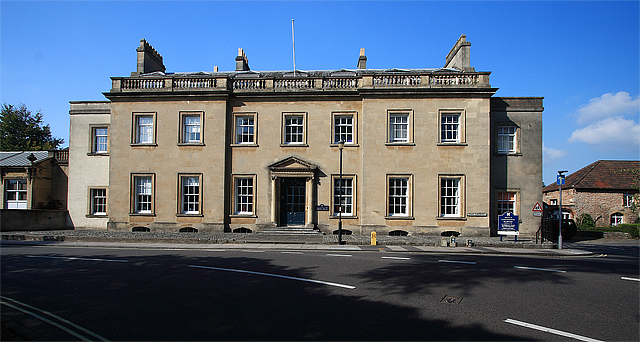
The Cedars

A guide book of 1862 notes that the students were using the Vicars' Hall as a library, but in 1896 they purchased a nearby building for this purpose on Cathedral Green. Rebuilt in the 15th century for Archdeacon Holes, it was still used as a house in 1555 when Canon Polydore Vergil surrendered it to the Crown. In the late 18th century it became a brewery, but was extensively restored 1886. It is now a Grade II* Listed Building and is the Music School and Concert Hall of the Wells Cathedral School.

The college acquired the lease of the chapel in Vicars' Close in 1875. The Cedars, a house built in 1758 for MP Charles Tudway, was leased by the Trustees of the Theological College in 1919 for use as a hostel for some of the students.

== Notable alumni ==
- Peter Ball, convicted sex offender and former bishop
- Henry Montgomery Campbell, bishop
- Douglas Russell Feaver
- Noel Debroy Jones
- Walter Kenrick Knight-Adkin
- Alfred Merle Norman
- Ronald Ragsdale Sargison
- J. Spencer Trimingham
- John Stevens Waller

== Notable staff ==
- Edgar Charles Sumner Gibson, chaplain, then vice-principal.
- Christopher Hollis, vice-principal.
- George Arthur Hollis, principal.
- Gordon Mursell, tutor.
- Richard Godfrey Parsons, principal (1911–16).
- John Alexander Ramsbotham, vice-principal.
- John Robinson, chaplain (1948–51).
- Charles Williams, chaplain.

== See also ==
- Central churchmanship
