= Richard Thomas (priest) =

Richard Thomas (10 December 1753 – 1780) was a Welsh Anglican priest and antiquarian.

== Life ==
Thomas, who was the younger brother of the priest and antiquarian John Thomas, was born on 10 December 1753 in Ynyscynhaearn, Caernarfonshire, north Wales. Like his elder brother, he studied at the Friars School and Jesus College, Oxford before being ordained. His brother John died in 1769, bequeathing him his collection of manuscripts; the manuscripts were used by the editors of the Myvyrian Archaiology of Wales. Some of his genealogical manuscripts were sold to the College of Heralds.

Thomas obtained his BA degree in 1775 and was curate in Llanegryn, Merionethshire, in late 1777, where he was also the schoolmaster. From there, he was able to reach the library at Peniarth, which contained a number of important manuscripts; he said in a letter to the antiquarian Owen Jones in 1778 that he had been asked to make a catalogue of the contents of the library. He died in 1780 in Ruthin, having been the curate there since at least 1779.
