= Thomas Richard Lloyd =

British priest

Thomas Richard Lloyd (1820 – 10 May 1891) was a Welsh Anglican priest, who spent his entire ministry in one parish, and eisteddfod participant.

Lloyd was born in Denbigh, Wales, and studied at Ruthin School and Jesus College, Oxford. He was ordained deacon in 1843, the year he obtained his Bachelor of Arts degree from Oxford, and ordained priest the following year. He was appointed as curate of Llanfynydd, Carmarthenshire, Wales in the parish of Hope, Flintshire in 1843 and became rector in 1845. He served the parish until his death on 10 May 1891, advocating abstinence, and participating in eisteddfods as a member of the gorsedd; his bardic name was Yr Estyn.
