= John Islan Jones =

John Islan Jones (17 February 1874 – 28 May 1968) was a Welsh Unitarian minister, academic and writer.

== Life ==
Jones was born on 17 February 1874 in Cardiganshire, south Wales. He was educated locally in Cribyn and Llanwnnen, studying with the poet David Thomas ("Dewi Hefin") until he was about 10 years old. He then worked as a farm servant and a stonemason until 1896, when he attended a school in Cribyn run by a Unitarian minister called David Evans, leaving in 1898 with a scholarship to Jesus College, Oxford.

After graduating in 1901, he transferred to Manchester College, Oxford to study for ordination. He won a scholarship to Marburg University and Jena University, but illness meant that he had to leave Germany before his doctorate was complete.

He was a Unitarian minister in Accrington from 1906 to 1909, Bolton from 1909 to 1917 and Hindley from 1917 to 1939. He then retired to Wales, but was asked in 1945 to become Principal of Carmarthen Presbyterian College, a post he held until 1948. His writings included A brief history of the Unitarian Church, Accrington (1909), Egwyddorion yr Undodiaid (1948), and a prize-winning volume of reminiscences, Yr hen amser gynt (1958). He died on 28 May 1968.
