= David Lewis (priest, born 1814) =

David Lewis (1814–1895) was a Welsh Anglican priest and academic who converted to Roman Catholicism under the influence of John Henry Newman.

== Life ==
Lewis was born in Ceredigion, Wales, and educated at Jesus College, Oxford, from 1834 onwards, graduating in 1837. He then became a Fellow of the college in 1839, a position he held until 1846 (serving as vice-principal 1845–46). After his ordination, he was curate of St Mary's Church under John Henry Newman, and was part of the Oxford Movement, converting to Catholicism in 1846. He later settled in Arundel and studied canon law. He translated The Rise and Growth of the Anglican Schism by Nicholas Sanders from Latin (1877) and writings of St John of the Cross from Spanish (1864).

His younger brother, Evan Lewis, was also influenced by the Oxford Movement but did not convert. He later became Dean of Bangor Cathedral.
