= William Wynne (historian) =

Welsh historian

William Wynne (c. 1671 – May 1704) was a Welsh historian.

== Life ==
Wynne was the youngest son of Robert Wynne (a canon of Bangor Cathedral and rector of Llanddeiniolen and Llaniestyn) and his wife Catherine Madryn, heiress of Llannerch Fawr. William Wynne's eldest brother was Robert Wynne. William Wynne was born before 12 November 1671 and educated at Jesus College, Oxford (like his father and elder brother). He matriculated in March 1688 and took his Bachelor of Arts degree in 1691. He became a Fellow of the college in 1692, and held this position until his death in 1704. After ordination, he became rector of Llanfachraeth, Anglesey, but appears not to have resided there. Whilst at Oxford, he was part of the circle of Edward Lhuyd, the Welsh naturalist, botanist, linguist, geographer and antiquary. Wynne's publications included a History of Wales (1697), which was essentially a new version of David Powel's 1584 work The Historie of Cambria, now called Wales. Wynne's version, which was reprinted in 1702 (unchanged), 1774 and 1812 (with changes each time), and in 1832 (with topographical notes), was the starting point in English on medieval Welsh history for nearly two hundred years.
