= William Thomas (chancellor of Llandaff Cathedral) =

Welsh Anglican priest and academic (1734–1799)

William Thomas (1734 – 3 September 1799) was a Welsh clergyman and academic, who was a Fellow of Pembroke College, Oxford, and later chancellor of Llandaff Cathedral.

== Life ==
Thomas was born to Lewis and Eleanor Thomas of Eglwys Nynnid, near Margam, south Wales, and christened on 26 August 1734. After schooling in Cowbridge, he attended the University of Oxford, matriculating from Jesus College, Oxford in 1751 and obtaining degrees of BA and MA from Oriel College, Oxford in 1755 and 1758 respectively. He was ordained deacon in 1758 and priest in 1759, before being presented to the living of Aberavon with Baglan and Briton Ferry; he was later the priest of Llangynwyd with Baiden and the curate of Llangeinor. He nevertheless lived mainly in Oxford after 1760, and was a Fellow and tutor of Pembroke College, Oxford; he was regarded as a good scholar of Celtic and Oriental languages. He was later chaplain to Lord Vernon, who had presented him to his earliest parish posts, and was appointed as chancellor of Llandaff Cathedral in 1777. He was also a friend and encourager of the poet Evan Evans. Thomas died in 1799.
