= Thomas Vane =

English Anglican priest and Catholic convert

Thomas Vane (born 1599/1600) was an English priest who, having been appointed Chaplain Extraordinary to King Charles I, later converted to Roman Catholicism.

== Life ==
Vane was born in Kent. He matriculated at Jesus College, Oxford on 26 April 1616, aged 16, then transferred to Christ's College, Cambridge (B.A 1620, M.A. 1623, D.D. 1640). Having taken Anglican orders when he was ordained deacon and priest in Peterborough in April 1621, he was made chaplain extraordinary to Charles I and rector of Crayford in 1626. On becoming a Catholic, he resigned these preferments, and went with his wife to Paris, where he practised as a physician, taking the degree of M.D. there or at some other foreign university. At Paris he wrote an account of his conversion, the preface being dated 4 August 1642, which was published in 1643 under the title, A Lost Sheep returned Home: or the Motives of the Conversion of Thomas Vane. It was dedicated to Charles's Catholic queen, Henrietta Maria. This book ran through several editions and was answered by the Anglican writer Edward Chisenhall (1653). He also wrote An answer to a libel written by D. Cosens against the great Generall Councell of Laterane under Pope Innocent III (Paris, 1646), and Wisdome and Innocence or Prudence and Simplicity in the examples of the Serpent and the Dove, propounded by our Lord (s.l. 1652).

The date and place of Vane's death are unknown.
