= Edmund Ffoulkes =

British clergyman (1819 – 1894)

Edmund Salusbury Ffoulkes (or Edmund Salisbury Ffoulkes, 12 January 1819 – 19 April 1894) was a British clergyman who converted from Anglicanism to Catholicism and back again. He was Church of England vicar of Oxford's University Church of St Mary the Virgin, from 1878 until his death.

== Biography ==
Ffoulkes was the son of John Powell Foulkes and Caroline Mary Jocelyn. His father was heir to the Eriviat Hall estate which the ffoulkes family had owned since at least the 16th century. He was christened on 21 January 1819 at Henllan, Denbighshire.

Ffoulkes was educated at Shrewsbury School and Jesus College, Oxford. His uncle Henry Foulkes was principal of the college from 1817 to 1857. He obtained a second-class degree in literae humaniores in 1841. He became a Fellow of Jesus College in 1843, holding this position until 1855. He was ordained as a priest in the Church of England and also served for a time as the college's junior bursar. He joined the Roman Catholic Church in 1855. However, after fifteen years in the Catholic Church, he applied to his bishop, Samuel Wilberforce, to be reinstated as a clergyman in the Church of England, and his request was granted. Jesus College appointed him as rector of Wigginton, Oxfordshire, in 1876. When the position of vicar of the University Church of St Mary the Virgin in Oxford became vacant in 1878, no fellow of Oriel College wished to accept the appointment and the position was then offered to Ffoulkes, who had previously assisted at services. He remained vicar of St Mary's until his death. He was succeeded by Cosmo Gordon Lang, later Archbishop of Canterbury. The church had almost ceased to function but Lang rebuilt the congregation.

Ffoulkes wrote several theological works, including Christendom's Divisions, The Church's Creed or the Crown's Creed, and The Primitive Consecration of the Eucharistic Oblation. His final work was A History of the Church of S. Mary the Virgin, Oxford. He also lectured in Divinity to the non-collegiate students at Oxford.

In 1860 Ffoulkes married Annie, youngest daughter of Thomas Andrew Lumisden Strange, Chief Justice of Madras. His younger son was the historian Charles ffoulkes.
