= James Vincent (priest, born 1718) =

Welsh priest (1718–1783)

James Vincent (1718–1783) was a Welsh Anglican priest and schoolmaster.

== Life ==
Vincent was the son of Thomas Vincent, a priest who served as vicar of Bangor, Gwynedd and as rector of Llanfachraeth, Anglesey (both in north Wales). He matriculated at Jesus College, Oxford in 1735, obtaining a Bachelor of Arts degree in 1739 and a Master of Arts degree in 1742. He was ordained and became master of the Friars School, in Bangor, as well as serving as vicar of Bangor, rector of the Caernarfonshire parish of Llandwrog and (from 1763) the rector of Llanfachraeth. He died in 1783. One of his grandsons was the priest and academic James Vincent Vincent.
