= Thomas Thomas (priest) =

Welsh Anglican clergyman (1804–1877)

Thomas Thomas (7 September 1804 – 9 January 1877) was a Welsh Anglican clergyman. He was noted for his parish ministry in Caernarfon, particularly for his educational work in building schools and helping to found the North Wales Training College.

== Life ==
Thomas Thomas was born on 7 September 1804, the son of John Thomas of Llanfihangel-y-Creuddyn. After being educated at Ystrad Meurig, he studied at the University of Oxford, matriculating as a member of Jesus College on 29 March 1824 and obtaining a Bachelor of Arts degree in 1827. He then spent a year teaching in Liverpool before being ordained deacon by John Luxmoore, Bishop of St Asaph, on 20 July 1828. He spent three years as a curate in Llanfair Caereinion, during which time he was ordained priest (on 26 July 1829). He then served as the curate of Ruabon.

His longest period of parish ministry was spent as vicar of Llanbeblig with Caernarfon; the position carried the name of the older foundation first, although Caernarfon was the larger of the two places. He was appointed to the position by John Bird Sumner, Bishop of Chester, on 14 April 1835, and stayed there until 1859. He became known as "Thomas of Caernarfon" and was noted for his pastoral work in a town that suffered from poverty and outbreaks of cholera. He helped to establish schools in Caernarfon and assisted with the foundation of the North Wales Training College, a teacher-training college that later became St Mary's College, Bangor. (The college later merged with the education department of what is now called Bangor University.)

In 1859, Thomas was appointed to Ruabon again, this time as vicar, and he spent three years there before moving to Llanrhaeadr-yng-Nghinmeirch, Denbighshire, in 1862. In 1864 he was appointed a canon of Bangor Cathedral. He died on 9 January 1877 in Llanrhaeadr-yng-Nghinmeirch, and was buried in the cemetery of the church in Llanbeblig. A pulpit in the church was erected in his memory. Thomas was married and had five sons and three daughters. His eldest son, Thomas Llewellyn Thomas, was a priest and a noted scholar of the Welsh language. He died in 1897 and was buried in Llanbeblig cemetery, alongside his father.
