= James Vincent (priest, born 1792) =

Welsh Anglican priest (1792–1876)

James Vincent Vincent (born James Vincent Jones) (4 October 1792 – 22 March 1876) was a Welsh cleric who became Dean of Bangor Cathedral, holding the position for 14 years.

== Life ==
Vincent was the grandson of James Vincent (who was vicar of Bangor, Gwynedd, and Master of Friars School, Bangor). Vincent was educated at Jesus College, Oxford, matriculating in 1811, obtaining a B.A. degree in 1815 and an M.A. degree in 1817. He was a Fellow of the College from 1816 to 1824. In 1820, he assumed his mother's surname of Vincent with the permission of King George IV. After his ordination, he became curate of Beaumaris, Anglesey, and then rector of Llanfairfechan from 1834 to 1862. He was then appointed Dean of Bangor Cathedral, a post that he held until his death in the Deanery on 22 March 1876.
