= Ysgol y Berwyn =

School in Gwynedd, Wales

Coordinates: 52.9128°N 3.5984°W

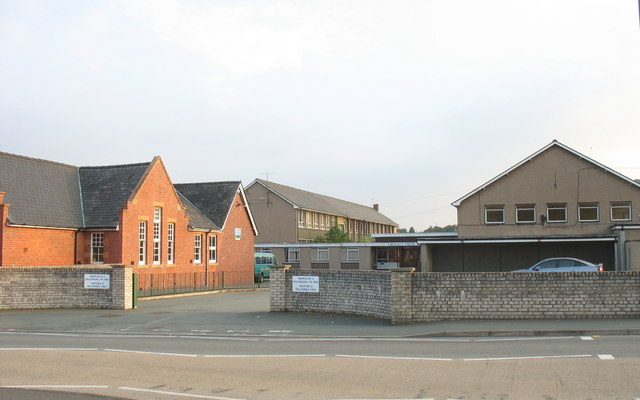
Entrance to Ysgol y Berwyn

Ysgol y Berwyn was a high-school situated in the town of Bala, in Gwynedd, north Wales.

According to the 2013 Estyn report, 79% of pupils were from Welsh-speaking homes.

In 2017, 80% of pupils achieved 5 or more GCSEs at grades A*-C.

In September 2019, Ysgol y Berwyn closed and a new 3-19-year-old school opened on site under the name 'Ysgol Godre'r Berwyn' ("School of the foothills of the Berwyn").

== History ==
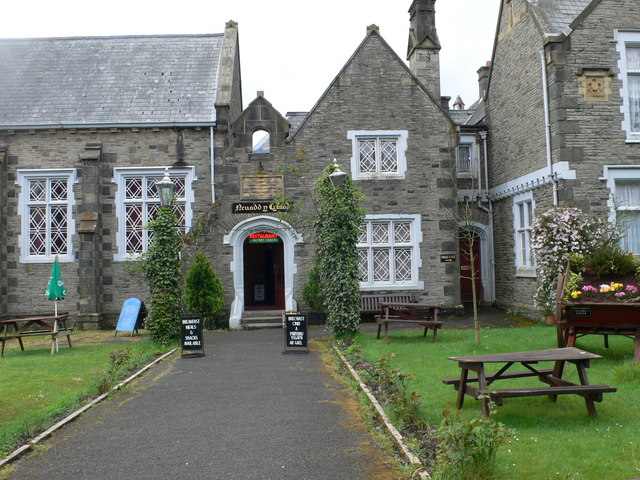
Neuadd y Cyfnod, Bala

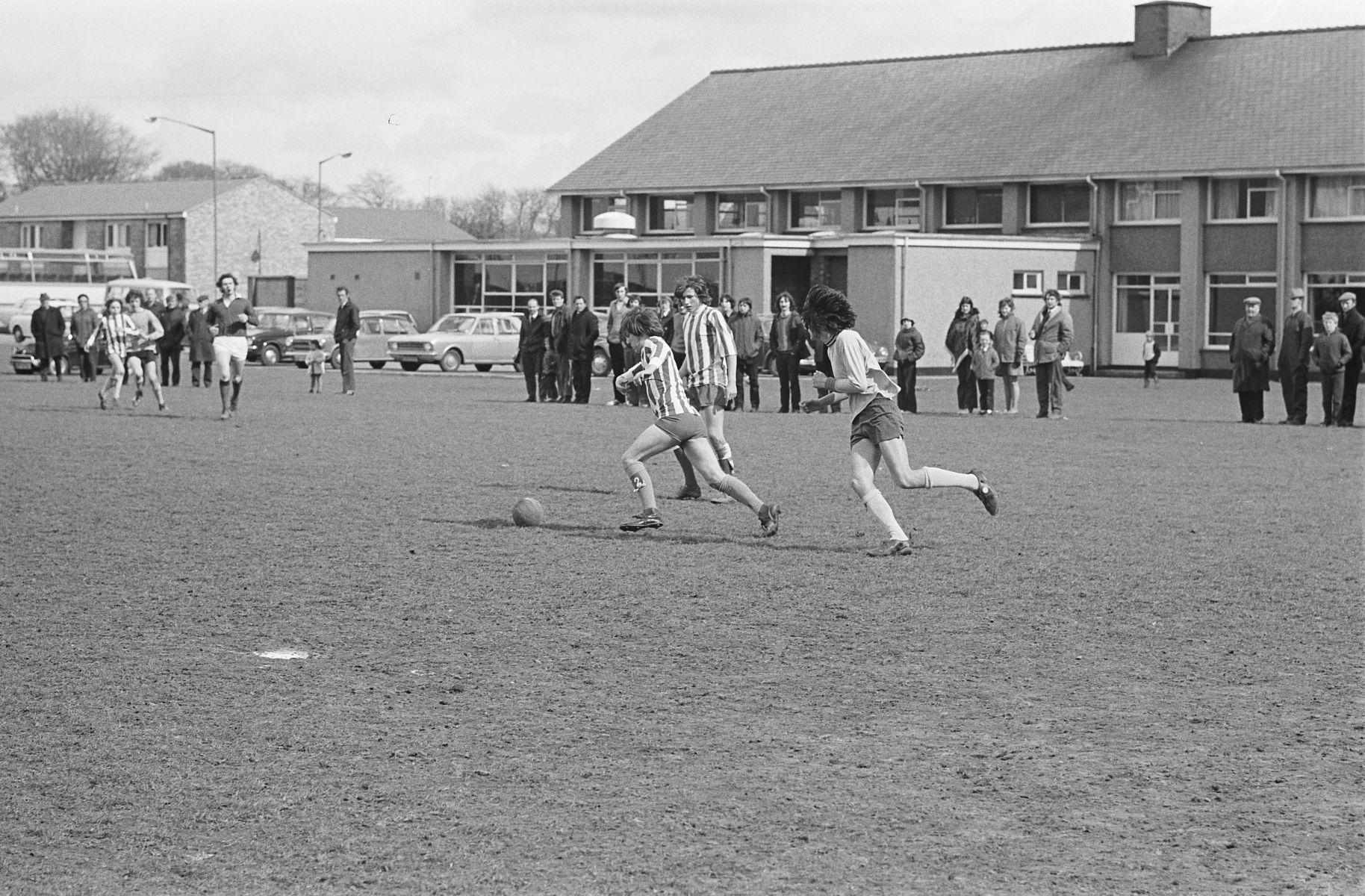
Ysgol y Berwyn in 1973

The Rev. Edmund Meyricke founded a free grammar school at Bala, at Ty-Tan Domen, in 1713/14 by instructions in his will. A new building was constructed in 1851 (Neuadd y Cyfnod) and modelled very much on Jesus College, its financial and academic patron.

The grammar school was replaced by the new Ysgol Y Berwyn in 1964; the modern school has a strong connection with Bangor University.

In 2015 Gwynedd Council gave the go ahead for a new school to be built on the site, with £10 million to be invested in an improved library, a community cinema and better sports facilities. The new school, Ysgol Godre'r Berwyn, opened in September 2019 and had its official opening ceremony on 8 November.
