= Edmund Meyrick =

Welsh cleric

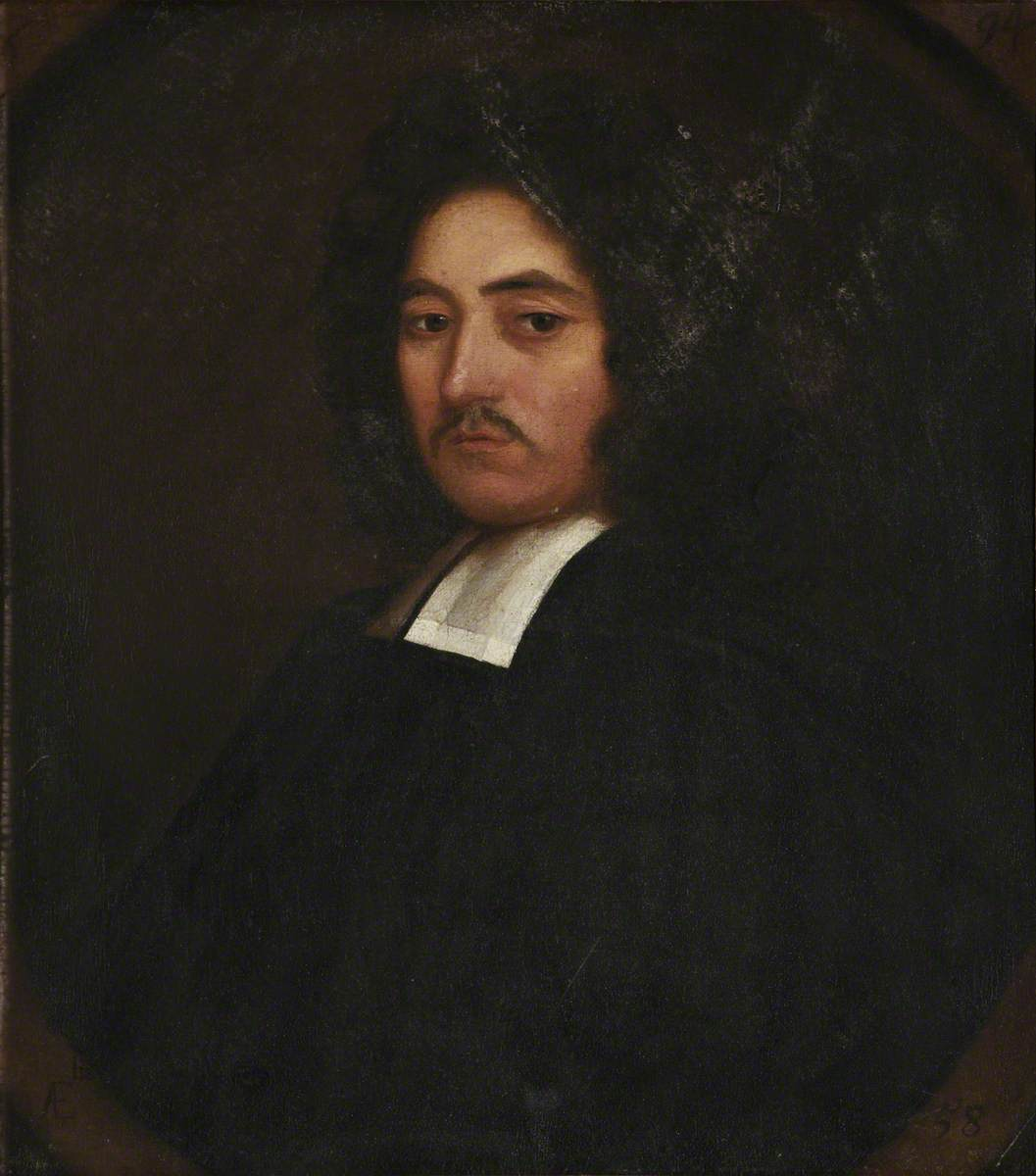
Edmund Meyrick (1636 – 24 April 1713)

Edmund (or Edmond) Meyrick (or Meyricke) (1636 – 24 April 1713) was a Welsh cleric and benefactor of Jesus College, Oxford, where scholarships are still awarded in his name. He is a member of the Meyrick family.

== Life ==
Meyrick was born at Garthlwyd, Llandderfel (near Bala, Merionethshire) and christened in Llandderfel on 11 June 1636. He attended four schools, including one year at Ruthin School, before matriculating at Jesus College, Oxford in 1656. He was elected to a scholarship in 1658 and obtained his BA degree in 1659. He was ordained both deacon and priest by Robert Skinner, Bishop of Oxford, on 30 August 1660 in the chapel of New College, Oxford. In 1662, he was elected to a probationary Fellowship of the college, but married in 1663 and became ineligible for a full fellowship. He became vicar of Eynsham on 10 August 1663. He was chaplain to Richard, Earl of Carbery — the Meyricks and the Carberys being related – and this connection led to Meyrick's appointment to a number of lucrative positions in West Wales. Meyrick became vicar of Llangathen in 1665, vicar of Llanegwad and a Canon of St David's Cathedral in 1667, rector of Burton, Pembrokeshire in 1670, treasurer of St David's in 1690 and rector of Penboyr in 1713. He was also a canon of Christ College, Brecon and vicar of Carmarthen; he held many of these positions at the same time. He died in Carmarthen, where he was then living, on 24 April 1713, and was buried in St Peter's Church; a memorial to him was placed on the north wall of the chancel.

== Bequests ==
Meyrick's wife and only child had predeceased him, enabling a more generous disposition of his assets. He had extensive property interests, in both North and South Wales. The family seat was in Ucheldre, Gwyddelwern, Merionethshire and Meyrick also owned several houses in Carmarthen. In 1708, he set up a charity school in Carmarthen but for some reason directed in his will that the school and master should be moved to Bala, where it became Bala Grammar School. The will provided for an annual payment of £15 to the schoolmaster together with the use of the schoolhouse, and £15 per year for clothing for the students.

His will, dated 25 March 1712, said:

I always intended to bestow a good part of what God should please to bless me with for the encouragement of learning in Jesus College, in Oxford."

He left family property in Denbighshire and Merionethshire, as well as his Carmarthen property after expiration of some life interests, to the college to provide six scholarships of £10 and six exhibitions of £8. The scholarships and exhibitions were to be awarded to Jesus College students from North Wales, until they obtained their Master of Arts degree or were receiving more than £40 per year from a parish appointment. Any surplus was to be used to buy advowsons so that the College might present one of the scholars (or in default of a suitable scholar, a Meyrick exhibitioner or a North Wales fellow of the College) to a parish position. Whilst the estate produced a surplus, only one living was purchased by the trustees, that of the rectory of Llandow in 1735. Further increases in the surplus led to an increase in payments to Bala School and to the scholars and exhibitioners, and to the purchase of other property in Cheltenham and Carmarthen. This proved to be a profitable investment since, by 1840, the college had received more than £10,000 through the sale of trust land near Cheltenham for railway purposes. Payments to Bala School ended in 1862, when the annual payments were commuted for a lump-sum payment of £5,333.

Meyrick scholarships and exhibitions are still awarded to students at Jesus College, based on academic merit. Students performing consistently at a first-class standard during the year in the opinion of their tutors may be awarded a Meyrick scholarship, with consistent performance at upper second to first-class standard potentially leading to the award of a Meyrick exhibition. The restriction in Meyrick's bequest that the scholarships were for students from North Wales only was relaxed in 1857 to cover students from all of Wales and Monmouthshire. The restrictions have been further relaxed and students who were not born in Wales are also now eligible for a Meyrick scholarship or exhibition if they are the child of a native of Wales, are able to speak Welsh or they were educated for the last three years of secondary school in Wales.
