= List of academics of the University of Wales, Lampeter =

University of Wales, Lampeter, originally known as St David's College and later St David's University College, was the oldest degree-awarding institution in Wales. It was founded in 1822 by Thomas Burgess, Bishop of St Davids, and given its royal charter by George IV in 1828.

The college was originally intended for the teaching of Welsh male clergy, and as a result maintained a number of Professors of Theology and Latin. It later began teaching a wide ranger of subjects, including Archaeology, Classics, English, Hebrew, Welsh, and Philosophy. In 1965, the college began accepting female students for the first time. It was renamed St David's University College in 1971 after joining the federal University of Wales, and in 1996 renamed again to University of Wales, Lampeter. In 2010, the college merged with Trinity University College to form the University of Wales Trinity Saint David.

This list includes those who worked as lecturers, readers, professors, fellows, and researchers at University of Wales, Lampeter. Those who were academics of the university as well as alumni are included on the list of alumni of University of Wales, Lampeter. Those who were academics of the university as well as Principals or Vice-Chancellors are included on the list of vice-chancellors of the University of Wales, Trinity Saint David.

== Archaeology ==
Name	Position	Notes	Ref
Michael Shanks	Head of Archaeology (1996–1998)	Teaching fellow in Archaeology (1992–1993), and Lecturer in Archaeology (1993–1996)	
Julian Thomas	Lecturer in Archaeology (1987–1993)		
Alex Woolf	Lecturer in Archaeology (1995–1997)		

== Classics ==
Name	Position	Notes	Ref
Thomas Iorwerth Ellis (1899–1970)	Lecturer in Classics (1940–1941)		
Harold Arthur Harris (1910–1974)	Professor of Classics		

== English ==
Name	Position	Notes	Ref
Dic Edwards	Senior Lecturer in Creative Writing (until 2019)		
Leslie Griffiths	Assistant Lecturer in Medieval English, (-1967)		
Hugh Walker (1855–1939)	Professor of English (1890–1939)		

== Geography ==
Name	Position	Notes	Ref
Tim Cresswell (born 1965)	Lecturer in Geography (c. 1996)		
John A. Dawson	Reader in Geography (1981–1983)	Lecturer in Geography (1971–1974), Senior Lecturer in Geography (1974–1981)	
Chris Philo	Lecturer in Geography (1989–1995)		
Nigel Thrift	Lecturer in Geography		

== History ==
Name	Position	Notes	Ref
Janet Burton	Professor of Medieval History, (2006-)		
Thomas Tout (1855–1929)	Professor of History (1881–1890)		
Nigel Yates (1944–2009)	Professor of Ecclesiastical History (2005–2008)	Senior research fellow at the University of Wales (2000)	

== Languages ==
Name	Position	Notes	Ref
Charles Edmondes (1838–1893)	Professor of Latin (1865–1881)	Principal (1888–1892)	
Reginald H. Fuller (1915–2007)	Lecturer in Hebrew (1950–1955)		
John Owen (1854–1926)	Professor of Welsh (1879–1885)	Principal (1892–1897)	
Meirion Pennar (1944–2010)	Lecturer in Welsh (1975–1994)		
Rice Rees (1804–1839)	Lecturer in Welsh	Librarian	
John Rowlands (1938-2015)			
Daniel Silvan Evans (1818–1903)	Lecturer in Welsh (1847–1848)	Examiner in Welsh (1873). Studied at St David's College (1846–1847), awarded honorary BD (1868)	
Evan Thomas (1872–1953)	Professor of Welsh (1903–1915)	Established a Welsh library	
Laurie Thompson (1938–2015)	Head of the School of Modern Languages (1991–1995)	Head of Swedish (from 1983), then retired (1997); part-time lecturer (until 2000)	
George Woosung Wade (1858–1941)	Chair of Latin (1888–1932)		
Rowland Williams (1817–1870)	Professor of Hebrew (1850–1862)	Vice-principal (1850–1862)	

== Mathematics ==
Name	Position	Notes	Ref
John Cayo Evans (1879–1958)	Professor of Mathematics		

== Philosophy ==
Name	Position	Notes	Ref
Donald Caird (1925–2017)	Lecturer in Philosophy		
Islwyn Davies	Lecturer in Philosophy		
Raymond Renowden (1923–2000)	Head of the School of Philosophy (1957–1971)	Lecturer in Philosophy (1955–1969), Senior lecturer in Philosophy and Theology (1969–1971). Awarded a 1st in Theology at St David's College	

== Theology ==
Name	Position	Notes	Ref
Paul Badham	Professor of Theology and Religious Studies (1991–present)		
David Bartlett (1970-1977)	Lecturer in theology (1923-1931); Professor of Hebrew and Theology (1946-1950)		
Jonathan Campbell	Lecturer in Jewish Studies (1990–1996)		
Dan Cohn-Sherbok	Professor of Jewish Theology (c. 2006)		
Mary Grey	Professor of Pastoral Theology		
William Henry Harris (1884–1956)	Professor of Theology (from 1940)	Lecturer in Theology (1919–1940), and Professor of Welsh (from 1941). Awarded a 1st in BA Welsh from St David's College (1910), also English and Welsh (Creaton) Essay Prizeman, and Treharne and Senior Scholar	
Edwin Morris (1894-1971)	Professor of Hebrew and Theology (1924-1945)		
Benjamin Vaughan (1917-2003)	Lecturer in Theology (1952-1955)		

== Other ==
Name	Position	Notes	Ref
Harold Browne (1811-1891)	Vice-Principal (1843-1849)		
Islwyn Ffowc Elis (1924–2004)	Lecturer and reader (1975–1988)	Awarded a DLitt from the University of Wales in retirement	
Francis Jayne (1845-1921)	Principal (1879-1886)		
Maurice Jones (1863-1957)	Principal (1923-1938)		
Llewelyn Lewellin (1798-1878)	Principal (1826-1878)		
John Lloyd Thomas (1908-1984)	Principal (1953-1975)		
Alfred Ollivant (1798-1882)	Vice-Principal (1827-1843)		
John Perowne (1823-1904)	Vice-Principal (1862-1872)		
Keith Robbins (1940-2019)	Vice-Chancellor (1992-2003)		
Herbert Edward Ryle (1856-1925)	Principal (1886-1888)		

== See also ==
- List of vice-chancellors of the University of Wales, Trinity Saint David
- List of alumni of University of Wales, Lampeter
