= List of alumni of the University of Wales, Lampeter =

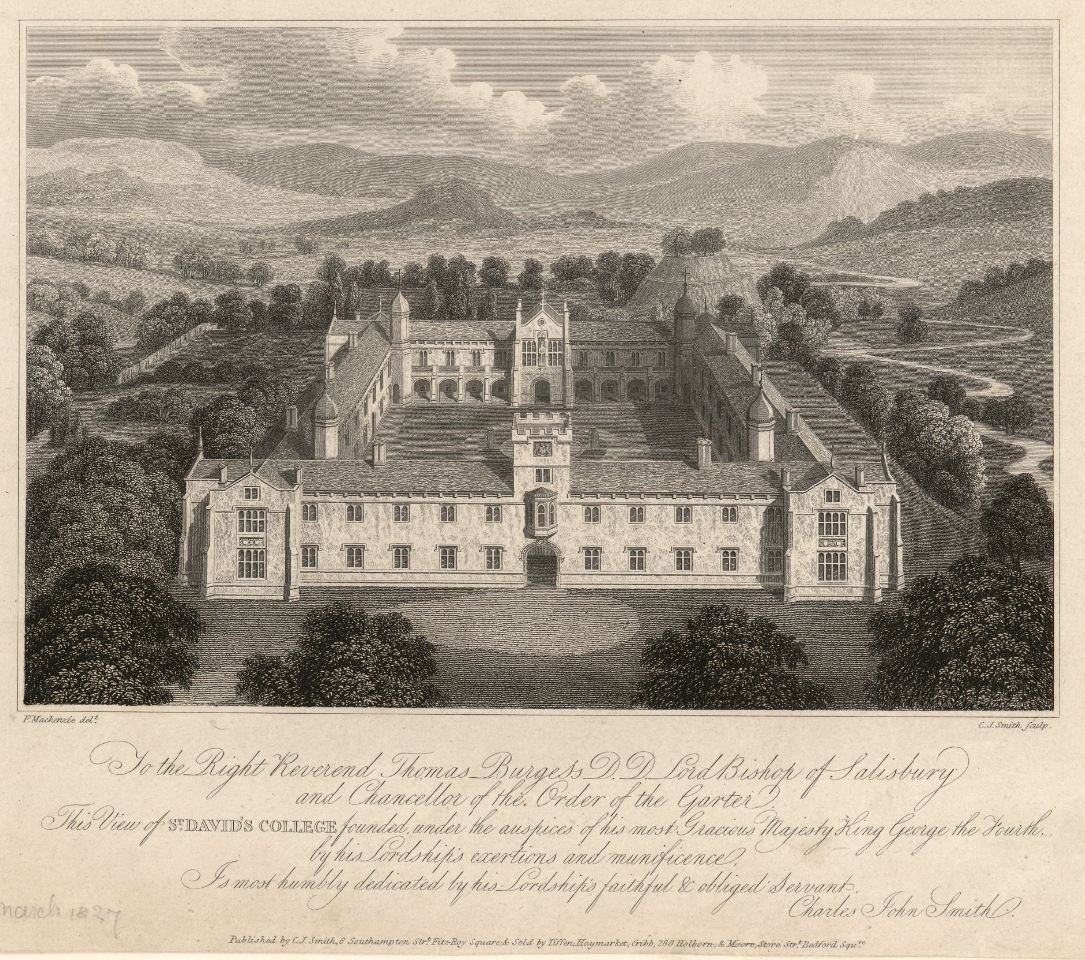
Engraving of St David's College, c. 1835

University of Wales, Lampeter, originally known as St David's College and later St David's University College, was the oldest degree-awarding institution in Wales. Its alumni include politicians, bishops, writers, activists, and academics. It was founded in 1822 by Thomas Burgess, Bishop of St Davids, and given its royal charter by George IV in 1828. The college was originally intended for the teaching of Welsh male clergy, with a 1927 report estimating that 66% of Welsh clergy had received some amount of training in Lampeter. It later began teaching a range of subjects.

From the world of clergy, the college's alumni include at least seven Archdeacons (George Austin, Carl Cooper, Owen Evans, Judy French, John Griffiths, John Holliman and Lawrence Thomas), several bishops, and two Archbishops of Wales (Edwin Morris and Alwyn Rice Jones). The list of educators includes a President of Washington & Jefferson College (John C. Knapp) and a Vice-Chancellor of Edge Hill University (John Cater). Academics who studied at the college went on to teach at University College Cork (Graham Allen), (Siobhán Dowling Long), Oxford Brookes University (William Gibson), Wuhan University (James R. Lewis), and St David's College itself (William Henry Harris, Dic Edwards and Daniel Silvan Evans). The list of alumni also includes one member of the Senedd (Rhodri Glyn Thomas), a founding member of the Social Democratic Party (Sue Slipman), a polar explorer (Hannah McKeand), and several writers and poets (Ian Marchant, E. A. Markham, Adrian Mourby, Peter Paphides and Fred Secombe).

In 1965, the college began accepting female students for the first time. It was renamed St David's University College in 1971 after joining the federal University of Wales, and in 1996 renamed again to University of Wales, Lampeter. In 2010, the college merged with Trinity University College to form the University of Wales Trinity Saint David.

== Alumni ==
Abbreviations used in the following table

- E – Year of enrolment at St David's College/University of Wales
- G – Year of graduation/conclusion of study at St David's College/University of Wales
- ? – Year or degree unknown

Degree abbreviations
- BA – Bachelor of Arts
- BD – Bachelor of Divinity
- LTh – Licentiate of Theology
- MA – Master of Arts
- PhD – Doctor of Philosophy
- DLitt – Doctor of Letters

=== Clergy ===
Name	E	G	Degree	Notes	Ref
George Austin	?	?	Philosophy	Archdeacon of York (1988–1999)	
David Bartlett	?	?	Theology	Bishop of St Asaph, (1950-1970)	
Dewi Bridges	?	?	?	Bishop of Swansea and Brecon (1988–1999)	
John Cawston	?	?	?	Chaplain of the Fleet for the Royal Navy (1876–1882)	
Carl Cooper	?	?	BA French	Bishop of St Davids (2002–2008), and Archdeacon of Merioneth (2000–2002)	
Dorrien Davies	?	1995	?	Archdeacon of Carmarthen (2017-2023), and Bishop of St Davids (2023-)	
Ellis Davies	1892	1895	?	Priest and antiquarian	
Ivor Evans	?	1922	?	Bishop in Argentina and Eastern South America with the Falkland Islands, (1946-1962)	
Evan Thomas Davies	?	1869	?	Vicar of Llanfihangel Ysgeifiog (1906–1913)	
Roy Davies	?	1955	BA Welsh	Bishop of Llandaff (1985–1999)	
Eric Evans	?	?	?	Dean of St Paul's Cathedral, (1988-1996)	
John Silas Evans	?	1885	BD (1885), Phillips and Treharne Scholar, Welsh and Science prize winner	Vicar of St Asaph (1895–1901), Fellow of the Royal Astronomical Society (1923), and member of St David's College council (1927–1939)	
Owen Evans	?	1898	BA	Archdeacon of Bangor (1921–1937)	
Richard Fenwick	?	1966	BA	Bishop of St Helena, (2011-2018)	
Judy French	?	?	BA Theology	Archdeacon of Dorchester (2014–present)	
Alexander Goldwyer Lewis	?	1871	Classics	Archdeacon of Bombay (1890-1896)	
Kerry Goulstone	?	?	?	Dean of St Asaph (1993–2001)	
Ellis Griffith	?	?	BA	Rector of Llangadwaladr (1899–1917), and vicar of Welshpool	
John Griffiths	?	?	?	Archdeacon of Llandaff (1877–1897)	
Christopher Herbert	?	?	?	Bishop of St Albans (1996–2009)	
John Holdsworth	?	1992	PhD	Executive archdeacon of Cyprus and the Gulf, (2010-2019)	
John Holliman	?	1967	BA (1965), LTh (1967)	Archdeacon of the Army and Deputy-Chaplain general to the British Armed Forces	
Joshua Hughes	?	1868	BD	Bishop of St Asaph (1870–1889)	
Idris Jones	?	1964	?	Bishop of Glasgow and Galloway (1998-2009); Primus of the Scottish Episcopal Church (2006-2009)	
Isaac Jones	1834	1836	Eldon Hebrew scholar (1835)	Curate of Llanedwen and Llanddaniel Fab (1840–1850), and translator of English works into Welsh	
Noël Jones	?	?	?	Bishop of Sodor and Man (1989–2003)	
Brian Lucas	1959	1962	BA in Humanities	Chaplain-in-chief (RAF) and Archdeacon for the Royal Air Force, (1991-1995)	
Alan Morgan	?	?	Philosophy and history	Bishop of Sherwood (1989-2004)	
Richard Williams Morgan	?	?	?	Curate of Mochdre (1842–1853)	
Edwin Morris	?	1922	Theology	Bishop of Monmouth and Archbishop of Wales	
Thomas Milville Raven	?	?	?	Priest and pioneering photographer	
Timothy Rees	?	1896	BA	Bishop of Llandaff (1931–1939)	
Raymond Renowden	1941	?	Theology	Dean of St Asaph, (1971-1992)	
Alwyn Rice Jones	?	1955	BA Welsh	Bishop of St Asaph (1981–1999), and Archbishop of Wales (1991–1999)	
John Roberts	?	?	BA	Missionary in the Bahamas and Wyoming	
Edward Shotter	?	?	Theology	Dean of Rochester, (1989-2003)	
Thomas James Stretch	1934	?	?	Army chaplain	
David Thomas	?	?	?	Vicar of Mynydd Llandygai (1860–1894)	
Harry Thomas	?	?	?	Bishop of Taunton (1945-1955)	
John Lloyd Thomas	1927	?	History	Principal of St David's College (1953-1975)	
Lawrence Thomas	?	1911	BD (2nd)	Archdeacon of Margam (1948–1958)	
Randolph Thomas	?	?	?	Archdeacon of Brecon, (2003-2013)	
Benjamin Vaughan	?	?	BA Classics (1st)	Bishop of Swansea and Brecon (1976–1987), and lecturer in Theology at St David's College (1952–1955)	
David Williams	?	1883	Classics	Archbishop of Huron, (1926-1931)	
Flora Winfield	?	1985	BA	Bishop of Selby, (2024-)	

=== Other religious leaders ===
Name	E	G	Degree	Notes	Ref
Amr Khaled	2005	?	PhD	Muslim televangelist and anti-extremism activist	
Henry James Prince	1836	?	?	Founder of the Agapemonites	

=== Educators ===
Name	E	G	Degree	Notes	Ref
John Cater	?	1974	BA Geography	Vice-Chancellor of Edge Hill University (1993–present)	
Robert Jackson	1963	1966	BA Theology, DLitt (2006, honorary)	Director of Warwick Religions and Education Research Unit at University of Warwick (1994–2012)	
John C. Knapp	?	1999	PhD Theology and Religious Studies	President of Washington & Jefferson College (2017–present), and President of Hope College (2013–2017)	
Henry Morris	?	?	Theology	Pioneer of community education and founder of village colleges	
Michael Scott	?	?	?	Principal of North East Wales Institute of Higher Education (2001-2008); Vice-Chancellor of Wrexham Glyndŵr University (2008-2015)	

=== Academics ===
Name	E	G	Degree	Notes	Ref
Graham Allen	1982	1985	BA English (1st)	Professor of Literature at University College Cork	
William Gibson	?	1980	?	Professor of Ecclesiastical History at Oxford Brookes University	
Sophie Gilliat-Ray	?	?	Theology and Religious Studies	Professor in Religious and Theological Studies, Head of Islam UK Centre, Cardiff University	
William Henry Harris	?	1910	BA Welsh (1st), English and Welsh (Creaton) Essay Prizeman, Treharne and Senior Scholar	Lecturer in Theology (1919–1940), Professor of Theology (from 1940) and Professor of Welsh (from 1941) at St David's College. Also canon and treasurer of St Davids Cathedral	
Craig Jamieson	1971	1974	Philosophy	Keeper of Sanskrit manuscripts, University of Cambridge	
John Geoffrey Jones	?	?	Law	Judge, Mental Health Review Tribunal president known for his views on legal psychopathy	
Omar Khalidi	?	?	PhD	Research librarian for the Aga Khan Program for Islamic Architecture at the Massachusetts Institute of Technology Libraries	
James R. Lewis	?	2003	PhD Religious Studies	Professor of Philosophy at Wuhan University (2019–present)	
Gerard Loughlin	1976	1980	BA Theology and English Literature; MA English Literature	Professor of Theology and Religion at Durham University (2004–present), and Head of the Department of Religious Studies at the Newcastle University (1990–2004)	
H. Jefferson Powell	?	?	BA	Professor of Law at Duke University (1989–2010, 2012–present)	
Daniel Silvan Evans	c. 1845	c. 1847	BD (1868, honorary)	Lecturer in Welsh at St David's College, writer on lexicography and orthography, and professor of Welsh at Aberystwyth University	
Malcolm Todd	?	1960	BA Classics	Professor of Archaeology at University of Exeter, and Principal of Trevelyan College (from 1996)	

=== Broadcasters and entertainers ===
Name	E	G	Degree	Notes	Ref
Victor Brox	1959	1962	Philosophy	Blues musician	
Juliette Foster	1982	1985	History / Church history	Journalist and television news presenter	
Jules Hudson	?	1992	BA Archaeology	Archaeologist, and presenter on the BBC TV series Escape to the Country	
John Murray	1985	1988	BA Geography	Sports broadcaster, senior commentator and Football Correspondent for BBC Radio	
Bruce Parker	1960	1963	English	BBC radio and television presenter	
Andrew Timothy	?	?	?	Announcer of The Goon Show and BBC newsreader	
Rebecca Wheatley	?	?	English literature	Actress, presenter and cabaret singer	

=== Politicians ===
Name	E	G	Degree	Notes	Ref
Dick Cole	1988	1991	Archaeology and history	Leader of Mebyon Kernow, (1997-)	
Karl McCartney	1988	1992	Geography	Conservative MP for Lincoln (2010-2017, 2019-2024)	
Rhodri Glyn Thomas	1991	1991	MTh Theology	Plaid Cymru Member of the Senedd for Carmarthen East and Dinefwr (1999–2016)	
Steve Witherden	?	?	BA English Literature	Labour MP for Montgomeryshire and Glyndŵr, (2024-)	

=== Social activists ===
Name	E	G	Degree	Notes	Ref
Sulak Sivaraksa	?	1958	BA	Thai Buddhist social activist, writer, and economist; twice-nominee for the Nobel Peace Prize	
Sue Slipman	1968	1971	BA English	President of the National Union of Students (1975–1978), and founding member of the Social Democratic Party	
Helen Thomas	1985	1988	BA History	Welsh activist who died during protests at the Greenham Common Women's Peace Camp	

=== Sports people ===
Name	E	G	Degree	Notes	Ref
Bailey Davies	?	?	?	Rugby union fullback and clergyman	
Ivor Davies	1911	?	?	Rugby union player	
Shaun Lightman	?	1966	History	Race walker	
Alfred Mathews	1883	1886	BA	Rugby union player and priest	
Austin Matthews	1925	?	Theology	Northants, Glamorgan and England cricketer	
Ernest Rowland	1883	1886	?	Rugby union forward	
John Strand-Jones	?	1899	?	Rugby union international and army chaplain	

=== Explorers ===
Name	E	G	Degree	Notes	Ref
Hannah McKeand	?	?	BA Classics	Polar explorer	

=== Writers and artists ===
Name	E	G	Degree	Notes	Ref
Tony Bianchi	1969	?	English and Philosophy	Welsh-language novelist	
Euros Bowen	?	?	?	Welsh-language poet	
Eddie Duggan	?	?	MA (Alt) in The Word and The Visual Imagination	Photographer and Senior Lecturer in the School of Engineering, Arts, Science & Technology at University of Suffolk	
Dic Edwards	?	?	?	Playwright and Senior Lecturer in Creative Writing at University of Wales Trinity Saint David	
Richard Fawkes	?	?	English	Writer and director	
John James	?	?	Philosophy	Writer of historical fiction	
Ian Marchant	1976	1979	BA Philosophy	Non-fiction writer and radio presenter	
E. A. Markham	1962	1965	BA Philosophy and Literature	Montserratian poet and playwright, professor of Creative Writing at Sheffield Hallam University	
Adrian Mourby	?	?	?	Award-winning writer, journalist, and BBC producer	
Peter Paphides	?	?	?	Rock critic for The Times (2005–2010)	
Pamela Petro	?	?	MA in The Word and the Visual Imagination	Author of Travels in an old tongue; Sitting up with the dead; The slow breath of stone;, and, The Long field.	
Fred Secombe	?	?	?	Writer and clergyman	
Chris Townsend	?	?	English	Long distance walker and outdoor writer	

== See also ==
- List of vice-chancellors of the University of Wales, Trinity Saint David
- List of academics of University of Wales, Lampeter
