= Alfred Morris (university administrator) =

British academic (born 1941)

Alfred Morris CBE DL
- Born: 12 November 1941 (age 84)
- Children: 1

Academic background
- Education: Lancaster University

Alfred Cosier Morris CBE DL (born 12 November 1941) is a British academic. He was the first vice-chancellor of the University of the West of England in Bristol from 1992 to 2005 and before that was director of its predecessor, Bristol Polytechnic, from 1986.

== Education ==
Educated at Hymers College, Morris went on to study financial control at the University of Lancaster.

== Career ==
In September 2008, Morris was appointed interim vice-chancellor of the University of Wales, Lampeter in order to ensure the creation of a new institution incorporating Trinity University College and University of Wales, Lampeter.

In May 2009, it was announced that Morris had been appointed interim vice-chancellor of London Metropolitan University, following the resignation of Brian Roper. He was succeeded in November 2009 by Malcolm Gillies.

Since 2004, Morris has been a member of the Society of Merchant Venturers, an institution established by royal charter in 1552 whose membership is invited "from individuals who have been successful in their chosen area of business". In response, present day Merchants point to the roles of later members including its Master, Joseph Harford, in chairing the Bristol Society for the Abolition of the Slave Trade which was the first provincial committee founded, in 1788, to promote that object.

Academic offices
Preceded by Robert A. Pearce	Vice-Chancellor of the University of Wales, Lampeter; 2008–2009	Succeeded by Medwin Hughes
Preceded by None	Vice Chancellor of the University of the West of England; 1992 - 2005	Succeeded by Howard Newby
