= Maurice Jones (priest) =

Welsh Anglican priest

Maurice Jones (alias Meurig Prysor) (21 June 1863 – 7 December 1957) was a priest and university educator.

Born at Trawsfynydd, Meirionnydd, he was the second of the seven children of the village shoemaker, William Jones and his wife Catherine He was educated at the local school, then, with scholarships, proceeded to Friars School, Bangor and Christ College, Brecon. After that he attended Jesus College, Oxford, where he gained a first class degree in divinity in 1886, an MA and BD in 1907 and a DD in 1914. After curacies in Caernarfon and Welshpool, he became a forces chaplain.

From 1890 to 1916 he served as chaplain to the Forces in many parts of the world, including six years in Malta and time in South Africa during the Boer War. He continued to study wherever he was stationed; in 1914 he was awarded a DD for his book, St Paul the Orator. On his return to Britain, he was offered the benefice of Rotherfield Peppard (Jesus College being the Patron of the benefice); he remained there until 1923 when he was appointed Principal of St David's University College, Lampeter. When he arrived, the college had less than 70 students, and he worked steadfastly to increase their number. Indeed, he has been described as acting as a one-man recruitment campaign. When he left in 1938, there were more than 200 students. Jones' involvement with higher education did not come to an end on his departure from Lampeter, for he was later external examiner for both Oxford and the University of Wales. He was also a Fellow of Jesus College.

He was a member of the Gorsedd of Bards, with the bardic name of Meurig Prysor, and was treasurer of the Gorsedd from 1925 to 1938, when he was elected Gorsedd Bard. He was attendant druid from 1947 to 1957, and only narrowly missed election to become archdruid in 1955. In that same year, however, he was made a Fellow of the National Eisteddfod. He was also chairman of Cymdeithas Ceredigion Cerdd (The music and poetry society of Ceredigion) and vice-president of the Honourable Society of Cymmrodorion. He was a sparkling preacher in both Welsh and English.

He died on 8 December 1957 in Addington, Surrey, and is buried in the churchyard there.

== Works ==
- St Paul the Orator (1910)
- The New Testament in the Twentieth Century (1914)
- St Paul’s Epistle to the Philippians (1918)
- The Four Gospels (1921)
- St Paul’s Epistle to Colossians (1923)

Academic offices
Preceded by Gilbert Cunningham Joyce	Principal of St David's College; 1923–1938	Succeeded by Henry Kingsley Archdall
