= George Wade (disambiguation) =

George Wade (1673–1748) was a British military commander.

George Wade may also refer to:

- George Wade (musician) (c.1895 – 1975), Canadian folk musician and band leader
- George Wade (pottery manufacturer) (1891–1986), chairman of Wade Ceramics Ltd in Britain
- George Edward Wade (1853–1933), British sculptor
- George L. Wade (1872–1923), American racecar constructor and blackface performer
- George N. Wade (1893–1974), Pennsylvania politician
- George Woosung Wade (1858–1941), British cleric
- Sir George Edward Wade or George Robey (1869–1954), English comedian, singer and actor

== See also ==
- George N. Wade Memorial Bridge or North Bridge, a bridge across the Susquehanna River in Harrisburg, Pennsylvania
