= Christ College, Brecon =

Public school in Powys, Wales

Christ College
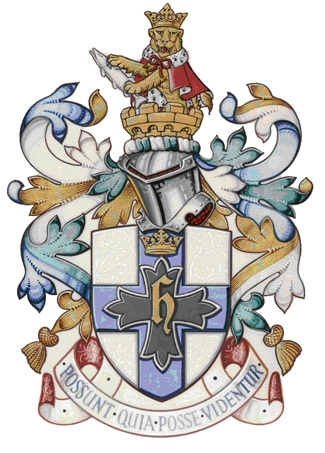

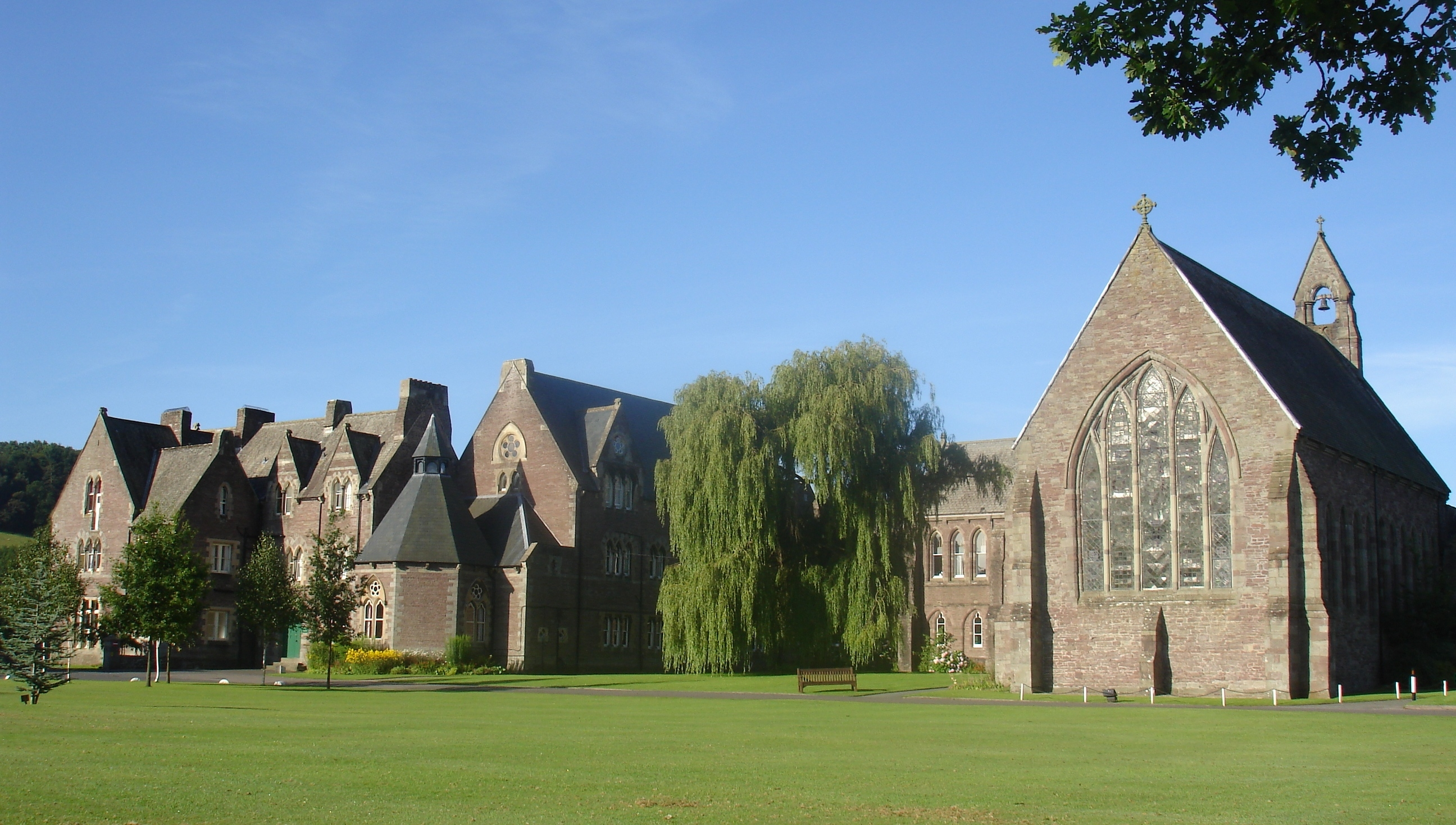

Location
- Brecon, Powys, LD3 8AF; Wales; 51.9462°N 3.3954°W

Information
- Type: Public school Private day and boarding
- Motto: "Possunt Quia Posse Videntur" ("They achieve because they believe they can")
- Religious affiliation: Anglican
- Established: 1541; 485 years ago
- Founder: Henry VIII
- Local authority: Powys
- Department for Education URN: 401984 Tables
- Head: Alex Wallace
- Staff: c. 70
- Gender: Co-educational
- Age: 4 to 18
- Enrollment: 400
- Houses: St. Nicholas (boys and girls aged 4–10); Alway (boys and girls aged 11–12); Donaldson's (girls aged 13–18); Orchard (boys aged 13–18); School (boys aged 13–18) de Winton (girls aged 13–18)
- Colours: Green and gold
- Publication: The Breconian
- Alumni: Old Breconians
- Sister School: King Henry VIII College, Malaysia
- Website: www.christcollegebrecon.com

Christ College, Brecon, is a co-educational, boarding and day independent school, located in the cathedral and market town of Brecon in mid-Wales. It currently caters for pupils aged 4–18 years. The school currently has 380 pupils, divided among its Prep, Middle, and Sixth Form.

The school was founded by Royal Charter in 1541 by King Henry VIII. The closure of Ruthin School in July 2026 officially makes Christ College Brecon the oldest extant school in Wales.

== History ==
The school was founded on the site of the Dominican Friary of St. Nicholas. There is little surviving documentation on the history of the friary; its first mention is in 1269, but its earliest surviving architecture can be dated to 1240. It was the largest of ten friaries built in Wales, with six acres of land and a small garden. On the 29th of August 1538, the Friary of St Nicholas was surrendered to King Henry VIII as part of his broader campaign of dissolving monasteries in England and Wales. The site then stood unoccupied for three years until Christ College was founded in 1541.

The school was founded by Royal Charter on the 19th of January, 1541 by King Henry VIII as 'the College of Christ of Brecknock', which created an English-language Grammar School and a Divinity Lectureship on the site. This was facilitated by moving an existing secular college – Abergwili College – from Camarthenshire into Brecon. The school trained clergy in Divinity until 1822, until St. David's College, Lampeter, was founded for specialty purpose.

Brecon was considered a key location for Henry to establish a school; the town was the capital of the newly established county of Brecknockshire, yet very few of its constituents could speak or read English. The Bishop William Barlow, who played a key role in the dissolution of monasteries in Wales, advised Henry VIII that the creation of Christ College would allow for "the Welsh rudeness would soon be framed to English civility and their corrupt capacities easily reformed into godly intelligence."

The creation of the school on the dissolved friary site mean that parts of the original monastery remain in relatively good condition, and are still used by the school today. The school Chapel, parts of a nave, a refectory and an adjacent hall still survive from the medieval period, dating as far back as 1240. These remaining features are a Grade I listed structures.

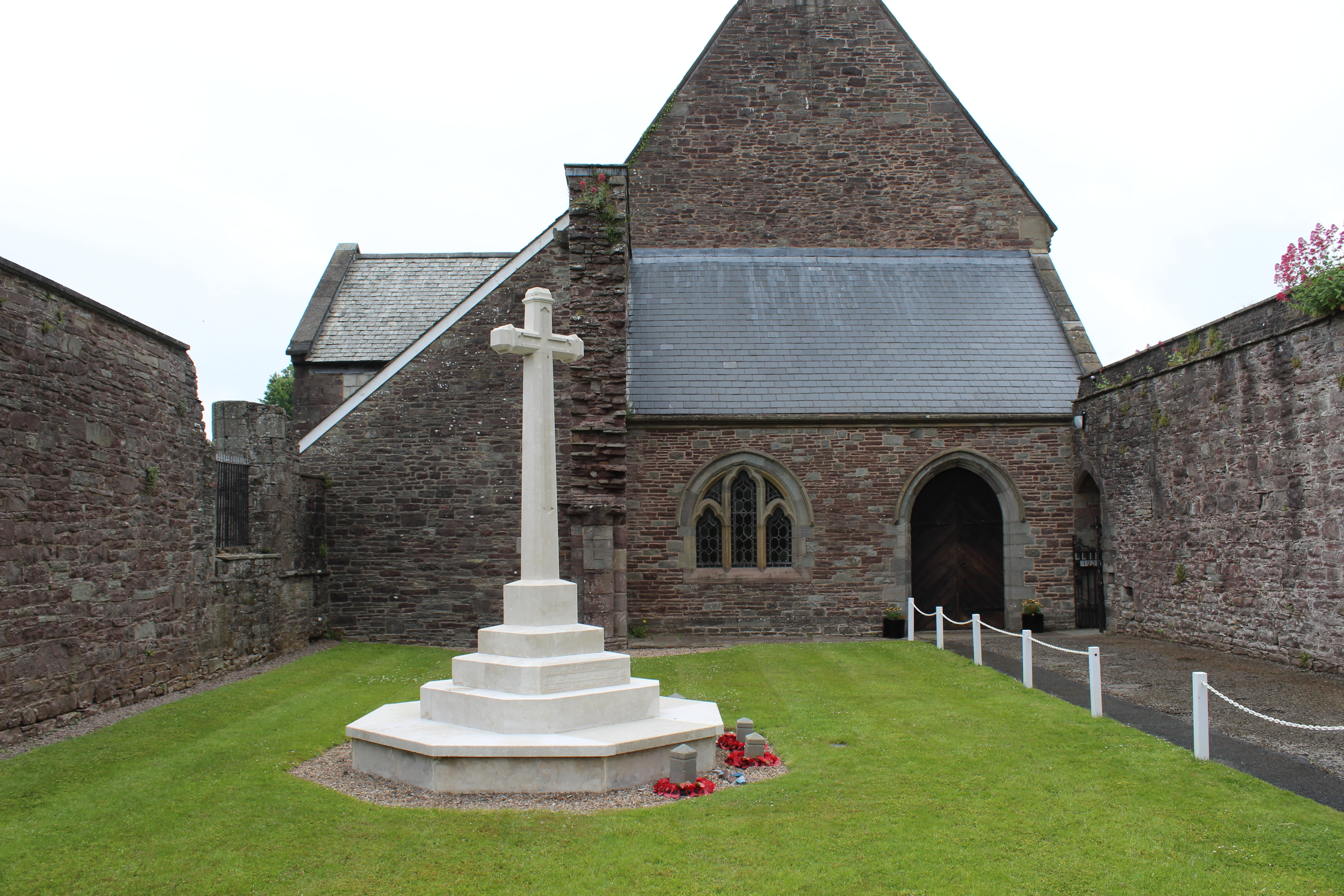
A stone cross on a stepped pedestal erected as a war memorial in 1922 in the courtyard of the chapel. The courtyard is inside the remnants of the priory's nave

Teaching at the school was suspended following the onset of the English civil war in 1645. When the Commonwealth of England began in 1649, parliament seized many church lands, including the friary lands that made up Christ College. The land was purchased by Parliamentarian sympathiser Brychan Thomas. Following his death, his father Roger Thomas took guardianship of the property. In 1660, when it became apparent that the monarchy was due to be restored, Thomas elected to extract as much profit from the site as possible before the land was restored to the ownership of the church. The lead of the roof, the slate tiles of the nave and the original church bell were all sold. Repairs of the college were subsequently undertaken by the then-Dean of the school, Bishop William Lucy.

By the 19th century the college fell into decline, being formally noted by parliament as falling into a "State of Decay". This led to the school being formally revived as a public school by an Act of Parliament, the Christ College of Brecknock Act 1853. The act re-established the college as "The College of Christ of Brecknock" for instruction in letters and divinity (as it did when it was first established in 1541). It also allowed the site to give up land in exchange for compensation, and demanded that Ecclestial Commissioners pay £5000 towards rebuilding the church and the school and collegiate buildings. Subsequently, in 1855 it became a public school by Act of Parliament.

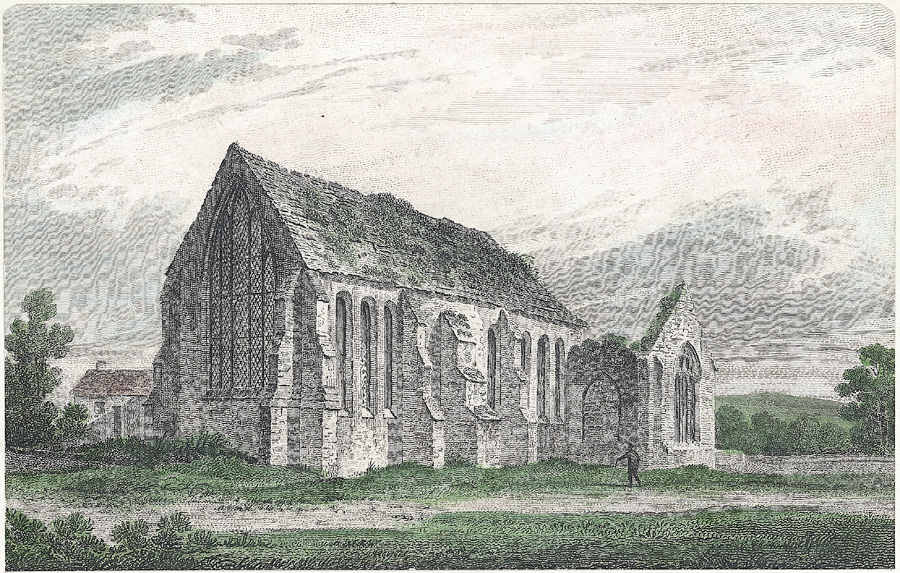
An engraving of St. Nicholas' chapel as it stood c.1792. The chapel had fallen into disrepair by this period. The Bell Tower is missing, having been removed by Roger Thomas in 1660.

The funding bestowed to the school in the acts of 1853 and 1855 allowed the school to fund several expansions and restorations on the site between 1859 and 1872; these were largely undertaken by Seddon and Prichard. In 1864 the first separate boarding house – School House – was constructed. Further renovations were undertaken again by W. D. Caröe in the 20th century.

The school has been ranked as one of the best "value for money" UK boarding schools by The Telegraph. In November 2024, Estyn (HM's Inspectorate for Education & Training in Wales) assessed Christ College's performance as "excellent" across all five inspection areas – the highest grade that can be awarded.

The school become co-educational in 1985. In 2025 the school celebrated 40 years of co-education with a campaign on the schools site and campus.

The school was featured in an episode of the Channel 5 documentary series 'Trading Places'. The episode aired on the 17th May, 2026.

== Cricket ground ==
The first recorded match held on the college cricket ground was in 1888, when the college played Llandovery College. During the West Indies 1991 tour of England the ground was used to host a limited overs match against Wales, Brian Lara scoring 82. In use for the entire 20th century, the ground was used by Glamorgan for a List A cricket match against the touring Zimbabweans. The Glamorgan Second XI used the college ground for Second Eleven Trophy matches, firstly in 1996 when they played the Somerset Second XI and secondly in 1997 when they played the Hampshire Second XI.

== Notable alumni ==
- Robert Ackerman – rugby player
- Richard Atkin, Baron Atkin – lawyer and judge
- William Aubrey – Regius Professor of Civil Law, Oxford
- Collin Bowen – archaeologist and landscape historian
- Andrew Davies SHR – Cricketer
- Bill Evans – rugby player
- Arthur Harding – rugby player
- Oliver Hides - BBC Radio Wales presenter
- Simon Hughes – former MP for North Southwark and Bermondsey, former Deputy Leader of the Liberal Democrats
- James Dickson Innes – painter
- Henry Lewis James – theologian
- Hubert Rees – actor
- Jack Jones – rugby player
- Maurice Jones – priest and bard
- Thomas Jones – artist
- Thomas Babington Jones – cricketer
- Andrew Lewis – rugby player
- Willie Llewellyn – rugby player
- Kieran Marmion – rugby player
- Teddy Morgan – rugby player
- Thomas Morgan – Navy chaplain
- Jamie Owen – Presenter for the BBC Wales Today news programme
- Matt Powell – rugby player
- David Price – Orientalist
- Thomas Price (Carnhuanawc) - historian and Welsh language advocate
- Brinley Rees – Classical scholar
- Paul Silk – Parliamentary clerk
- Peter Watkins – film director
- Lloyd Williams – cricketer
- Roger Williams – former MP for Brecon and Radnorshire
- Tori James – First Welsh woman to climb Mount Everest

== See also ==
- List of the oldest schools in the United Kingdom
