= Ian Marchant =

Ian Marchant may refer to:

- Ian Marchant (author) (1958–2025), English writer, broadcaster and performer
- Ian Marchant (businessman) (born 1961), English accountant and businessman
