= Robert A. Pearce =

British academic (born 1951)

Robert Alasdair Pearce (born 28 November 1951) is a British academic. He was the Vice-Chancellor of the University of Wales, Lampeter between 2003 and 2008.

Educated at Grammar Schools in Birmingham, Bristol and Gloucester, Pearce went on to study law at Pembroke College, Oxford (BA Hons (Jurisprudence) 1973; BCL 1974; MA 1978). From there he went on to hold academic positions at the Universities of Newcastle upon Tyne, Lancaster, University College Cork (part of the National University of Ireland), and at the University of Western Ontario.

Pearce was Professor in Law at the University of Buckingham between 1990 and 2003, where he was successively Pro-Vice-Chancellor, Deputy Vice-Chancellor and Acting Vice-Chancellor. On 1 October 2003, he became the Vice-Chancellor of the University of Wales, Lampeter, in succession to Keith Robbins. In this capacity, he was Welsh Supernumerary Fellow of Jesus College, Oxford for the academic year 2007/8. He retired as Vice-Chancellor in September 2008. Alfred Morris was announced as his interim successor.

He has also been an academic auditor for the Quality Assurance Agency for Higher Education and its predecessor, the Higher Education Quality Council, since 1993.

Academic offices
Preceded by Keith Robbins	Vice-Chancellor of the University of Wales, Lampeter; 2003–2008	Succeeded by Alfred Morris
