= Medwin Hughes =

Welsh vice-chancellor and academic

Medwin Hughes is a Welsh academic who was the vice-chancellor of the University of Wales Trinity Saint David and of the University of Wales from 2011 until August 2023. He was previously principal of Trinity University College, Carmarthen and vice-chancellor of the University of Wales, Lampeter.

In May 2025 Welsh National Opera announced Hughes as its next Chair. After being appointed to the board in July 2022, Hughes was subsequently appointed Senior Independent Director in Jan 2024. He commenced his tenure as Chair in September 2025.

== Biography ==
Hughes studied at University College of Wales, Aberystwyth and Jesus College, Oxford. He earned his doctorate in the Faculty of Medieval and Modern Languages and Literature in 1987, for his thesis entitled "Studies in Calvinistic Methodist Welsh Literature, 1790-1825".

Hughes began his career as a lecturer at the North East Wales Institute of Higher Education, Trinity College, Carmarthen, and Cardiff University. In 1994, he returned to Trinity College, Carmarthen to join its leadership team as dean. He then rose through the ranks as assistant principal (1997–1998), deputy principal (1998–2000), and finally served as its principal and vice-chancellor from 2000 to 2009. Trinity College, Carmarthen was awarded degree awarding powers in 2008 and was renamed to Trinity University College (Trinity UC) in 2009. From 2009 to 2010, he was vice-chancellor of both Trinity UC and University of Wales, Lampeter, during a period of merger between the two universities. He then became vice-chancellor of the newly created University of Wales Trinity Saint David in July 2010. In October 2011, he additionally became vice-chancellor of the University of Wales after a scandal regarding the university's overseas validation process. In response to the scandal, it was announced that the University of Wales, then the "second-largest degree awarding body in the United Kingdom with links to more than 130 colleges worldwide, would stop externally validating degrees; it would only award degrees for "courses it designs and fully controls". Having overseen the "effective disbanding of the University of Wales", he retired as vice-chancellor in July 2023.

In 2017, he chaired the Independent Review of Support for Publishing and Literature in Wales report to the Senedd. In 2021, he was appointed as chair of the Representative Body of the Church in Wales.

In 2013, Hughes was elected as a Fellow of the Learned Society of Wales (FLSW). In the 2023 Birthday Honours, he was appointed Commander of the Order of the British Empire (CBE) "for services to education and the Welsh language".

== Publications ==
- Medwin Hughes (1987) Ceiriog a'r traddodiad telynegol, Taliesin, 59 (1987), p. 62-69.
- Medwin Hughes (1988) Llyfr y Tri Aderyn : agweddau teipolegol, Transactions of the Honourable Society of Cymmrodorion, (1988), p. 47-58.
- Medwin Hughes (1989) Llwybrau (Dinbych : Gwasg Gee) (novel)
- Medwin Hughes (1989) Llythyrau William Erbery, Cylchgrawn Llyfrgell Genedlaethol Cymru, 1989-07-01, Vol.26 (1), p. 17
- Medwin Hughes (1991) Idiom lwythol y llenor Piwritanaidd, Diwinyddiaeth, Rhif 42 (1991), p. 41-62.
- Medwin Hughes (1992) Mythau hanes 'Drych y Prif Oesoedd', Traethodydd (Denbigh, Wales), Cyf. 147 (1992), p. 89-95.
- Medwin Hughes (1993) Cerddi hir Pantycelyn : cerddi diwinyddiaeth hanes, Llên Cymru, Cyf. 17 (1993), t. 239–253.
- Medwin Hughes (1996) Citizenship 2000: Promoting the European Dimension, Evaluation & Research in Education, 10:2, 128–146, DOI: 10.1080/09500799608666911
- Glyn E. Jones, Medwin Hughes, Delyth Jones (1996) Y lefel drothwy : ar gyfer y Gymraeg (Strasbourg : Gwasg Cyngor Ewrop)
- Medwin Hughes (ed.) (1992) The Challenge of Diversity: Primary case studies (CAA Cymru, 1 Jan. 1992)
- Medwin Hughes (ed.) (1993) Blodeugerdd barddas o gerddi crefyddol (Cyhoeddiadau Barddas)
- Medwin Hughes (ed.) (1993) Saunders Lewis y bardd (Gwasg Gee, Dinbych) ISBN 9780707402284

Academic offices
Preceded by David Jones-Davies	Principal of Trinity College, Carmarthen; 2000–2009	Position discontinued
New title	Vice-Chancellor of Trinity University College; 2009–2010	Position discontinued
Preceded by Alfred Morris	Vice-Chancellor of University of Wales, Lampeter; 2009–2010	Position discontinued
New title	Vice-Chancellor of University of Wales Trinity Saint David; 2010–2023	Succeeded by Elwen Evans
Preceded by Marc Clement	Vice-Chancellor of the University of Wales; 2011–2023	Succeeded by Elwen Evans
