= B. R. Rees =

Welsh classical historian

Brinley Roderick Rees (27 December 1919 – 21 October 2004) was a Welsh academic. He wrote extensively on classics, particularly the study of the Greek language. His early work was devoted to Greek papyri; a later publication was devoted to the life and letters of Pelagius.

== Life and career ==
Rees was born on 27 December 1919. His father was a winder in the Mynydd Colliery in Gorseinon, and Brinley was one of four children including the academic and Welsh nationalist Alwyn D. Rees. Rees was educated at Christ College, Brecon, and at Merton College, Oxford. After wartime service in the Royal Welch Fusiliers took his first academic position at Cardiff High School for Boys, where he was an assistant master between 1947 and 1948.

Rees then started his long career in higher education. In 1948, he became lecturer in classics at the University College of Wales, Aberystwyth, then senior lecturer in Greek at the University of Manchester from 1956. From there, he went to the University College of South Wales and Monmouthshire (which became Cardiff University), where he was Professor of Greek from 1958 to 1970. During that time, he was also successively Dean of Arts (1963–1965) and Dean of Students (1967–1968). In 1970 he moved to the University of Birmingham, but stayed there only five years, for in 1975, he was appointed as principal of St David's University College, Lampeter, the very first principal in the college's long history who was not in holy orders. He was a Welsh Supernumerary Fellow of Jesus College, Oxford, in 1975–1976 by virtue of his position as Principal of St David's.

Rees' time at Lampeter came to an end when he retired in 1980, but his involvement in higher education had not come to an end, for he was vice-president of the University of Wales College, Cardiff, between 1986 and 1988.

In 1981, the University of Wales awarded him an honorary LLD in recognition of his service to the colleges at Lampeter, Cardiff and Aberystwyth.

In 1951 Rees married Zena Muriel Stella Mayall; they had two sons. Rees died on 21 October 2004.

== Publications ==
- Ieuan Gwynedd: Detholiad o'i Ryddiaith, 1957
- The Merton Papyri, Vol. II (with H. I. Bell and J. W. B. Barns), 1959
- The Use of Greek, 1961
- Papyri from Hermopolis and other Byzantine Documents, 1964
- Lampas: a new approach to Greek (with M. E. Jervis), 1970
- Classics: an outline for intending students, 1970
- Aristotle’s Theory and Milton’s Practice, 1972
- Strength in What Remains, 1980
- Pelagius: A Reluctant Heretic, 1988, Boydell Press ISBN 0851155030
- The Letters of Pelagius and his Followers, 1991
- Pelagius: life and letters, 1998

Academic offices
Preceded by John Roland Lloyd Thomas	Principal of St David's University College; 1975–1980	Succeeded by Brian Robert Morris
