= Anna Fison =

British translator, poet and educator

- Born: 14 February 1839; Suffolk
- Died: 12 February 1920 (aged 80); Dyffryn Ardudwy

Anna Fison known as Morfudd Eryri and Anna Walter Thomas (14 February 1839 – 12 February 1920) was a British translator, poet and educator. She had an interest in fairy tales and an enthusiasm for Welsh culture.

== Life ==
Fison was born in Suffolk in 1839, the last of twenty children born to Thomas Fison and his second wife, Charlotte. She and her siblings were keen on fairy tales, despite their parents’ disapproval, and would tell stories about fairies, including Tom Tit Tot and Cap o'Rushes. She was educated well both in Europe and in London, and she took a strong interest in languages whilst living with one of her brothers in Oxford. There, she met Charles Williams of Jesus College, who passed on to her his enthusiasm for Eisteddfods and the Welsh language. Her brother Lorimer Fison was an anthropologist.

In 1851, she married David Walter Thomas. While living in Bangor, they had four children, who they brought up with Welsh culture. Their children included Evan Lorimer Thomas. Fison was an enthusiast for education and she organised evening classes for the local quarrymen. She taught herself Welsh and wrote poetry. When she heard about the research being undertaken by the folklorist Charles Hindis Groome about stories from Suffolk, she wrote to him and told him stories from her childhood, including the Rumpelstiltskin-type story Tom Tit Tot and the Cinderella-type story Cap o’Rushes. These stories were later taken up by Edward Clodd.

Fison was part of the movement which aimed to revive the Welsh Eisteddfods during the 1870s and the 1880s. Her bardic name was Morfudd Eryri. In 1883, she attended the National Eisteddfod in Cardiff and won a prize for her poem about Llandaff, which was written in English. It is said that Queen Victoria asked for 100 copies of her poem about the death of Prince Albert.

She translated noted works into and out of Welsh and also from German. In 1884, she was considered as a candidate for the Modern Languages chair at the University College of North Wales in Bangor, but she was not chosen.

Her husband died in 1905.

Fison died in Dyffryn Ardudwy in 1920.
