= David Thomas (missionary priest) =

Welsh clergyman (1829–1905)

- Born: David Walter Thomas; 26 October 1829
- Died: 1905 (aged 75–76)
- Education: St David's College, Lampeter, Jesus College, Oxford
- Occupation: clergyman
- Known for: founding of a Welsh church in Patagonia
- Notable work: editor on the monthly Welsh language periodical Amddiffynydd yr Eglwys
- Spouse: Anna Thomas
- Children: 5
- Father: Evan Thomas

David Walter Thomas (26 October 1829 – 1905) was a Welsh clergyman who was instrumental in the founding of a Welsh church in the Welsh settlement in Argentina.

== Life ==
Thomas was the eldest son of Evan Thomas, from Lampeter, south Wales. After education in Mumbles, Swansea and at St David's College, Lampeter, Thomas went to Jesus College, Oxford in 1847, obtaining a third-class Bachelor of Arts degree in Literae Humaniores in 1851. He was ordained deacon in 1852 by the Bishop of Oxford, Samuel Wilberforce, and ordained priest the following year by the Bishop of Bangor, Christopher Bethell. His first positions were as curate of Denio and Llanor near Pwllheli, Gwynedd (1853) and chaplain of Tremadog near Porthmadog (1854–1855). He then became perpetual curate of Penmachno before his appointment as vicar of Mynydd Llandegai, near Bangor in 1860, where he remained for 34 years. During this time, he was an important figure in the foundation of the Welsh church in Patagonia, where there was a Welsh settlement, with Hugh Davies, the first chaplain, being one of his parishioners. He spent a year as vicar of Braunston, Northamptonshire before moving to Holyhead, Anglesey in 1895 as vicar. He was also appointed a canon of Bangor. He published in English and in Welsh, including a collection of sermons on the miracles of Jesus. Thomas was an editor on the monthly Welsh language periodical Amddiffynydd yr Eglwys.

He married Anna Thomas, who became active in attempts to reform the National Eisteddfod in the 1870s and 1880s, and who was nearly appointed as a professor of modern languages at the University College of North Wales, Bangor. Anna survived until 1920. They had five children, including:

- Evan Lorimer Thomas (1872–1953)
- Myfanwy Walter-Thomas (youngest daughter), who m. in 1902 Frederick John Varley, of the Indian Civil Service.
