= Sophie Gilliat-Ray =

British university teacher

Sophie Gilliat-Ray OBE FBA FLSW
- Born: 15 June 1969 (age 57)

Academic background
- Education: University of Wales, Lampeter

Academic work
- Discipline: Religious studies
- Sub-discipline: Islamic studies; chaplaincy; sociology of religion; Christianity and Islam
- Institutions: University of Cardiff

Sophie Gilliat-Ray OBE FBA FLSW (born 15 June 1969) is a British academic of religious studies, specialising in Islam, chaplaincy and religion in public life. She is Professor of Religious and Theological Studies and Director for the Centre for the Study of Islam in the UK at Cardiff University.

== Early life and education ==
Sophie Gilliat was born on 15 June 1969 in Hereford, Herefordshire, England. She was educated at Malvern Girls College, an independent school in Malvern, Worcestershire, and at Herefordshire College of Technology, a further education college in Hereford. She undertook a join-honours theology and religious studies degree at the University of Wales, Lampeter, graduating with a first class honours Bachelor of Arts (BA) degree in 1991. She remained at Lampeter to undertake a Master of Arts (MA) degree in interfaith studies, which she completed in 1992, and a Doctor of Philosophy (PhD) degree in Religious Studies. She completed her PhD with a doctoral thesis titled "Perspectives on the Religious Identity of Muslims in Britain" in 1994.

== Academic career ==
From 1994 until 1997, Gilliat-Ray was a research fellow in the department of sociology at the University of Warwick. From 1998 to 1999, she was a research fellow in sociology at the University of Exeter. In 1999, she joined Cardiff University as a research fellow. Then, in 2004, she was made a lecturer in religious and theological studies. She founded the Centre for Study of Islam in UK at Cardiff in 2005, and has served as its director since. She was promoted to senior lecturer in 2007 and to reader in 2010. She was appointed Professor of Religious and Theological Studies in 2013.

She was the principal investigator on the AHRC-funded project 'Leadership and Capacity Building in the British Muslim Community: the case of 'Muslim Chaplains' (2008–12), She has also been the co-investigator on numerous other projects, including 'Understanding Religion and Law: Muslims, Fatwas and Muftis in the UK’ (with Robert Gleave and Mustafa Baig, 2016–17), 'Religion in multi-ethnic contexts: a multidisciplinary case study of global seafaring' (with Helen Anne Sampson, 2017–20)

== Awards ==
- Muslim Council of Wales achievement award (2012)
- Fellow of the Learned Society of Wales (2019)
- OBE for services to Education and Muslim Communities in Britain (2020)
- Fellow of the British Academy (2024)

== Publications ==
- 2003. 'Nursing, professionalism, and spirituality', Journal of Contemporary Religion, 18:3, 335–349, DOI: 10.1080/13537900310001601695
- 2005. ‘Sacralising’ Sacred Space in Public Institutions: A Case Study of the Prayer Space at the Millennium Dome', Journal of Contemporary Religion, 20:3, 357–372, DOI: 10.1080/13537900500249921
- 2010. Muslims in Britain. Cambridge University Press. ISBN 978-0-521-53688-2
- 2011. 'Being there’ the experience of shadowing a British Muslim Hospital chaplain. Qualitative Research. 11(5), 469–486. doi:10.1177/1468794111413223
- with Ali, M. M. and Pattison, S. 2013. Understanding Muslim Chaplaincy. Ashgate AHRC/ESRC Religion and Society Series.
