= Henry Archdall =

Australian academic and clergyman (1886–1976)

Henry Kingsley Archdall (2 March 1886 – 27 February 1976) was an Australian academic and clergyman. After teaching at Cambridge University, in Australia and in New Zealand, he became Principal of St David's College, Lampeter and Chancellor of St David's Cathedral, then headmaster of King's College, Auckland.

== Life and church ==
Archdall was born in Balmain, Sydney, New South Wales, the son of an Anglican clergyman. After studying at Sydney Grammar School and Sydney University, where he obtained a first-class degree in philosophy and classics, he studied at Trinity College, Cambridge for a degree in Christian Ethics.

He then became a Fellow and Lecturer at Corpus Christi College, Cambridge in 1911, becoming Dean in 1914. Having been ordained as an Anglican priest, he returned to Australia as rector of Christchurch, Newcastle and Dean of the diocese. After serving as headmaster and chaplain of The Armidale School, New South Wales from 1919 to 1926, he was then headmaster and chaplain of King's College, Auckland from 1926 to 1935. Archdall then returned to Britain as chaplain and director of religious studies at Wellington College, Berkshire before succeeding Maurice Jones as Principal of St David's College (as Lampeter University was then called). He strengthened the work of the college as a centre for training clergy, emphasising in particular the need for a good general university education. In his capacity as Principal of St David's, he became a Fellow of Jesus College, Oxford in 1941. He became Chancellor of St David's Cathedral in 1940, and was appointed as an emeritus Canon in 1956. He was a visiting fellow at Yale University (1954–55), visiting professor at Berkeley Divinity School (1954–57) and Episcopal Chaplain at Heidelberg (1957–59).

He married Laura Madden and they had three sons (two of whom were killed during the Second World War) and one daughter.

Academic offices
Preceded by Maurice Jones	Principal of St David's College; 1938–1953	Succeeded by John Roland Lloyd Thomas
