= Evan Thomas (priest) =

British theologian and priest

Evan Lorimer Thomas (21 February 1872 – 9 April 1953) was a Welsh clergyman and Professor of Welsh at St David's College, Lampeter (which later became the University of Wales, Lampeter) from 1903 to 1915.

== Life ==
Thomas was the son of the clergyman David Thomas and the linguist Anna (born Fison). He was educated at Westminster School and Jesus College, Oxford, where he matriculated in 1891 and was a scholar. He trained for ordination in Leeds, and was a curate in Bangor, Wrexham, Cuddesdon and Colwyn Bay in succession between 1897 and 1903. In 1903, he became Professor of Welsh at St David's College, Lampeter, where his actions to strengthen the Welsh language included reviving the honours degree course in Welsh, holding a Welsh Bible class, and establishing a Welsh library and Welsh-speaking society. In 1915, he became vicar of Holywell and in 1922 moved to become vicar of Tywyn near Abergele before he was appointed Archdeacon of Montgomery and vicar of Llansantffraid-ym-Mechain in 1938. He wrote in Welsh on the Gospel of St Luke and 1 Corinthians. He died in 1953 aged 81 and was buried in Holyhead.
