= David Price (East India Company officer) =

David Price (1762 – 16 December 1835) was a Welsh orientalist and officer in the East India Company.

== Life ==
Price was born at Merthyr Cynog, near Brecon. After the death of his father, a curate, Price was educated at Christ College, Brecon, before matriculating on 5 November 1779 as a sizar of Jesus College, Cambridge, but was nearly penniless by summer 1780 and had to leave the University. He decided to join the East India Company's army, becoming a cadet in it due to his father's friends' influence, sailing for India on the Essex in 1781 and reaching Madras in August that year before volunteering to serve in southern India and returning to the Essex to take him there. He participated in the siege of Negapatam and the capture of Trincomali in Ceylon during the passage to Bombay, arriving on 22 April 1782 and being appointed the following November to command the 2nd Battalion of Bombay sepoys. He then served in the wars on Tippu Sultan in 1782-84, 1790–92 and 1799, losing a leg at the siege of Dharwar in 1791 and thus being re-posted to the guard of Sir Charles Malet, political minister at Poona, then in 1792 to a staff appointment at Surat by the Bombay governor Jonathan Duncan the elder.

During his time at Surat he had enough free time to become keenly interested in Persian culture, collecting manuscripts and studying its historical classics, including the Akbarnama by Abu'l-Fazl, though he also rose to become the Bombay Army's judge-advocate-general from 1795 to 1805. A brevet captain by 1795, he was promoted to full captain two years later. He also served as military secretary and interpreter to Colonel Alexander Dow in Malabar (1797–8) and then as Persian translator to General James Stuart, commander of the Bombay Army (1799), being present at Seringapatam's capture and acting as the army's prize agent (thus making his own fortune). Next he returned to Bombay to continue his studies of Persia, being promoted to major in March 1804 before finally returning to Britain in February 1805, though he only retired from the Company in October 1807, on his marriage to a relative.

He lived in retirement at Brecon, writing works on oriental history and serving as magistrate and deputy lieutenant of Brecknockshire. He was also a committee member of the Oriental Translation Fund, winning its gold medal in 1830, and of the Royal Asiatic Society (bequeathing the latter over 70 oriental manuscripts). He died at his home, Watton House, Brecon.

== Works ==
- Chronological retrospect, or, Memoirs of the principal events of Mahommedan history … from original Persian authorities (3 vols., 1811, 1812, 1821), which soon became a reference work, covering the period from Muhamed's death of Muhammad to Akbar's accession, with the earlier volumes mainly based on the Persian chronicles of Mirkhond and Khwandamir, and the final volume mainly on Abu'l-Fazl
- Essay towards the History of Arabia antecedent to the Birth of Mahommed (1824, from the Persian text of Et-Tabari)
- translation of the Memoirs of the Emperor Jahangueir (1829; new edn, 1972)
- Account of the Siege and Reduction of Chaitur … from the Akbar-namah (1831)
- The Last Days of Krishna (1831)
- Memoirs of the early life and service of a field officer (1839) - published anonymously
