= Brian Morris, Baron Morris of Castle Morris =

British politician and writer (1930–2001)

The Right Honourable The Lord Morris of Castle Morris

Member of the House of Lords
- Lord Temporal
- Life peerage 9 May 1990 – 30 April 2001

Personal details
- Born: 4 December 1930
- Died: 30 April 2001 (aged 70)

Brian Robert Morris, Baron Morris of Castle Morris (4 December 1930 – 30 April 2001), was a British poet, critic and professor of literature. He became the Labour Party's deputy chief whip and education spokesman in the House of Lords.

Born and educated in Cardiff, Morris went on, after national service with the Welsh Regiment, to read English at Worcester College, Oxford. He stayed on at Oxford as a tutor in Old and Middle English while doing his doctorate on John Cleveland, the Cavalier poet. In 1955, he married Sandra James, and they had two children.

His major promotion came in 1971 when he began his decade as professor of English literature at Sheffield University, in succession to William Empson. From 1964 to 1986, he was general editor of the New Mermaid dramatists, and from 1974 to 1982 of the New Arden Shakespeare. He also edited the poems of Cleveland and the plays of John Ford, while using his acquired administrative skills on the board of the National Portrait Gallery. These skills were fully tested when, in 1980, he was named principal of what was then St David's University College, the smallest and most endangered part of the University of Wales. Retaining a home in Derbyshire, he saw his Lampeter appointment as an opportunity to get back in touch with his roots.

In addition to literary criticism such as his study of Harri Webb (1993) for the University of Wales Press in the "Writers of Wales" series, his publications included several poetry collections, including Tide-Race (1976), Dear Tokens (1987) and The Waters of Comfort (1998). His collected poems were published in the year of his death by Rare Books & Berry Ltd.

In 1990, Morris was made a life peer with the title Baron Morris of Castle Morris, of St Dogmaels in the County of Dyfed, expanding his name – to distinguish it from an earlier Baron Morris – by adding "of Castle Morris", a small and largely insignificant hamlet between Fishguard and St David's and actually spelt Castlemorris. He justified his appointment to the unelected body by pointing out "Manchester United football team isn't chosen by popular vote".

A brilliant and respected speech writer, his speeches in the house were sprinkled with quotations from Shakespeare, Goldsmith, Juvenal and Alexander Pope. When Morris reminded the Tories of the saying "Whom God wishes to destroy, he first sends mad," he used the original Latin.

Morris never forgot his Welsh roots, and was a nationalist sympathiser. Whilst he never was a fluent speaker of the Welsh language, he fought for its legal status in the nation.

Later in his political career, Morris was marginalised within the Labour Party for being too 'Old Labour' by supporters of the new party leader Tony Blair. Prior to Labour's 1997 election win, a fellow Labour politician, Bernard Donoughue, commented in his diary that Morris was among the academics who "have never operated on the national stage and are desperately keen to get there".

Morris died aged 70 from leukaemia in 2001.

Academic offices
Preceded by Brinley Rees	Principal of St David's University College; 1980–1992	Succeeded by Keith Robbins
