= Malcolm Gillies =

Australian musicologist and linguist

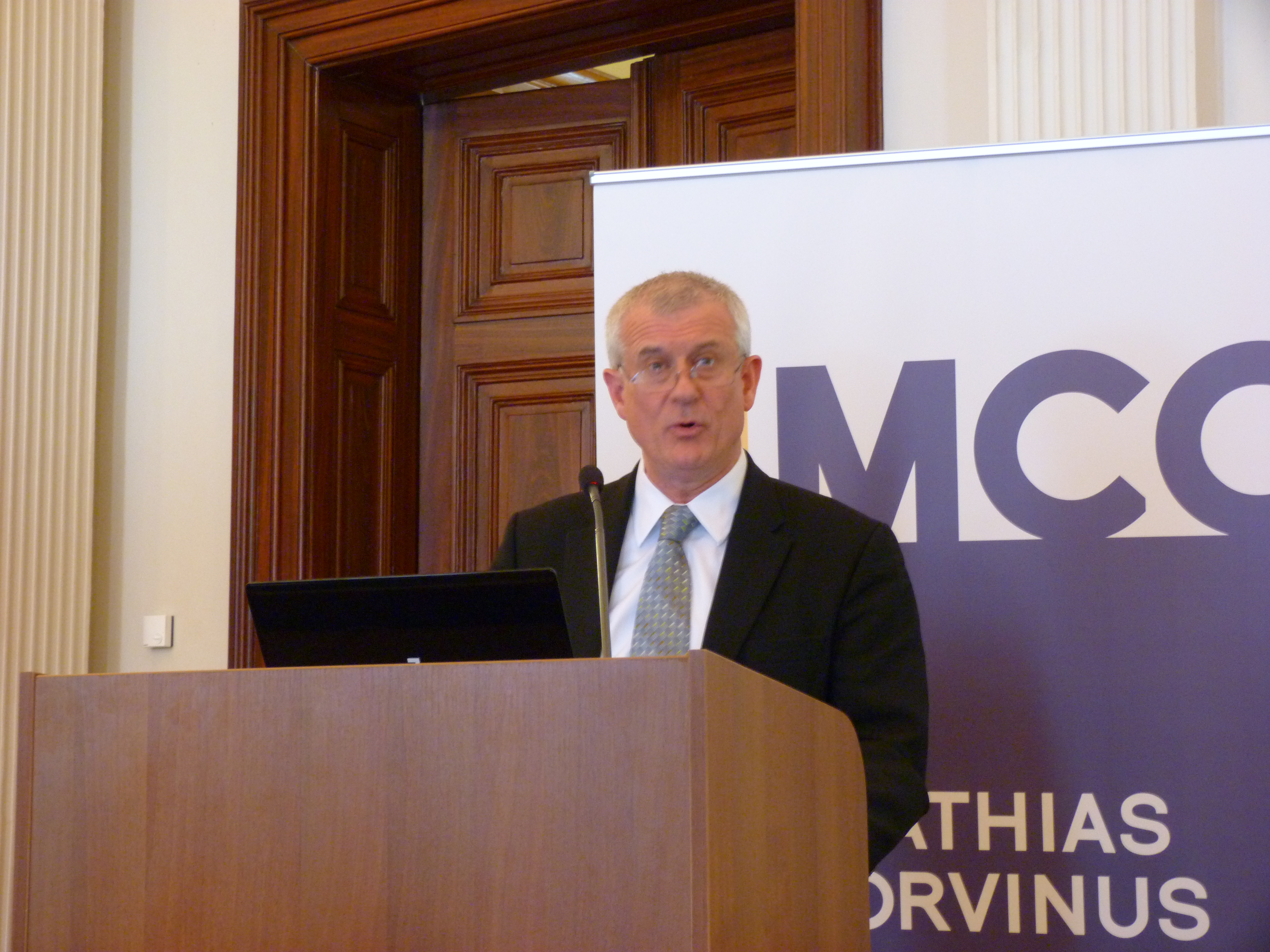
Gillies in 2014

Malcolm George William Gillies AM FAHA (born 23 December 1954) is an Australian musicologist and linguist, who served as vice-chancellor of City University, London, from 2007 to 2009, and of London Metropolitan University from 2009 to 2014.

== Education ==
An Australian by birth, Gillies graduated with a degree in classics from the Australian National University, and subsequently earned a further degree in music from the University of Cambridge. He has been awarded a master's degree from King's College London, and doctoral degrees in music from the University of London and the University of Melbourne. In 1983–85 he was a Hungarian Government Scholar at the Hungarian Academy of Sciences in Budapest.

== Scholarship ==
Gillies is a recognised authority on the composers Percy Grainger and Béla Bartók. He has written or edited a dozen books and over 100 articles, chapters and reviews, and this scholarship saw him elected a Fellow of the Australian Academy of the Humanities in 1992. His co-edited book (with David Pear and Mark Carroll), Self-Portrait of Percy Grainger (2006), was awarded a Deems Taylor Award by the American Society of Composers, Authors and Publishers in 2007.

Since 1997 he has edited the series "Studies in Musical Genesis, Structure and Interpretation" for Oxford University Press.

From 2000 to 2010 he was chair of the board of the international contemporary-music ensemble, Elision. In 2011 he curated the "Bartók: Infernal Dance" concert series for the Philharmonia Orchestra.

== Academic administration ==
Gillies was deputy vice-chancellor (education) and then vice-president (development) of the Australian National University, based in Canberra, Australia, and later at Yale University in the United States. From 1998 to 2001 he was the president of the Australian Academy of the Humanities; and in 2004–6 the inaugural president of the Council for the Humanities, Arts and Social Sciences.

In 2007 he moved to the United Kingdom to become vice-chancellor and president of City University, London. He was described as "well-liked and respected, popular with staff and highly regarded in universities for his thoughtful and imaginative approach", but resigned in the summer of 2009, apparently following disagreements with the governing body.

While at City University, he was also an alternate director of the Office of the Independent Adjudicator; vice-chair of London Higher (an umbrella body representing over 40 publicly funded universities and higher education colleges in London); a Trustee of the City of London Academy Islington; and on the Research Policy Committee of Universities UK. In 2008–11 he was the Schools–Higher Education "Champion" for London.

In November 2009 he was appointed vice-chancellor and chief executive of London Metropolitan University. In office, he oversaw a programme of course closures and staff redundancies. In April 2012 a survey of staff instituted by the University and College Union (with a turnout of 338) returned a 91 per cent vote of no confidence in his management.

Gillies has been chair of London Higher, chair of AccessHE, and a member of the International Network of Universities UK. He serves on the Nyenrode Foundation Board, responsible for the Nyenrode Business University and the Nyenrode Estate in the Netherlands; and is an adjunct professor in creative industries of Queensland University of Technology, Australia.

== Honours ==
Gillies was made a Member of the Order of Australia (AM) in the 2013 Australia Day Honours "for significant service to tertiary education through leadership roles, and to the humanities, particularly as a scholar of musicology."

Academic offices
Preceded by David Rhind	Vice-Chancellor of The City University; 2007–09	Succeeded by Julius Weinberg (acting)
Preceded by Alfred Morris (acting)	Vice-Chancellor of London Metropolitan University; 2009–14	Succeeded by John Raftery
