= Henry Edwards (priest) =

Welsh preacher (1837–1884)

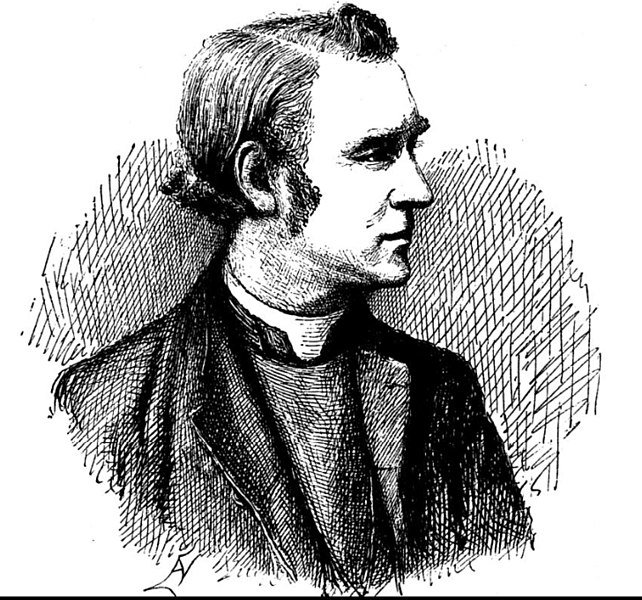
The Very Rev Henry Thomas Edwards, Dean of Bangor

Henry Thomas Edwards (6 September 1837 – 24 May 1884) was a Welsh preacher.

== Life ==
Edwards was born at Llan-ym-Mawddwy, Merioneth, where his father was vicar. He was educated at Westminster but left Westminster in his seventeenth year, intending to proceed to India. However, changing his mind, he studied for twelve months under the Rev. F. E. Gretton at Stamford School. He went up to Jesus College, Oxford (B.A., 1860), and after teaching for two years at Llandovery, he went to Llangollen as his father's curate.

He became vicar of Aberdare in 1866 and of Carnarvon in 1869. He began his lifelong controversy with nonconformity, mainly represented by Rev. Evan Jones (Calvinistic Methodist) and Rev. E. Herber Evans (Congregationalist). In 1870, he fought in vain for the principle of all-round denominationalism in the national education system, and in the same year, addressed a famous letter to W. E. Gladstone on The Church of the Cymry, pointing out that the success of Nonconformity in Wales was largely due to the withering effect of an alien episcopate. One immediate result was the appointment of the Welshman Joshua Hughes (1807-1889) to the vacant see of St Asaph. Edwards became dean of Bangor in 1876 and at once set about restoring the cathedral, and he promoted a clerical education society for supplying the diocese with educated Welsh-speaking clergy. He was a popular preacher and an earnest patriot; his chief defect was a lack of appreciation of the theological attainments of Nonconformity, and a Welsh commentary on St. Matthew, which he had worked at for many years and published in two volumes in 1882, was severely handled by a Bangor Calvinistic Methodist minister. Edwards was also an editor on the monthly Welsh language periodical Amddiffynydd yr Eglwys.

Edwards suffered from overwork and insomnia, and a Mediterranean cruise in 1883 failed to restore his health. He committed suicide at the vicarage, Ruabon; the home of his brother, the Reverend E. W. Edwards.
