= Thomas Babington Jones =

Welsh cricketer

Personal information
- Full name: Thomas Babington Jones
- Born: 20 January 1851; Maesteg, Glamorgan, Wales
- Died: 6 August 1890 (aged 39); Brislington, Somerset, England
- Batting: Left-handed
- Bowling: Right-arm roundarm medium

Domestic team information
- Years: Team
- 1874: Oxford University

Career statistics
Competition	First-class
Matches	6
Runs scored	146
Batting average	16.22
100s/50s	–/–
Top score	40
Balls bowled	706
Wickets	19
Bowling average	14.05
5 wickets in innings	1
10 wickets in match	1
Best bowling	6/26
Catches/stumpings	6/–
- Source: Cricinfo, 6 August 2012

Thomas Babington Jones (20 January 1851 – 6 August 1890) was a Welsh cricketer, who played first-class cricket for Oxford University Cricket Club.

== Life ==
Jones was born on 20 January 1851 in Maesteg, Glamorgan. He was educated at Christ College, Brecon and Jesus College, Oxford. He won his "Blue" in 1874, when he played in the university match against Cambridge, scoring 38 runs as a left-handed batsman. He only played first-class cricket in 1874, playing five times for Oxford University and once for "Oxford and Cambridge Past and Present" in that season. He scored 146 runs in those 6 matches (10 innings), at an average of 16.22 with a high score of 40; as a right-arm roundarm bowler, he took 19 wickets at an average of 14.05, with best bowling figures of six wickets for 26 runs. He died on 6 August 1890 in Brislington, Somerset.
