= Thomas Morgan (navy chaplain) =

Welsh navy chaplain

Thomas Morgan (6 December 1769 – 22 November 1851) was a Welsh navy chaplain who saw action during the French Revolutionary Wars and was involved in the Spithead mutiny before serving as chaplain of the naval dockyard at Portsmouth.

== Life ==
Morgan was born on 6 December 1769 and educated at Christ College, Brecon. He then studied at the University of Oxford, firstly at Wadham College and then at Jesus College, and graduated in 1790. He later obtained his DD degree (1824). He was ordained and joined the Royal Navy as a navy chaplain. During the French Revolutionary Wars, Morgan was injured during the naval battle of the Glorious First of June in 1794. Four years later, he was serving at Spithead during the Spithead mutiny. Sympathetic to the men's grievances, he helped to restore order. Morgan served as chaplain and secretary to Admiral Sir Charles Cotton from 1799 to 1807, then served as a chaplain in naval hospitals before his final posting as chaplain at Portsmouth naval dockyard. He was also a priest of various parishes: Talley and Llansadwrn in Carmarthenshire, Llanfaches in Monmouthshire and Kings Langley, Hertfordshire. He died on 22 November 1851 in Portsmouth.
