= Amddiffynydd yr Eglwys =

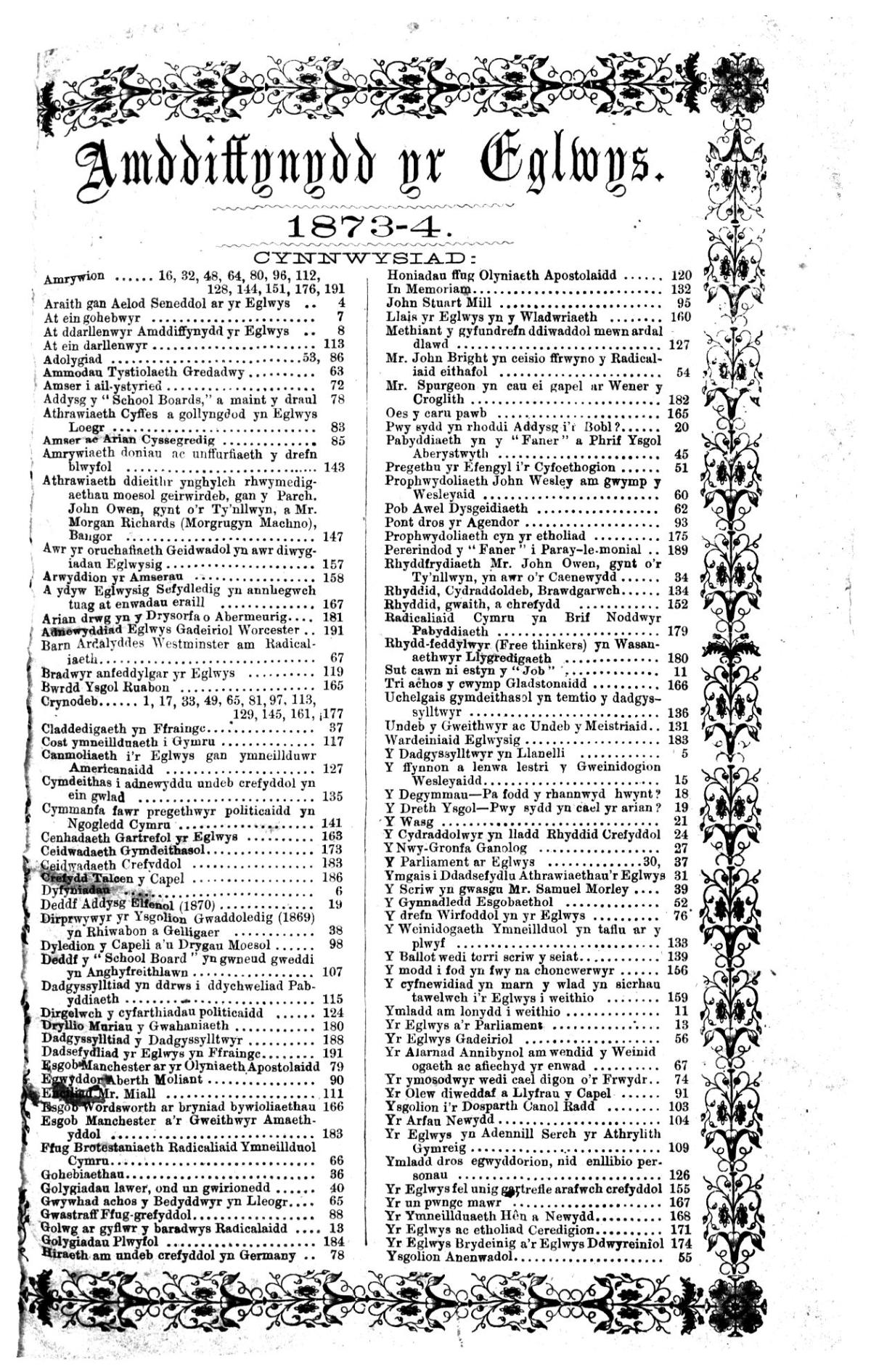
Amddiffynydd yr Eglwys (Welsh Journal)

Amddiffynydd yr Eglwys (Defender of the Church) was a monthly Welsh language periodical published by J. Morris in Rhyl, Wales.

It began publication in 1873, amid debate in Wales over the possible disestablishment of the Church of England. It contained mainly anti-nonconformist religious articles, and a small number of other articles of general subject matter. The Reverend David Walter Thomas (Gwallter Geraint o Geredigion) (1829–1905), the Dean of Bangor, Henry Edwards (1837–1884), and Canon Daniel Evans (1832–1888) were the magazine's editors.

Edwards, who was Dean of Bangor, was the author of several religious works, including The Church of the Cymry, an open letter to William Gladstone, suggesting that "the alienation of the Welsh people from Anglicanism" was due in part to the failure to engage with Welsh-speaking parishioners. Edwards was at the centre of opposition to the campaign for disestablishment being led by the Liberation Society in England.
