= Alexander Goldwyer-Lewis =

British priest; India-based (1890s)

Alexander Goldwyer-Lewis (1849–1904) was Archdeacon of Bombay from 1890 until 1896.

Goldwyer-Lewis was educated at St David's College, Lampeter and ordained in 1873. After curacies in Erbistock and Oswestry he served with the Bombay Ecclesiastical Establishment until his appointment as Archdeacon.

On his return from India he was the incumbent at Aldford then Davenham. He died on 4 January 1904.
