= Keith Robbins =

British academic (1940–2019)

Keith Gilbert Robbins FRSE FRHistS FLSW (9 April 1940 – 12 September 2019) was a British historian and Vice-Chancellor of the University of Wales, Lampeter. Professor Robbins was educated at Bristol Grammar School, Magdalen, and St Antony's College, Oxford.

His academic career began in 1963 as Assistant Lecturer in History at the University of York where he subsequently became Lecturer. He moved to the University College of North Wales, Bangor, in 1971, as Professor of History and was later appointed Dean of the Faculty of Arts. In 1980 he moved to the University of Glasgow as Professor of Modern History.

His final academic post was as Vice-Chancellor of the University of Wales, Lampeter, between 1992 until 2003, when he was succeeded by Professor Robert A Pearce. During his time as Vice-Chancellor at Lampeter, he also served as Senior Vice-Chancellor of the federal University of Wales between 1995 and 2001. He was also a Welsh Supernumerary Fellow of Jesus College, Oxford, for the academic years 1996/7 and 2002/3.

In 2005 the University of Wales awarded Robbins an honorary degree of DLitt in recognition of his years of service to University of Wales institutions and the field of history.

He was President of the Ecclesiastical History Society (1980–81). He was also a Founding Fellow of the Learned Society of Wales and a Member of its inaugural Council.

He died on 12 September 2019 at the age of 79.

== Summary of life ==
=== Education ===
Bristol Grammar School, 1949-58:

State Scholarship 1957:

Demy of Magdalen College, Oxford, 1958-61:

Gladstone Memorial Prize 1960 (Oxford University)

Prox. acc. Gibbs Scholarship 1960 (Oxford University)

First Class (Congratulatory), Modern History, 1961

Senior Scholar, St. Antony's College, Oxford, 1961–63

=== Academic career ===
Assistant Lecturer/Lecturer, University of York, 1963–71

Professor and Head of Department of History, University College of North Wales, Bangor (now Bangor University), 1971-1979: (Dean of the Arts Faculty, 1977–79)

Professor of Modern History, University of Glasgow, 1980-91 (Head of department, 1981–91)

Vice-Chancellor, University of Wales, Lampeter, January 1992- September 2003 (now part of the University of Wales Trinity St. David)

Senior Vice-Chancellor, (Federal) University of Wales, 1 September 1995 – 31 August 2001 (a Cardiff-based post held concurrently with the above)

Inaugurating Chairman Cttee. of Heads of Higher Education, Wales 1996-1998

Chairman, Higher Education Wales Charitable Trust 1996-1998

Special Visiting professor, University of British Columbia, Vancouver, Canada, July–August 1983

Visiting professor, University of Constantine, Algeria, February 1984

Fred Alexander Fellow, Department of History, University of Western Australia, July–August 1995

=== Degrees ===
B.A. (1961); M.A. (1970); D.Phil. (1964) Oxford;

D.Litt. (1985) Glasgow.

Hon.D.Litt. (1999) West of England

Hon.D.Litt, (2005) Wales

=== Fellowships ===
Fellow of the Royal Historical Society

Fellow of the Royal Society of Edinburgh (1991).

Hon. Fellow in European History, University of Nanjing, China (P.R.)

Hon. Fellow, University of Wales, Lampeter (2006)

Fellow of the Historical Association (2007).

Hon. Fellow, Bangor University (2010)

Founding Fellow, Learned Society of Wales (2010) Council (2010–17)

=== Professional bodies ===
Member of Council and a vice president, Historical Association, 1976-; President, Historical Association 1988-1991

Fellow of the Royal Historical Society 1970; Member of Council of the Royal Historical Society 1980–1983; a Vice-president 1984-1988

President of the Ecclesiastical History Society, 1980-1981

Former Member, Scottish Records Advisory Council

D.E.S. Postgraduate Awards Panel (History), 1974–1976; Chairman 1976

President, Welsh Religious History Society 1993-2000

Humanities Research Board, British Academy 1994–1997; Chairman of its Research Committee, 1995-1997

Board of Management, Arts and Humanities Research Board 1998-2003

== Works ==
=== Editor ===
Editor, History (1977-1986)

Editorial Board, Journal of Ecclesiastical History, 1978-1993

Editorial Board, Journal of Indian History 1985

Publications Committee, latterly chairman, Ecclesiastical History Society, 1978-1983

Publications Committee, Royal Historical Society, 1980-1985

Editorial Board, National Identities 1998-2008

=== Author ===
- Munich 1938 (London, 1968)
- Sir Edward Grey: A Biography of Lord Grey of Fallodon (London, 1971)
- The Abolition of War: The British Peace Movement, 1914 - 1919 (Cardiff, 1976)
- The Eclipse of a Great Power: Modern Britain, 1870-1975 (London, 1983). Second Edition, (London, 1994)
- The First World War (Oxford, 1984)
- Appeasement (Oxford, 1988)
- Great Britain: Identities, Institutions and the Idea of Britishness (London, 1998)
- Churchill (Profiles In Power) (London, 2000) ISBN 978-0582437593
- The World Since 1945: A Concise History (Oxford, 2002) ISBN 978-0192803146
- Britain and Europe, 1789-2005 (London, 2005)
- Oxford History of the Christian Church: England, Ireland, Scotland, Wales 1900-2000 (Oxford, 2008)
- Transforming the World: A Global Political History since World War II (Basingstoke, 2013)
- The History of Oxford University Press: Volume IV: 1970 to 2004 (Oxford, 2017) ISBN 978-0199574797

Academic offices
Preceded by Brian Robert Morris	Principal of St David's University College; 1992–1996	Succeeded by Position Discontinued
Preceded by New Position	Vice-Chancellor of the University of Wales, Lampeter; 1996–2003	Succeeded by Robert A Pearce
