= Raymond Renowden =

Welsh priest (1923–2000)

Charles Raymond Renowden
- Born: October 27, 1923 (age 102)
- Died: May 15, 2000 (aged 76)
- Education: Llandyssul Grammar School St. David's College Lampeter; Selwyn College, and Ridley College, Cambridge
- Occupations: Welsh Anglican priest, author

Charles Raymond Renowden (27 October 1923 – 15 May 2000) was a Welsh Anglican priest and author in the mid-20th century.

Renowden was born into an ecclesiastical family. Raymond went to school at Llandyssul Grammar School. He was educated at St David's College Lampeter and then Selwyn College, and Ridley College, Cambridge. At Lampeter, he took a first in theology. He recollected that when he first came to Lampeter many of the facilities were reserved for schoolboys who had been evacuated from Wycliffe College School in Stonehouse, Gloucestershire and were therefore out of bounds for undergraduates. During his time as an undergraduate, he also served in the Home Guard. In 1944 he joined the Army Intelligence Corps; he was posted to India, where he became fluent in Japanese. He was posted to Japan late in 1945 and even accompanied Emperor Hirohito on a visit to see the ruins of Hiroshima. Renowden was ordained in 1952, and began his career with a curacy at Hubberston. He returned to Lampeter to lecture in Philosophy and Theology from 1955 to 1971. He became head of his department in 1957. Generations of students remembered his meticulously prepared, systematic lectures. His wife, Ruth Cecil Mary Renowden, was a part-time lecturer in mathematics. In 1971, he was appointed Dean of St Asaph, a post he held for 21 years. For 17 of those years, he was also vicar of St Asaph's parish church and of two nearby villages.

Church in Wales titles
Preceded by Harold Charles	Dean of St Asaph; 1971 – 1992	Succeeded by Kerry Goulstone
