= George Woosung Wade =

George Woosung Wade (16 August 1858 – 15 October 1941) was a cleric, professor, and author.

Wade was born on 16 August 1858 in China. His father, Joseph Henry Wade, was a merchant sailor (carrying cargo there); not a missionary! He was educated at Monmouth School and then at Oriel College Oxford. He was made deacon in 1885 and then ordained priest in 1886. He worked as curate of Basing, Hampshire from 1885 to 1886, before becoming professor of Latin and lecturer in Hebrew at St David's College, Lampeter. He married Rachel Elinor Joyce, the sister of the principal Gilbert Joyce. He remained at Lampeter until his retirement in 1932. He had a lasting influence on generations of students and through them, on the church in Wales. On retirement, he became temporary chaplain at Monmouth School. On 15 October 1941 Wade died at Monmouth, where he was buried.

He was a prolific author. His books include Old Testament History (1901), New Testament History (1922), and The Documents of the New Testament (1934), together with a number of commentaries In 1934, the University of Wales awarded him an honorary Doctorate of Divinity. His other interests included topography; he was wholly or partly responsible for the volumes on South Wales, Monmouthshire, Herefordshire and Somerset in the Methuen Little Guide series.
