= Chris Philo =

British geographer (born 1960)

Christopher Philo (born 1960) is Professor of Geography at the Department of Geographical and Earth Sciences in the University of Glasgow.

Philo graduated from the Sidney Sussex College of Cambridge University and became a Research Fellow there. In 1989 he joined the former Department of Geography at the now closed University of Wales, Lampeter, in which he held that post for six years, until 1995. Philo then joined the University of Glasgow as a Professor, becoming head of the department in 2002. In 2006 he was replaced as Head of Department by Professor Trevor Hoey and was enlisted on the Geography and Environmental Studies RAE Sub-Panel.

Philo's interests have been in the historical geographies of madness and mental health, and the provision of mental health care.

== Publications ==
- Philo, Chris (1992). "Neglected rural georgraphies" (PDF). Journal of Rural Studies. 8 (2): 193-207.
- Lee, R., Castree, N., Kitchin, R., Lawson, V., Paasi, A., Philo, C., Radcliffe, S., Roberts, S. M. and Withers, C. (Eds.) 2014. The SAGE Handbook of Human Geography. Sage.
- Philo, Chris, ed. (2008). Theory and methods. Aldershot: Ashgate. ISBN 0754627098.
- Philo, C. 2004. A Geographical History of Institutional Provision for the Insane from Medieval Times to the 1860s in England and Wales: The Space Reserved for Insanity. Edwin Mellen Press, Lewiston and Queenston, USA, and Lampeter, Wales, UK.
- Cloke, P., Cook, I., Crang, P., Goodwin, M., Painter, J., Philo, C. 2004. Practising Human Geography. Sage, London.
- Philo, C. & Wilbert, C. 2000. Animal Spaces, Beastly Places, New Geographies of Human-Animal Relations, Routledge, London

== See also ==
- Human geography
- Lampeter Geography School
