= Nigel Yates =

British archivist and historian (1944–2009)

Nigel Yates FRHistS
- Born: 1 July 1944
- Died: 15 January 2009 (aged 64)
- Occupations: Archivist, academic, author

Nigel Yates FRHistS (1 July 1944 – 15 January 2009) was a British archivist, academic and author. He was Professor of Ecclesiastical History at the University of Wales, Lampeter. He received his primary education at Belmont Abbey School and later attended the University of Hull.

== Life and career ==
Nigel Yates was born in Swansea on 1 July 1944. He originally worked as archivist, first in Carmarthen and then in North Tyneside, before becoming head of archives for the Portsmouth City Council and finally for Kent Archives Service. After taking early retirement in 1994, he moved to Blandford Forum. In 2000, he became senior research fellow at the University of Wales, Lampeter, and was appointed Professor of Ecclesiastical History in 2005. He also served as director of research at Lampeter.

Yates died on 15 January 2009. His wife, Paula Yates, also taught at Lampeter. She was formerly a Lib-Dem councillor, leader of Maidstone Borough Council and later dean of non-residential studies at St Padarn's Institute, Cardiff.

== Selected publications ==
- Anglican Ritualism in Victorian Britain, 1830–1910, Oxford University Press (1999) ISBN 0-19-826989-7
- Buildings, Faith, and Worship: The Liturgical Arrangement of Anglican Churches, 1600–1900, Oxford University Press (2000) ISBN 0-19-827013-5
- Liturgical Space : Christian Worship and Church Buildings in Western Europe, 1500–2000, Ashgate (2008) ISBN 0-7546-5795-7
- Preaching, Word and Sacrament: Scottish Church Interiors 1560–1860, T&T Clark (2009) ISBN 0-567-03141-1
- Love Now, Pay Later?: Sex and Religion in the Fifties and Sixties, SPCK (2010) ISBN 0-281-05908-X
