= Harold Arthur Harris =

British classical scholar (1902–1974)

Professor Harold Arthur Harris (27 October 1902 – 29 August 1974) was an academic associated with the University of Oxford. He was born in Oxford, where his father was a college servant. He was educated at Oxford High School, and went on to study at Jesus College, Oxford. Here, he gained a first in Classical Moderations, becoming a senior scholar, and graduating with first class honours in English.

After graduation, Harris gained his teaching certificate, and in 1926 he was appointed Lecturer in Classics and English at St David's College, Lampeter. In 1934, he was made Professor of Classics, taking responsibility for English during the Second World War. He remained in the post until his retirement in 1968.

Harris was responsible for a great deal of teaching at Lampeter. All St David's students were, at this time, expected to study Greek for two years. Simultaneously, the numbers wishing to study English at the college were increasing. This left little time for his personal research interests. Yet he did manage to publish various books and articles, including Greek Athletes and Athletics in 1964, and Sport in Greece and Rome in 1968. These aroused great interest worldwide, and resulted in countless invitations to lecture on the subject.

Harris took a great interest in sport himself, particularly cricket. He possessed a vast knowledge of English County and Test cricketers, and was involved with the Lampeter XI. He also took a prominent role in many college dramatic productions. He visited Greece and Italy on an annual basis, being prevented only during the war years. These visits resulted in him being made a senior lecturer on the official Greek cruise tours. He died suddenly at Oxford in 1974.

A hall of residence at St David's College, which is now the Lampeter campus of the University of Wales, Trinity Saint David, is named for Harris.
