= William Henry Harris (academic) =

Welsh priest and academic (1884–1956)

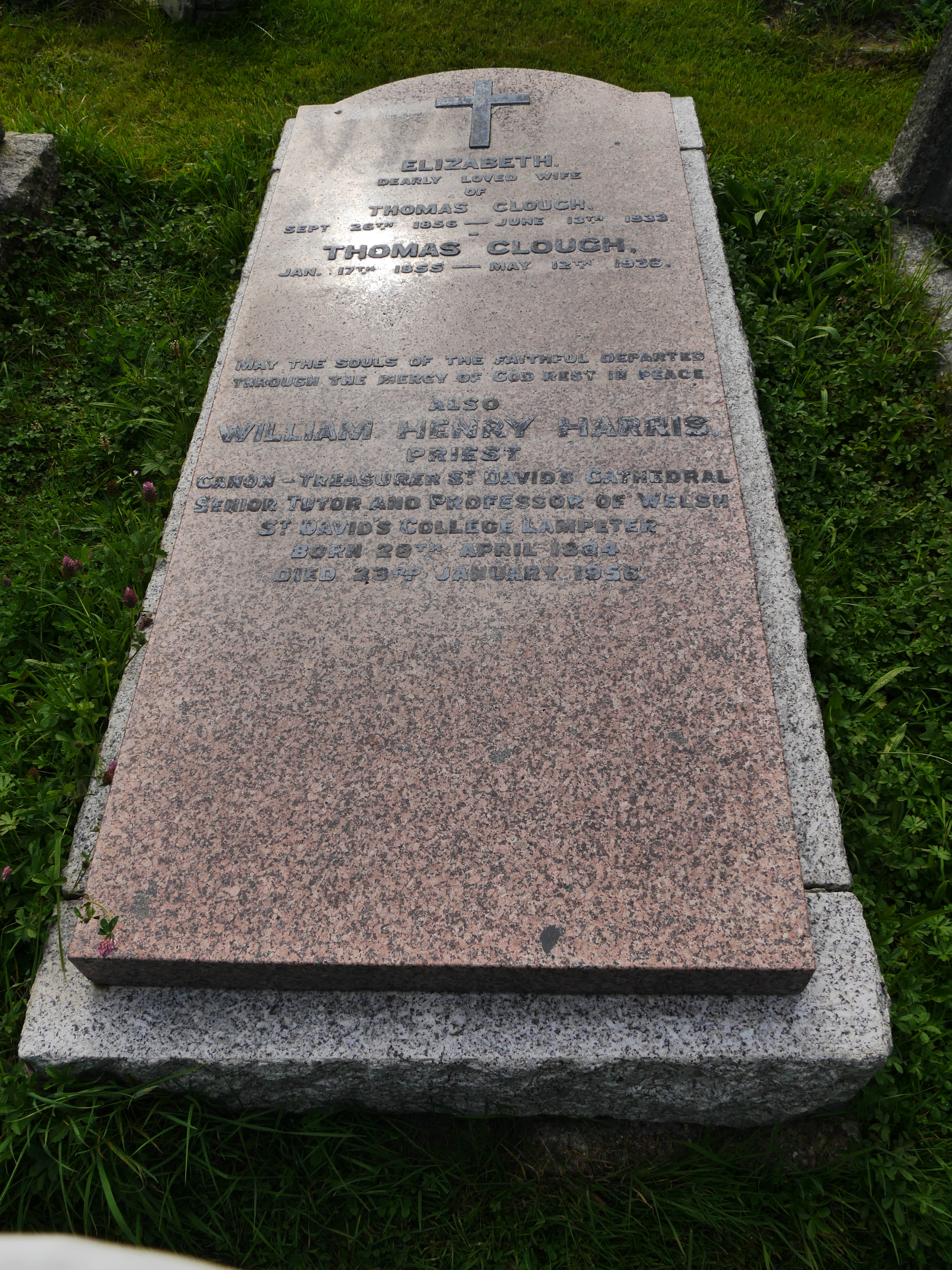
William Henry Harris's gravestone, St Martin's Church, Ruislip

William Henry Harris (28 April 1884 – 23 January 1956) was a British Welsh-speaking priest, academic and translator. Ordained in 1914, he served for most of his life (1919-1941) as a teacher of theology at St David's College, Lampeter, becoming a professor of theology at the college in 1940 and Professor of Welsh in 1941. At the same time, he served at St David's Cathedral as canon (1937) and treasurer (1948). He translated several hymns and liturgical texts into Welsh. As a theologian, he valued the Catholic inheritance in the reformed churches and fostered this inheritance within the Church in Wales. He also served as professor of Welsh at St David's College, Lampeter.

== Early life ==
He was born on 28 April 1884 at Pantysgellog, Dowlais, Glamorgan, Wales. His parents were John and Anne Harris, and he attended Merthyr County School. He went on to gain a first-class BA degree from St David's College, Lampeter in 1910, and then a B.Litt. in 1913 and M.A. in 1914 from Jesus College, Oxford, where he held the Meyrick Research Scholarship and the Powis Exhibition.

Harris was ordained a deacon in 1913 and a priest in 1914. After first being curate in Ystradgynlais in the Swansea Valley, he moved to Christ Church, Swansea, in 1917 and then to All Saints, Oystermouth, Swansea, in the following year.

In 1919 he took the post of lecturer in theology at St David's College, Lampeter. He became a canon of St Davids Cathedralin 1937. He accepted the post of Professor of Theology at St David's College in 1940, and in 1941 that of Professor of Welsh. In 1948, he became Canon Treasurer of St Davids Cathedral (remaining as Professor at Lampeter).

== Career ==
After his ordination in 1913, he served as curate in Ystradgynlais until 1917, when he returned to St. David's College to become a lecturer in theology. He continued in the College, becoming professor of Welsh in 1941 and then senior tutor in 1945.

From 1937 he served as Prebendary and Canon of St. Nicholas, Penffos, at St. David's Cathedral. He was a supporter of the Gorsedd and the National Eisteddfod of Wales and was a Druid in the Gorsedd Beirdd Ynrys Brydain. He was also a Fellow of the British Esperanto Association and a keen internationalist.

Harris was a supporter of the catholicity of the Church in Wales and was a founder member of the St David's Society which was set up to promote this. He wrote on this and on other theological topics and served on committees for the Welsh Church Hymnary (translating some of the hymns himself) and the Book of Common Prayer. He was a member of the Gorsedd of Bards, with his bardic name being "Arthan". He also translated the office of Compline into Welsh in 1941.

In July 1924, Harris married Dorothy Clough and they subsequently had two daughters.

== Death and legacy ==
He died in London on 23 January 1956 and is buried at St Martin's Church, Ruislip.

His obituary in The Times observes: "With his great capacity and his love of learning Canon Harris carried himself with a modesty and a kindliness which will always be looked upon by his many friends as his outstanding characteristic."
