= Ian Marchant (author) =

British writer (1958–2025)

Ian Peter Marchant (14 March 1958 – 14 November 2025) was an English writer, broadcaster and performer born in Shalford, Surrey. He was best known for his non-fiction—mainly travel writing and memoir—but he also wrote two novels and several other books, as well as short stories and newspaper articles. Marchant made programmes for BBC Radio and for UK regional television. He was a lecturer in Creative Writing in the School of English at Birmingham City University. Marchant died from prostate cancer in Hereford, on 14 November 2025, at the age of 67.

== Career ==
=== Books ===
Parallel Lines (2003) examines the history of the British railway system and meets people involved with it. The Times described it as "wonderfully funny...by turns vulgar, cutting, lyrical, erudite and satirical. But what really makes the book — especially for fellow addicts — is the attention to railway detail."

The Longest Crawl (2006) describes a journey through the pubs of Britain, from the southernmost to the northernmost, taking in the history of Britain's relationship with alcohol. Nick Lezard in The Guardian chose it as his Book of the Week, commenting "he has a way of telling a story, a pleasing tone, and a way of shoving in a lot of information - and philosophy, too, at one point - without a trace of lecturing. It's a big, fat affirmation of life, and Lord knows, we can all do with one of them from time to time."

Something of the Night (2012) is subtitled "A journey through the darkness of the British Isles" and includes facts about what happens at night; but it is also a very personal book, looking at the author's own relationship with various aspects of night-time. The London Evening Standard, noting that the contents included "straw mattresses, fireworks, Bonfire Night in Lewes, pop music, floodlit football matches...the Northern Irish linen industry...ex-girlfriends...nightingales, death", concluded that Marchant "carries us through all this, with patience, good humour, self-lacerating honesty and an immense amount of charm. I don't see how anyone could fail to like it."

=== Broadcasting ===
Ian Marchant's 2011 programme for BBC Radio 4, The Ghost Trains of Old England was featured on the station's Pick of the Week. His BBC Radio 3 programme in the same year, Walking with Attitude, was chosen as a radio highlight by the Radio Times and The Guardian. In 2012, the Radio Times described his North and South programme as "arrestingly well-written". Some of his work includes:

- Presenter of Thomas Telford, half hour documentary for ITV Border, broadcast Oct. 2007. Nominated for Royal Television Society Award, best local documentary 2007
- Presenter/co-writer of Fun For Some, 4-part documentary/light entertainment series for ITV Border, broadcast April/May 2008
- A Load of Rubbish, five-part series for Radio Four, broadcast December 2008
- Top Deck, half hour documentary for Radio Four, broadcast January 2009
- The Archive Hour, Radio Four, September 2010
- The Ghost Trains of Old England, Radio Four, October 2010
- The Completists, Radio Four, February 2011
- The Sunday Feature, Walking With Attitude, Radio Three, December 2011
- North and South: Across the Great Divide, Radio Four, February 2012

=== Drama and performing ===
The drama White Open Spaces was staged at the Edinburgh Festival and nominated for an Arts Council Decibel Award in 2008. As part of the act "Your Dad", Marchant performed at Glastonbury Festival, Secret Garden Party, Eden Festival and Sheep Music. An article about his live performances was in The Observer in 2009.

== Bibliography ==
- Juggling for a Degree - Experiences of mature students in further education - 1995, Innovations in Higher Education, co-editor with Hilary Arksey.
- In Southern Waters - 1999, Victor Gollancz
- The Battle For Dole Acre - 2001, Weidenfeld & Nicolson
- Crypts, Caves and Tunnels of London - 2002, Watling Street Publishing
- Men and Models - 2003, New Holland
- Parallel Lines - 2003, Bloomsbury
- The Longest Crawl - 2006, Bloomsbury
- Something of the Night - 2012, Simon and Schuster
- A Hero for High Times - 2018, Jonathan Cape
- One Fine Day (A Journey Through English Time) - 2023, September
- The Breaking Wave - 2025, Peter and Jane Books
