= John Lloyd Thomas =

British academic and priest (1908–1984)

John Roland Lloyd Thomas (22 February 1908 – 11 April 1984) was an Anglican priest and the Principal of St David's University College from 1953 to 1975. He was, himself, a graduate of St David's College, gaining a BA from the institution before completing a second BA in theology at Jesus College, Oxford. He was the first Lampeter graduate to become Principal of St David's.

He was ordained in 1933 and was the Curate at St John the Baptist, Cardiff from 1932 until 1940 when he became a Chaplain to the Forces. After this he held incumbencies at Canton, and Newport before becoming Dean of Monmouth, a post he held from 1952 until 1953.

During his years as principal, in 1971 he led the college into membership of the federal University of Wales. Previous principals had fought to maintain the college's independence, and the move was not universally popular, but it ultimately proved to be a turning point in the college's history, and saved it from near-certain bankruptcy. He later wrote about these events in a book, Moth or Phoenix? St David’s College and the University of Wales and the University Grants Committee (ISBN 0-85088-503-5). The title parodies previous claims that the college was like a moth, burning its wings as it tried to escape the light of the University of Wales.

Lloyd Thomas' name lives on at the college in the residential Lloyd Thomas Halls.

Church in Wales titles
Preceded by Joseph Davies	Dean of Monmouth; 1952–1953	Succeeded by Ellis Evans
Academic offices
Preceded by Henry Kingsley Archdall	Principal of St David's College; 1953–1971	Succeeded by Position Discontinued
Preceded by New Position	Principal of St David's University College; 1971–1975	Succeeded by Brinley Rees
