= List of vice-chancellors of the University of Wales, Trinity Saint David =

The vice-chancellor of the University of Wales, Trinity Saint David, and of its predecessor institutions, is the executive head of the university.

The institution has changed its title three times in its history, from St David's College to St David's University College in 1971, then to the University of Wales, Lampeter in 1996, and more recently to the University of Wales, Trinity Saint David, formed by the a merging of University of Wales, Lampeter, and Trinity University College, Carmarthen, in 2010. Names of office-holders below are split up by institution.

== Principals of St David's College ==
- 1827 Llewelyn Lewellin (1798–1878)
- 1879 Francis John Jayne (1845–1921) (Also Bishop of Chester)
- 1886 Herbert Edward Ryle (1856–1925) (Also Bishop of Exeter and Winchester)
- 1888 Charles Gresford Edmondes (1838–1893)
- 1892 John Owen (1854–1926) (Also Bishop of Saint David's)
- 1897 George William Gent (1852–1898)
- 1898 Llewellyn John Montfort Bebb (1862–1915)
- 1916 Gilbert Cunningham Joyce (1866–1942) (Also Bishop of Monmouth)
- 1923 Maurice Jones (1863–1957)
- 1938 Henry Kingsley Archdall (1886–1976)
- 1953 John Roland Lloyd Thomas (1908–1984)

== Principals of St David's University College ==
- 1971 John Roland Lloyd Thomas (1908–1984)
- 1975 Brinley Rees (1919–2004)
- 1980 Brian Robert Morris, Baron Morris of Castle Morris (1930–2001)
- 1992 Keith Robbins (1940–2019)

== Vice-chancellors of the University of Wales, Lampeter ==
- 1996 Keith Robbins (1940–2019)
- 2003 Robert A Pearce (1951–)
- 2008 Alfred Morris (1941–)
- 2009 Medwin Hughes (Also of Trinity University College, Carmarthen)

== Vice-chancellors of the University of Wales, Trinity Saint David ==
- 2010 Medwin Hughes
- 2023 Elwen Evans
