= University of Wales, Lampeter =

University in Lampeter, Wales, 1822–2010

Coordinates: 52.1139°N 4.0759°W

- Prifysgol Cymru, Llanbedr Pont Steffan
- Motto: Gair Duw Goreu Dysg (Welsh)
- Motto in English: The Word of God is the Best Learning (or Teacher)
- Active: 1822 (Charter 1828)–2010
- Location: College Street; Lampeter; Ceredigion, Lampeter, Wales, UK
- Campus: Rural
Colours
Black and Gold

University of Wales, Lampeter (Welsh: Prifysgol Cymru, Llanbedr Pont Steffan) was a university in Lampeter, Wales. Founded in 1822, and incorporated by royal charter in 1828, it was the oldest degree awarding institution in Wales, with limited degree awarding powers since 1852. It was a self-governing college of the University of Wales from 1972 until its merger (under its 1828 charter) with Trinity University College in 2010 to form the University of Wales Trinity Saint David.

The university was founded as St David's College (Coleg Dewi Sant), becoming St David's University College (Coleg Prifysgol Dewi Sant) in 1971, when it became part of the federal University of Wales. With fewer than 2,000 students on campus, it was often claimed to be one of the smallest public universities in Europe.

== History ==
When Thomas Burgess was appointed Bishop of St David's in 1803, he saw a need for a college in which Welsh ordinands could receive a higher education. The existing colleges at Oxford and Cambridge were out of the geographical and financial means of most would-be students.

Burgess had no Welsh connections; he was born in Odiham, Hampshire in 1756. After education at Winchester College and Corpus Christi College, Oxford, he had short stays in Salisbury and Durham before being appointed to his first bishopric in Wales in 1803. Burgess intended to build his new college to train priests in Llanddewi Brefi which, at the time, was similar in size to Lampeter but ten kilometres from it and with an honoured place in the Christian history of Wales. When Burgess was staying with his friend the Bishop of Gloucester in 1820, however, he met John Scandrett Harford, a wealthy landowner from Gloucestershire. Harford donated the 3 acres (1.2 ha) Castle Field site in Lampeter, named after the Norman castle once contained in the field. This is the site on which the present University stands.

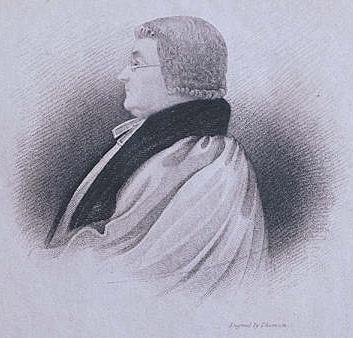
Engraving of Bishop Burgess

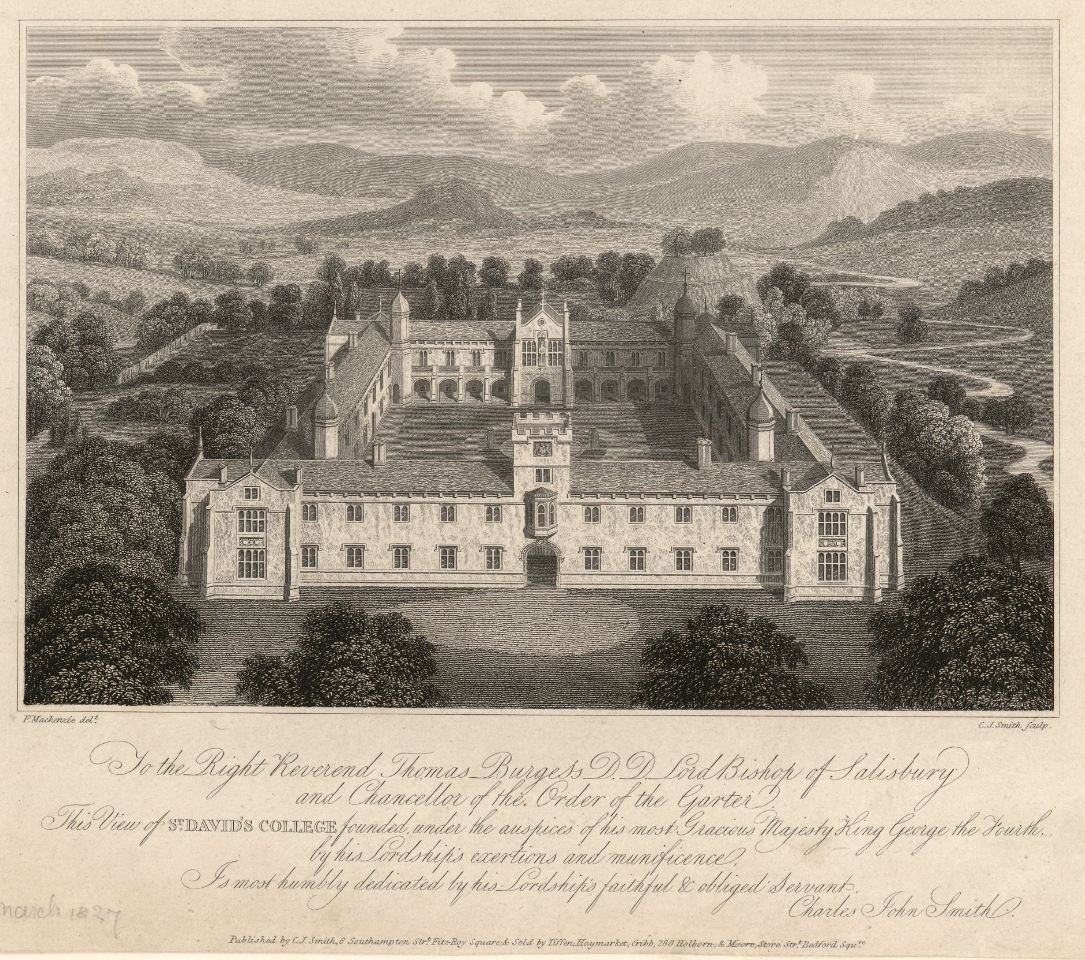
View of St. David's College c.1835

St David's College was thus founded just outside Lampeter; the foundation stone was laid in 1822. Burgess left St David's in 1825 to become Bishop of Salisbury but work on the college continued, largely supervised by Harford. The £16,000 required to erect the college had been raised from public donations, a government grant and highly publicised gifts, including one from King George IV. The main college building was completed in 1827 and the college officially opened on St David's Day of that year, welcoming its first 26 students. As such, it was the oldest institution of higher education in Wales, and the third oldest in England and Wales, receiving its first charter in 1828. In 1852, the college gained the right to award the degree of Bachelor of Divinity (BD) and, in 1865, the degree of Bachelor of Arts (BA), long before the other colleges in Wales gained their own degree awarding powers. As early as 1865, when a campaign had commenced to establish a University for Wales, there were suggestions that the college should take on this function. However, they were opposed by those who believed it should retain its original purpose as a theological college.

Although it continued as a centre of clergy training until 1978, there was always a proportion of students who did not intend to be ordained. The 1896 charter specifically stated that the college could accept anyone, regardless of whether they intended to take holy orders. Since 1925, it had been possible to study for a BA at the college without studying any theology at all. However, throughout the college's history, non-ordinands had been in a minority. In the 1950s the number of ordinands declined sharply and the college faced possible closure unless it could secure government funding. Principal J.R. Lloyd Thomas did not spare himself in the fight for survival and, in 1960, after much negotiation, University College, Cardiff, agreed to sponsor Saint David's. Thus the government finally began to assist SDC financially.

Following the appointment of Rowland Williams as vice principal in 1849, and inspired by the "muscular Christianity" movement, the college passed a rule in 1850 stating that students "should spend their spare time in healthful exercise rather than in clownish lounging about the shops or market place". This led to the formation of a cricket team, which played its first match (against Lampeter Town) in 1852. Williams is thought to have introduced rugby union at Lampeter in the 1850s, where the first recorded rugby game in Wales was played (against Llandovery College) in 1866.

In 1971, the college became a member of the federal University of Wales and suspended its own degree-awarding powers. It became St David's University College (SDUC). By this time, the college had begun shifting its specialisms and, whilst theology continued to be a strong point, students could choose from a much wider range of liberal arts subjects. In 1996, the Privy Council – in response to a petition from the university – agreed to change its title again to the University of Wales, Lampeter in line with moves elsewhere in the university and the recognition of its growth and changing status. In September 2007, the University of Wales become confederal rather than federal in nature, effectively giving Lampeter independent university status. Unlike other former Wales colleges however, the institution's name remained unchanged.

The university specialised in theology, religious studies, philosophy, classics, anthropology, archaeology, English and history. Prior to the merger, the university was also growing in disciplines from the liberal arts and social sciences such as film and media studies, information society studies, business management, Chinese studies and voluntary sector studies. However, in the last two decades of its existence several other departments which taught subjects in their own right closed, including French, German and geography.

The university had research and consultancy departments, including the centre for beliefs and values, centre for enterprise, European and extension services, archaeological services and the centre for the study of religion in Celtic societies.

In the early 1990s, there also existed an influential human geography department at the college. This was closed in 2001 but the diaspora of the Lampeter geography school continue to have an influence on their field.

In 2008, the Quality Assurance Agency concluded that, although the quality of Lampeter's degrees was satisfactory, they had 'limited confidence' in the institution's quality assurance procedures and systems. Further to this assessment, the Higher Education Funding Council for Wales commissioned a further report which found "very real problems of leadership and management" at the university. As a result of this, the university announced that it was in merger talks with Trinity College, Carmarthen with the intention of forming a new university in Wales. In July 2010, it was announced that the Queen had approved the grant of a supplemental charter to Lampeter that would create the new University of Wales Trinity Saint David (UWTSD), which would accept its first students in September 2010.

The college continued as a campus of UWTSD until 2025, when undergraduate teaching ended. UWTSD, which also owns the Coleg Sir Gâr and Coleg Ceredigion further education colleges, said they were exploring options to use the site for post-16 vocational training.

== University buildings ==
=== The Old College ===
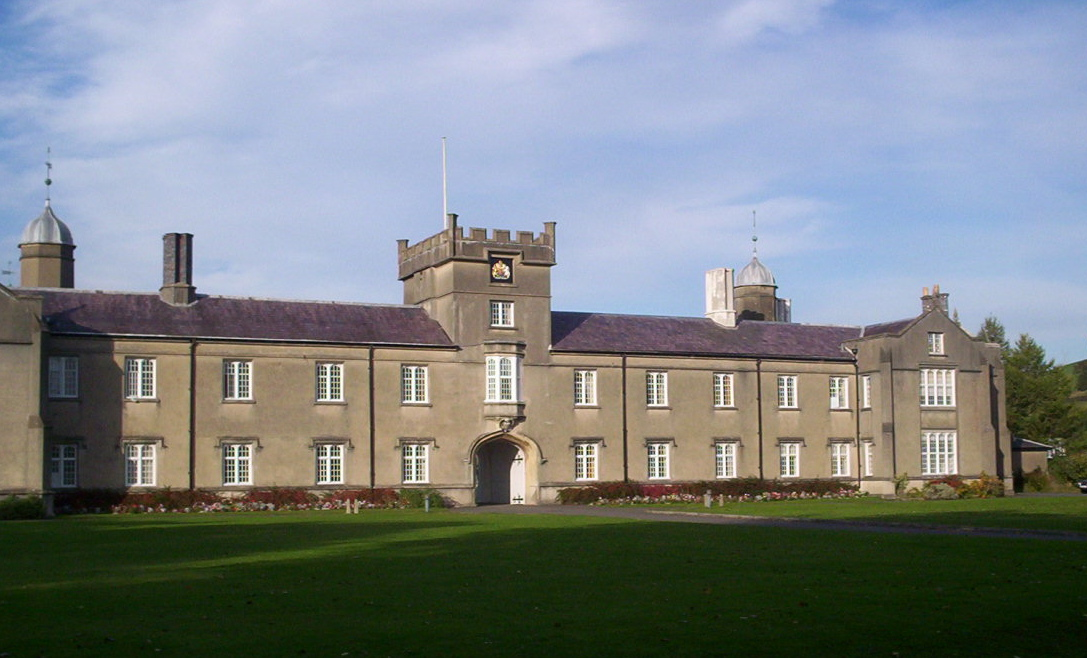
The St David's Building at the University of Wales, Lampeter

C.R. Cockerell designed the original college, now called the Saint David's Building (Old Building or OB by students) in the centre of the Campus. It is a Grade II* listed building and contains lecture rooms, common rooms, administrative offices, student residential accommodation and the following three main areas:

The Old Hall was the refectory until the Lloyd Thomas Building came into use in 1969. It fell into disuse; however after much restoration, it re-opened in 1991 as one of the main public rooms for meetings, dinners, conferences and for use by outside organisations. It was also used for some examinations.

The Old Hall also contains paintings of various principals, presidents, benefactors, vice-chancellors et al. including Bishop Burgess, Maurice Jones, Thomas Price, Llewelyn Lewellin, Edward Harold Browne, Keith Robbins and Brian Robert Morris.

St David's Chapel was consecrated in 1827. In 1879, it was rebuilt according to the specifications of the architect Thomas Graham Jackson of Cambridge. It re-opened on 24 June 1880. It was then refurbished again during the 1930s, mainly through the provision of a new reredos in 1933 and a major overhaul of the organ in 1934. The chapel was provided with a dedicated chaplain and services were held on Sundays and throughout the week as well as on saints' days and major festivals.

The Founders' Library housed the main library until the new library opened in 1966. After this time the library housed the university's oldest printed books (1470–1850) and manuscripts (the earliest from the thirteenth century), given to Lampeter from 1822 onwards, as well as the archives of the university. It is a priceless collection unique to Lampeter. Named after its founders – Thomas Burgess (1756–1837), Thomas Bowdler (1754–1825), and Thomas Phillips (1760–1851) – it served as a resource for research and teaching, particularly in English, History and Mediaeval Studies. In 2005, it was announced that a new £700,000 library building was to be built on campus to house the university's special collections, as the Founders' Library was not environmentally suitable for such valuable documents. This extension to the main library was completed in 2008.

=== Later additions ===
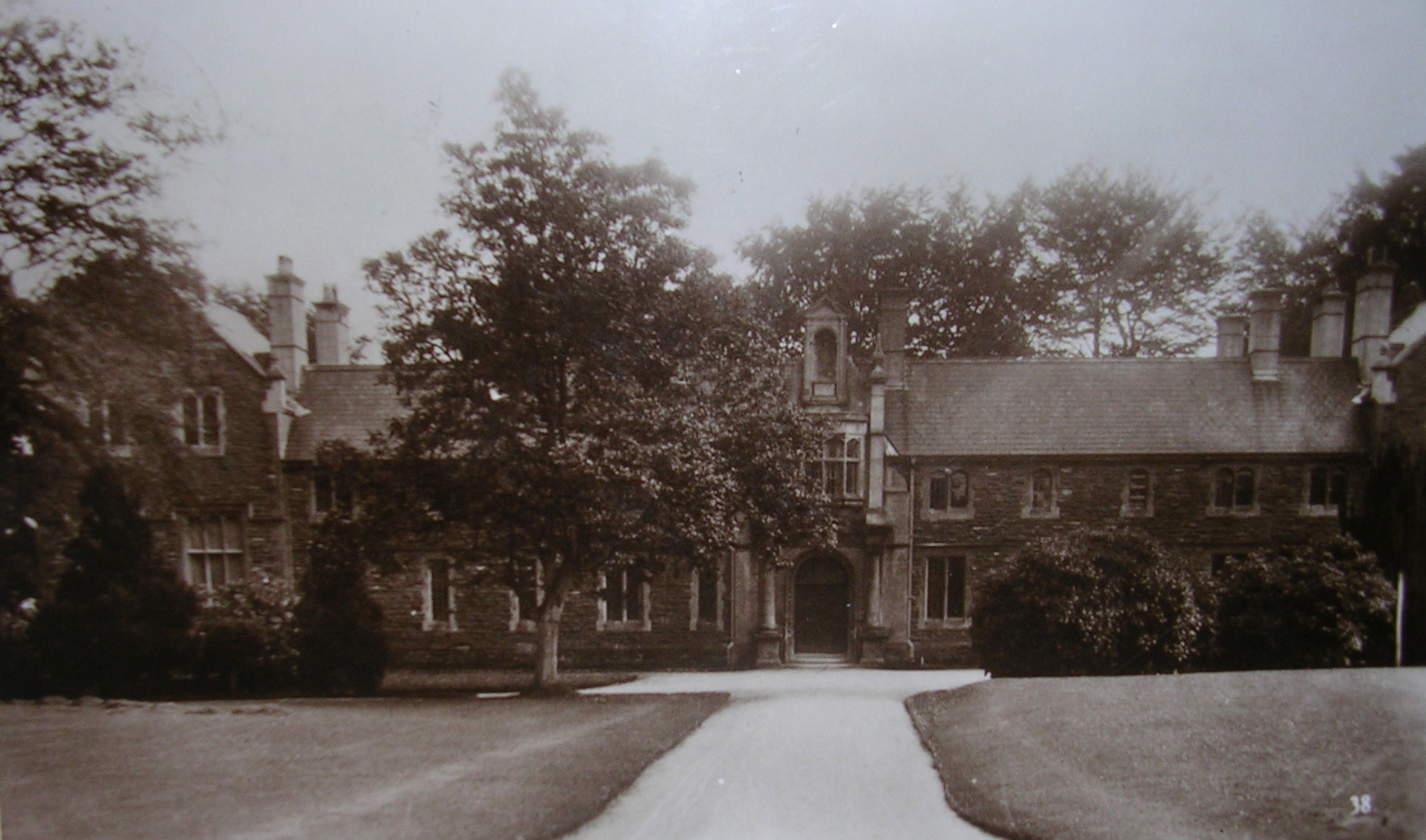
The Original Canterbury Building

The Canterbury Building was built to house a growing number of students at the end of the 19th century. The foundation stone was laid by the Archbishop of Canterbury in 1885 and the building was officially opened on 24 June 1887. It contained a physical science laboratory, two lecture rooms and new accommodation. However, structural problems forced the university to demolish the original building in the summer of 1971. The second Canterbury Building was opened on 20 October 1973 by the Vice-Chancellor of the University of Kent. It was demolished, and replaced with the present Canterbury Building, during the 2012–13 academic year.

The Main Library was opened on 7 July 1966 by the then Chancellor of the University of Wales, Prince Philip, Duke of Edinburgh. It was extended and then reopened by Charles, Prince of Wales on 21 June 1984.

The Arts Building was opened by Peter Thomas, Secretary of State for Wales on 4 October 1971, in time for it to house the new Geography department. The Archaeology and Anthropology department has since moved into the ground floor of the building, the first floor being shared by the Department of Film and Media and the Department of Management and I.T. The building now houses the new combined A.H.A (Archaeology, History and Anthropology) department.

The Cliff Tucker Theatre, on the banks of the River Dulas, was opened by Sir Anthony Hopkins in 1996 and contained teaching rooms, lecture theatres and a large computer room. It was named in honour of Cliff Tucker, a former student and benefactor of the university.

The Sheikh Khalifa Building, completed in 1997 and named after Sheikh Khalifa bin Zayed Al Nahyan, a benefactor of the university, was the home of the Department of Theology, Religious Studies and Islamic Studies, one of the largest departments of its kind in the United Kingdom. It was opened by Professor Sir Stewart Sutherland. Behind the departmental building is a small mosque, used by Muslim students and residents of the town.

The Roderic Bowen Research Centre, completed 2007 and named after Roderic Bowen, a former president of the university, houses the Founders' Library collection and archives and adjoins the main library building. The centre was opened on 17 October 2008, by First Minister for Wales, Rhodri Morgan.

The Confucius Institute opened in 2007, as the home of the university's department of Chinese Studies and had direct links to Chinese Cultural institutes.

Archaeology Laboratories provided facilities for environmental archaeology, osteoarchaeology, soil studies and conservation.

The Lloyd Thomas Refectory was the university's main dining hall, providing meals to guests and catered students and a regular Sunday carvery.

The Media centre contained studios and recording facilities.

Bishop Burgess Hall formerly housed the departments of Classics and Philosophy. In 2009 it was converted to become a hub for student services.

== Academic dress ==
A modern reproduction of the original Lampeter BA hood

From 1971, Lampeter awarded University of Wales degrees, and as such, the academic dress was that of the University of Wales – graduates wore a black stuff gown, with bell sleeves for bachelors, and glove sleeve for masters. Hoods were lined with mazarin blue shot green (arts), mazarin blue shot red (divinity), lined yellow shot black (MSc) and yellow shot red, bound light blue (MBA).

The Lampeter academic dress for the degrees it awarded in its own right differed from this as follows:

Undergraduates wore a black stuff gown, with bell-sleeves, with the whole sleeve split open in front. The year-round wearing of undergraduate academic dress ended in 1971 when Lampeter joined the University of Wales. However around 2006–10 there was some support for a resurrection of this tradition by current students.

Bachelor of Divinity. A black gown, of MA pattern (long closed sleeves), with a double crescent cut at the end of each sleeve. A black silk hood, lined with dark violet silk, and bound with 1" white silk. Originally, it could be made in either the Oxford or the Cambridge shape, but Cambridge became the norm.

Bachelor of Arts. A black stuff gown of Cambridge BA pattern. A black silk hood, part-lined and bound with 'miniver' – white fur with black spots. (Rabbit was usually used, with 'stick-on' spots, on account of the cost of real miniver!). As with the BD, it could be made in either the Oxford or the Cambridge shape, but Cambridge became the norm.

There was also a two-year course for those who could not afford the full three-year one. From 1884, this was called the Licence in Divinity (LD). Holders wore the undergraduate gown, with a black stuff hood, lined with black stuff, and bound for 1" with white silk. This was always Cambridge shape. The LD was not awarded after about 1940 and, in 1969, the hood was used for the DipTh, which was awarded until the college ceased clergy training in 1978. A degree with a similar title was introduced in 2007, the Licence in Divinity (Doctoral) (LicDD). This however, is a postdoctoral degree in theology or religious studies, the first of its kind in the UK. The academicals prescribed to this degree is non-conventional in that it consists of a scarlet mozzetta trimmed with white fur that is worn over the festal gown and under the hood (of the relevant Wales degree) and worn with a scarlet bonnet with white cord and tassels. The degree was only awarded for a brief time before it was dropped (2007–2011).

The university awarded a number of Licences in Theology (LTh), Religious Studies (LRS), Islamic Studies, Latin, and Classical Greek.

== Sports ==
The university has a sports hall with badminton and squash courts, and a multigym with weight training equipment. For outdoor sports, the university has tennis courts, a cricket field and facilities for football, hockey and rugby. The college cricket pavilion, opened officially on 1 May 1909 is now a listed building.

Lampeter has active fencing, netball, field hockey, football and rugby union teams, all of which played in the college colours of black and gold.

=== Rugby ===
Rugby was introduced to Lampeter by Vice-Principal Rowland Williams around 1850 and, as such, the college can claim to have the oldest Rugby football team in Wales. Despite some debate as to whether this honour belongs to the town team or the university side, the Welsh Rugby Union's official history "Fields of Praise: The Official History of the Welsh Rugby Union, 1881–1981" indicates the college team as the first. However, Lampeter Town RFC were the representatives of Lampeter at the formation of the WRU in 1881.

The red strip worn by Wales is one of the university's original strips and, as such, the college team is the only other club permitted to wear it. The club was one of the founder members of the Welsh Rugby Union in 1881 but, following trouble at a match against the University College of Wales, Aberystwyth in 1933, was reprimanded by the union.

The club's nicknames were Mad Pilgrims and Fighting Parsons, reflecting Lampeter's history of training clergy. A match was played between the student team and an old boys (graduate) team on the first Saturday in December each year. In recent years, the old boys formed a touring side known as Old Parsonians RFC. The old boys have become known for their battle cry "chuff", which came into common use c. 2001. Old Parsonians play in a sky blue and white kit in recognition of the historical rugby link to Cambridge rugby through Rowland Williams.

== Student life ==
Three full-time sabbatical officers and ten non-sabbatical officers oversaw student entertainment, welfare and childcare, as well as ensuring that the views of Lampeter students were represented on a national level, through affiliation with the National Union of Students. However, by 2015, this had been cut to one sabbatical officer and 16 non-sabbatical officers. The Students' Union also published a popular satirical magazine entitled 1822 which "blends satire, pointlessness and toilet humour".

The secluded rural location lends the campus a special atmosphere and a very high proportion of the students were involved in clubs, societies and associations. There were over 30 recognised bodies, ranging from the Chinese Society and the International Students' Association to Medieval Re-enactment, Fencing Club and Organic Gardening Society. Alongside these were student-run bodies not affiliated with the Students' Union, such as the Christian Union, Conservative Future and Amnesty.

There has been no train service to the town since the local line fell victim to the Beeching Axe in 1965 and only limited bus services remain. However for many who came there, this was a key attraction, with a high proportion of students getting involved with outdoor activities and local environmental projects. Local country towns of Carmarthen and Llandeilo are nearby as well as the coastal resorts of Aberystwyth and New Quay. The union building, on the banks of the Afon Dulas and extended in 1998, contains a student bar and small club, known as the Xtension, which hosts parties and live music events; the Union also has a CineClub showing films in the Arts Hall and Cliff Tucker Theatre.

== Notable academics ==
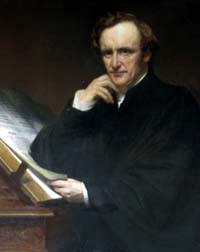
Reverend Professor Rowland Williams

- Professor Emeritus Nigel Yates (Theology)
- Reverend Professor Paul Badham (Theology)
- Professor David Cockburn (Philosophy)
- Rabbi Professor Dan Cohn-Sherbok (Jewish Studies)
- Professor Tim Cresswell (Geography)
- Doctor Dic Edwards (English)
- Reverend Islwyn Ffowc Elis (Welsh)
- Professor Harold Arthur Harris (Latin and Greek)
- Professor Johannes Hoff (Theology)
- Professor Chris Philo (Geography)
- Professor Michael Shanks (Archaeology)
- Doctor Laurie Thompson (Swedish)
- Professor Nigel Thrift (Geography)
- Professor Thomas Frederick Tout (History)
- Reverend Professor Rowland Williams (Hebrew, also Vice-Principal of the college)

== Academic departments ==
The academic departments at the time of the merger were:

- Chinese Studies
- Classics
- Film and Media
- English
- Management and Information Technology
- Philosophy
- Theology, Religious Studies and Islamic Studies
- Voluntary Sector Studies
- Archaeology, History and Anthropology

=== Defunct departments ===
- Physical Science
- Mathematics
- Geography
  - Centre for Australian Studies in Wales
- Modern Languages (French, German and Swedish)
- History (due to merging of departments)
- Archaeology and Anthropology (due to merging of departments)
- Welsh – no longer taught at undergraduate level

=== Lampeter Geography School ===
The Lampeter Geography School was an important collection of academics based at the Geography department of the University of Wales, Lampeter. The department has since closed, but the Lampeter diaspora continues to have a major impact on the academic discipline.

The Robbins Report of 1963 recommended immediate expansion of British universities. In its implementation of these recommendations, Lampeter planned to open new Economics and Geography departments. Economics was taught at first-year level only. The groundwork was well in place for the Geography department to open by 1970 or 1971. The new Arts Building of the university was opened by the Secretary of State for Wales on 4 October 1971, which provided the new department with luxurious lecture and teaching rooms in time for its opening. Dr David Thomas (not to be confused with David SG Thomas, professor at Oxford) became the first professor of geography at Lampeter in 1970 and, in 1971, Donald A Davidson and John A Dawson joined the staff as lecturers, ready to welcome the first geography students to Lampeter in October 1971.

== See also ==
- List of universities in Wales
- List of alumni of University of Wales, Lampeter
- List of academics of University of Wales, Lampeter
- List of vice-chancellors of the University of Wales, Trinity Saint David

== Bibliography ==
- D. T. W. Price, A History of Saint David's University College, Lampeter; Volume One, to 1898. Cardiff: University of Wales Press (ISBN 0-7083-0606-3); Volume Two 1898–1971 Cardiff: University of Wales Press (ISBN 0-7083-1062-1).
- D. T. W. Price, Yr Esgob Burgess a Choleg Llanbedr: Bishop Burgess and Lampeter College. Cardiff: University of Wales Press (ISBN 0-7083-0965-8).
- Nicholas Groves Academical Robes of Saint David's College Lampeter (1822–1971), (University of Wales, Lampeter Special Publications) (ISBN 0-905285-68-9).
