= Elined Prys =

Welsh psychoanalyst and pacifist (1895–1983)

- Born: 16 February 1895; Trefeca
- Died: 30 June 1983 (aged 88); Newtown
- Spouse(s): Walter Kotschnig
- Parent(s): Owen Prys

Elined Prys (alternate spelling: Eluned Pryce; 16 February 1895 – 30 June 1983), also known as Elined Prys Kotschnig, was a Welsh Jungian psychoanalyst and Quaker pacifist.

Born in Wales, Elined Prys studied psychology at Aberystwyth and then became involved in relief work in Europe with student Christian groups. In 1924, she was part of the delegation that delivered the Women's Peace Petition to President Coolidge in the USA. The same year, she married Walter Kotschnig. She studied Jungian psychoanalysis in Geneva and was interested in the intersection with Quaker beliefs. She moved to the USA in 1936, where she worked as a psychoanalyst. She founded the Friends Conference on the Nature and Laws of the Spiritual Life and was editor of the Quaker magazine, Inward Light.

== Early life ==
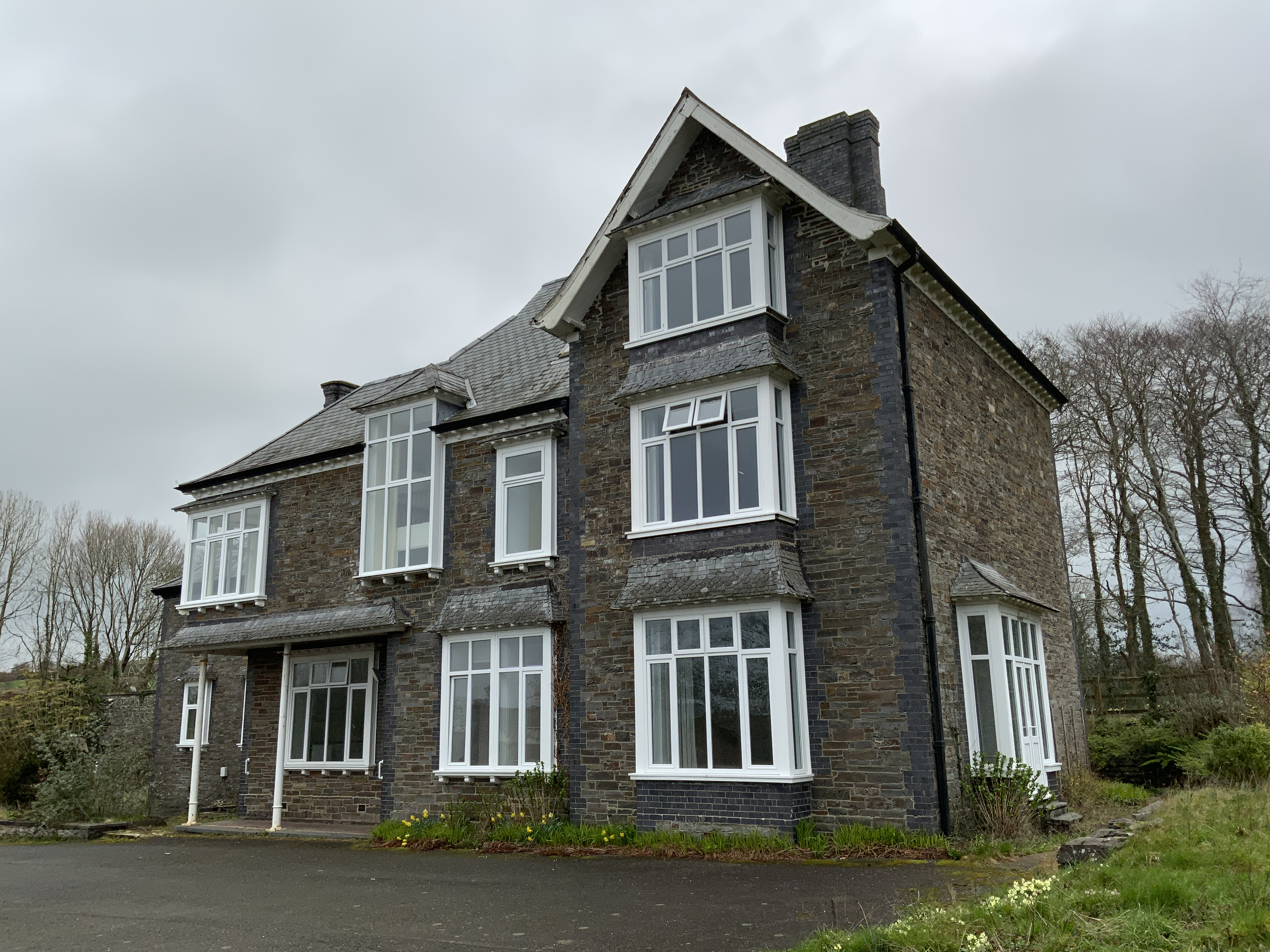
Plas Lluest, Elined Prys' home in Waun Fawr, Aberystwyth

Elined Prys was born on 16 February 1895 in Trefeca to Owen Prys and Elizabeth Parry.

In January 1918, while at university, she planned a conference in Aberystwyth to discuss The Best Pathway to Peace, where supporters of World War I and pacifists could discuss a Christian view on peace. It was cancelled due to "hooliganism threats".

Later that year, she graduated in philosophy from the University of Wales, Aberystwyth. She then went to study at Newnham College, Cambridge.

== Career ==
In 1920, she led the World Student Christian's relief work with refugees of World War I. This took her to Vienna, where she met Walter Kotschnig, her future husband.

Elined Prys spent three years working in Bucharest to establish a student branch of the World Young Women's Christian Association. Her experiences were published in the Student Christian Movement's Yr Efrydydd.

On 2 February 1924, Elined Prys sailed from Liverpool to New York as part of a delegation for the Welsh Women's Peace Appeal from the Welsh League of Nations Union. On 19 February 1924, they delivered the Women's Peace Petition from the Women of Wales to the Women of America at an event with Eleanor Roosevelt and Carrie Chapman Catt in attendance. The delegation also presented a copy of the petition to President Coolidge. The petition document was deposited at the Smithsonian Museum. It had been signed by 390,296 Welsh women.

In 1925, she moved to Geneva, where she worked as a secretary for the International Student Service. In 1932, she co-edited, along with her husband, a volume for the group called The University in a Changing World.

In the early 1930s, she was working in the field of psychoanalysis with Tina Keller-Jenny. She established a group studying the intersection of Jungian psychology and Quaker beliefs, and the group visited Jung at his home in June 1935.

She moved to the USA in the autumn of 1936, after her husband's criticism of Hitler made it impossible to remain in Europe, where she lived in Northampton, MA. There she campaigned for the USA to join the League of Nations and, on behalf of the American Friends Service Committee, to support Dutch refugees.

She was a founder and former chairman of the Friends Conference on Religion and Psychology (originally called the Friends Conference on the Nature and Laws of the Spiritual Life) and, from 1950, editor of their publication called Inward Light. She published many articles in the magazine, including Quakers and C. G. Jung (1975).

In 1944, she moved to Chevy Chase, MD, near Washington D.C., when her husband began working for the government. After World War II, she attended the Jung Institute in Zurich to qualify as a psychoanalyst, and then established a private practice as an analytical psychologist in Washington. In 1967, she co-founded a local chapter of the C.G. Jung Working Group.

She retired around 1979.

== Personal life ==
Elined Prys married Walter Kotschnig on 10 December 1924 at the Welsh chapel of the Presbyterian Church in London. They had three children; she was survived by two of them.

She joined the Society of Friends in 1927, establishing meetings in Northampton, MA in 1938, and was still a member at her death.

Despite living elsewhere for more than 60 years, she felt a strong hiraeth and connection to Wales.

== Death ==
Elined Prys Kotschnig died on 30 June 1983, aged 88, following a stroke at a Quaker retirement facility in Newtown.

== Legacy ==
Elined's family donated her personal letters from 1919–1924 to the National Library of Wales.

In 2024, the Senedd paid tribute to the centenary of the Women's Peace Petition.
