= Bethany Chapel, Ammanford =

Chapel in Ammanford, Carmarthenshire, Wales

Coordinates: 51°47′28″N 3°59′27″W

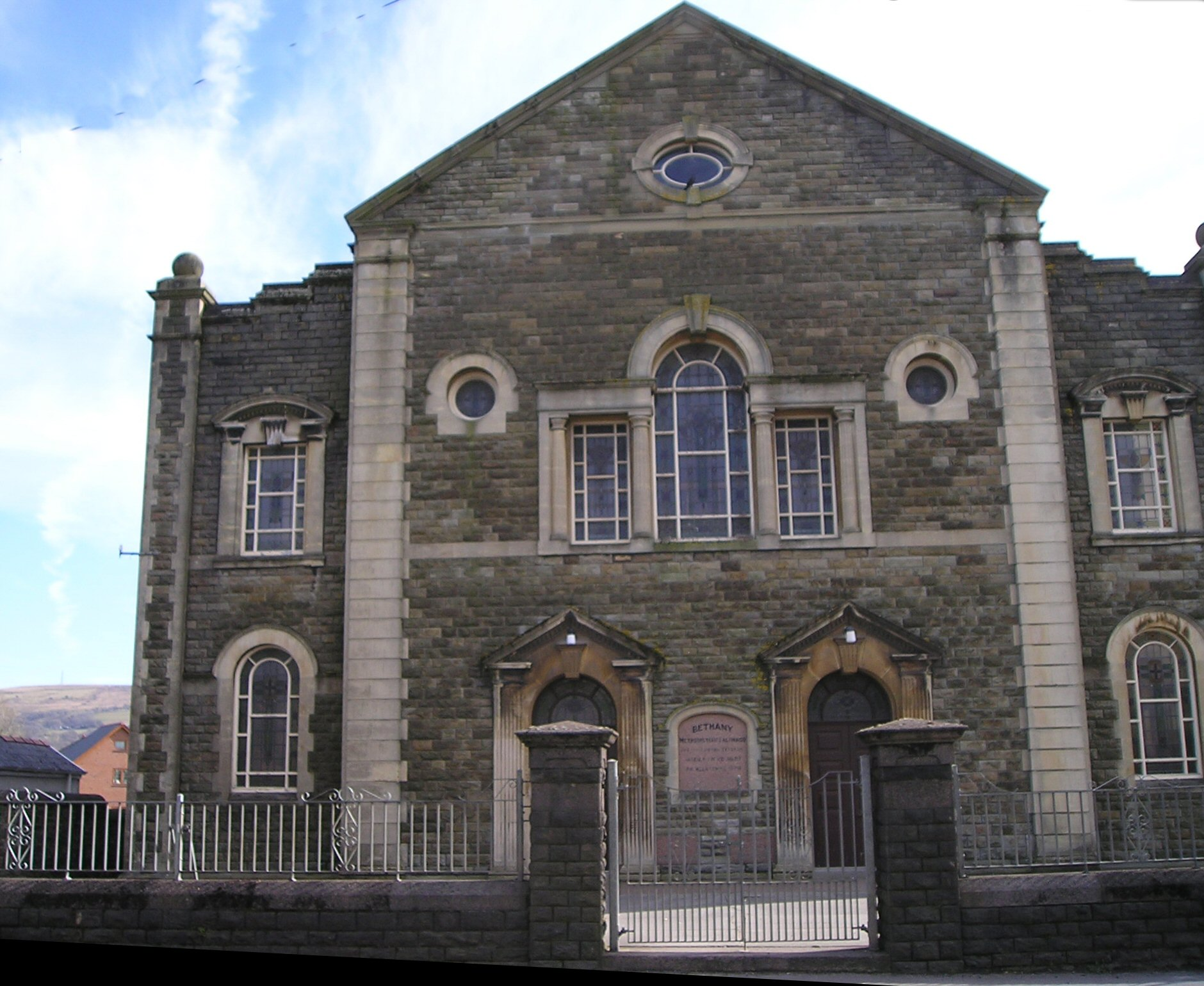
The second Bethany Chapel, opened in October 1929

Bethany was a Calvinistic Methodist/ Presbyterian Church of Wales chapel in Ammanford, Carmarthenshire, Wales, from 1881 to 2023.

Services were conducted in Welsh, despite some members of the original founding committee proposing an English language chapel. This might explain the English name 'Bethany'.

Bethany is notable for its experiences during the 1904-1905 revival and for three significant ministries: W. Nantlais Williams, J.D. Williams and Gareth Davies.

John T. Job, the Welsh hymnwriter and one of the leaders of the 1904-1905 revival in Bethesda, was from Llandybie; his mother, Mary, was one of the original members of Bethany Chapel and was notable for her godly character. J.T. Job was the first preacher to be sent out from Bethany into the ministry, in the 1880s. He composed the Welsh hymn "Cofia'r byd, O Feddyg da" ("Remember the world, O good Doctor").

W. Nantlais Williams also founded the Cynhadledd y Sulgwyn (Whitsun Convention). Based in Bethany from 1917 until the beginning of the 21st century, it drew people from all over Wales to hear powerful, biblical preaching.

Following a vote of the members in July 2023 the Calvinistic Methodist/ Presbyterian Church of Wales cause at Bethany was officially decommissioned by the local presbytery on October 26, 2023. There might be uncertainty regarding the future of the building but the same gospel message of Jesus Christ preached at Bethany is still being proclaimed in the Ammanford area.

== Origins ==
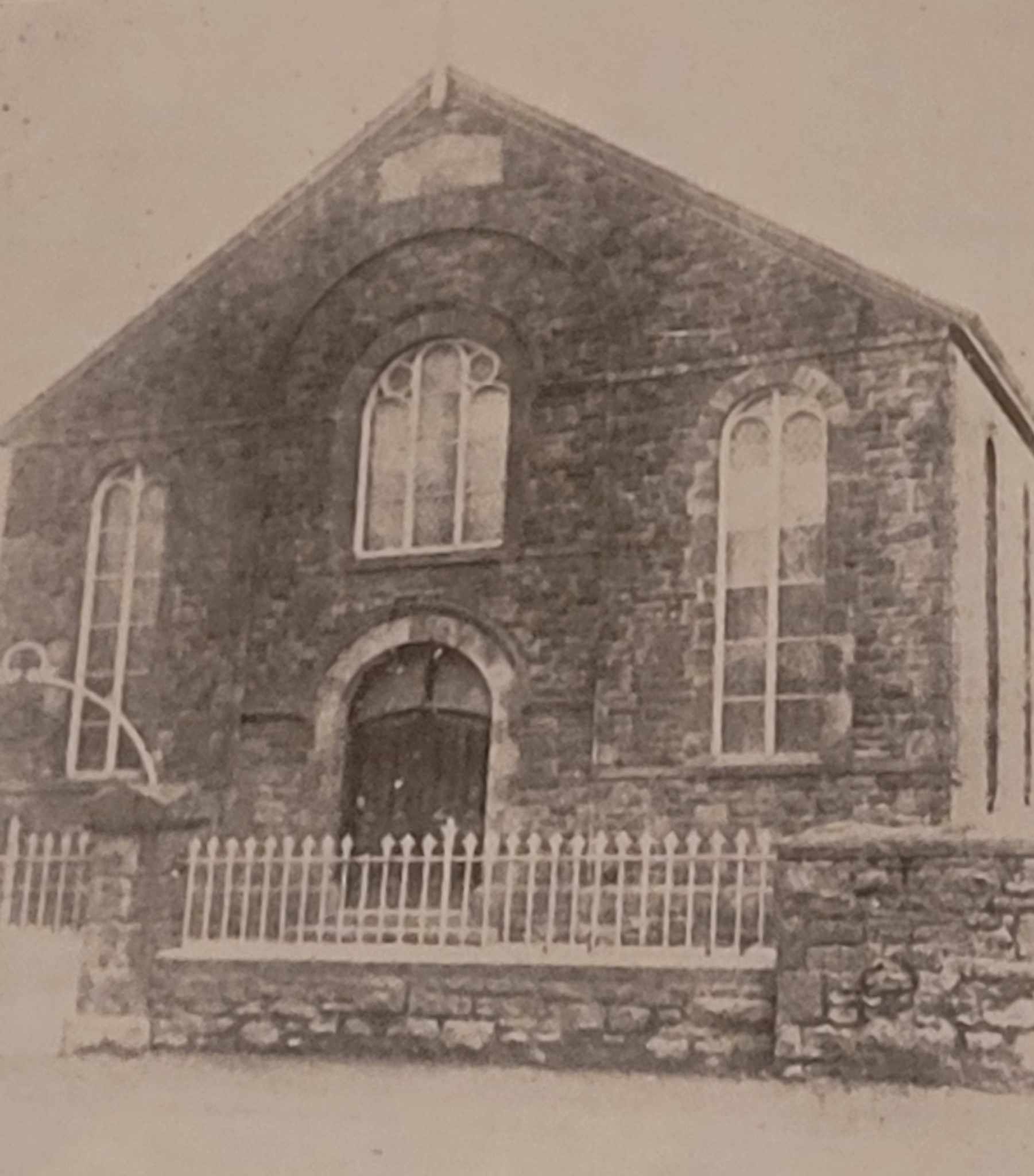
The first Bethany Chapel, opened in May 1881

Bethany's roots were not actually in Ammanford, but in an older branch of the Methodist cause across the river Aman in the parish of Betws: Seion Chapel. The home of Hopkin John, "Argoed" house in Betws, became the cradle of both the local Welsh Independents (Annibynwyr) and Methodists in 1748 when it was "registered a place for dissenting protestants". Howell Harris preached there at least once, in 1740. Seion Methodist Chapel emerged from this community and by the middle of the 19th century some of the members felt a need to start a new chapel in the growing town of Cross Inn (soon to be renamed Ammanford in 1883).

The vision of a new chapel was originally presented in a monthly meeting of the local presbytery in 1875. A committee was formed and land acquired in Wind Street from Lord Dynevor. The new chapel was built at a cost of £900 and the first service was held in May 1881.

Reverend W. Landeg Powell, the minister of Seion Chapel, became the first minister of Bethany Calvinistic Methodist Chapel. He was subsequently called to a chapel in Nantymoel in 1889. After a long period without a minister, Reverend Rhys Jones was called in 1894.

Rhys Jones was originally from Brechfa, and had been a minister in Cefncoedcymer near Merthyr Tydfil. He was an effective minister who established the tradition of biblical preaching in Bethany, and also started the weekly Bible class and Gobeithlu (Band of Hope).^{[16]} Rhys Jones' ministry was tragically cut short by illness and death at the age of 33 in 1896.^{[16]}

== W. Nantlais Williams and the 1904-1905 revival ==
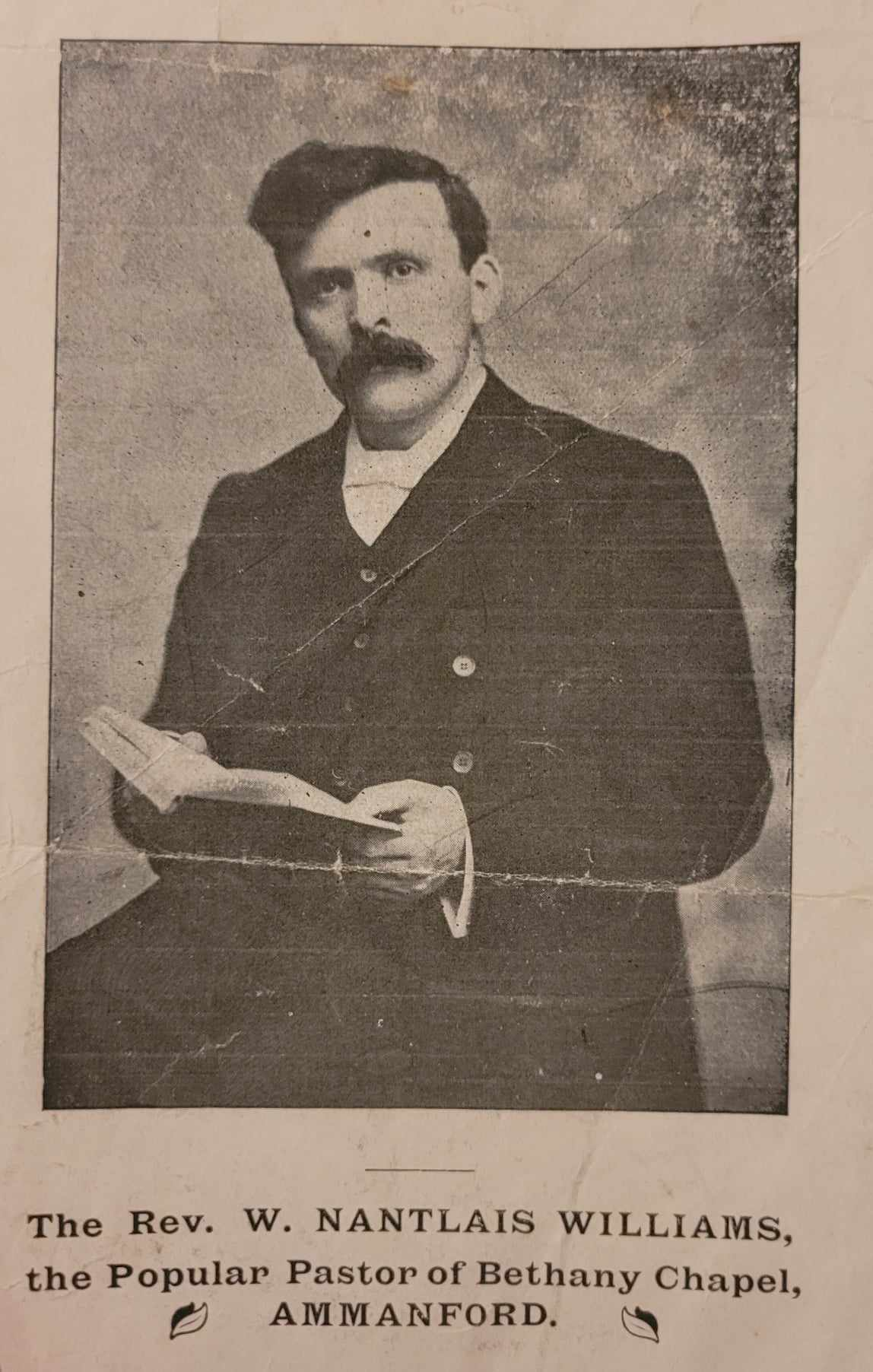
A young W. Nantlais Williams (minister from 1900-1944)

W. Nantlais Williams (1874-1959) was born in Llawrcwrt, a cottage in the village of Gwyddgrug, near Pencader; the youngest of ten children.

At the age of twenty he started to preach and in 1895 he went to the prestigious grammar school in Newcastle Emlyn and from there to Trefeca College to train as a minister. Before he finished his studies, however, he received a call to be minister of Bethany in 1900.

Originally, Nantlais' ambition was to be a popular poet-preacher, and at that he was already successful. He was a well sought after speaker at conferences and his Welsh poetry won him various prizes including several bardic chairs, including the Ammanford Eisteddfod in 1899 and the chair of the National Eisteddfod of Wales in 1902.

November 1904

Nantlais was profoundly affected by the events of 4-6 November 1904, the weekend that the revival broke out in Ammanford. He would later say that his life was divided into two parts – "Before the Revival" and "After the Revival".

He was first stirred by the gospel message a few months previously, while listening to W.H. Lane preach in Heol Dwr Chapel, Carmarthen. However it was when Joseph Jenkins came to Bethany as a visiting preacher in November 1904 that he experienced spiritual conversion. Joseph Jenkins preached on Sunday, November 6 and in the afternoon the chapel was full to hear the preacher recount stories of the waves of conversions in New Quay and Blaenannerch since February that year. One of the members, Henry James, unexpectedly announced that "a prayer meeting will be held here tomorrow night". A lecture in the vestry by the esteemed poet Gwili even had to be cut short that Monday evening, such was the sound of the singing from the chapel. Another meeting was held on the Tuesday, where a young girl stood up to pray and the chapel was set ablaze with the singing of praise and much prayer until 2:30 am. On the Friday evening Nantlais was humbled by his own sin and self-righteousness and felt miserable until he heard the words of the hymn – "Diolch Iddo byth am gofio llwch y llawr" ('Thank You forever for remembering the dust of the ground') – and experienced a sudden peace and the joy of forgiveness and salvation.

Effects of the revival

The number of baptisms multiplied in Bethany, and the membership would climb to over 500 by Nantlais' retirement in 1944. Two other chapels were established in two years - Peniel, Pantyffynnon (1905), and Elim, Tir-y-Dail (1906).

From November 1904 Nantlais abandoned some of his preaching conferences and concentrated on his ministry at Bethany. He also gave up all involvement in competitive eisteddfodau to concentrate on pastoral work. This was reflected elsewhere, with new converts giving up hobbies and sports to focus on the family and church; even Ammanford RFC was disbanded until 1907.

"Bookshops complained of the inadequacy of their supply of Bibles. The coal mines were transformed by the sound of praise in the place of blasphemous oaths. The public houses were empty of rowdy customers and the homes were full of joy and singing."

By the 1920s the chapel was too small, and a decision to rebuild was taken in 1927. Bethany was re-opened in October 1929 with a new seating capacity of 800 and room for another 300 in the adjoining vestry. The work was completed by William Evans, a local contractor and member of the Ammanford Urban District Council. J.T. Job and a young Dr Martyn Lloyd Jones were among the preachers at the opening services.

Nantlais may have stopped competing at eisteddfodau, however he continued to compose popular Welsh hymns; 17 of which are in "Caneuon Ffydd". As the editor of Trysorfa'r Plant (The Children's Treasury) from 1933 to 1946 he was able to publish many of his children's hymns.

== J.D. Williams and young people's blessing ==
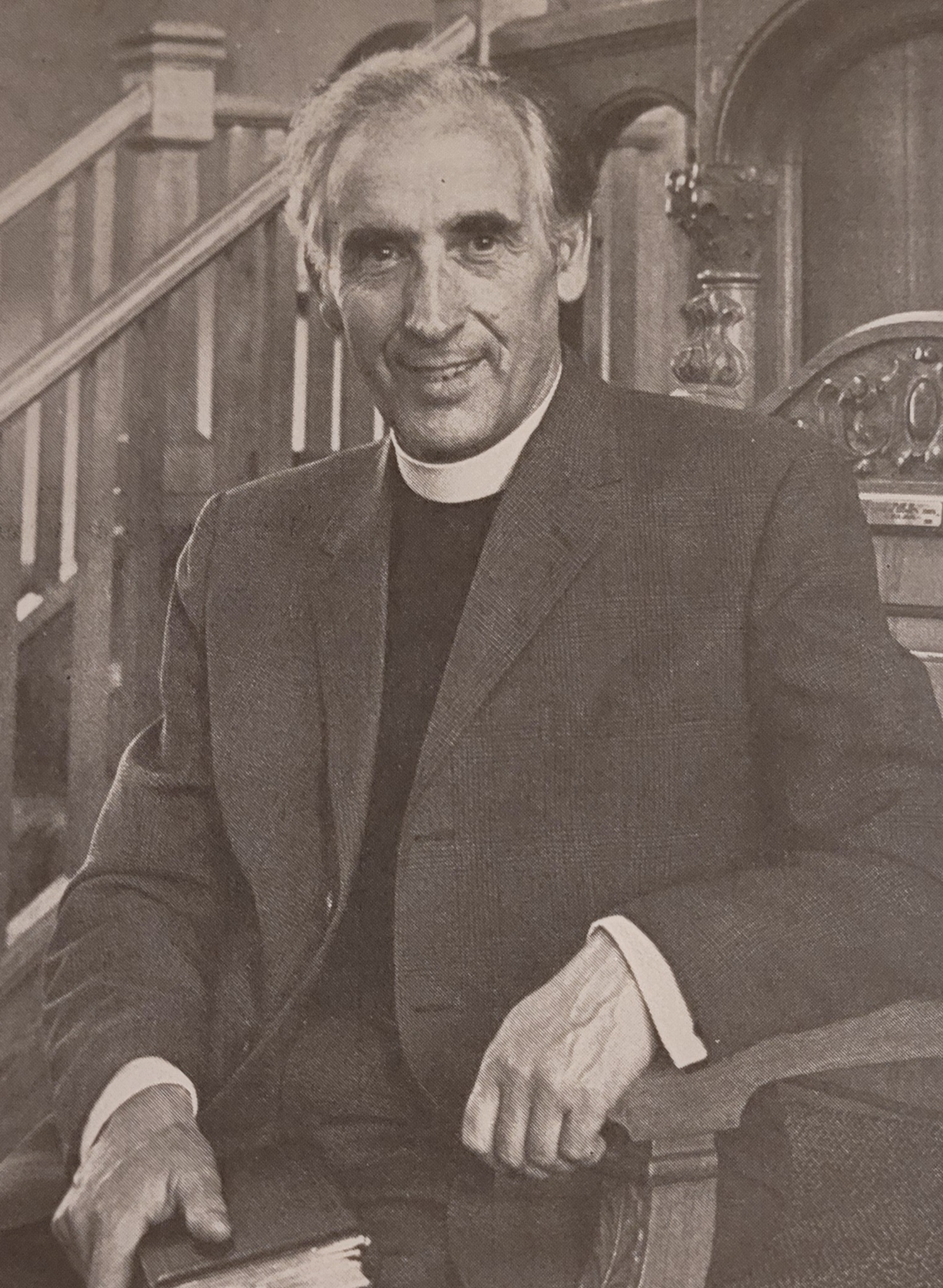
Reverend J.D Williams (minister 1944-1981)

W. Nantlais Williams retired in 1944 and continued as a member until 1959. In his final letter as minister, he wrote the following words:

The new minister, Reverend J.D Williams, will start work in mid September, but I will remain a member of Bethany, and we will do our best – you and I – to stand with the new minister. He is a young man, and I'm sure you will be fond of him and his young wife – August 1944

John Daniel "Jac" (J.D.) Williams (1915-2006) was originally from Penuwch, Ceredigion, and had been a minister in Llangyfelach before being called to Bethany in 1944. He would be a minister for 37 years, until his retirement in 1981.

One member voted against the appointment, to which Nantlais responded that he had experienced the same fate himself, with a solitary vote against him in 1900 – "Perhaps an elderly brother did not understand the voting system", he quipped.

Experience of God

Strangely, like Nantlais, J.D Williams also sensed early on in his ministry that he "was foreign to the true experience of God so many at Bethany had known". This caused him much spiritual discomfort until the church held an evangelism crusade in 1946 with a number of young preachers from the Llanelli area. "The minister himself was affected by the message and as a result a stronger foundation was given to his preaching and a greater motivation to his work as a minister."

J.D. Williams was a warm, clear and effective preacher, and one evident fruit of this was the number of preachers sent out from Bethany, and at least four missionaries – Huxley Thomas (Khasi Hill), Anna Hopkins (Shillong), Ewart Jones (Argentina and Canada) and Colin Nicholas (Congo).

The Corlan y Plant and Gobeithlu (Band of Hope) flourished during his ministry and the young people's society experienced many waves of blessing too. The "Sisterhood" was also vibrant, led by Mrs Tom Roberts (Nain) and Mrs Olwen Williams, wife of J.D.Williams.

== Gareth H. Davies and the changing face of society ==
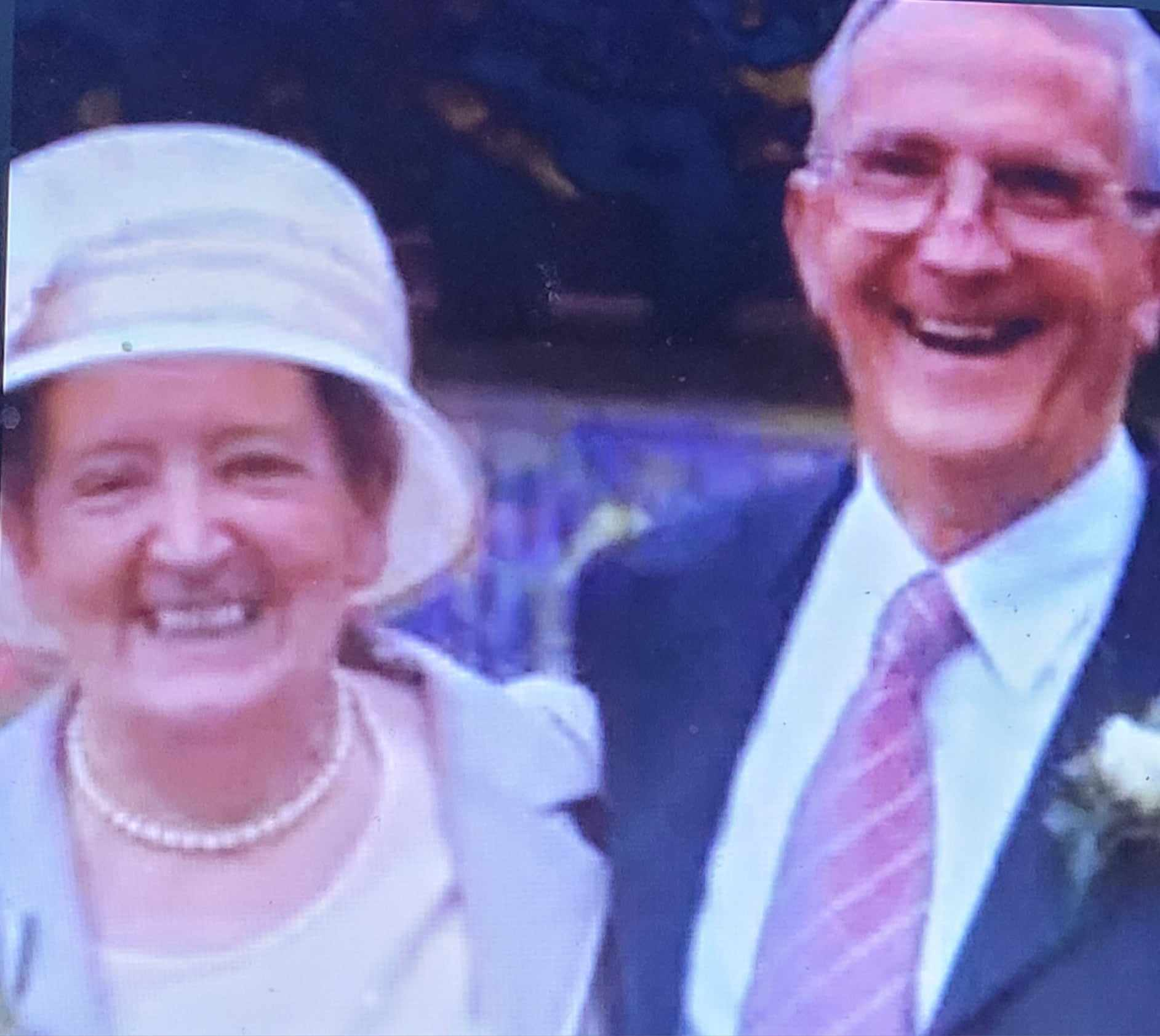
Reverend Gareth Davies (minister 1982-1994), and his wife, Eunice, nee Morris

Eunice Morris, a child of Bethany, was converted on the same night as J.D. Williams in 1946. By God's providence, her future husband, the Reverend Gareth H. Davies (1927-2005), would be called to succeed J.D. Williams as minister in 1982, having previously been a minister in Pontardawe and Llanelli. "He preached with theological discernment, earnest longing for the salvation of men and women, unavoidable application and a Welsh warmth of spirit."

Bethany faced many challenges by the 1980s, with many young people having to move away to find work; and many cultural changes. In 1986 and 1987 the church experienced a difficult season, with the loss of five of the elders.

Reverend Meurig Dodd was the fifth and final minister, retiring in 2001. The period without a minister was not without blessing however, with some conversions and dear elderly Christians upheld in their final days. Gaynor Jones' faithful commitment was a valuable contribution in the final years.

Following a vote of the members in July 2023 the Calvinistic Methodist/ Presbyterian Church of Wales cause at Bethany was officially decommissioned by the local presbytery on October 26, 2023. Fittingly, Stephen Nantlais Williams, grandson of Nantlais, gave the final address, based on Romans 11:33-36. There might be uncertainty regarding the future of the building but the same gospel message of Jesus Christ preached at Bethany is still being proclaimed in the Ammanford area.

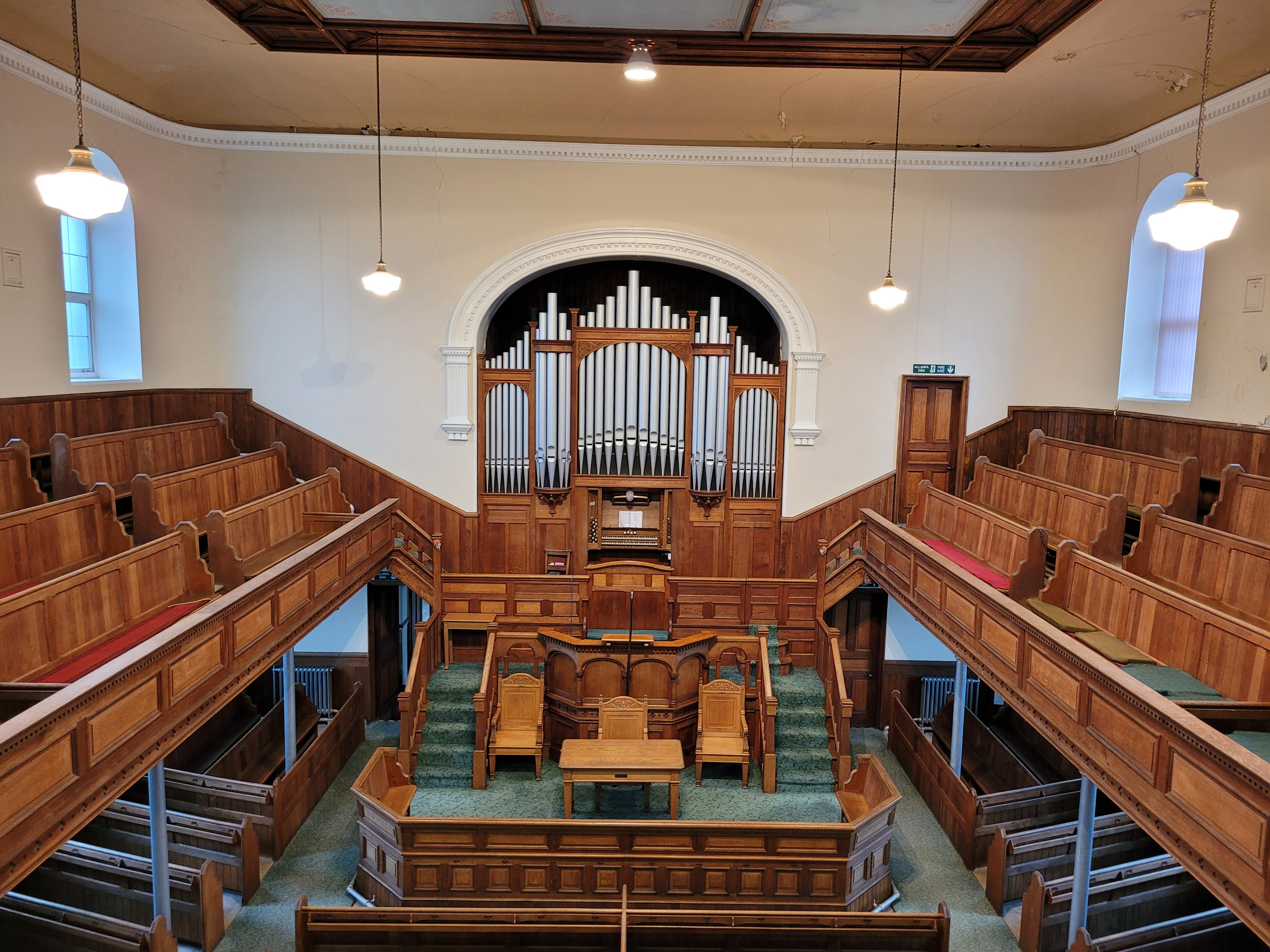
Inside Bethany Chapel in 2023

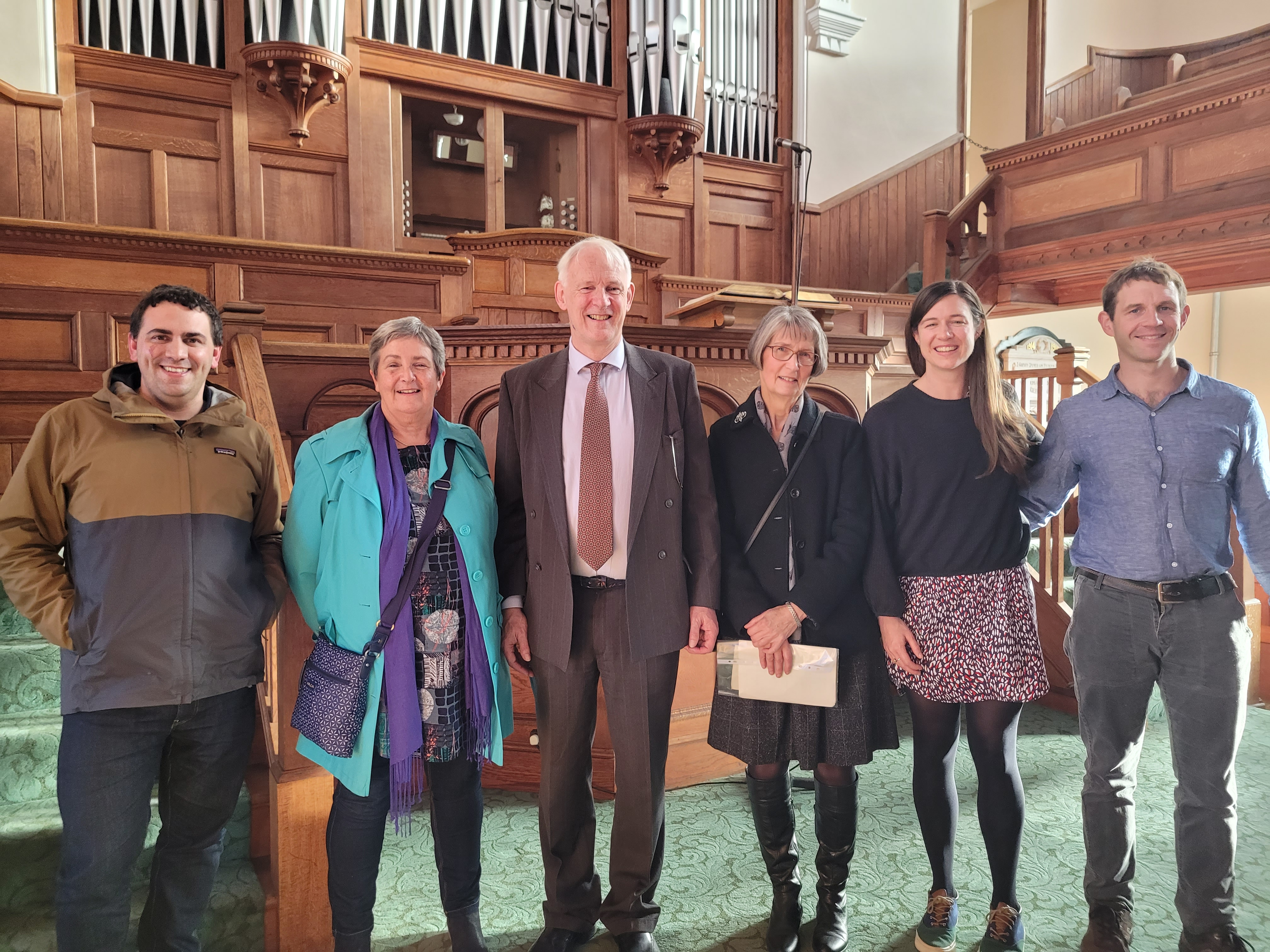
Members of the families of Nantlais, J.D Williams and Gareth Davies at the decommissioning service

== Sources ==
- Lock Smith, W. T. H. (1999). Ammanford. Origin of Street Names & Notable Historical Records. Carmarthenshire County Council. ISBN 0906821371.
