= Nantlais Williams =

Nantlais Williams

William Nantlais Williams (30 December 1874 – 18 June 1959), better known simply as Nantlais, was a Welsh poet and a Presbyterian Christian minister who played a prominent role in the 1904-1905 Welsh Revival.

== Background ==
Williams was born in Pencader, Carmarthenshire, the youngest of ten children. He received his elementary education at Ysgol y Bwrdd, New Inn, but because of the death of his brother he had to leave when he was twelve to take up an apprenticeship as a weaver.

At the age of twenty he started to preach and in 1895 he went to the prestigious Grammar School in Newcastle Emlyn. From there he went on to Trefeca College to train as a minister, but before he finished his studies he received a call to be minister of Bethany, Ammanford, in 1900 and was ordained by the denomination (Presbyterian Church of Wales) in 1901. By 1902 he was married to Alice Maud Jones, a relative to J. T. Job, another leader of the 1904-1905 Welsh Revival. They had three children, including Rheinallt Nantlais Williams. His grandson is Stephen Nantlais Williams. His first wife died in 1911 and he married his second wife, Annie Price, a teacher, in 1916. Bethany, Ammanford was to be his only post as he stayed there until his retirement in 1944. He is buried in front of Bethany, Ammanford, next to J. T. Job and Gareth Davies.

== Nantlais and the 1904-1905 Revival ==
Nantlais Williams in 1904

Nantlais came heavily under the influence of the 1904-1905 Welsh Revival. In 1904 he was eager to be a popular poet-preacher, and at that he was already successful. He was a well sought after speaker at conferences all over Wales and his Welsh language poetry won him various prizes including several bardic chairs and a prize for six lyrical poems at the National Eisteddfod in 1902. Despite this success and popularity he came to feel that there was more to Christianity than being involved in the formal ministry and being culturally active.

Nantliais came to believe that, until the 1904-1905 Welsh Revival, he has not fully engaged as a Christian minister. He was profoundly affected by the events of 4–6 November 1904, the weekend that the Revival broke out in Ammanford. From that weekend onwards Nantlais abandoned some of his preaching conferences and concentrated on his ministry at Bethany, Ammanford, which became a centre of the revival. He also put an end to his competitive work for the Eisteddfod.

== Nantlais the Writer ==
Although he had given up the Eisteddfod by the end of 1904 he did not stop writing altogether. From 1904 onwards he largely concentrated on producing Christian literature. He was co-editor of Yr Efengylydd (The Evangelist) between 1916–1933 and Y Lladmerydd (The Interpreter) between 1922 and 1926. He was editor of Trysorfa’r Plant (Children's Treasury) between 1934 and 1947. He was an important hymn writer; 13 of his hymns were included in his denomination's Llyfyr Emynau (Common Hymn Book) in 1927, and 17 were included in Caneuon Ffydd (Songs of Faith) released as recently as 2001. He was awarded for his work by the University of Wales when he received an honorary MA in 1958.

== Standing against liberal theology ==
Nantlais was living in an age that saw Wales, as a whole, turn against its traditional Calvinistic theology. Secularism was getting a stronger grip on the people of Wales and Nantlais' denomination was loosening its grip on the Doctrinal Basis they had since the Welsh Methodist revival. Nantlais ferociously opposed a report to restructure the denomination after the First World War because it included the possibility of letting go, or at least the loosening of the theology given down to them from the Methodist fathers. Nantlais published a series of articles in Goleuad (the denomination's newsletter), later put together as a book, in which he criticized the moves of 1925 and attacked modernists within the Church that challenge the authority of scripture.

== Conclusion ==
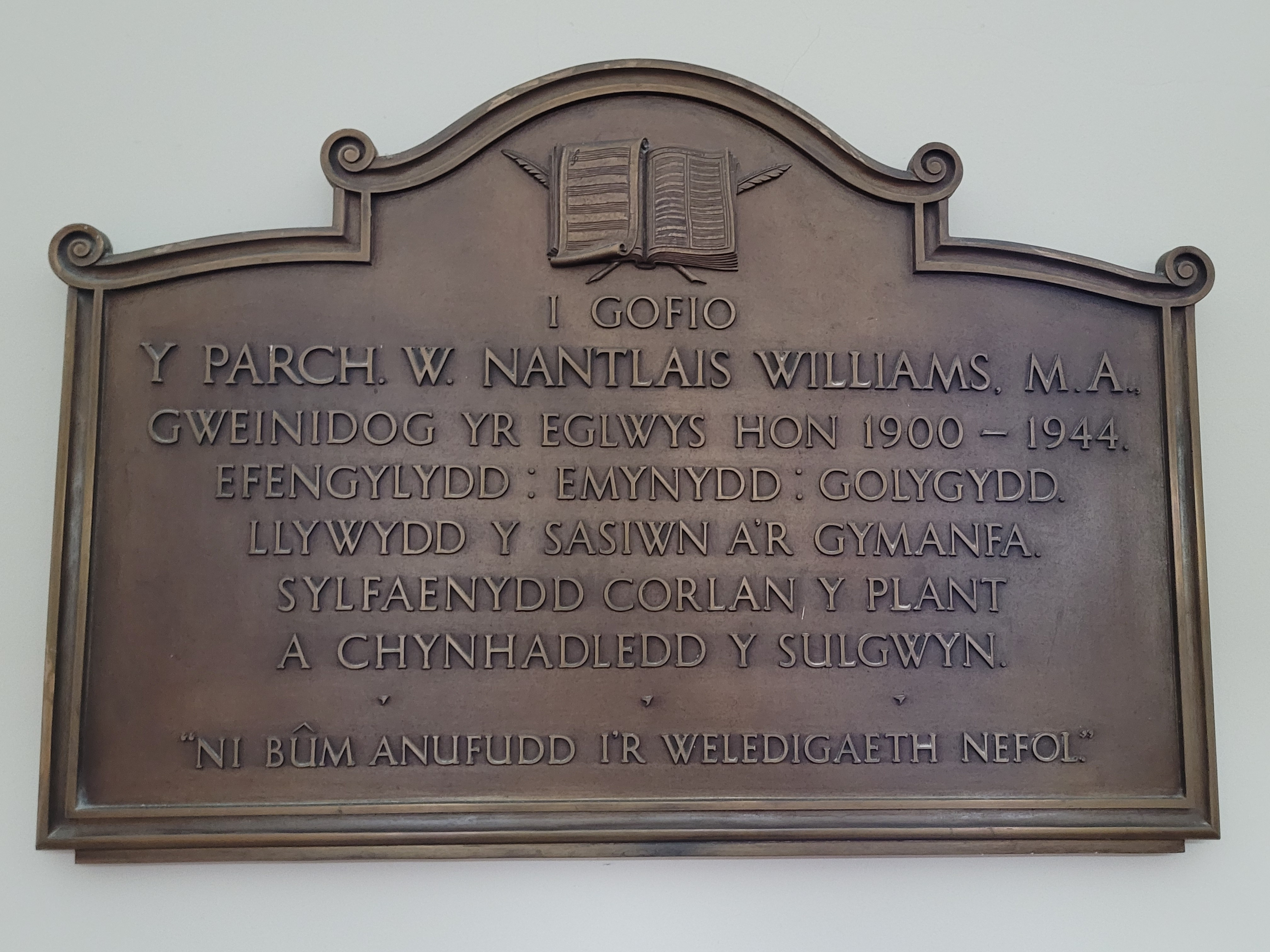
Memorial plaque to Nantlais, in Bethany Chapel

1904 was a turning point for Nantlais Williams. From there onwards his life changed and certainly his ministry changed. If there would be one criticism of him it would be his leniency towards the teaching of the Pietistic movement but the Welsh Methodist tradition held him from going to the extremes of some associated with the Keswick movement. He was an important hymn writer and will be seen in the line of descent of the Protestant Calvinistic Welsh tradition.

== See also ==
- Religion in the United Kingdom

== Sources ==
- Gibbard, Noel: Nefol Dân – Agweddau ar ddiwygiad 1904-1905 : 2004
