= John Tudno Williams =

Welsh theologian

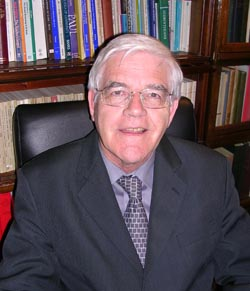
Williams in 2007

John Tudno Williams FLSW (born 31 December 1938) was the Moderator of the Presbyterian Church of Wales from 2006 to 2007 and the Principal of the United Theological College, Aberystwyth, from 1998 to 2003.

== Early career ==
John Tudno Williams was born in 1938 in Flint, the son of Arthur Tudno Williams, a minister in the Presbyterian Church of Wales and an alumnus of Jesus College, Oxford, and Primrose (née Hughes Parry). He was educated at the Liverpool Institute High School for Boys in Liverpool and Colfe's Grammar School in London. Williams studied theology at Jesus College, Oxford like his father before him, graduating in 1960. On leaving Oxford, he registered as a research student in the Classics Department of University College of Wales, Aberystwyth, whilst studying at the same time at the United Theological College, Aberystwyth, in preparation for ministry in the Presbyterian Church of Wales. He was ordained in 1963 and served at Borth, in north Cardiganshire, for ten years. In 1976 he gained a doctorate from the University of Wales for a research thesis on the Jewish background to St John's Gospel.

== Aberystwyth ==
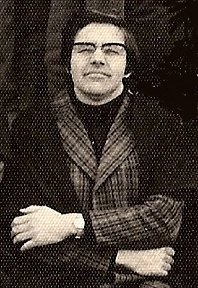
Williams in 1976

In 1966 Williams joined the teaching staff at the United Theological College, Aberystwyth, under its principal, the Revd Samuel Ifor Enoch, lecturing in Biblical studies. Williams took leading baritone roles in the University College's Gilbert and Sullivan Society, then under the conductor David Russell Hulme.

On his retirement in 2003 Williams had completed a period of 37 years as a lecturer within the Faculty of Theology of the University of Wales. He served as Principal of the United Theological College in Aberystwyth between 1998 and 2003.

== Achievements ==
Williams served two terms as Dean at the Aberystwyth and Lampeter School of Theology (1985–1987 and 1994–1997), and was visiting professor at Acadia Divinity College, Acadia University in Nova Scotia in 1997. He sat on the translating panel for the New Testament section of Y Beibl Cymraeg Newydd (The Revised New Welsh Bible) from 1975 onwards and was secretary of the Theological Branch of the University of Wales's Guild of Graduates for 36 years. He also served as chief A level examiner in Religious Studies for the WJEC for twelve years.

Currently, he is an honorary research fellow at the University of Wales, Lampeter's Department of Theology and Religious Studies and Research Fellow at the National Library of Wales. In 2002/03, he was Moderator of the Presbyterian Church of Wales's Association in the South and was the General Assembly's Moderator in 2006/07. In 1990 he was elected Moderator of the Free Church Federal Council in Wales and England: only the second of his denomination to fill the post in half a century.

In 2006, Williams received the honorary degree of Doctor of Divinity from the University of Wales in recognition of his contribution to biblical scholarship and to religion and education in Wales. In 2011 the volume The Bible in Church, Academy, and Culture: Essays in Honour of the Reverend Dr. John Tudno Williams edited by Alan P. F. Sell was published in honour of his contributions to the Church and to scholarship. In 2012 he was elected a Fellow of the Learned Society of Wales.

Williams married Ina Evans in 1964; the couple have two children, Haf and Tomos Tudno Williams.

Academic offices
Preceded by Elfed ap Nefydd Roberts	Principal of United Theological College, Aberystwyth; 1998–2003	Succeeded by None
