= David Williams (Methodist minister, born 1877) =

Welsh Calvinistic Methodist minister and theological tutor (1877–1927)

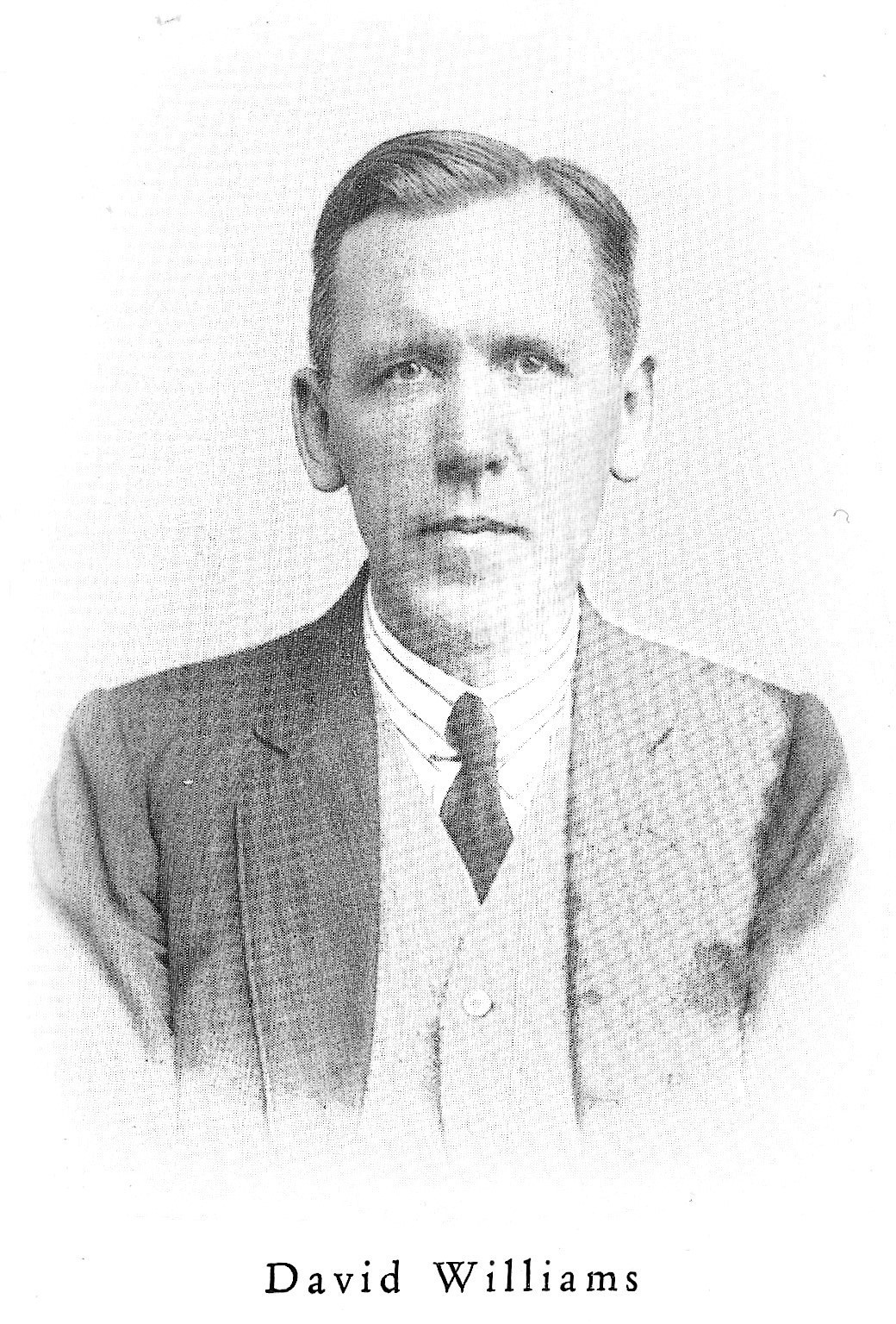
David Williams

David Williams (4 May 1877 – 12 July 1927) was a Welsh Calvinistic Methodist minister and theological tutor.

== Life ==
Williams was born on 4 May 1877 at Holyhead, Anglesey, north Wales. He was educated in Holyhead and in Beaumaris before moving to Oswestry where he was taught by Owen Owen. He obtained a degree in Greek and Latin from University College, Aberystwyth in 1898, then studied classics and theology at Jesus College, Oxford. He was appointed as the pastor of the Calvinistic Methodist church in Clifton Street, Cardiff in 1903 and was ordained in the following year. In 1905, he became professor of Church History at Trefeca theological college, and became professor of the New Testament in 1906 when the college moved to the United Theological College in Aberystwyth.

During the First World War, he was a chaplain with the Royal Welch Fusiliers from 1916 to 1918, seeing action in Egypt and Palestine. He had a high reputation as a chaplain, preacher (in both Welsh and in English) and teacher. He wrote commentaries on Galatians and 2 Corinthians, and helped prepare revised editions in Welsh of Galatians and James. He left Aberystwyth in 1922 to teach at the Bala College, refusing a promise of the Principalship in Aberystwyth. He died in London on 12 July 1927 after a long illness.
