= Rheinallt Nantlais Williams =

Welsh theologian (1911–1993)

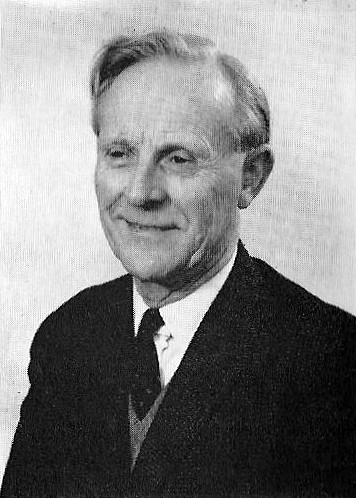
Rheinallt Nantlais Williams c1973

Rheinallt Nantlais Williams MBE (1911–1993) was a Welsh professor of the philosophy of religion and principal of the Presbyterian United Theological College, Aberystwyth in Wales from 1979 to 1980.

Rheinallt Williams was born in Ammanford in Carmarthenshire, one of seven children (two of whom died in infancy) of Nantlais Williams, a Welsh poet and a Presbyterian Christian leader during the 1904-1905 Welsh Revival and his wife Alice Maud Jones, a relative of J. T. Job. Williams gained a first-class honours degree in philosophy at Cardiff University, which was followed by research at the University of Edinburgh and the University of Marburg. He was elected Lewis Gibson Scholar at Westminster College, Cambridge, where he studied theology for three years. On leaving Cambridge he became the minister at the Tabernacle in Whitchurch in Cardiff from 1939 to 1949, excluding a period of war service.

During World War II he was appointed a Chaplain to the Forces (4th Class) in May 1942. In September 1943 Captain Williams was appointed MBE (Military Division) for services during the North African Campaign. He spent four years as Professor of Practical Theology at the Theological College in Bala before being appointed Professor of Philosophy of Religion at the United Theological College, Aberystwyth in 1953. In November 1960 he presented The Epilogue on the subject 'Like A River' on BBC television.

His 1973 book Faith Facing Facts was originally a Pantyfedwen Trust Lecture. It was followed a year later by Faith Facts History Science and How They Fit Together. In 1979 he succeeded S. I. Enoch as principal of the United Theological College in Aberystwyth.

With his wife he had two sons, one of whom is Stephen Nantlais Williams, Professor Emeritus of Systematic Theology at Union Theological College in Belfast.

== Selected publications ==
- The Victorious Cross Arti Grafiche Editoriali (1944)
- Faith Facing Facts Coverdale House Publishers Ltd., London (1973)
- Faith Facts History Science and How They Fit Together Tyndale House Publishers (1974) ISBN 0-8423-0839-3
- Y frwydr a'r oruchafiaeth

Academic offices
Preceded by Samuel Ifor Enoch	Principal of United Theological College, Aberystwyth; 1979–1980	Succeeded by Elfed ap Nefydd Roberts
