= Huw Owen =

Huw Parri Owen (30 December 1926 – 26 October 1996) was a Welsh theologian, writer and academic.

== Life ==
Owen was born on 30 December 1926 in Cardiff and was educated at Cardiff High School and Jesus College, Oxford, where he studied Literae Humaniores and Theology. He was ordained as a minister in the Presbyterian Church of Wales in 1949 in order to take up an appointment as Professor of New Testament at the United Theological College Aberystwyth (1949–53) before moving to Bangor as Lecturer in New Testament Studies at the University College of North Wales.

Though he was at first a biblical scholar, who published several articles on New Testament subjects in journals, Owen's interests rapidly turned to more philosophical themes. His first book, Revelation and Existence: A Study in the Theology of Rudolf Bultmann, was published in 1957 whilst at Bangor. Hywel Lewis, who had been a professor at Bangor, had moved to King's College London in 1955 and, through his influence, Owen was appointed as a lecturer in the philosophy of religion there in 1962; he became Reader in 1963. A concern for traditional theistic belief lasted throughout his life and writings, though he continued to review books in biblical studies as well as philosophy of religion, especially for the journal Religious Studies in the 1960s and 70s. He was appointed Professor of Christian Doctrine at King's College in 1971, a post he held until 1983. He was regarded as a distinguished theologian, who wrote and spoke with clarity. He died in Cardiff on 26 October 1996.

Though Owen's books published in his lifetime all treated of broad issues in theism such as the concept of God, knowledge of God, and arguments for his existence, a more specific study on the subject of prayer was published posthumously (see list of books below).

A short study of Owen's thought was published in 2012 by Alan P. F. Sell.

== Works ==
Owen's publications include:

- Revelation and Existence (1957)
- The Moral Argument for Christian Theism (1965)
- The Christian Knowledge of God (1969)
- Concepts of Deity (1971)
- W. R. Matthews: Philosopher and Theologian (1976)
- Christian Theism: A Study in its Basic Principles (1984)
- The Basis of Christian Prayer (edited by Stephen N. Williams) (2006)
