= William Richard Williams (theologian) =

Welsh theologian

William Richard Williams by Elliott & Fry (1943)

William Richard Williams (4 April 1896 – 18 December 1962) was the Principal of the United Theological College, Aberystwyth from 1949 to 1962, the first Secretary of the Council of Churches of Wales, and later its president.

== Biography ==
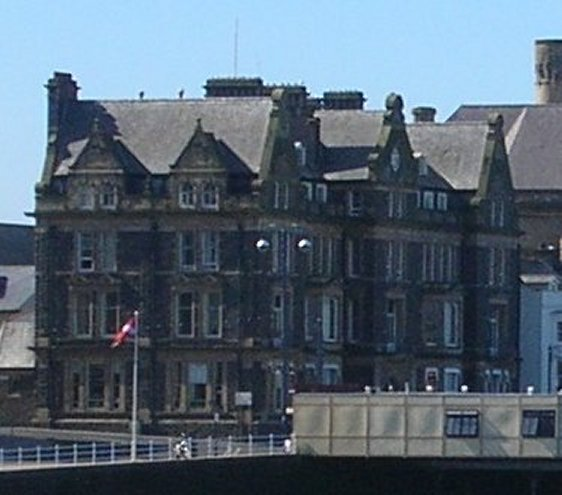
The United Theological College, Aberystwyth

Born at Pwllheli in Gwynedd to Richard and Catherine Williams, Williams moved to Aberystwyth with his mother on the death of his father in 1912 after winning a scholarship to University College, Aberystwyth, where he graduated in Greek and Philosophy. He served in the British Army during World War I, after which he studied at Lincoln College, Oxford, graduating with a first class BA degree in Theology. He was ordained in the Presbyterian Church of Wales in 1921, and served as a minister in Gowerton in Glamorganshire from 1921 to 1922 and at Argyle English Church in Swansea from 1922 to 1925.

Williams was an assistant lecturer at the United Theological College, Aberystwyth under Principal Owen Prys from 1925 to 1927, and Professor of Philosophy of religion from 1927 to 1928), and of Greek and New Testament exegesis from 1928 to 1949, when he was appointed Principal of the college, a position he held until his death in 1962. In 1928 he married Violet Irene Evans of Swansea, and they had a son, W. R. Williams.

He was the Moderator of the General Assembly in 1960, and Moderator of the South Wales Association in 1962. Williams was a promoter of ecumenism in Wales, and was the first Secretary of the Council of Churches of Wales, and its president at the time of his death in 1962. In 1961 he was elected chairman of the British committee of the Presbyterian Alliance. He was a member of the joint-committee which was appointed to prepare a new English translation of the Bible, and in 1961 he was appointed director of a committee which was set up to prepare a new Welsh translation of the Bible. He was also a contributor to The Dictionary of Welsh Biography Down to 1940.

== Publications ==
- Arweiniad i Efengyl Ioan, Dolgellau: E. W. Evans, 1930. viii, 102p. N.
- Cenadwri epistol y Philipiaid, DR, 1949 t. 75–9.
- Cynhadledd Edinburgh 1933, FFR Mawrth 1933 t. 163–7.
- Efengyl yn ol Marc, DR, 1941. t. 109–16.
- Yr Eglwys, Cymdeithas a'r Wladwraeth, EFR II, 3, 1937 t. 54–9.
- Epistol at yr Effesiaid a'i genadwri, DR, 1949 t. 129–32, 161–5, 216–9, 283–7.
- Yr Epistol at yr Hebreaid, gyda nodiadau eglurhaol, Caernarfon: Y Gymanfa Gyffredinol, 1932. 264 t. N. C.
- Epistol Cyntaf Ioan, Y Gymanfa Gyffredinol, 1943. 92t. N. C.
- Owen Prys. Yn Morris W. : Deg o Enwogion, Llyfrfa'r Methodistiaid Calfinaidd, 1959 t. 45–52. N. C.
- Y Parch. David Morris Jones, M. C., M. A., B. D., DI 8, 1957 p. 2-3
- Y Parch. E. Gwyn Evans: y dyn a'i nodweddion, DR, 1959 t. 6–10.
- Y Parch. G. Roberts Jones, DR, 1955 t. 49–51.
- Y Parch. R. J. Rees, M. A., DR, 1954 t. 73–5.
- Prifathro Howell Harris Hughes, DR, 1939 t. 209–12.

== Notes ==
Academic offices
Preceded by Gwilym Edwards	Principal of United Theological College, Aberystwyth; 1949–1962	Succeeded by Samuel Ifor Enoch
