= Gwilym Edwards =

Welsh Presbyterian minister and writer

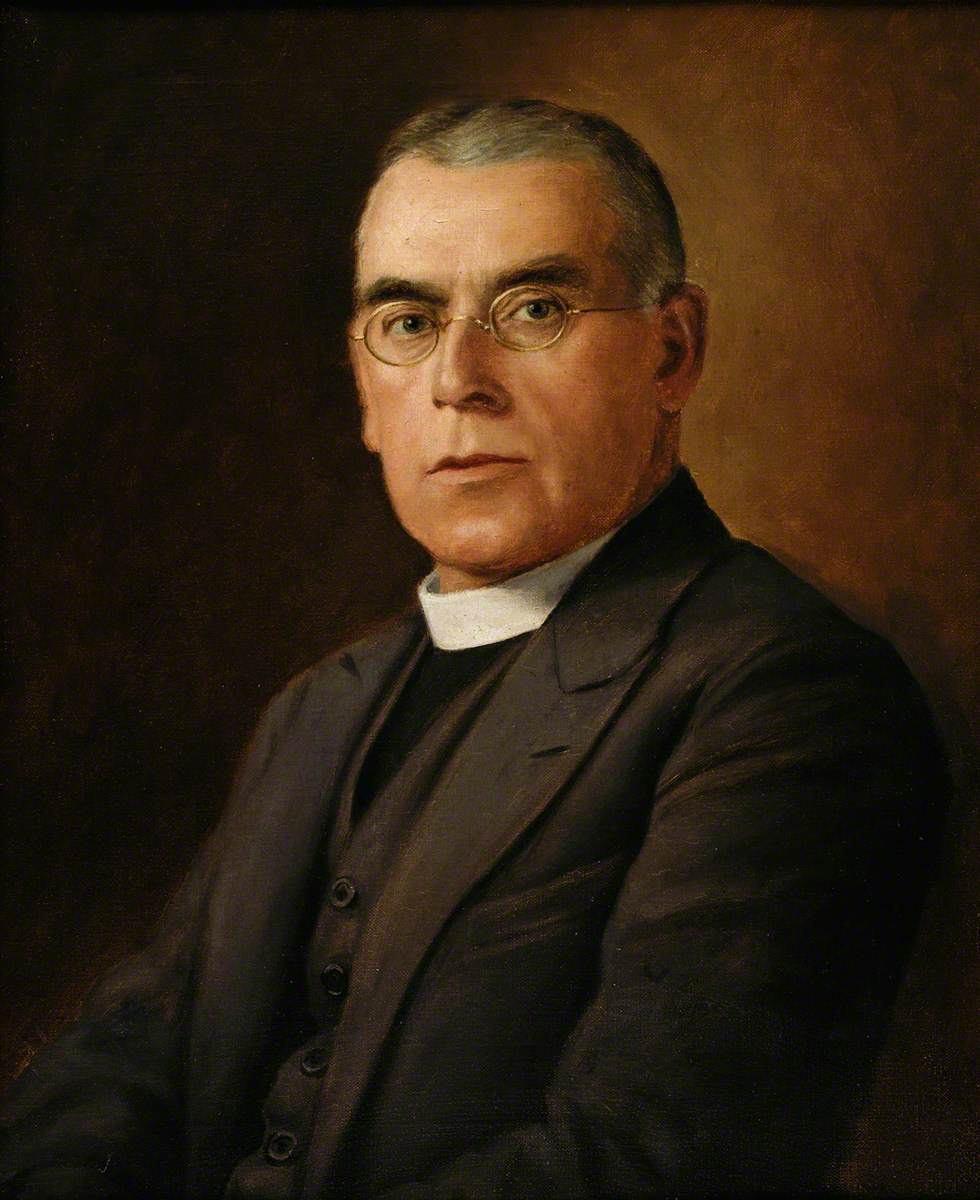
Gwilym Arthur Edwards

Gwilym Arthur Edwards (31 May 1881 – 5 October 1963) was a Welsh Presbyterian minister and writer on theological topics. He was Principal of the United Theological College Aberystwyth from 1939 to 1949.

== Life and career ==
Edwards was born in Caernarfon, Gwynedd in north Wales. His father, Owen Edwards, a Presbyterian minister, emigrated to Australia for health reasons, but his wife, Mary, died before she could join him with the children. Edwards was then brought up by his maternal grandparents in Dolgellau and was educated at the county school there before studying at the University College of Wales, Aberystwyth. He graduated with a BA degree in 1903 and later studied at Jesus College, Oxford (graduating from there in 1908).

Edwards had begun preaching at an early age and was ordained in 1909, serving firstly at Zion chapel in Carmarthen. Between 1911 and 1917, he was minister at a chapel in Oswestry; he also worked in chapels in Chester (1917 to 1923) and Bangor (1923 to 1928). Edwards was then appointed professor at Bala College in 1929, before becoming Principal of the Aberystwyth Theological College in 1939. After retiring in 1949 he moved back to Oswestry. In 1957 he was Moderator of the General Assembly of the Presbyterian Church of Wales. He died on 5 October 1963 and was buried in Llanycil, Gwynedd.

== Works ==
Edwards lectured and wrote extensively for the periodicals of the Welsh Presbyterian church. He wrote books in Welsh on the Bible and on Christian doctrine, a history of civilisation and a history of Bala College. He also wrote two volumes of stories for children in Welsh and a syllabus for religious instruction in Welsh schools. A pamphlet he wrote on Sunday School teachers and world peace was published by the United Nations in 1934. He was described as a "scholar with a clear, analytical mind" who paid "great attention to detail".

Academic offices
Preceded by Howel Harris Hughes	Principal of United Theological College, Aberystwyth; 1939–1949	Succeeded by William Richard Williams
