= Gwynn ap Gwilym =

Welsh poet, novelist, editor and translator

- Born: 1950; Bangor, Wales
- Died: 2016 (aged 65–66)
- Occupations: Novelist; poet

Academic background
- Education: University College, Galway (UCG); Wycliffe Hall, Oxford

Gwynn ap Gwilym (1950 – 31 July 2016) was a Welsh poet, novelist, editor and translator.

He was born in Bangor but raised in Machynlleth, in Powys, mid Wales, the son of a Presbyterian minister. He was educated at the University of Wales, Bangor, University College, Galway (UCG), and Wycliffe Hall, Oxford, gaining MA and MPhil degrees.

An Anglican clergyman, he was also a lecturer at the University of Wales, Aberystwyth. He was Parish rector of the Upper Dyfi Valley (churches Mallwyd, Cemmaes, Llanymawddwy, Darowen and Llanbrynmair). He lectured part-time at the former United Theological College Aberystwyth.

In 1983 he won the Welsh Arts Council prize for his volume of poetry, "Grassholm", and in 1986 he was the Chaired Bard at the National Eisteddfod in Fishguard for his ode, "The Cloud". His best-known publication was his metrical translation of the Psalms from the original Hebrew Salmau Cân Newydd (2008).

Gwilym died aged 66 on 31 July 2016 from cancer.

== Works ==
- Eisteddfota, C. Davis, 1979, ISBN 9780715405314
- Gwales, Gwasg Gwynedd, 1983, ISBN 978-0-00-017206-8
- Yr Ymyl Aur (1997)
- Dydd Oedd a Diwedd Iddo (2002)
- Cyfres o Esboniadau: Llyfr Deuteronomium (2002)

=== Editor ===
- Blodeugerdd o farddoniaeth Gymraeg yr ugeinfed ganrif, editors Gwynn ap Gwilym, Alan Llwyd, Gomer, 1987, ISBN 978-0-86383-349-6
