= Samuel Eyles Pierce =

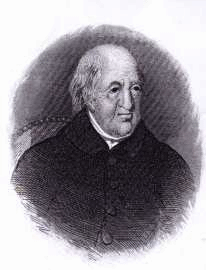
- Samuel Eyles Pierce
- Title: Reverend

Personal life
- Born: 23 June 1746 Upottery, Devonshire, England
- Died: 10 May 1829 (aged 82) Clapham, Surrey, England

Religious life
- Religion: Calvinist Baptist
- School: Coleg Trefeca, Wales

Senior posting
- Period in office: 18th-19th century

The Rev. Samuel Eyles Pierce (23 June 1746 in Upottery, Devonshire, England – 10 May 1829 in Clapham, Surrey, England) was an English preacher, theologian, and Calvinist divine. A Dissenter from the Honiton area, Pierce was an evangelical church minister aligned with Calvinist Baptist theology. He wrote more than fifty books and many sermons.

== Early years ==
Pierce was born on 23 June 1746 at the Vicarage House, at Upottery Rectory, near Honiton, Devon, the son of Adam Pierce (1717–1785), cabinet-maker, and Susannah (c.1710–1770), daughter of Joseph Chilcott, vicar of Upottery. A shy boy, he was brought up in a Christian household and was educated by his maternal grandfather, master of the grammar school in Honiton. He was apprenticed to a trade he was discontented with and soon developed a sense of doom over numerous natural disasters during this period such as the Lisbon earthquake, the Sherborne comet of 1768, local fires and a lightning strike on Moorfields Tabernacle which killed a worshipper.

== Career ==
He was inspired to become a preacher after reading Anthony Horneck's The Crucified Jesus, and soon began reading St Augustine, Philip Doddridge's The Rise and Progress of Religion in the Soul, sermons by James Hervey and George Whitfield. He gained experience in London February 1772 and August 1775, influenced by William Romaine. He was particularly opposed to the Methodist teachings of John Wesley and encountered hostility from the Methodists throughout his career. In 1775, he was admitted to Selina Hastings, Countess of Huntingdon's Coleg Trefeca, but again discontent, he was sent by Lady Huntingdon to serve the church in Gainsborough where he was ousted within a short period after the congregation accused him of antinomianism and soon transferred to Lincoln. He returned several times to Trefeca between 1776 and 1780 for Lady Huntington and gained some experience in Lincolnshire, Somerset, Sussex, Kent, and Cornwall.

After his itinerant ministry for the countess of Huntingdon was over, he became successful as an independent preacher in Truro in August 1783, responsible for a dramatic growth of the church from 36 to 90 people within a short period. There, Pierce met his future wife, Mary Randall (c.1729–1807/8), in the congregation and was married on 28 October 1784. However, although the early period at the church was a great success, he was later accused of antinomianism, including by his wife who withdrew her financial support of his ministry. As a result, he then worked as an itinerant preacher from 1796 across the West Country, travelling by invitation from church to church. He preached at Ebenezer Meeting in Truro, Cornwall, and several other locations. In his absence from preaching in London, his sermons were read out loud by his congregants as his regular listeners were said to be unable to 'endure any other preacher'. Eventually, he was led back to the London area where he became well known for his Calvinist beliefs. In 1805, a new chapel was erected for him at Printer's Court, Shoe Lane and accommodated by Thomas Bailey, Esq. of Stockwell, who later funded another church in Brixton where Pierce also preached on alternate Sunday evenings except on communion Sundays.

== Personal life ==
On 5 November 1819, at the age of 73, he married Elizabeth Turquand (b. 1783/4), the daughter of a Sugar-baker of Whitechapel. When remonstrated by deacons over the age difference, he replied, "If a ripe cherry fell into your mouth, wouldn't you eat it?"

He died at Acre Lane, Clapham, England on 10 May 1829.

== Partial works ==
- (1796) On the twenty-third psalm
- (1804) A treatise upon growth in grace
- (1805) A general account of the Book of psalms, with their use and place in the worship of God
- (1811) An essay towards an unfolding the glory of Christ, sermons. With Sermons of doctrinal, experimental and practical subjects
- (1822) An exposition of the fourteenth chapter of the prophet Hosea, the whole chapter sermonized
- (1827) Discourses designed as preparatory to the administration of the Lord's supper, with several sermons
