= F. C. Grant =

American New Testament scholar

The Reverend F. C. Grant
- Born: Frederick Clifton Grant; February 2, 1891; Beloit, Wisconsin, US
- Died: July 11, 1974 (aged 83)

Ecclesiastical career
- Religion: Christianity (Anglican)
- Church: Episcopal Church (United States)
- Ordained: 1912 (deacon); 1913 (priest)

Academic background
- Education: General Theological Seminary; Western Theological Seminary

Academic work
- Discipline: Biblical studies; theology
- Sub-discipline: Biblical theology; New Testament studies
- Institutions: Berkeley Divinity School; Seabury-Western Theological Seminary; Union Theological Seminary
- Influenced: Samuel Ifor Enoch

Frederick Clifton Grant (February 2, 1891 – July 11, 1974) was an American New Testament scholar. Grant was born on February 2, 1891, in Beloit, Wisconsin. He received a Bachelor of Divinity degree from General Theological Seminary in 1912 and Master of Sacred Theology and Doctor of Theology degrees from Western Theological Seminary in 1916 and 1922 respectively. As dean of Seabury-Western Theological Seminary, he was "intellectual leader" of a campaign to liberalize divorce canons in the Episcopal Church. Grant was Edward Robertson Professor of Biblical Theology at the Union Theological Seminary in New York City. In 1951, a Festschrift was published in his honor. The Joy of Study: Papers on New Testament and Related Subjects Presented to Honor Frederick Clifton Grant included contributions from Henry Cadbury, Philip Carrington, and Robert M. Grant.

Grant argued for a form of the multi-source hypothesis in relation to the synoptic problem. He argued in his 1957 work, The Gospels, Their Origin and Their Growth, that Matthew, Mark, and Luke all draw from the same collection of myths, legends, miracle tales, paradigms, and apothegms.

Grant's view that the author of the Gospel of John was "part of a group of early Christian gnostic-mystics" has since been discredited.

Grant died on July 11, 1974.

== Selected works ==
=== Books ===
- Grant, Frederick C. (1943). The Earliest Gospel: studies of the evangelic tradition at its point of crystalization in writing. Cole Lectures, 1943. New York & Nashville: Abingdon-Cokesbury Press. OCLC 269537.
- ——— (1950). An Introduction to New Testament Thought. New York: Abingdon-Cokesbury Press. OCLC 383096.
- ——— (1953). Hellenistic Religions: the age of syncretism. Library of religion. Vol. 2. New York: Liberal Arts Press. OCLC 180940.
- ——— (1957). The Gospels: their origin and their growth. New York: Harper. OCLC 383451.
- ——— (1957). Ancient Roman Religion. Library of Religion. Vol. 8. New York: Liberal Arts Press. OCLC 182157.
- ——— (1959). Ancient Judaism and the New Testament. New York: Macmillan. OCLC 1549381.
- ——— (1961). Translating the Bible. Greenwich, CT: Seabury Press. OCLC 535910.
- ——— (1962). Roman Hellenism and the New Testament. New York: Scribner. OCLC 832246.

== Festschrift ==
- Johnson, Sherman E., ed. (1951). The Joy of Study: papers on New Testament and related subjects presented to honor Frederick Clifton Grant. New York: Macmillan. OCLC 541019.
