= Howel Harris Hughes =

Welsh minister, theologian and college principal

Howel Harris Hughes (7 September 1873 – 23 November 1956) was a Welsh theologian and Presbyterian minister. He was Principal of the United Theological College in Aberystwyth in from 1927 to 1939.

== Biography ==
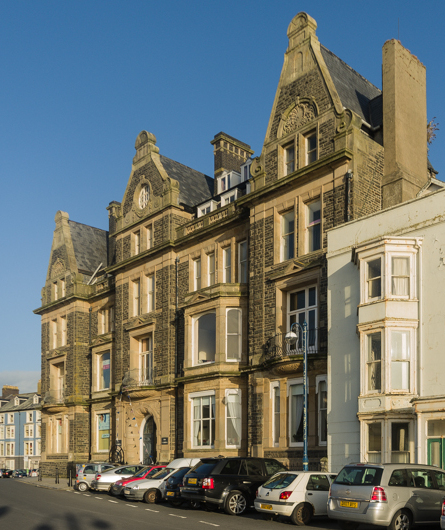
The United Theological College, Aberystwyth – Hughes was Principal here from 1927 to 1939

Hughes was born in Brynteg, Llanfair Mathafarn Eithaf in Anglesey in 1873, the son of Jane and the Rev. J. Richard Hughes, a Presbyterian minister. He was educated at Beaumaris Grammar School followed by the University College, Bangor where he gained a Bachelor of Arts degree and the Theological College, Bala from where he graduated in Theology – one of the first two students to receive a Bachelor of Divinity (BD) degree from the University of Wales. He was ordained a minister in the Presbyterian church in 1901 and served in Penmachno (1901 to 1903), Maenofferen in Blaenau Ffestiniog (1903 to 1907), Moriah in Caernarfon (1907 to 1909), and Princes Road in Liverpool (1909 to 1927). In 1902 he married Margaret Ellen, the daughter of Griffith Roberts (‘Gwrtheyrn’) of Bala and with whom he had three sons. He was Principal of the United Theological College in Aberystwyth from 1927 to 1939, succeeding Owen Prys. After retiring he moved near to Liverpool where he ministered at the Welsh church at Southport from 1939 to 1950.

A powerful and highly regarded preacher, he was an influential minister in Presbyterianism in Wales, being appointed Moderator of the Association in the North in 1943 and of the General Assembly during World War II from 1939 to 1941. He was Secretary of the committee on Christian Doctrine set up by the Presbyterian Church Commission for Re-construction after World War I and was one of four ministers who formulated the Shorter Declaration of Faith and Practice for the Presbyterian Church of Wales. His commentary on the Book of Amos published in 1924 was considered to be one of the best of the series published by his Connexion. He was highly regarded by his students and his congregations as "a saint and prophet".

Increasingly frail in his latter years he died in Liverpool on 23 November 1956.

Academic offices
Preceded by Owen Prys	Principal of United Theological College, Aberystwyth; 1927–1939	Succeeded by Gwilym Edwards
