= United Theological College, Aberystwyth =

Former institution in Aberystwyth, Ceredigion, Wales

United Theological College
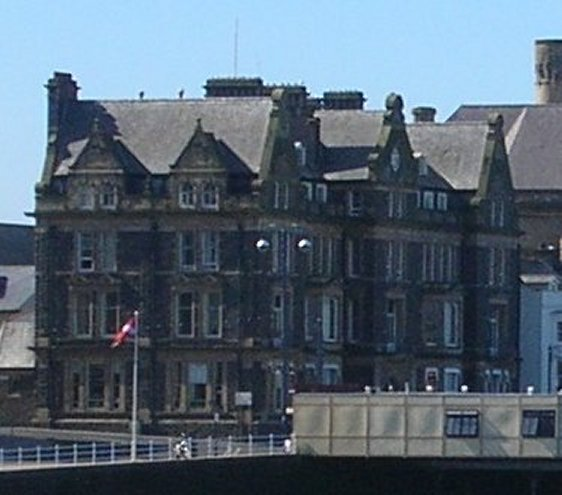
- The United Theological College, Aberystwyth

General information
- Location: Aberystwyth, United Kingdom
- Coordinates: 52.4153°N 4.0874°W
- Completed: 1896

Design and construction
- Architect: George Croydon Marks
- Designations

Listed Building – Grade II
- Official name: The United Theological College
- Designated: 24 November 1987
- Reference no.: 10308

Map of the Aberystwyth Seafront buildings

The United Theological College (Welsh: Y Coleg Diwinyddol Unedig) located in Aberystwyth, in the county of Ceredigion in mid Wales, is a Grade II listed building which was the ministerial training college of the Presbyterian Church of Wales from 1906 to 2003 and an associate college of the University of Wales.

== History ==
According to the Cardiganshire County History, 'Theol Coll' (as it was affectionately known in the town) opened in Aberystwyth in 1906 on the seafront site of the former Customs House. This in turn was demolished and the stone-built Cambrian Hotel was built on the site in 1896 to the design of George Croydon Marks, engineer to the Aberystwyth Improvement Company.

The hotel failed to prosper and the building was purchased by David Davies MP in 1906 and was presented to the Calvinistic Methodist Connexion as a residential theological college, at a total cost of about £30,000. The professors and students of Trevecka College in Breconshire were transferred to the new college in 1906. In 1910 there were about 30 students. Later, because of the falling number of students training for the ministry, the college opened its doors to students wanting to take a theology degree as an academic subject alone. Degrees offered included Bachelor of Divinity (BD) and Master of Theology (MTh).

Former principals of the college include the Reverend Owen Prys (1906–1927), the Revd Samuel Ifor Enoch (1963–1979), the Revd Rheinallt Nantlais Williams (1979–1980) and the Revd John Tudno Williams (1998–2003). Other lecturers at the college included Emrys G. Bowen and Sir Glanmor Williams, the latter an occasional visiting lecturer. Bruce M. Metzger, the American biblical scholar and textual critic of Princeton Theological Seminary gave a lecture at the college in 1981.

The United Theological College in Aberystwyth closed in 2003, when the Presbyterian Church of Wales relocated its ministerial training to Bangor. The college's extensive library, which contained many rare and old theological books, is now mainly held at the University Library in Lampeter and the National Library of Wales.

== Redevelopment ==
In 2018 Aberystwyth University announced plans for a major redevelopment of the seafront buildings, known as 'Old College'. In partnership with National Museum Wales, Hay Festival, National Library of Wales and Ceredigion Museum, the buildings are to be refitted, to provide a range of educational and cultural facilities along with hotel accommodation. Additional government funding enabled the adjoining 'Cambria Building', formerly the Theological College, to be included as a second phase of the project. Restoration work commenced in 2023, with the hope that phase 1 will be completed by late 2025 with the phase 2 Cambria Building works finishing a year later.

== Notable staff and alumni ==
=== Principals ===
Owen Prys, first Principal, in 1922

- Owen Prys (1857–1934), Principal 1906–27, Moderator of the Presbyterian Church in Wales in 1910.
- Howel Harris Hughes (1873–1956), Principal 1927–39, Moderator of the Presbyterian Church of Wales during World War II, 1939–41.
- Rev Gwilym Edwards, Principal 1939–49, and Moderator of the General Assembly of the Presbyterian Church of Wales.
- Rev William Richard Williams, Principal 1949–62, and President of the Council of Churches of Wales, and Chairman of the British Committee of the Presbyterian Alliance.
- Rev Samuel Ifor Enoch, Principal 1963–1978.
- Rev Rheinallt Nantlais Williams, Principal 1978–1980.
- Rev Elfed ap Nefydd Roberts, MA, DD, Principal 1980–1997.
- Rev John Tudno Williams, Principal 1998–2003, and Moderator of the General Assembly of the Presbyterian Church of Wales 2006-7.

=== Lecturers ===
- E. G. Bowen lectured on Church History.
- William David Davies, Presbyterian minister and writer on theological topics.
- Gwynn ap Gwilym, Chaired Bard, and author of several works on Welsh literature and a commentary on Deuteronomy.
- Huw Owen, Welsh theologian, writer and academic, Professor of New Testament 1949–53.
- Alan P. F. Sell, Professor of Christian Doctrine and Philosophy of Religion.
- Rev David Williams, Welsh Calvinistic Methodist minister and theological tutor.
- Sir Glanmor Williams was an occasional lecturer on Church History.
- Stephen Nantlais Williams, Professor of Theology 1980–91.

=== Alumni ===
- Glenn Christodoulou, Chairman of the Crimean War Research Society from 1983–95.
- Rev J. E. Wynne Davies, graduated BD in 1963. Lectured periodically in Church History and Pastoral Studies at the Theological College and was editor of the Historical Journal of the Presbyterian Church of Wales from 1977 to 2000. He has been the Chairman of the History Committee since 1988 and was curator of the Calvinistic Methodist Archives deposited at the National Library of Wales between 1983 and 2007. He was Moderator of the Presbyterian Church of Wales, 2000–2001.
- James Daniel Evans (1870–1936), Moderator of the Presbyterian Church of Wales, 1935-6.
- John Harris Hughes, Moderator of the Presbyterian Church of Wales in 1975
- David Evan Jones, missionary in India..
- J. E. Caerwyn Williams, formerly Professor of Irish at the University College of Wales, Aberystwyth, and the first Director of the University of Wales Centre for Advanced Welsh and Celtic Studies.
- Fiona Cuthbertson (nee Bryce), who attended between 1995 - 1998, achieved a Bachelor of Divinity Degree and was also a member of the NUS Wales National Executive. She later became a local councillor in Merton and a Parliamentary candidate in Preston in 2005.. In 2010 she established Keystone Consulting (www.keystone-consulting.co.uk), a public affairs agency that specialises in tax, retail crime, infrastructure and transport. Key successes include business rates relief for retailers and ensuring that attacks on shop workers were made an aggravated offence.
