= E. G. Bowen =

Welsh geographer

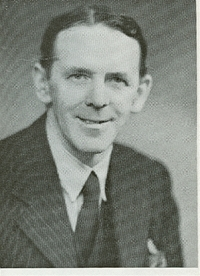
E. G. Bowen

Emrys George Bowen FRGS, FSA, also known as E. G. Bowen (28 December 1900 – 8 November 1983), was an internationally renowned geographer with a particular interest in the physical geography and social geography of his native Wales. A diminutive figure, Bowen was on the academic staff of the Department of Geography and Anthropology at the University College of Wales, Aberystwyth, from the 1920s and continued to write and lecture there until his death in 1983.

== Biography ==
E. G. Bowen was born at Spilman Street in Carmarthen, Wales, the elder child of Thomas Bowen, an insurance agent, and Elizabeth Ann Lynch. He was educated at the council school, Pentre-poeth, and from 1912 to 1919 at Queen Elizabeth Grammar School, Carmarthen. Bowen spent a year as an assistant teacher in the Model and Practising School in Carmarthen Bowen before proceeding in 1919 to the University College of Wales, Aberystwyth, where he obtained a first-class honours degree in Geography in 1923.

Bowen became the first Cecil Prosser research fellow at the Welsh National School of Medicine at Cardiff, where he investigated the relationship between 'racial type' and chest disease. From 1928 to 1929, he was an assistant editor with the Encyclopædia Britannica before being appointed in 1929 as an assistant lecturer in the Department of Geography and Anthropology at Aberystwyth. He remained there for the rest of his academic career, including during World War II, when he continued to lecture and also taught meteorology to the Royal Air Force initial training wing, which was located there. He was Gregynog Professor of Geography and Anthropology from 1946 to his retirement in 1968.

Bowen was President of the Institute of British Geographers in 1958 and President of Section E of the British Association in 1962. He was awarded the Murchison Grant by the Royal Geographical Society in 1958. In 1949 he was elected a Fellow of the Society of Antiquaries and, in 1967, he was President of the Cambrian Archaeological Association in 1967–68. He was President of the Aberystwyth Old Students' Association in 1971–72. He was awarded an honorary LL.D. by the University of Wales and, in June 1979, was awarded an honorary D.Univ. by the Open University. He was an honorary member of the Gorsedd of Bards.

Bowen continued with his academic work and writing after his retirement, continuing to lecture at the University College of Wales, Aberystwyth, the United Theological College, Aberystwyth, and at various other universities and colleges on Geography and Church history.

Bowen's work on the Settlements of the Celtic Saints in Wales (1954) revolutionized studies in this field. His studies of regional landscape and industry took into account the Welsh language as a factor in the "human geography" of Wales.

He lived for many years with his sister, Elizabeth 'Betty' Bowen. After his retirement in 1968 Bowen continued to live at Aberystwyth, where he died unmarried after a heart attack on 8 November 1983 at Bronglais General Hospital, Aberystwyth. He was buried at Carmarthen.

The 'E. G. Bowen Map Room' at Aberystwyth University is named in his memory. His papers are held in the archive of the National Library of Wales.

== Publications and articles ==
- Antiquities and History. In Cambrian forests 1959. p. 34–40
- Bedyddwyr Cymru tua 1714 TCHB, 1957 t. 6–14
- Cardiganshire in Pre-historic times TCAS 11, 1936 p. 12–20
- Carmarthen Town Plan: A Geographical Interpretation TCMS 59, 1934 p. 1–7
- Carmarthenshire and Wanderings of the Celtic Saints TCMS 62, 1936 p. 42-5
- Carmarthenshire: Physiographical Background. In J.Lloyd:History of Carmarthenshire, Vol.1, 1935. Sect.1.
- Celtic Saints CYG 2, 1946 p. 130-3
- Celtic Saints in Cardiganshire CER 1, 1, 1951 t. 3–17
- Churches of Mount and Verwig CER 2, 1952–5 p. 202-5
- Clawdd Mawr BBCS 9, 1937
- Clinical Study of Miners' Phthisis in Relation to the Geographical and Racial Features of the Cardiganshire Lead-Mining Area. In 'Studies in Regional Consciousness and Environment' Oxford, 1930 p. 189–202
- Cult of Dewi Sant at Llanddewi Brefi CER 2, 1953 p. 61-5
- Cyfrifoldeb yr Eglwys i Noddi ei Bywyd ei Hunan SG, 1955 t. 133-40
- Daearyddiaeth Cymru fel cefndir i'w hanes. Darlith radio y BBC yng Nghymru BBC., 1964. 40 t.
- Dechrau trefi yng Nghymru FD 2, 1932 t. 260, 266, 285–6
- Dyfed-the land and its people. in 'Land of Dyfed in Early Times' Cardiff:Cambrian Archaeological Association, 1964
- Economic and Social Life. History of Carmarthenshire Vol 2. 1939. Ed. By E. G. Bowen
- Early Christianity in British Isles Geog. 17, 1932
- Ein hen drefi hynod FG, 1932 t. 285-6
- Exiles LW 20, No. 1, 1965 p. 5–7
- Folk culture and local museums CAR 1, 1941–4 Pt. 2, p. 4–8
- For Herbert John Fleure (on his eightieth birthday, 6 June 1957) GE 42, 1957 p. 137-40
- From Antiquarianism to Archaeology in Cardiganshire 1909–1957 CER 3, 1959 p. 257-64
- Geographers' Approach to Agriculture AAG 2, 1953 p. 10–14
- Geography in Sixth Form Bulletin Collegiate Faculty of Education, Aberystwyth. 1958 p. 2–3
- Gwlad a Thref EFR 9, Rhif 2, 1944 t. 27–30
- Human Geography of West Wales. N.U.T. Souvineir 1933 p. 10–22
- Importance of St David's in Early Times St David's Cathedral Report. 1955 p. 6–13
- Incidence of phthisis in relation to race-type and social environment in Central Wales JRAI January–June 1933 p. 49–61
- Incidence of Phthisis in relation to racial types and social environment in Wales Br. Jnl of TB, July 1929
- Industries of Wales. Chapter in 'Land of Welsh Dragon' University of Wales Press Board, 1953
- Introductory survey of economic and social conditions in Carmarthenshire in industrial periods. In 'Hist. Carmarthenshire' 1939, Vol. 2., Chapter 4
- Le Pays de Galles TIBG 26, 1959 p. 1–23
- Map of Trehelig common fields MC 41, 1929–30 p. 163-8
- Men's Hostel CBS p. 202-4
- Merioneth in the Dark Ages JMHS 2, 1955 p. 169-78
- Monastic Economy of the Cistercians at Strata Florida CER 1, 1950–1 p. 34-7
- Nature Study and Geography in West Wales NLW 1, No. 1, 1955 p. 17–21
- Passage to Patagonia LW 20, No. 2, 1965 p. 4–6
- People and Culture of Rural Wales BG 1925–27 p. 77-8
- Prehistoric South Britain. In 'Historical Geography of England before 1800.' Chapter 1 C.U.P., 1936
- Professor H. J. Fleure on his 80th birthday: an appreciation of his contributions to Geography Geog. 42, 1957
- Racial Geography of Europe at the Dawn of Age of Metal JRAI 61, 1931
- Rural Settlements in South West Wales Geog. Teacher 13, 1925 p. 317
- Rural Settlements of Central Wales. In 'Comptes Rendus du Congres International de Geographie Tome 3' 1934 p. 205-13
- Rural Wales. Chapter 14 of 'Great Britain:Geographical Essays' (ed. J. Mitchell) Cambridge University Press, 1962 p. 247-64
- Settlements of the Celtic Saints in Wales. University of Wales Press, 1954. X, 179 P. 2nd ed. Same imprint and collation. 1956
- Settlement Pattern of Wales. In 'Field Studies in British Isles' (Steers) 20th International Congress, 1964 p. 279-93
- Sir C. Bryner Jones CER 2, 1952–5. p. 125-6
- Social Studies in Welsh Schools WA 1, 1949 p. 11–18
- Some geographical and anthropological factors in study of industrial diseases JSM 38, 1930 p. 11
- South West Wales Br. Grassl. Soc. Handbook, 1963 p. 10–16
- Travels and Settlements of the Celtic Saints WL 24, 1946 p. 100-3
- Travels of Celtic Saints ANT, 1944 p. 16–28
- Travels of St. Samson of Dol AS 13, 1934 P. 61-7
- Trefi Newydd Cymru FG 2, 1932 t. 19
- Un byd AE 1953 t. 102–4; CR 18, 1953–4 t. 48–51
- Wales: a Physical, Historical and Regional Geography Methuen, 1957. 528 p. ed. by E. G. Bowen
- Wales: A study in geography and history University of Wales Press Board, 1941. xvi, 182 p. 2nd ed. 1947; 5th imp. 1952
- Weather and Farmer BRF 7, No. 5, 1954
- Welsh Emigration Overseas AV 67, 1960 p. 260-71
- Welsh Family Farm JUA 39, 1958 p. 5–8

Publications in collaboration

- Denmark and Wales Geog., 1930 (with H. J. Fleure)
- Carmarthenshire in New Stone Age etc. In Lloyd, J.: History of Carmarthenshire. Vol. 1. 1935 (with Cyril Fox)

Professional and academic associations
Preceded by T. Evans	President of the Aberystwyth Old Students' Association; 1971–72	Succeeded by Mati Rees
