= Samuel Ifor Enoch =

Welsh Presbyterian minister and biblical scholar (1914–2001)

The Reverend Samuel Ifor Enoch
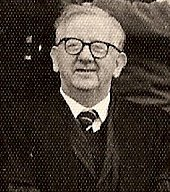
- Born: 26 December 1914; Ciliau Aeron, Wales
- Died: 10 June 2001 (aged 86); Aberystwyth, Wales
- Political party: Labour Party
- Spouse: Margaret Mary (Peggy) O'Connor (m. 1953; died 2000)

Ecclesiastical career
- Religion: Christianity (Presbyterian)
- Church: Presbyterian Church of Wales
- Ordained: 1941

Academic background
- Education: University of Wales; Columbia University
- Influences: F. C. Grant; Reinhold Niebuhr

Academic work
- Discipline: Biblical studies; theology
- School or tradition: Christian socialism; Social Gospel
- Institutions: United Theological College, Aberystwyth

Samuel Ifor Enoch (26 December 1914 – 10 June 2001) was Professor of New Testament Studies and Principal of the Presbyterian United Theological College, Aberystwyth in Wales.

== Early life ==
Samuel Ifor Enoch was born on 26 December 1914 at Ciliau Aeron, Cardiganshire, one of three sons of Jennie Enoch and J. Aeronydd Enoch. As a school boy in Ferryside in south Carmarthenshire Enoch grew up with serious breathing problems and he lost much of his grammar-school years due to recurring pneumonia. Enoch had pneumonia four times, once even surviving double pneumonia. Despite all this ill-health he continued to read and study and gained access to the University of Wales at Swansea where he studied Greek and, having won a Lewis and Gibson Scholarship, later read Theology at Westminster College, Cambridge.

In 1933, Enoch contributed one shilling (5p) towards the public fund-raising campaign which bought the Codex Sinaiticus from the Russian government for £100,000. It is now in the British Library in London.

== Student days ==
Enoch joined Columbia University, in New York City, where he researched for a Master of Philosophy degree. Here he came under the influence of the brilliant scholars at Union Theological Seminary, especially the Professor of Applied Christianity, Reinhold Niebuhr and F. C. Grant.

Enoch was ordained into the Presbyterian Church of Wales in 1941, and served for 10 years as minister in Aberdare, Glamorgan, where he became an exponent of the Social Gospel. He was proud of his left-wing credentials as a Christian socialist and gave his support to the Labour Party. He was delighted when in 1964 Harold Wilson was elected Prime Minister.

== Aberystwyth ==
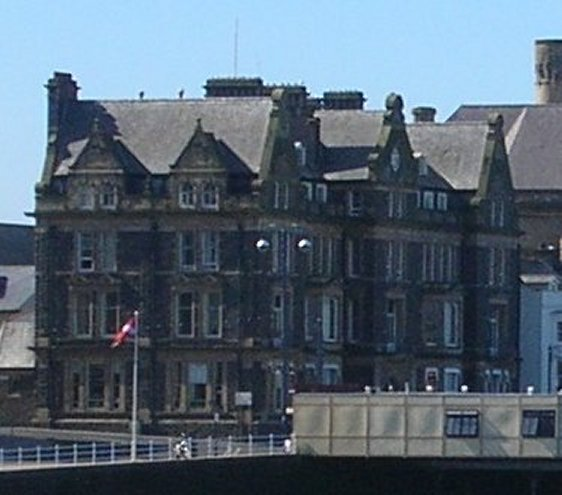
The United Theological College, Aberystwyth

From Aberdare Enoch went to Aberystwyth, where he stayed for nearly 50 years, as Professor of Greek and New Testament Studies (1953–62), and then as a very successful and popular Principal of the United Theological College from 1963 (after the death of W. R. Williams), until his retirement in 1978, when he was succeeded by Rheinallt Nantlais Williams.

He was an accomplished lecturer, preacher and linguist; he mastered five languages, Hebrew, Greek, English, Welsh, and German. He was deeply interested in the archaeological findings of the Nag Hammadi Gnostic Gospels in 1945 and the Dead Sea Scrolls in 1947.

== Achievements ==
Enoch was involved in the interpretation of the Dead Sea Scrolls, and his 1968 monograph The Jesus of Faith and the Dead Sea Scrolls is a notable work. His 1979 D.J. James lectures, delivered at the University College of Swansea, were published as Jesus in the Twentieth Century.

In 1966, Enoch was invited to revise the commentary on the Second Epistle to the Corinthians prepared by his predecessor David Williams. He was a prominent member of the Studiorum Novi Testamenti Societas and a member of the University of Wales Subject Panel (1971–1974). Enoch was a member of the New Testament and Apocrypha Panel of the New Welsh Bible from its origin in 1964 and remained on it until the publication of the full translation in 1988. In addition, he served as Dean of the Faculty of Theology of the University of Wales from 1971 to 1974, and played a prominent role in the university's committees, and especially in the administration of the University College, Aberystwyth.

In his retirement he continued to lecture for the University of Wales in extramural adult classes and was an active preacher in chapels across Wales.

Enoch married Margaret Mary (Peggy) O'Connor from Ireland in 1953; she died in 2000. They adopted two children: Desmond John Enoch (who served with the Royal Marines during the Falklands War), and a daughter, Helen Margaret Enoch, a nurse.

Samuel Ifor Enoch died at Aberystwyth on 10 June 2001 and was cremated at the local crematorium.

Academic offices
Preceded by William Richard Williams	Principal of United Theological College, Aberystwyth; 1963–1978	Succeeded by Rheinallt Nantlais Williams
