= Walter Kotschnig =

Walter Maria Kotschnig ( April 9, 1901, Judenburg, Austria – June 23, 1985, Newtown, Pennsylvania) was an American diplomat who served in international organizations, including a long tenure in the United Nations, as well as worked in the administrations of five American presidents.

== Early life ==
He was born in Judenburg, Austria-Hungary in 1901. His father, Ignaz Kotschnig, was from Mahrenberg, which would later become part of Slovenia. Kotschnig studied at the University of Graz from 1919 to 1922. He completed a PhD in Political Science at the Institut für Weltwirtschaft (Institute for the World Economy), University of Kiel in 1924. He wrote a PhD thesis, entitled ‘Univeral Oekonomie und Weltwirtschaft’ (Universal Economics and the World Economy).

== Career ==
In much of the 1920s and 1930s, he worked for international organizations in Geneva, Switzerland. He worked for the International Student Service from 1925. He began working for the League of Nations High Commissioner for Refugees in 1934. He moved to the United States in 1936. He lost his Austrian citizenship in 1938 following the Anschluss. He became an American citizen in 1942.

He worked for the U.S. State Department, helping to establish what would become the United Nations. He took part in the Dumbarton Oaks Conference in Washington in 1944 and the San Francisco Conference in 1945.

He retired as Deputy Assistant Secretary of State in 1971.

== Personal life ==
He married a Welsh woman, Elined Prys, in 1921. They had three children.
