= Stephen N. Williams =

Welsh theologian and lecturer (born 1952)

Stephen Nantlais Williams (born 1952) is a Welsh Presbyterian theologian, author and lecturer who, after retiring from a teaching career was appointed Honorary Professor of Theology at Queen's University Belfast in 2017.

The son of Rheinallt Nantlais Williams and the grandson of Nantlais Williams, Stephen Williams gained his Master of Arts degree in Modern History at the University of Oxford and his Master of Arts degree in theology from the University of Cambridge. After a period as Henry Fellow in Yale University, he received his PhD through the Department of Religious Studies of the university in 1981. Except for a short time at Oxford at the Whitefield Institute for Theological Research (1991–1994) he has mostly spent his professional life in Presbyterian seminaries in the United Kingdom, firstly as Professor of Theology in the United Theological College, Aberystwyth (1980–1991) and then as Professor of Systematic Theology in Union Theological College in Belfast (1994–2017). He was appointed Honorary Professor of Theology at Queen's University Belfast in 2017 and elected Fellow of the Learned Society of Wales (FLSW) in 2018.

Although his main professional areas are theology and intellectual history, Williams also has an interest in the field of bioethics, served on the editorial board of Ethics & Medicine and spoke at the inaugural The Center for Bioethics & Human Dignity conference in the US in 1994. During 2018 Williams held a Research Fellowship at the Henry Center at Trinity Evangelical Divinity School "researching the connection between a Christian understanding of creation and philosophies undergirding developments in artificial intelligence."

His books include: Revelation and Reconciliation: A Window on Modernity (Cambridge University Press, 1995); The Shadow of the Antichrist: Nietzsche's Critique of Christianity (Baker Academic Press, 2006) and The Election of Grace: A Riddle Without a Resolution? (Eerdmans, 2015).
