= John Thomas Job =

Welsh minister, hymn-writer and poet (1867–1938)

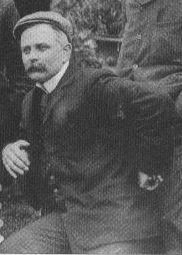
J. T. Job in 1904

John Thomas Job (21 May 1867 – 4 November 1938), was a Welsh minister, hymn-writer and poet.

He was born at Llandybie in Carmarthenshire, and educated locally. He went on to Trefeca College to train as a Methodist minister. In 1894, he married Etta Davies, and they had three children. He won the bardic chair at the National Eisteddfod of Wales on three occasions: in 1897, 1903, and 1918, and in 1900 he won the crown. He also won the chair at the San Francisco Eisteddfod of 1915. In the same year, he married for the second time, to Catherine Shaw; they had two children.

== Works ==
- Caniadau Job
