= Owen Prys =

Welsh Calvinistic Methodist minister (1857–1934)

Owen Prys, first Principal of the United Theological College in Aberystwyth in Wales in 1922

Owen Prys (25 September 1857 – 12 December 1934) was a Calvinistic Methodist minister and first Principal of the United Theological College in Aberystwyth in Wales (1906–27) and Moderator of the Presbyterian Church of Wales in 1910. The Welsh scholar Sir Ifor Williams described him as one of the most powerful preachers of the 20th century.

== Biography ==
Born in 1857 the son of Absalom and Ann Prys of the Factory, Pen-llwyn, near Aberystwyth, he studied at the National School in Pen-llwyn under his uncle after which he was for a period a pupil-teacher at the local British School. In 1876 he attended the Normal College in Bangor following which he was headmaster of the Board School at Goginan until 1893. At Bangor he had studied music and mathematics, but after leaving college he was influenced by Thomas Carlyle and William Ellery Channing and developed an interest in Theology. In 1883 he went to Peterhouse, Cambridge, but on winning a £100 scholarship he transferred to Trinity College, Cambridge from where he graduated in 1886 with first class honours in the Moral Sciences Tripos. He remained for a further year at Cambridge and in 1887 was appointed lecturer at Owen's College in Manchester as assistant to Robert Adamson. He then spent a year in Germany, spending most of his time there at the University of Leipzig.

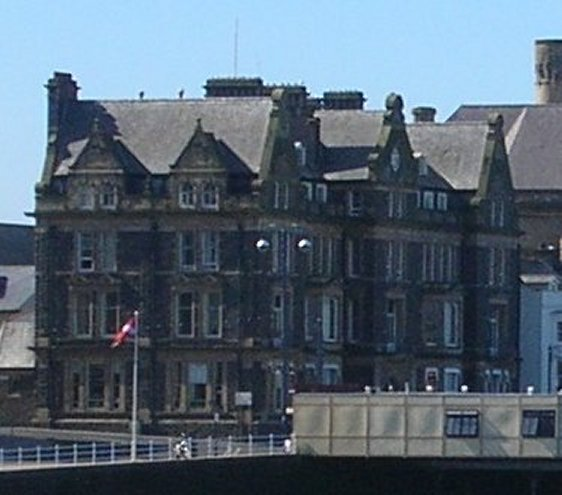
The United Theological College, Aberystwyth - Prys was Principal here from 1906 to 1927

Prys began to preach in 1883 and quickly came to notice for the enthusiasm, depth and intelligence of his sermons. In 1890 he was appointed a tutor at Trevecka College and in 1891 was ordained and appointed Principal; the college moved to Aberystwyth in 1906 as the United Theological College and amalgamated with Bala College in 1922 with Prys remaining as Principal through all these changes until his retirement in 1927 when he was succeeded by Howel Harris Hughes. He taught Divinity, Philosophy of Religion and Christian Ethics with a devout fervour. He married Elizabeth Parry, the eldest daughter of John Parry of Tal-y-bryn, Bwlch, Brecknock in 1893 and with her had two daughters. In 1904 he delivered the ‘Davies Lecture’ at Cardiff on ‘The Doctrine of Man.’ He was elected Moderator of the General Assembly in 1910 and of the South Wales Association in 1917. In 1922 he was given the honorary degree of Doctor of Divinity by the University of Wales. He was again elected Moderator of the General Assembly of the Presbyterian Church of Wales for the 1935 bi-centenary celebrations of the denomination but died in December 1934 before he could take up that office.

His papers are held by the National Library of Wales.

Academic offices
Preceded by None	Principal of United Theological College, Aberystwyth; 1906-1927	Succeeded by Howel Harris Hughes
