= Alan P. F. Sell =

Alan P. F. Sell

Alan Philip Frederick Sell FSA, FRhistS (15 November 1935 – 7 February 2016) was a minister of the United Reformed Church and was formerly Professor of Christian Doctrine and Philosophy of Religion at the United Theological College, Aberystwyth in Wales. An author in the fields of philosophy, theology, ethics and history he held prominent positions in various ecumenical organizations including the World Alliance of Reformed Churches.

== Early life ==
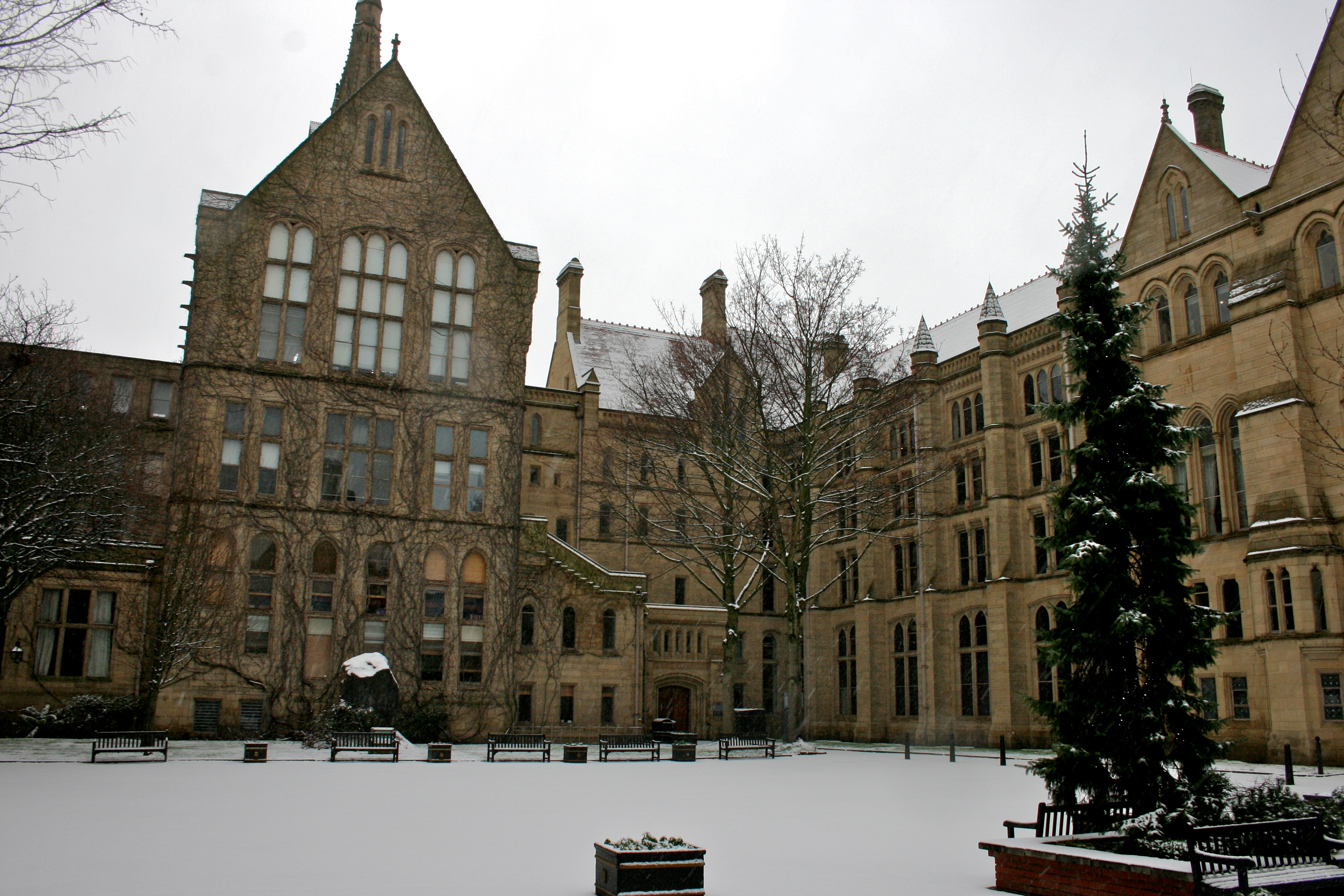
Sell was a student at the University of Manchester (1953-1961)

Alan Sell was born in 1935 at Farncombe in Surrey, the son of Arthur Philip and Freda Marion (née Bushen) Sell. He was educated at Pewley Grammar School in Guildford before undertaking ministerial training at Lancashire Independent College (later the Northern Congregational College) in Manchester. He took his Bachelor of Arts degree at the University of Manchester in 1957; his Bachelor of Divinity degree at the same university in 1959 and took his Master of Arts degree there in 1961. He began his ministry with the United Reformed Church in 1959, commencing his pastorate in Westmorland and Worcestershire; he was the minister in various Congregational Churches in England from 1959 to 1968 before being appointed a lecturer at the West Midlands College of Higher Education (1968-1983). In 1981 he was the recipient of the Gunning Prize from the Victoria Institute.

His book The Great Debate: Calvinism, Arminianism and Salvation (Baker, 1983) was the first to use the expressions "Arminianism of the head" and "Arminianism of the heart" which became better known through Roger E. Olson's Arminian Theology: Myths and Realities (IVP, 2006). Sell was a visiting professor at the University of Chester.

== Academic career ==
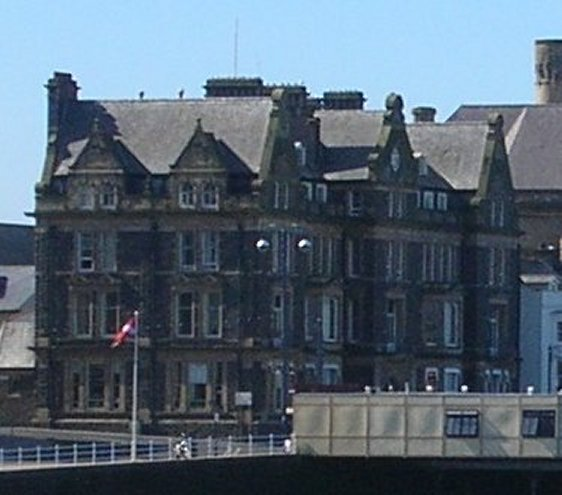
The former United Theological College in Aberystwyth in Wales

From 1983 to 1987 Sell served as the Theological Secretary of the World Communion of Reformed Churches in Geneva, Switzerland. From here he went to the University of Calgary in Canada, where he was appointed to the Chair of Christian Thought (1988-1992). His next post was as Professor of Christian Doctrine and Philosophy of Religion at the United Theological College in Aberystwyth (1992-2001) and the Lampeter School of Theology of the University of Wales. Sell founded the inter-disciplinary Eighteenth-Century Study Group at the University of Calgary; the Centre for the Study of British Christian Thought at Aberystwyth; and the Association of Denominational Historical Societies and Cognate Libraries. Sell was a visiting professor at the University of Chester.

Sell took his PhD at the University of Nottingham (1967) and was a Fellow of the Royal Historical Society, the Royal Society of Antiquaries and was awarded a Doctor of Divinity degree from the University of Manchester in recognition of his numerous published works and distinguished academic career. He held Honorary Doctorates in Divinity from Ursinus College in Pennsylvania and Acadia University in Nova Scotia, and an Honorary Doctorate of Theology from the University of Debrecen in Hungary. Sell was a member of the Doctrine and Worship Committee of the United Reformed Church (1979-1983).

== Personal life ==
He married Karen Elisabeth Lloyd on 1 August 1959 and with her had three children.

Sell lived in Milton Keynes in his later years and he died in February 2016 in the Willen Hospice there.

== Selected publications ==
- The Great Debate: Calvinism, Arminianism and Salvation, Baker Book House, 1983.
- Defending and Declaring the Faith: Some Scottish Examples, 1860-1920 Contributor James B. Torrance. Helmers & Howard, 1987.
- God Our Father, White Mane Pub, 2000 (Revised. 1st Edition, 1980).
- Philosophy in the Eighteenth-Century Dissenting Academies of England and Wales, (p. 75-122) in Volume XI of History of Universities. Ed. Laurence Brockliss. Oxford University Press, 1993.
- Mill on God: the Pervasiveness and Elusiveness of Mill's Religious Thought, Ashgate Publishing, 2004.
- Testimony and Tradition: Studies in Reformed and Dissenting Thought, Ashgate Publishing, 2005.
- Confessing and Commending the Faith: Historic Witness and Apologetic Method, Wipf & Stock Publishers, 2006.
