= Trefeca =

Coordinates: 51.9811°N 3.2478°W

Trefeca (also Trefecca, Trevecca, and Trevecka), located between Talgarth and Llangorse Lake in what is now south Powys in Wales, was the birthplace and home of the 18th-century Methodist leader Howell Harris (1714–1773), (Welsh: Hywel Harris). It was also the site of two Calvinistic Methodist colleges at different times; the first sponsored by Selina, Countess of Huntingdon, (an English Methodist leader) in the late-18th century; the second supported by the Welsh Calvinistic Methodist Church in the later 19th century.

== Teulu Trefeca ==
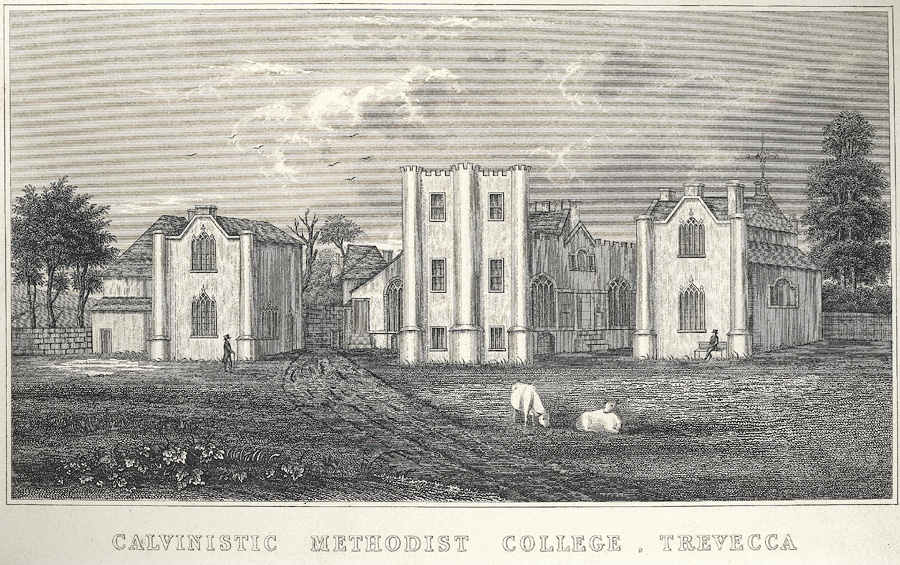
Teulu Trefeca (the building is depicted here in 1860 when in use as a Calvinistic Methodist College)

In 1752, Harris, who was born in Trefeca and was one of the foremost leaders of the Welsh Methodist revival, established a Christian community there known as Teulu Trefeca ('the Trefeca Family'), modelled on the Moravian Herrnhutt community of Count von Zinzendorf.

John Wesley preached for Harris's 'family' when visiting Trevecca in August 1769 for the first anniversary of Trevecca College.

The additions to Harris's family house were in an unusual neo-Gothic architectural style, one of the first examples in Wales, completed by 1772.

== Trevecca College (1768–1792) ==
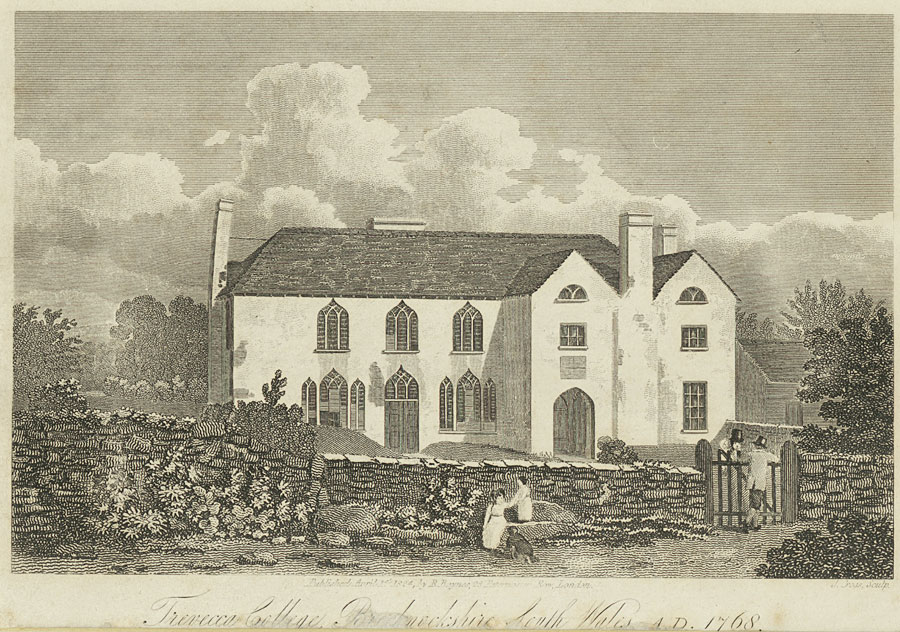
Trevecca College, 1768

In 1768, Selina, Countess of Huntingdon, established a theological seminary in Trevecca. The remote site was chosen partly in order that Harris, the Countess's friend, could keep watch on the new institution for her. The opening of the college coincided with the expulsion from St Edmund Hall, Oxford of six students because of their alleged Methodist leanings. Most of the six were sponsored by Lady Huntingdon to form part of the inaugural student body at her college.

The use of the term 'college' set Trevecca apart from the Dissenting Academies, but was controversial in the mid-eighteenth century, implying some measure of equivalence with the universities of Oxford and Cambridge. Many students at Trevecca, however, were not of sufficient means to attend the ancient universities and, unlike an exclusively scholarly setting, and despite their isolated situation, studies at Trevecca were frequently interrupted by long preaching assignments around Britain.

The college transferred to Cheshunt, Hertfordshire, in 1792. The building used is now a farmhouse (College Farm).

Cheshunt College was later affiliated with the Congregational Union of England and Wales. It moved again in 1906 to Cambridge and merged with Westminster College, Cambridge in 1967.

=== Notable students ===
- Samuel Eyles Pierce, English preacher, theologian, and Calvinist divine
- John Eyre (evangelical minister), co-founder of the London Missionary Society

== Trevecca College (1842–1906) ==
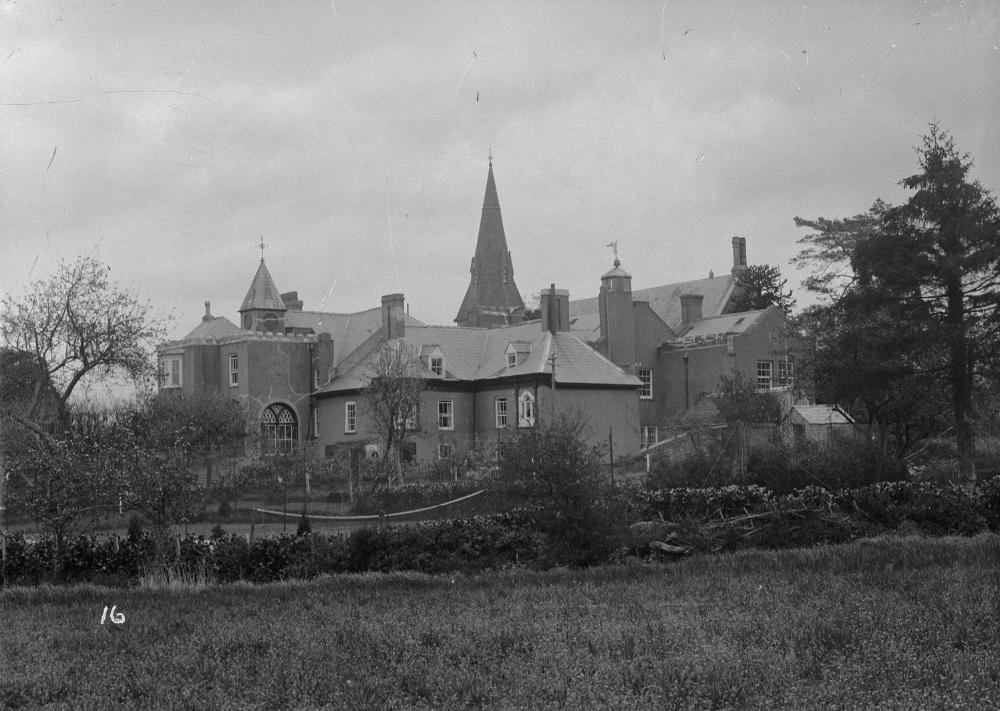
Trefecca College, 191?

Thomas Charles, a Welsh Calvinistic Methodist had tried to arrange for taking over the Trevecca College buildings when the trustees of the Countess of Huntingdon's Connexion removed their seminary to Cheshunt in 1792; but the Bala revival broke out just at the time, and, when things grew quieter, other matters pressed for attention. A college had been mooted in 1816, but the intended tutor died suddenly, and the matter was for the time dropped.

Candidates for the Welsh Calvinistic Methodist Connexional ministry were compelled to shift for themselves until 1837, when Lewis Edwards (1809–1887) and David Charles (1812–1878) opened a school for young men at Bala. North and South alike adopted it as their college, the associations contributing a hundred guineas each towards the education of their students. In 1842, the South Wales Association opened a college at Trevecca in the old home of Howell Harris. The Rev. David Charles became principal of Trevecca (from 1842 to 1863), and the Rev. Lewis Edwards of Bala. After the death of Dr Lewis Edwards, Dr. Thomas Charles Edwards resigned the principalship of the University College at Aberystwyth to become head of Bala (1891), now a purely theological college, the students of which were sent to the university colleges for their classical training.

In 1872, a Harris Memorial Chapel was added to Trefeca, designed by R. G. Thomas of Menai Bridge. The building is now Coleg Trefeca, a lay training centre for the Presbyterian Church of Wales.

In 1905 David Davies of Llandinam, one of the leading laymen in the Connexion, offered a large building at Aberystwyth as a gift to the denomination for the purpose of uniting North and South in one theological college; but in the event of either association declining the proposal, the other was permitted to take possession, giving the association that should decline the option of joining at a later time. The Association of the South accepted, and that of the North declined, the offer; Trevecca College was turned into a preparatory school on the lines of a similar institution set up at Bala in 1891. In 1906 this became the United Theological College in Aberystwyth under its Principal Owen Prys.

=== Howell Harris Museum ===
The Howell Harris Museum is located at Coleg Trefeca. Open by appointment, the exhibits focus on the life of Howell Harris and the community of Teulu Trefeca that he founded.

== See also ==
- Trevecca Nazarene University in Nashville, Tennessee, named after Trevecca College.
