= Ship Street, Oxford =

Street in central Oxford, England

Coordinates: 51.75377°N 1.25721°W

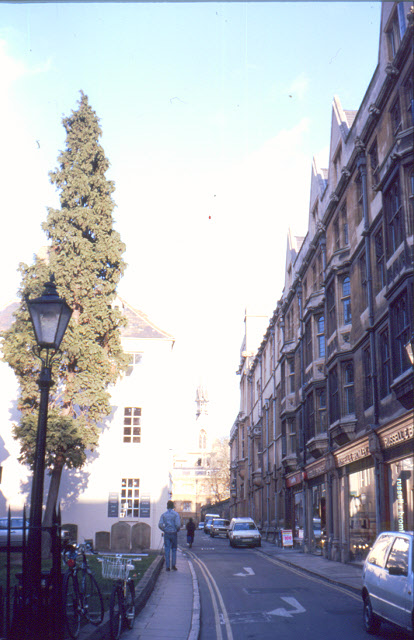
View east from Cornmarket Street along Ship Street.

Ship Street is a short street in central Oxford, England that runs east–west.

== Location ==
The street lies north of Jesus College and west of Exeter College, two of Oxford University's colleges. To the south, at the western end is the Junior Common Room of Jesus and to the eastern end is the same college's Principal's (private) garden. At the western end is St Michael at the Northgate church, near the site of the original north gate in the Oxford city wall. Originally the wall ran just to the north of Ship Street.

At the eastern end once stood the QI Building, a member's club, bookshop and café associated with the comedic quiz show QI television series on BBC2, and established by the comedy producer John Lloyd. The entrance to the building was in Turl Street. The building now plays host to Turl Street Kitchen, a Social Enterprise cafe-bar-restaurant which raises money for the student volunteering charity, Student Hubs.

To the west is the major shopping street, Cornmarket Street, with St Michael's Street opposite, and to the east is the Turl. Market Street runs parallel with Ship Street to the south and Broad Street runs similarly to the north.

== History ==
The street has had a number of names. It was known as Dewy's Lane in the 13th century, after a family who lived there. Its name was Somenor's Lane in 1385. For a time the street was known by the name of Lawrence Hall, which was on the south side of the street, 30–40 yards from Turl Street. The name of "Ship Street" was used from about 1762, after an alehouse in the street. At one time, there was a sheep market in the street and its name is a possible corruption of this. The street used to be much longer than it is today, running east through Catte Street to the city wall at Eastgate.

St Anne's College, when it was still known as the Society of Oxford Home-Students, had its first common room at 16 Ship Street. The annual magazine for former members of the college is entitled The Ship.

There are still many 16th to early 18th century houses in the street that are Grade II listed buildings.

== Gallery ==
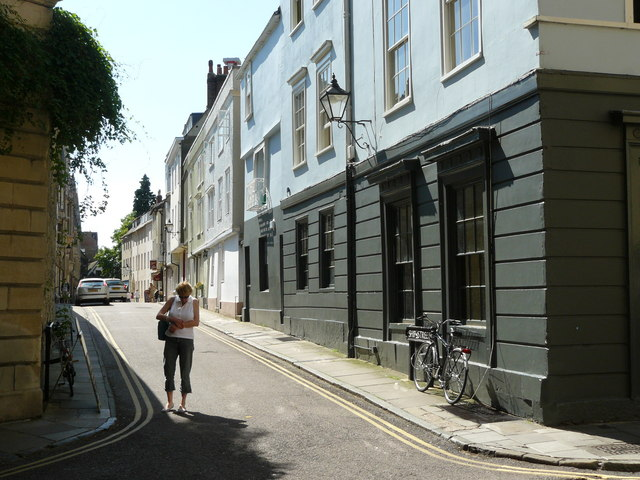
View west from the Turl along Ship Street.

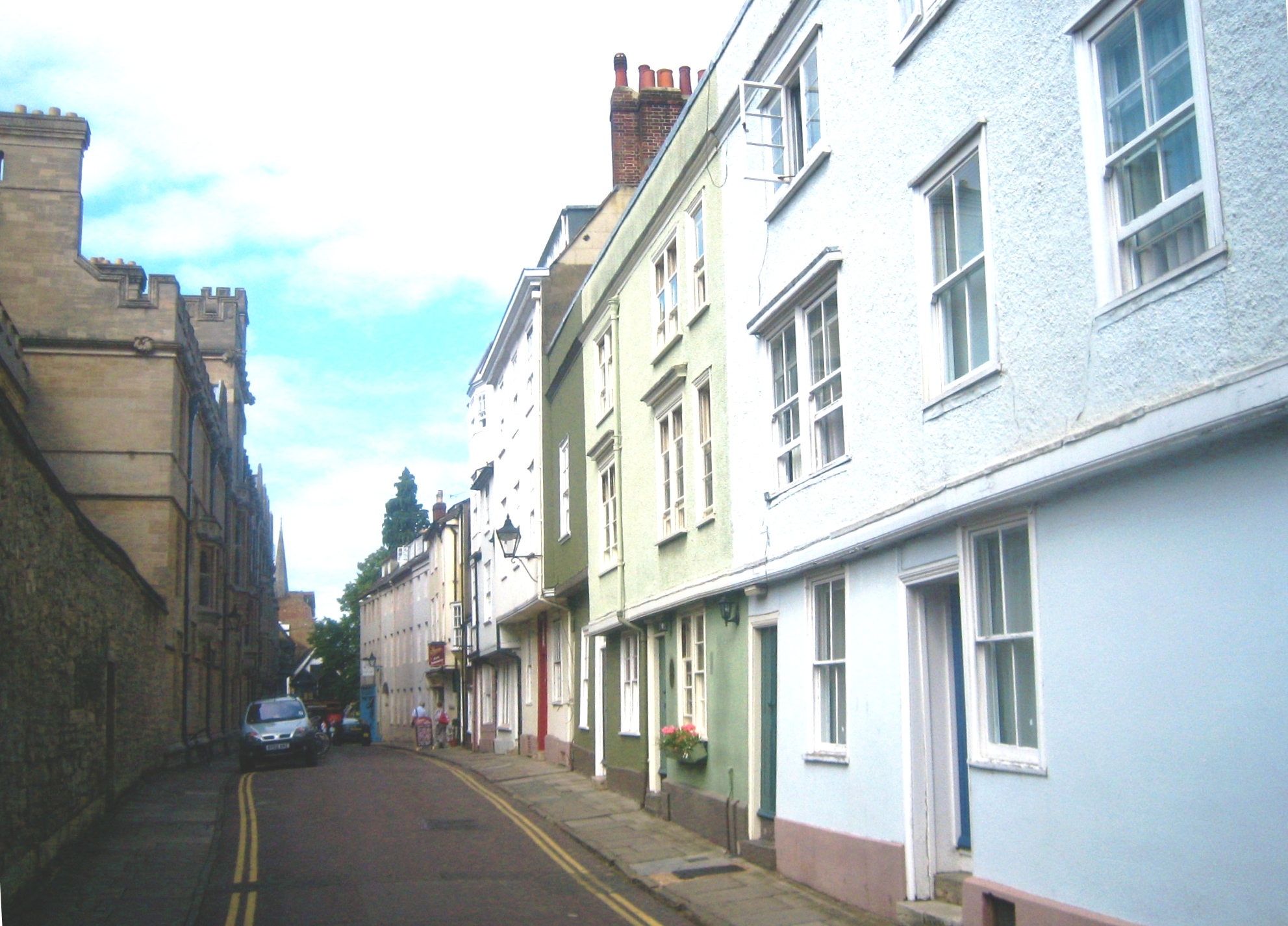
Ship Street, with Jesus College on the left.

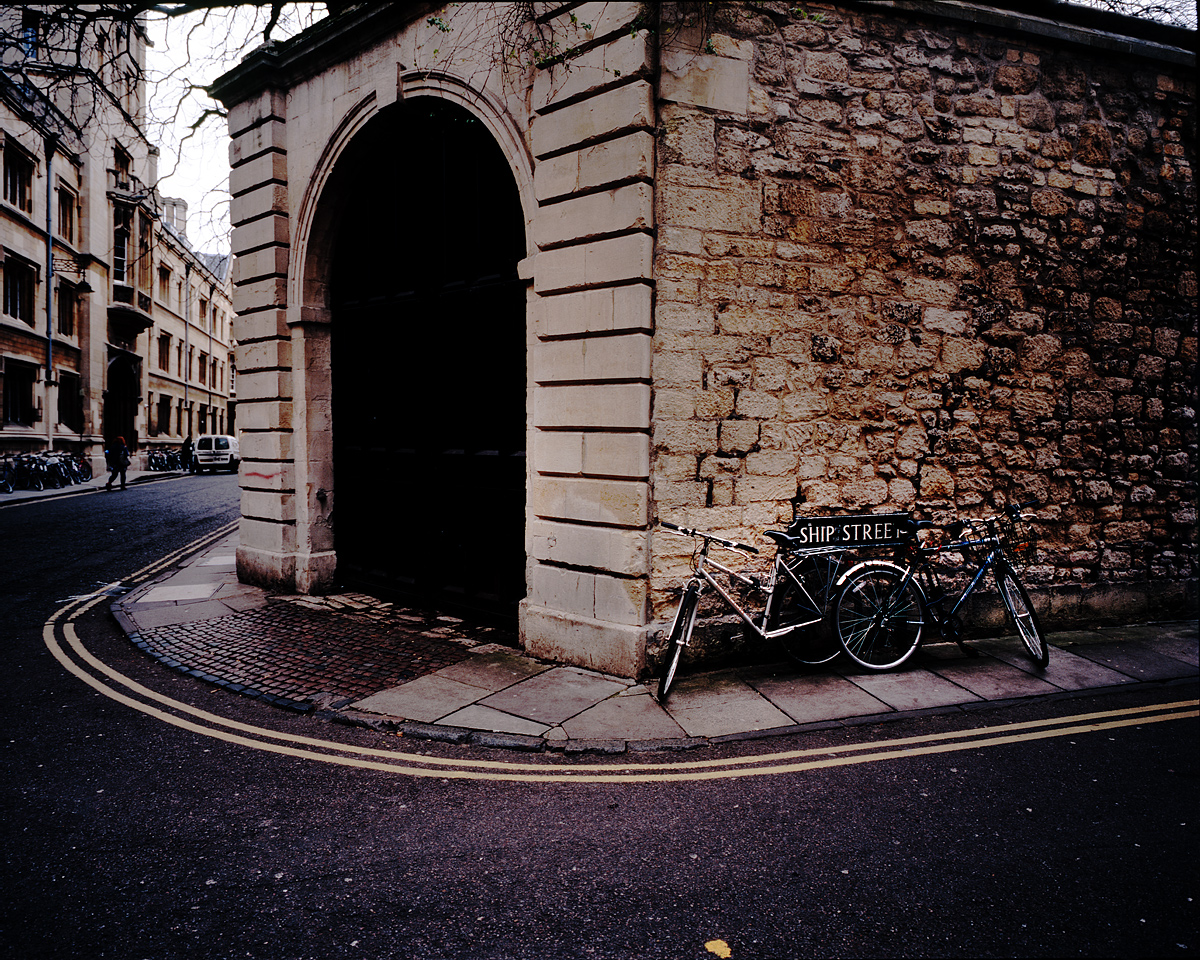
The Jesus College Ship Street entrance on the corner with the Turl, with Exeter College on the left.

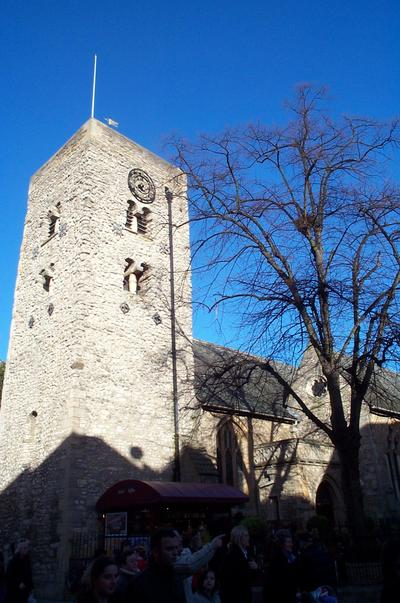
The Saxon tower of St Michael at the Northgate at the eastern end of Ship Street.

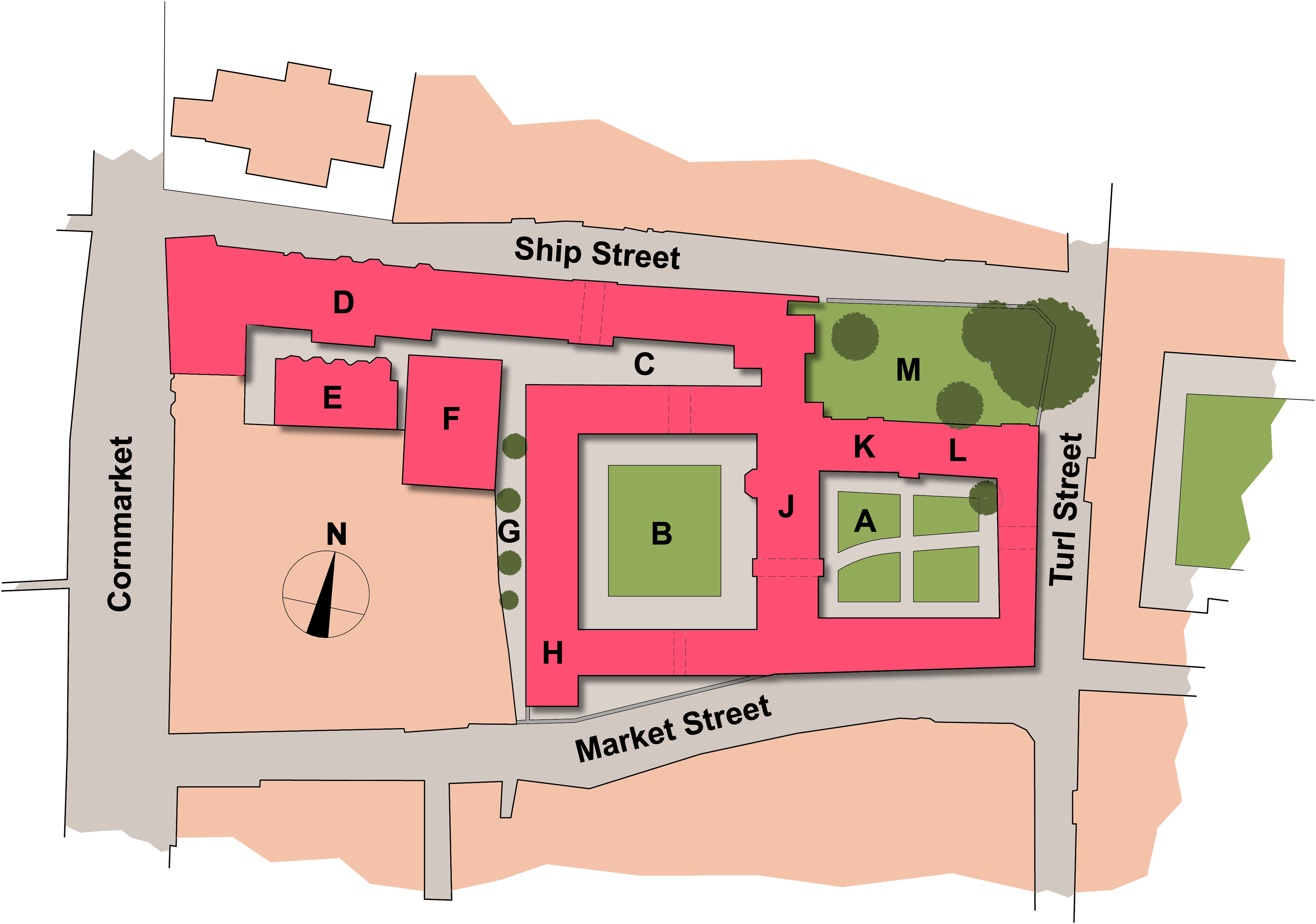
Plan of Jesus College buildings to the south of Ship Street. Key: A= First quadrangle,B=Second quadrangle, C=Third quadrangle, D=Junior Common Room,E=Habakkuk Room, F=Old Members' Building, G=Fellows' Garden,H=Fellows' Library, J=Hall, K=Principal's lodgings, L=Chapel,M=Principal's garden

== See also ==
- Buildings of Jesus College, Oxford
