= Abingdon Arms =

Former pub in Oxford, England

Coordinates: 51.75311°N 1.25704°W

The Abingdon Arms was a public house, originally a coaching inn, in Market Street, Oxford, Oxfordshire, England.

The coaching inn was initially called the Red Lion and opened in 1737. During the second half of the 18th century, it was known as the Lord Abingdon Arms and then the Earl of Abingdon Arms, after the owner of the site, the Earl of Abingdon, from 1750. It then became known as just the Abingdon Arms. Other inns and public houses as well as the Abingdon Arms in Market Street historically (during the 19th century) included the Crown and Thistle, the Roebuck Tap (a.k.a. just the Roebuck), and the Seven Stars. The building was demolished in 1961 and it was replaced by the Oxford Trustee Savings Bank.

== See also ==
- Abingdon Road
- Covered Market, Oxford
- Earl of Abingdon
