= Brasenose Lane =

Lane in central Oxford, England

Coordinates: 51.7535°N 1.2552°W

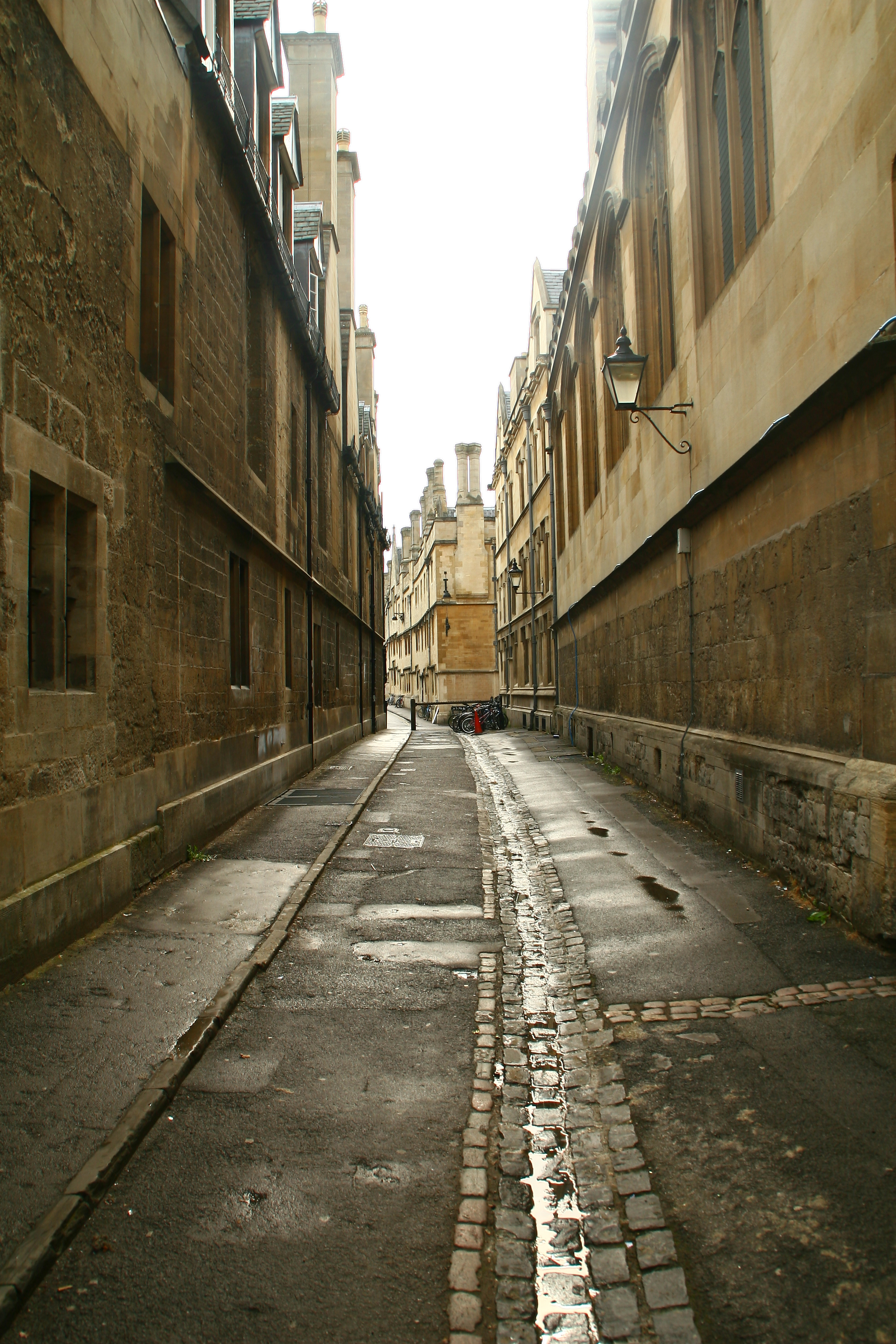
Brasenose Lane from the western end. Lincoln College is on the left and Exeter College is on the right.

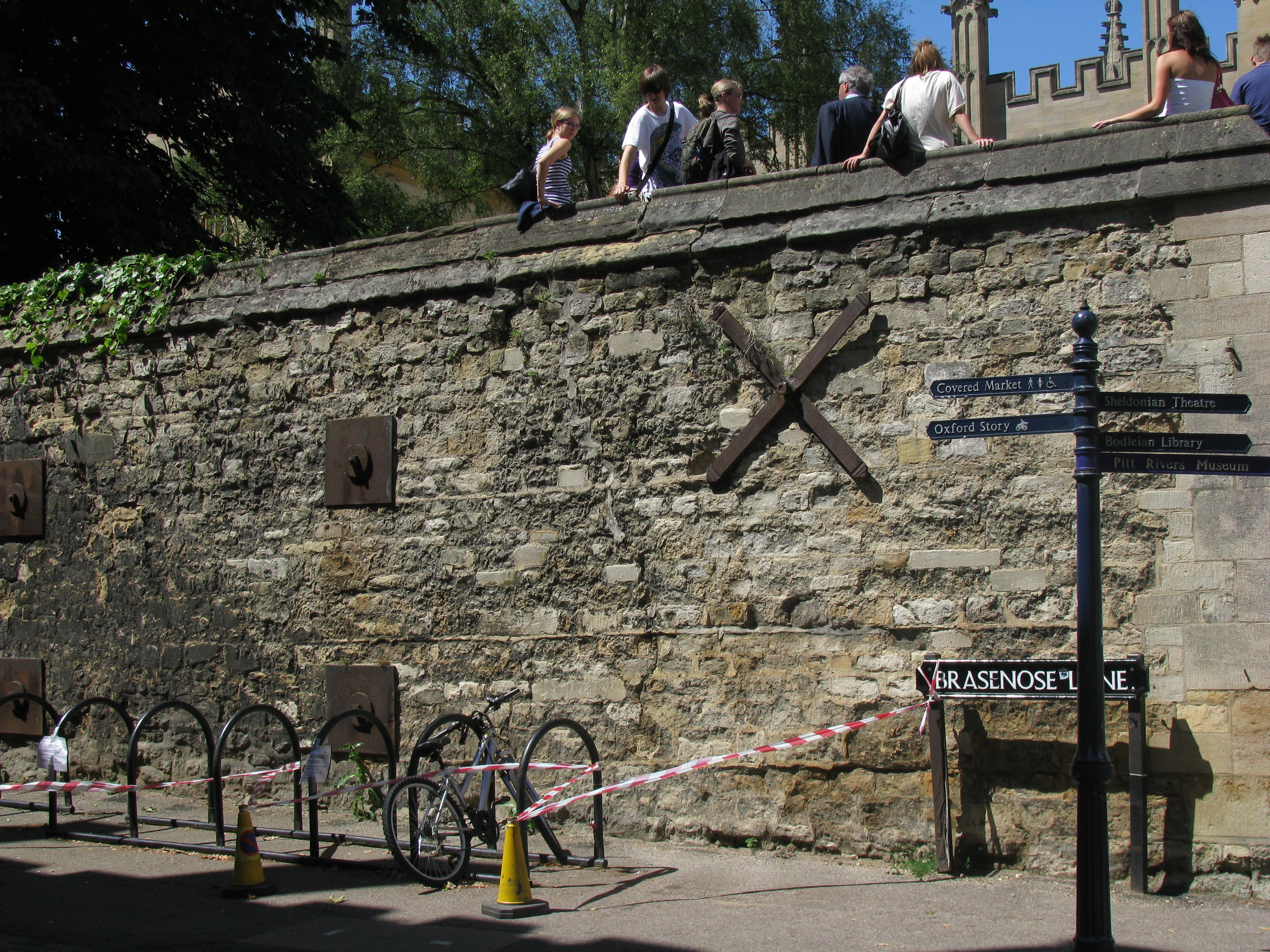
The wall of Exeter College at the eastern end of Brasenose Lane.

Brasenose Lane runs east–west in central Oxford, England, between Turl Street and Radcliffe Square respectively. From Turl Street it is only accessible to pedestrians, but vehicles can enter from Radcliffe Square. The lane retains the medieval pattern of a single drainage channel in its centre and has high stone-faced college buildings on each side, being flanked by three historic Oxford colleges.

The lane is named after Brasenose College which lies immediately to the south. Exeter College lies on the north side. Lincoln College is to the south at the western end of the lane and it continues to the west as Market Street.

The buildings surrounding the lane date from the 15th century. The lane is the last to remain in Oxford with a central gutter, or "kennel".

On 6 November 2022 Lincoln College's JCR voted to "henceforth refer in all capacities to the so-called 'Brasenose' Lane as Lincoln Lane" as part of the ongoing rivalry with Brasenose College.
