= Jesus College, Oxford =

College of the University of Oxford

Jesus College
- University of Oxford
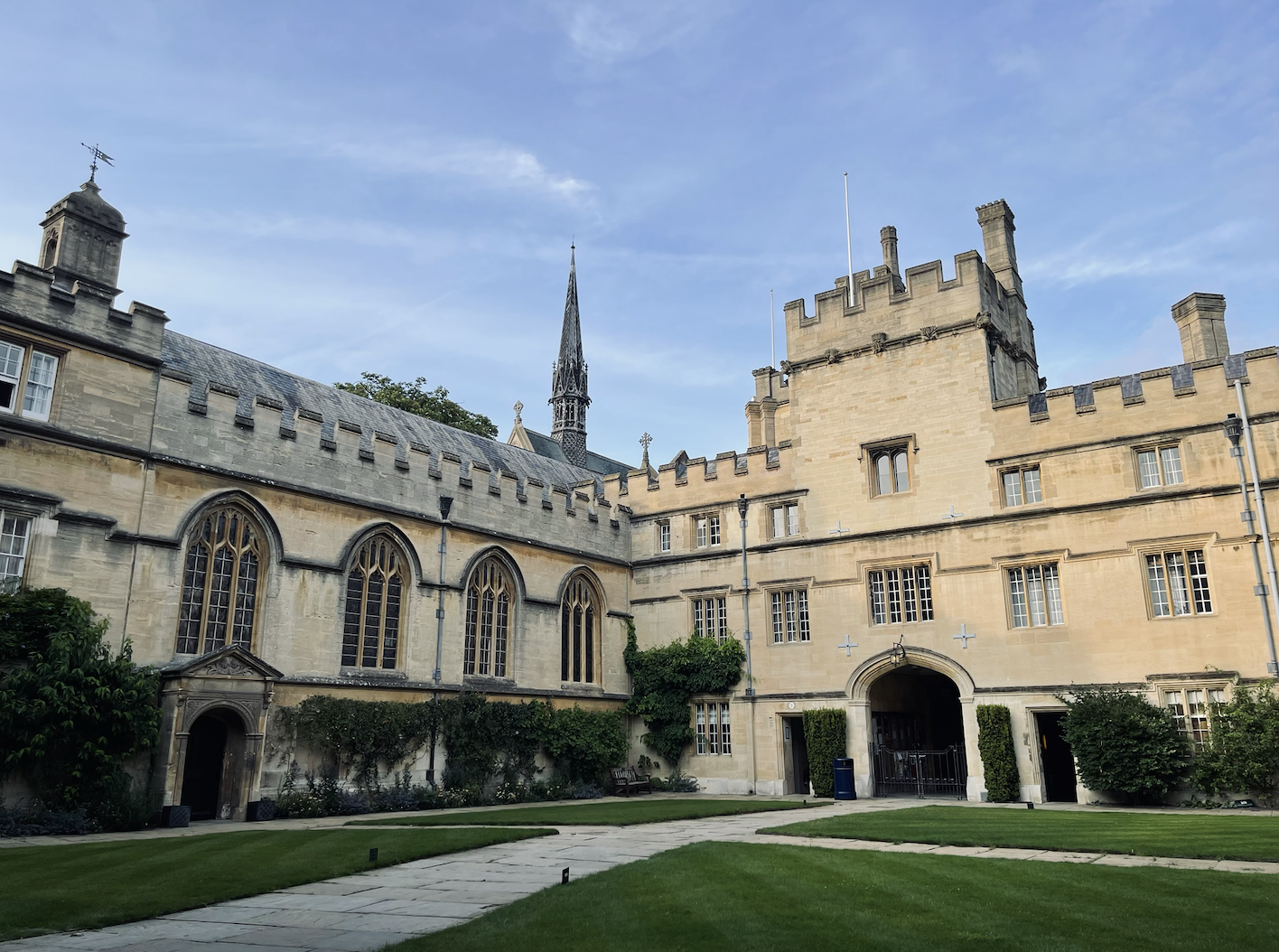
- Jesus College, Oxford first quad

- Arms: Vert, three stags trippant argent attired or.
- Location: Turl Street
- Coordinates: 51.7534°N 1.2569°W
- Full name: Jesus College in the University of Oxford of Queen Elizabeth's Foundation
- Latin name: Collegium Ihesus, Collegium Jesu
- Established: 27 June 1571; 455 years ago
- Named after: Jesus of Nazareth
- Sister college: Jesus College, Cambridge
- Principal: Lindsay Skoll
- Undergraduates: 346 (2017–18)
- Postgraduates: 198
- Endowment: £283 million (2022)
- Visitor: Earls of Pembroke and Montgomery ex officio
- Website: www.jesus.ox.ac.uk
- Boat club: Boat Club website

Map
- Location within Oxford city centre

Jesus College (in full: Jesus College in the University of Oxford of Queen Elizabeth's Foundation) is one of the constituent colleges of the University of Oxford in England. It is in the centre of the city, on a site between Turl Street, Ship Street, Cornmarket Street and Market Street. The college was founded by Queen Elizabeth I on 27 June 1571. A major driving force behind the establishment of the college was Hugh Price (or Ap Rhys), a churchman from Brecon in Wales. The oldest buildings, in the first quadrangle, date from the 16th and early 17th centuries; a second quadrangle was added between about 1640 and about 1713, and a third quadrangle was built in about 1906. Further accommodation was built on the main site to mark the 400th anniversary of the college, in 1971, and student flats have been constructed at sites in north and east Oxford. A fourth quadrangle was completed in 2021.

There are about 475 students at any one time; the Principal of the college is Lindsay Skoll. Former students include Harold Wilson (who was twice Prime Minister of the United Kingdom), Kevin Rudd (Prime Minister of Australia), Norman Washington Manley (Prime Minister of Jamaica), T. E. Lawrence ("Lawrence of Arabia"), Angus Buchanan (winner of the Victoria Cross), Viscount Sankey (Lord Chancellor), Edwin Yoder (Pulitzer Prize winning journalist), Roger Parry (media and technology entrepreneur) and over 30 Members of Parliament. Past or present fellows of the college include the historians Sir Goronwy Edwards, Yuval Noah Harari and Niall Ferguson, the philosopher Galen Strawson, and the political philosopher John Gray. Past students and fellows in the sciences include John Houghton (physicist) and Nobel Laureate Peter J. Ratcliffe.

== History ==
=== Foundation ===
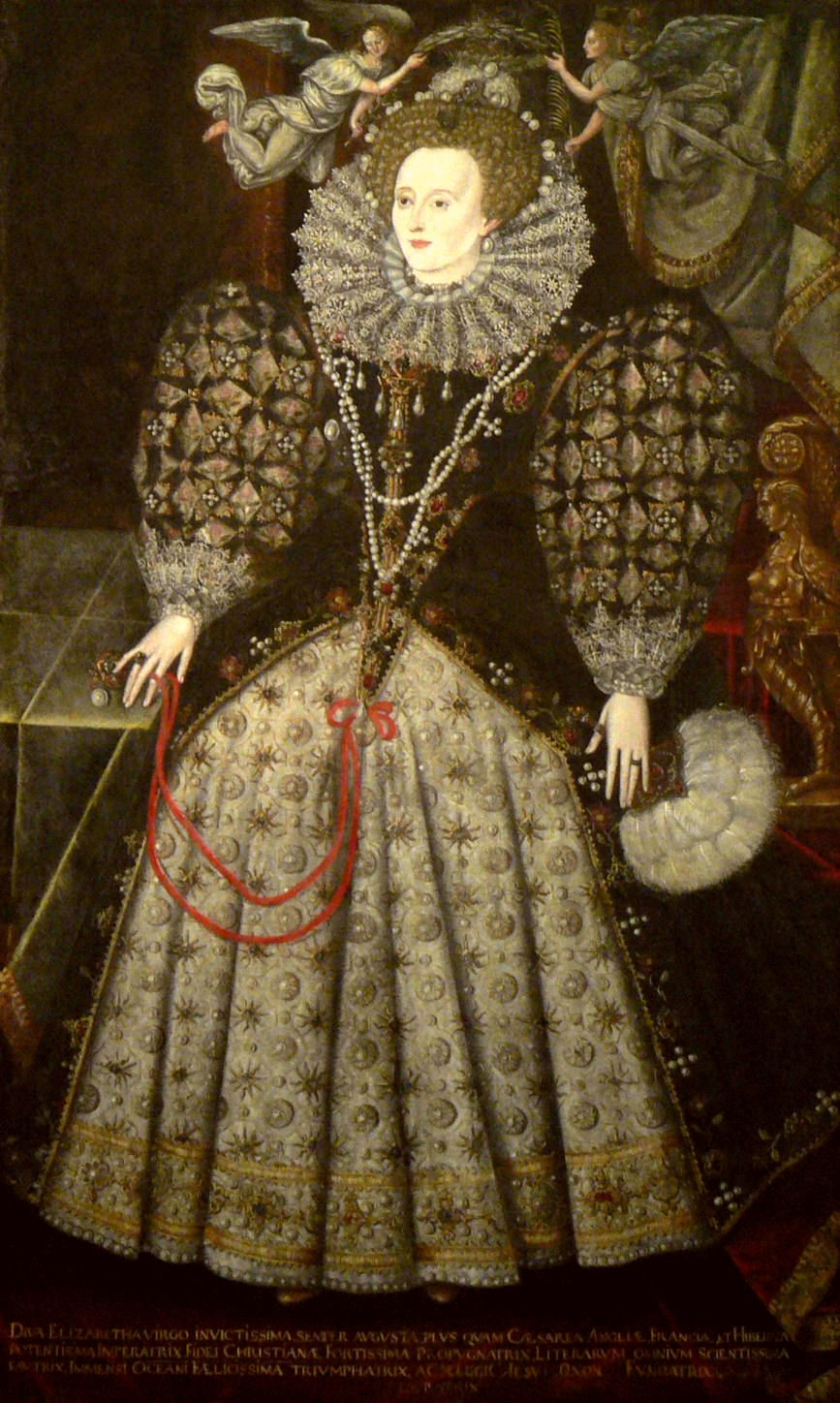
The college's founder, Queen Elizabeth I, shown in a portrait in the college hall

Jesus College was founded on 27 June 1571, when Elizabeth I issued a royal charter. It was the first Protestant college to be founded at the university, and it is the only Oxford college to date from Elizabeth's reign. It was the first new Oxford college since 1555, in the reign of Queen Mary, when Trinity College and St John's College were founded as Roman Catholic colleges. The foundation charter named a principal (David Lewis), eight fellows, eight scholars, and eight commissioners to draw up the statutes for the college. The commissioners included Hugh Price, who had petitioned the queen to found a college at Oxford "that he might bestow his estate of the maintenance of certain scholars of Wales to be trained up in good letters." The charter also transferred to the college the land and buildings of White Hall, an academic hall on part of the current site. The college was originally intended primarily for the education of clergy. The particular intention was to satisfy a need for dedicated, learned clergy to promote the Elizabethan Religious Settlement in the parishes of England, Ireland and Wales. The college has since broadened the range of subjects offered, beginning with the inclusion of medicine and law, and now offers almost the full range of subjects taught at the university. The letters patent issued by Elizabeth I made it clear that the education of a priest in the 16th century included more than just theology, however:

...to the Glory of God Almighty and Omnipotent, and for the spread and maintenance of the Christian religion in its sincere form, for the eradication of errors and heresies, for the increase and perpetuation of true loyalty, for the extension of good literature of every sort, for the knowledge of languages, for the education of youth in loyalty, morality, and methodical learning, for the relief of poverty and distress, and lastly for the benefit and well-being of the Church of Christ in our realms, [...] we have decreed that a College of learning in the sciences, philosophy, humane pursuits, knowledge of the Hebrew, Greek and Latin languages, to the ultimate profession of Sacred Theology, to last for all time to come, be created, founded, built, and established....

— Elizabeth I, 27 June 1571.

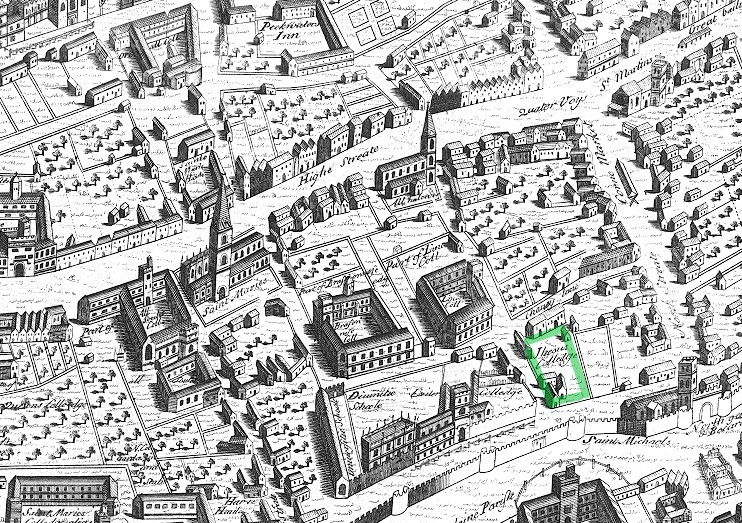
Part of Ralph Agas's map of Oxford (1578) (south at the top), with the early college plan (highlighted) near the city wall

Price continued to be closely involved with the college after its foundation. On the strength of a promised legacy, worth £60 a year on his death (approximately £19,800 in present-day terms), he requested and received the authority to appoint the new college's principal, fellows and scholars. He financed early building work in the college's front quadrangle, but on his death in 1574 it transpired that the college received only a lump sum of around £600 (approximately £198,000 in present-day terms). Problems with his bequest meant that it was not received in full for about 25 years. As the college had no other donors at this time, "for many years the college had buildings but no revenue".

=== 17th century ===
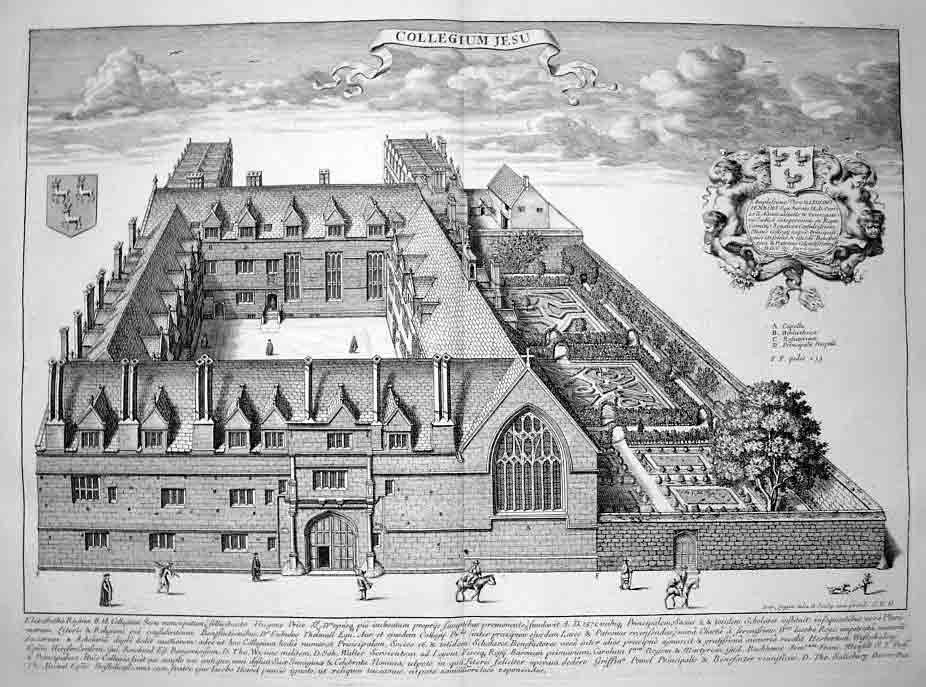
College engraving, 1675

The main benefactor, other than the King, was Eubule Thelwall, from Ruthin, North Wales, who became Principal in 1621; he succeeded in securing a new charter and statutes for the college from James I, having spent £5,000 of his own money on the hall and chapel, which earned him the title of its second founder. Thelwall died on 8 October 1630, aged 68 and was buried in Jesus College Chapel where a monument was erected to his memory by his brother Sir Bevis Thelwall (Page of the King's Bedchamber and Clerk of the Great Wardrobe).

Other benefactions in the 17th century include Herbert Westfaling, the Bishop of Hereford, who left enough property to support two fellowships and scholarships (with the significant proviso that "my kindred shallbe always preferred before anie others"). Sir Eubule Thelwall (principal 1621–1630) spent much of his own money on the construction of a chapel, hall and library for the college. The library, constructed above an over-weak colonnade, was pulled down under the principalship of Francis Mansell (1630–1649), who also built two staircases of residential accommodation to attract the sons of Welsh gentry families to the college.

The English Civil War "all but destroyed the corporate life of the college." Mansell was removed from his position as principal and Michael Roberts was installed. After the Restoration, Mansell was briefly reinstated as principal, before resigning in favour of Leoline Jenkins. It was Jenkins (principal 1661–1673) who secured the long-term viability of the college. On his death, in 1685, he bequeathed a large complex of estates, acquired largely by lawyer friends from the over-mortgaged landowners of the Restoration period. These estates allowed the college's sixteen fellowships and scholarships to be filled for the first time – officially, sixteen of each had been supported since 1622, but the college's income was too small to keep all occupied simultaneously. In 1713, the bequest of Welsh clergyman and former student Edmund Meyricke established a number of scholarships for students from north Wales, although these are now available to all Welsh students.

=== 18th and 19th centuries ===
The 18th century, in contrast to the disruption of the 17th century, was a comparatively quiet time for the college. A historian of the college, J. N. L. Baker, wrote that the college records for this time "tell of little but routine entries and departures of fellows and scholars". The Napoleonic Wars saw a reduction in the numbers of students and entries in the records for the purchase of muskets and other items for college members serving in the university corps. After the war, numbers rose, to an average of twenty new students per year between 1821 and 1830. However, debts owed to the college had increased, perhaps due to the economic effects of the war – by 1832, the college was owed £986 10s 5d (approximately £95500 in present-day terms). During the first half of the 19th century, the academic strength of the college diminished: scholarships were sometimes not awarded because of a lack of suitable candidates, and numbers fell: there were only seven new entrants in 1842. Ernest Hardy wrote in his history of the college in 1899 that it had been becoming "increasingly evident for years... that the exclusive connection with Wales was ruining the college as a place of education."

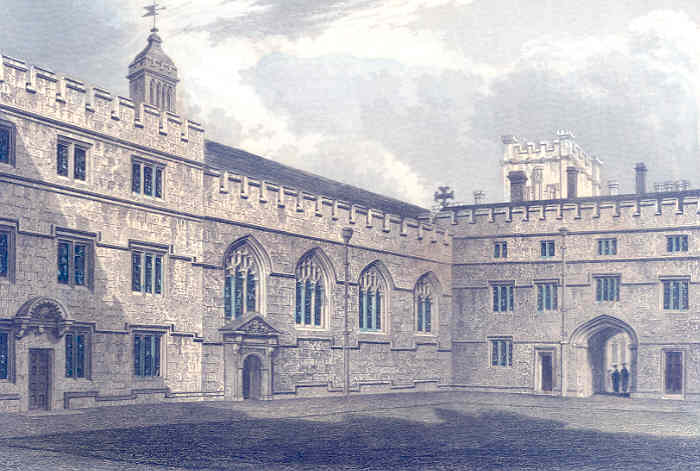
An 1837 engraving of the first quadrangle

A Royal Commission was appointed in 1852 to investigate the university. The college wished to retain its links with Wales, and initial reforms were limited despite the wishes of the commissioners: those scholarships that were limited to particular parts of Wales were opened to the whole of Wales, and half of the fellowships awarded were to remain open only to Welshmen "'if and so long as the Principal and Fellows shall deem it expedient for the interests of education in connection with the Principality of Wales'". All the scholarships at the college, except for two, and all the exhibitions were still restricted to students from Wales. The numbers of students at the college still fell, despite prizes being awarded for success in university examinations. Daniel Harper, principal from 1877 to 1895, noted the continuing academic decline. Speaking in 1879, he noted that fewer students from the college were reaching high standards in examinations, and that more Welsh students were choosing to study at other Oxford colleges in preference to Jesus. A further Royal Commission was appointed. This led to further changes at the college: in 1882, the fellowships reserved to Welshmen were made open to all, and only half (instead of all) of the 24 scholarships were to be reserved for Welsh candidates. Thereafter, numbers gradually rose and the non-Welsh element at the college increased, so that by 1914 only about half of the students were Welsh.

=== 20th century ===
During the First World War, "the college in the ordinary sense almost ceased to exist". From 129 students in the summer of 1914, numbers dropped to 36 in the spring of 1916. Some refugee students from Belgium and Serbia lodged in empty rooms in the college during 1916, and officers of the Royal Flying Corps resided from August 1916 to December 1918. After the war, numbers rose and fellowships were added in new subjects: history (1919 and 1933); theology (1927); physics (1934); a second fellowship in chemistry (1924); and modern languages (lectureship 1921, fellowship 1944). The improved teaching led to greater success in university examinations and prizes.

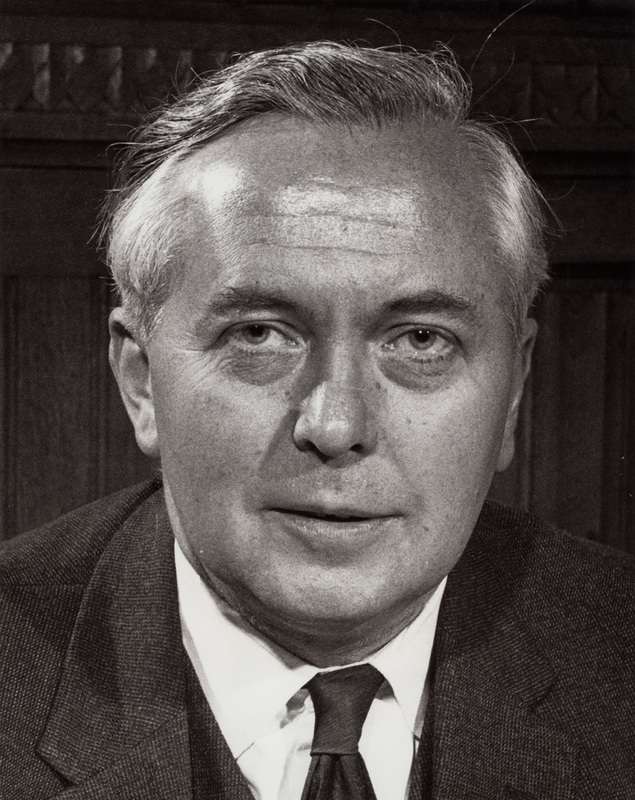
Harold Wilson, who was twice Prime Minister of the United Kingdom, studied Politics, Philosophy, and Economics (PPE) at Jesus College, graduating with first class honours.

In the inter-war years (1918–1939) Jesus was seen by some as a small college and something of a backwater; it attracted relatively few pupils from the public schools traditionally seen as the most prestigious. The college did, however, attract many academically able entrants from the grammar schools (particularly those in northern England and Scotland). Among these grammar-school boys was Harold Wilson, who would later become Prime Minister of the United Kingdom. During the Second World War, many of the fellows served in the armed forces or carried out war work in Oxford. The college remained full of students, though, as it provided lodgings for students from other colleges whose buildings had been requisitioned, and also housed officers on military courses.

The college had its own science laboratories from 1907 to 1947, which were overseen (for all but the last three years) by the physical chemist David Chapman, a fellow of the college from 1907 to 1944. At the time of their closure, they were the last college-based science laboratories at the university. They were named the Sir Leoline Jenkins laboratories, after a former principal of the college. The laboratories led to scientific research and tuition (particularly in chemistry) becoming an important part of the college's academic life. The brochure produced for the opening ceremony noted that the number of science students at the college had increased rapidly in recent years, and that provision of college laboratories would assist the tuition of undergraduates, as well as attracting to Jesus College graduates of the University of Wales who wished to continue their research at Oxford. A link between one of the college science lecturers and Imperial Chemical Industries (ICI) led to 17 students joining ICI between the two World Wars, some, such as John Rose, reaching senior levels in the company. The laboratories became unnecessary when the university began to provide centralised facilities for students; they were closed in 1947.

The quatercentenary of the college, in 1971, saw the opening of the Old Members' Buildings in the third quadrangle. Further student accommodation has been built at the sports ground and at a site in north Oxford. In 1974, Jesus was among the first group of five men's colleges to admit women as members, the others being Brasenose, Wadham, Hertford and St Catherine's; between one-third and one-half of the undergraduates are women. A long-standing rivalry with nearby Exeter College reached a peak in 1979, with seven police vehicles and three fire engines involved in dealing with trouble in Turl Street. Sir John Habakkuk (principal 1967–1984) and Sir Peter North (principal 1984–2005) both served terms as Vice-Chancellor of the university, from 1973 to 1977 and from 1993 to 1997 respectively.

=== 21st century ===
The hereditary visitor of the college remains the Earls of Pembroke and Montgomery ex officio. The current visitor is William Herbert, 18th Earl of Pembroke, 15th Earl of Montgomery. Jesus, Magdalene College, Cambridge and Sidney Sussex College, Cambridge are the only three Oxbridge colleges that continue to prescribe by statute visitations held by hereditary peers.

== Location and buildings ==
The main buildings are located in the centre of Oxford, between Turl Street, Ship Street, Cornmarket Street and Market Street. The main entrance is on Turl Street. The buildings are arranged in four quadrangles, the first quadrangle containing the oldest college buildings and the fourth quadrangle the newest. The foundation charter gave to the college a site between Market Street and Ship Street (which is still occupied by the college) as well as the buildings of a defunct university academic hall on the site, called White Hall. The buildings that now surround the first quadrangle were erected in stages between 1571 and the 1620s; the principal's lodgings were the last to be built. Progress was slow because the new college lacked the "generous endowments" that earlier colleges enjoyed. Before new buildings were completed, the students lived in the old buildings of White Hall.

=== First quadrangle ===
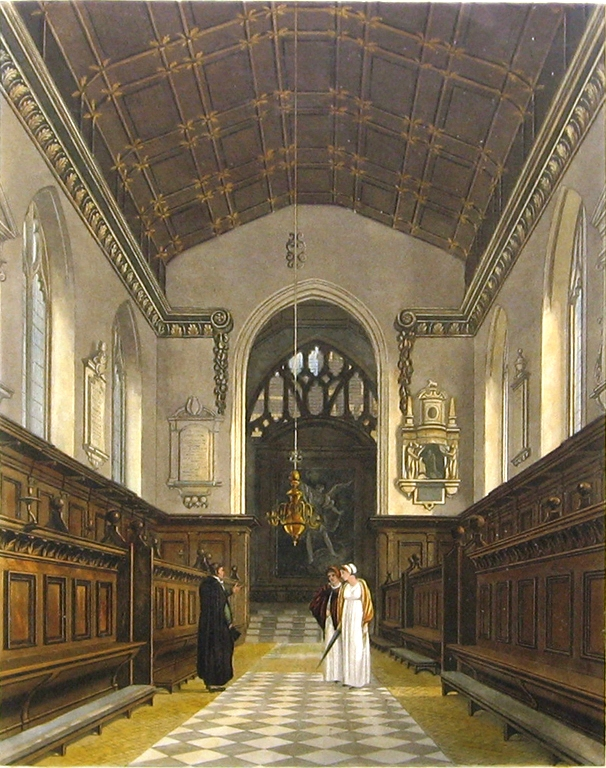
The interior of the chapel (depicted in 1814, before alterations in the mid-19th century)

The chapel was dedicated on 28 May 1621, and extended in 1636. The architectural historian Giles Worsley has described the chapel's east window (added in 1636) as an instance of Gothic Revival architecture, rather than Gothic Survival, since a choice was made to use an outdated style – classical architecture had become accepted as "the only style in which it was respectable to build". Jonathan Edwards (principal from 1686 to 1712) is reported to have spent £1,000 (approximately £178,500 in present-day terms) during his lifetime on the interior of the chapel, including the addition of a screen separating the main part of the chapel from the ante-chapel (at the west end) in 1693. In 1853, stained glass by George Hedgeland was added to the east window. In 1863, the architect George Edmund Street was appointed to renovate the chapel. The arch of the chancel was widened, the original Jacobean woodwork was removed (save for the screen donated by Edwards and the pulpit), new seats were installed, new paving was placed in the main part of the chapel and a stone reredos was added behind the altar. Views of the changes have differed. On 21 October 1864, Building News reported that the restoration was nearing completion and was of "a very spirited character". It said that the new "handsome" arch showed the east window "to great advantage", with "other improvements" including a "handsome reredos". Ernest Hardy, principal from 1921 to 1925, said that the work was "ill-considered", described the reredos as "somewhat tawdry" and said that the Jacobean woodwork had been sold off too cheaply. In contrast, the architectural historian Nikolaus Pevsner called the reredos "heavily gorgeous".

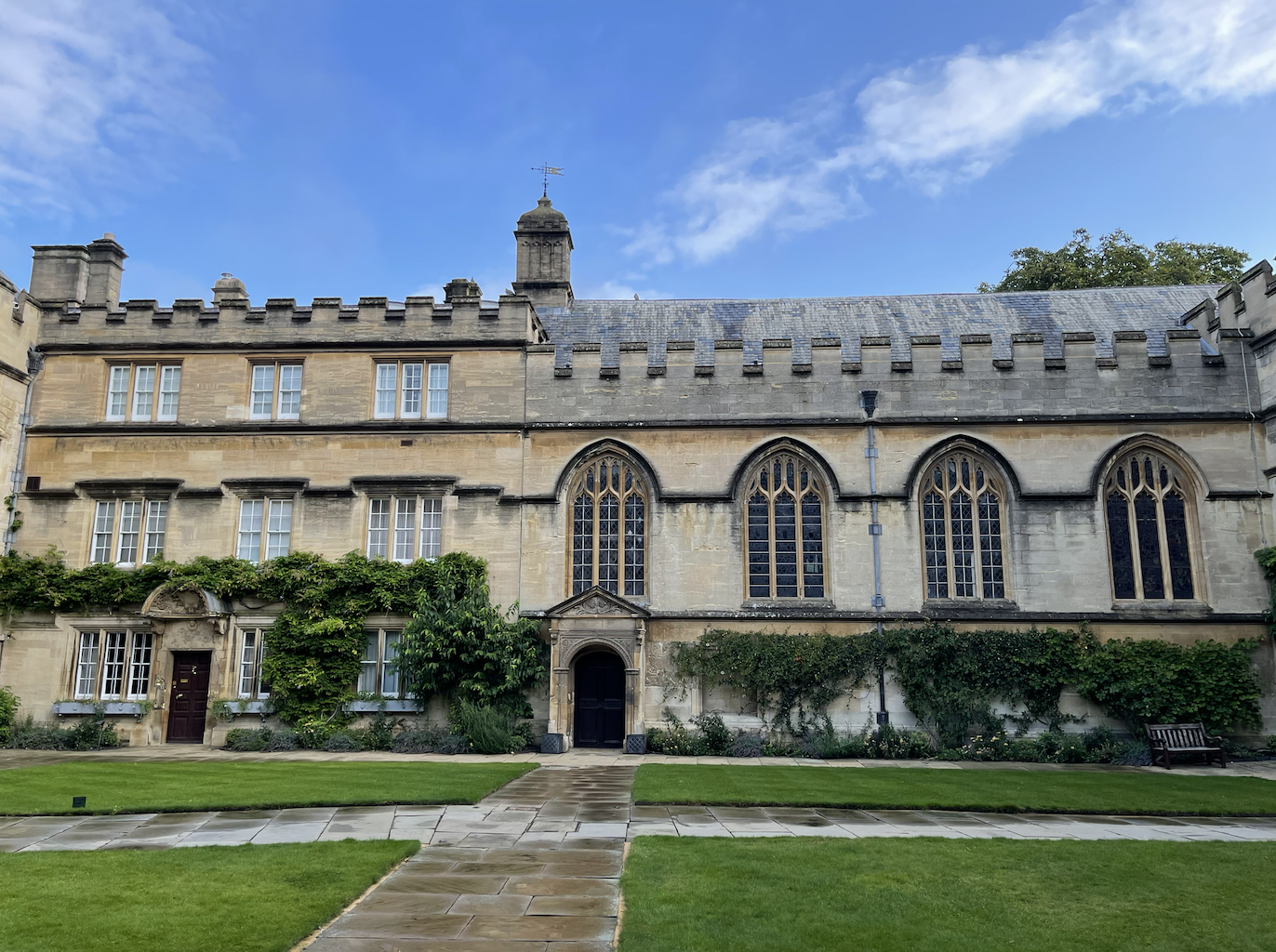
View of the Principal's Lodging in the first quad

The principal of the college resides in the lodgings, a Grade I listed building, on the north side of the first quadrangle between the chapel (to the east) and the hall (to the west). They were the last part of the first quadrangle to be built. Sir Eubule Thelwall, principal from 1621 to 1630, built the lodgings at his own expense, to include (in the words of the antiquarian Anthony Wood) "a very fair dining-room adorned with wainscot curiously engraven". The shell-hood over the doorway (which Pevsner called "beautiful") was added at some point between 1670 and 1740; Pevsner dates it to about 1700.

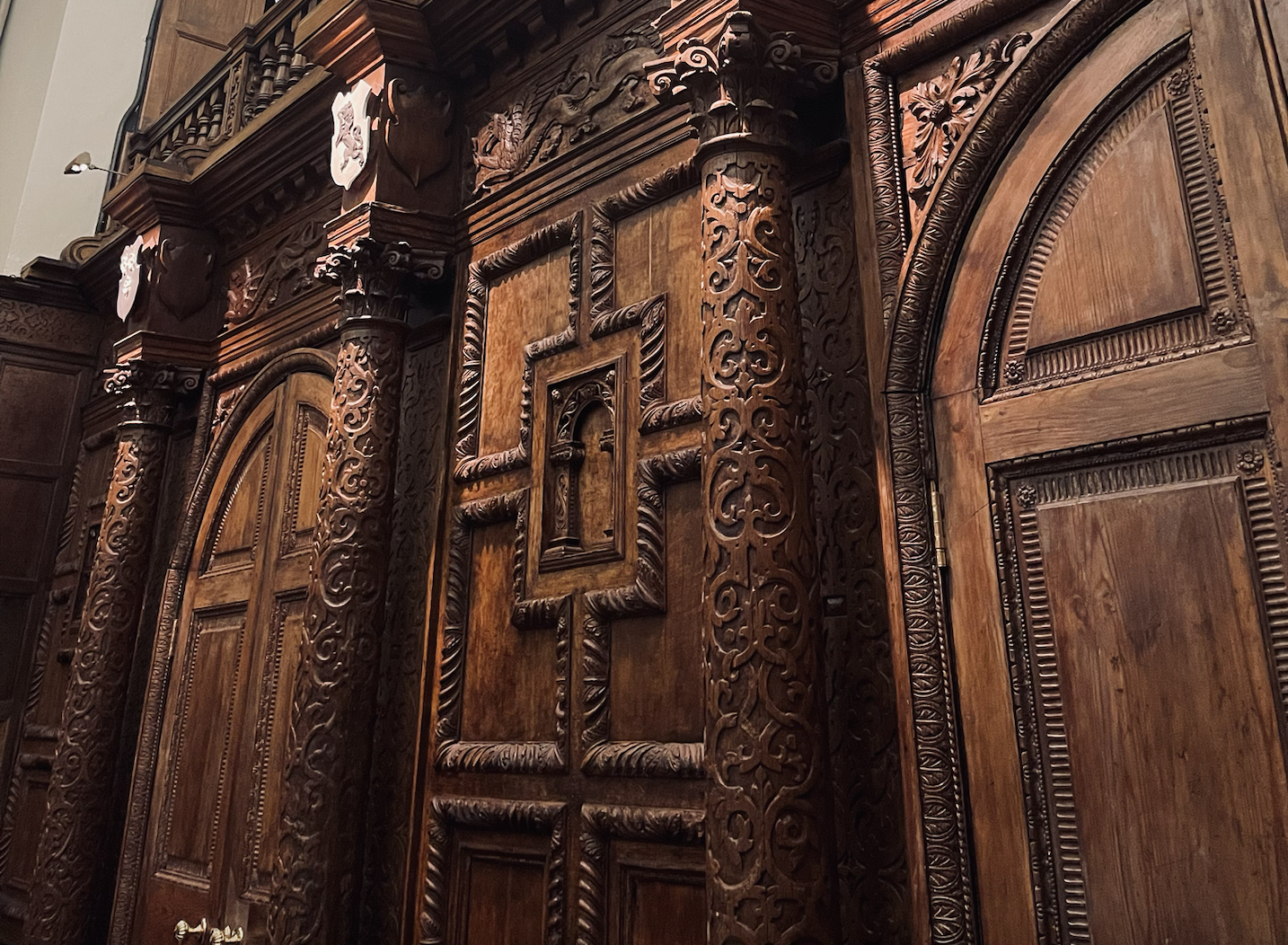
Wood paneling detail dating to the early 1600s in the Jesus College Oxford dining hall. The hall, like the chapel, was largely built by Griffith Powell between 1613 and 1620, and was finally completed soon after his death in 1620. A wooden paneled screen (depicted) was installed in 1634.

The hall has been said to be "among the most impressive of all the Oxford college halls", with its "fine panelling, austere ceiling, and its notable paintings". Like the chapel, it was largely built by Griffith Powell between 1613 and 1620, and was finally completed soon after his death in 1620. Pevsner noted the "elaborately decorated columns" of the screen (installed in 1634) and the dragons along the frieze, and said that it was one of the earliest examples in Oxford of panelling using four "L" shapes around a centre. In 1741 and 1742, the oak-beamed roof was covered with plaster to make rooms in the roof space. Pevsner described the 1741 cartouche on the north wall, which contains the college crest, as "large [and] rich". The hall contains a portrait of Elizabeth I, as well as portraits of former principals and benefactors. There are also portraits by court artists of two other monarchs who were college benefactors: Charles I (by Anthony van Dyck) and Charles II (by Sir Peter Lely).

=== Second quadrangle ===
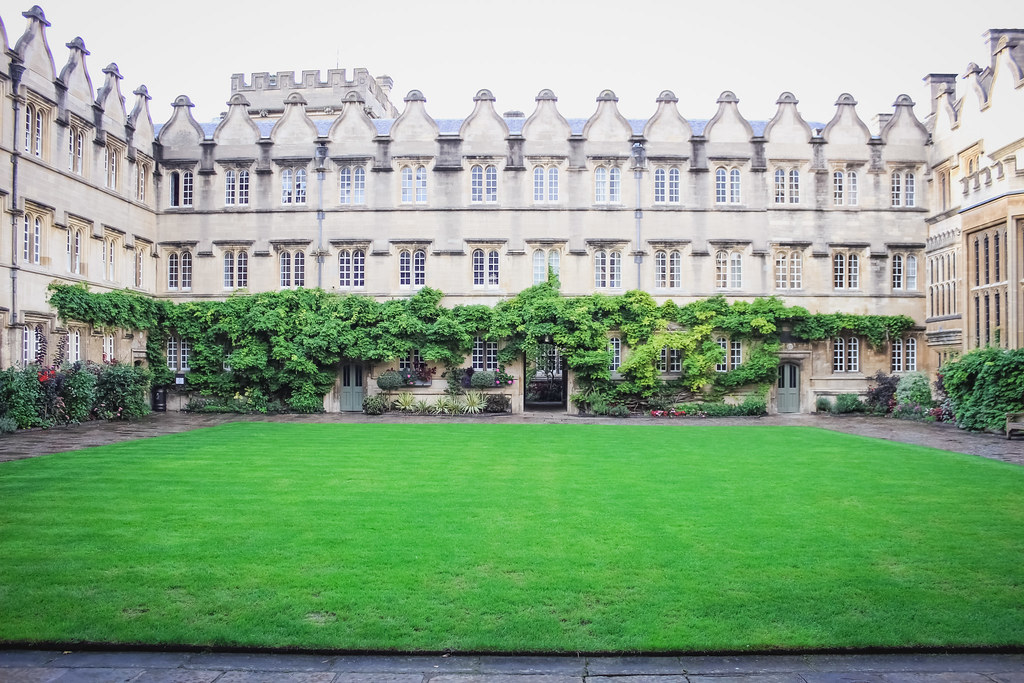
North facing view of the second Quadrangle with the Dutch gables around the top of the buildings and flora visible

In 1640, Francis Mansell (appointed principal in 1630) began construction of a second quadrangle with buildings along the north and south sides; further work was interrupted by the English Civil War. Work began again in 1676, and the library (now the Fellows' Library) was completed by 1679. Under Jonathan Edwards (principal from 1688 to 1712), further rooms were built to complete the quadrangle; the project was completed just after his death in 1712. Pevsner described the second quadrangle as "a uniform composition", noting the "regular fenestration by windows with round-arched lights, their hood-moulds forming a continuous frieze". The Dutch gables have ogee sides and semi-circular pediments. The writer Simon Jenkins said that the quadrangle has "the familiar Oxford Tudor windows and decorative Dutch gables, crowding the skyline like Welsh dragons' teeth and lightened by exuberant flower boxes".

The Fellows' Library contains bookcases decorated with strapwork dating from about 1628, which were used in an earlier library in the college. Hardy's opinion was that, "if only it had an open timber roof instead of the plain ceiling, it would be one of the most picturesque College Libraries". Another author said (in 1914, after the provision of a library for undergraduates elsewhere in the quadrangle) that it was "one of the most charming of Oxford libraries, and one of the least frequented". It holds 11,000 antiquarian printed books and houses many of the college's rare texts, including a Greek bible dating from 1545 and signed by Philipp Melanchthon and others, much of the library of the scholar and philosopher Lord Herbert of Cherbury and 17th-century volumes by Robert Boyle and Sir Isaac Newton.

=== Third quadrangle ===
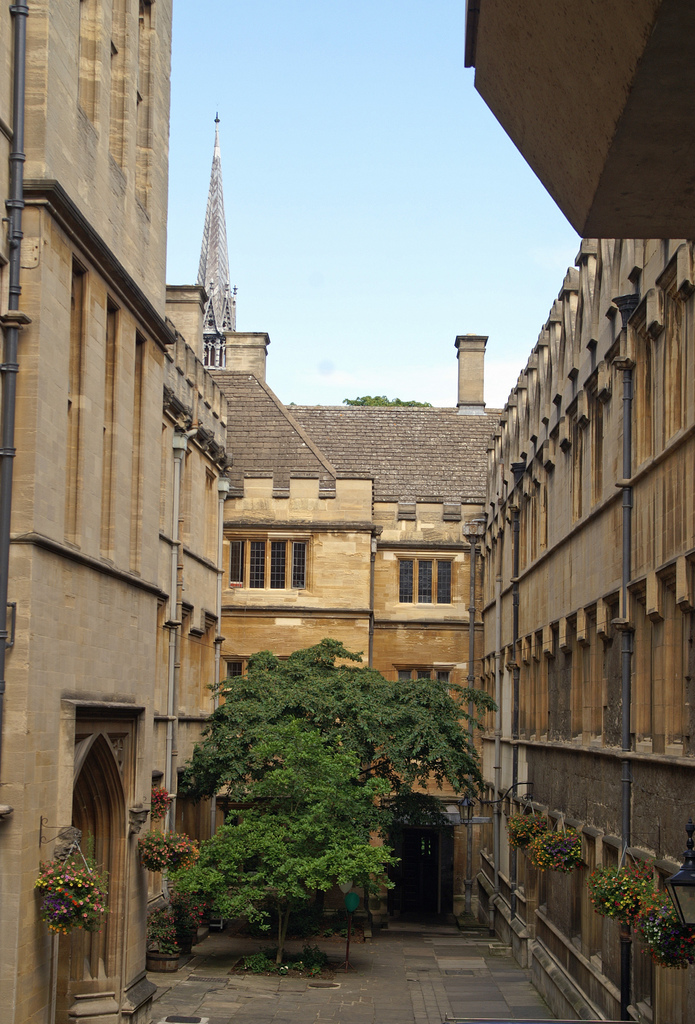
The third quadrangle from the steps of the Old Members' Building looking east; the Ship Street entrance is through the archway on the left; the spire in the distance is the chapel of Exeter College.

The long but narrow third quadrangle adjoins Ship Street, on the north of the site and to the west of the garden of the principal's lodgings, where the college has owned some land since its foundation. In the 18th century, this was home to the college stables. A fire in 1904 led to the demolition of the stables and the gateway to Ship Street. Replacement buildings adjoining Ship Street, effectively creating a third quadrangle for the college, were constructed between 1906 and 1908. It contained the college's science laboratories (now closed) and a new gate-tower, as well as further living accommodation and a library for students, known as the Meyricke Library, after a major donor – there had been an undergraduate library in the second quadrangle since 1865, known as the Meyricke Library from 1882 onwards.

The Old Members' Building, which contains a music room, 24 study-bedrooms and some lecture rooms, was built between 1969 and 1971. It was built after a fundraising appeal to Old Members to mark the college's quatercentenary, and was opened by the Prince of Wales in 1971. The Fellows' Garden is between the Old Members' Building and the rear of the rooms on the west side of the second quadrangle. In 2002, a two-year project to rebuild the property above the college-owned shops on Ship Street was completed. As part of the work, the bottom floor was converted from rooms occupied by students and fellows into a new Junior Common Room (JCR), to replace the common room in the second quadrangle, which was by then too small to cope with the increased numbers of students.

=== Fourth quadrangle ===
In 2019, work began on redevelopment of a commercial property, Northgate House, owned by the college on the corner of Cornmarket and Market Streets, to provide new student accommodation above retail facilities with a new quad and other teaching facilities behind, projected for completion to mark the college's 450th anniversary in 2021. The new building is named the Cheng Yu-tung building after the late billionaire entrepreneur and philanthropist Cheng Yu-tung whose family provided the principal donation for the project.

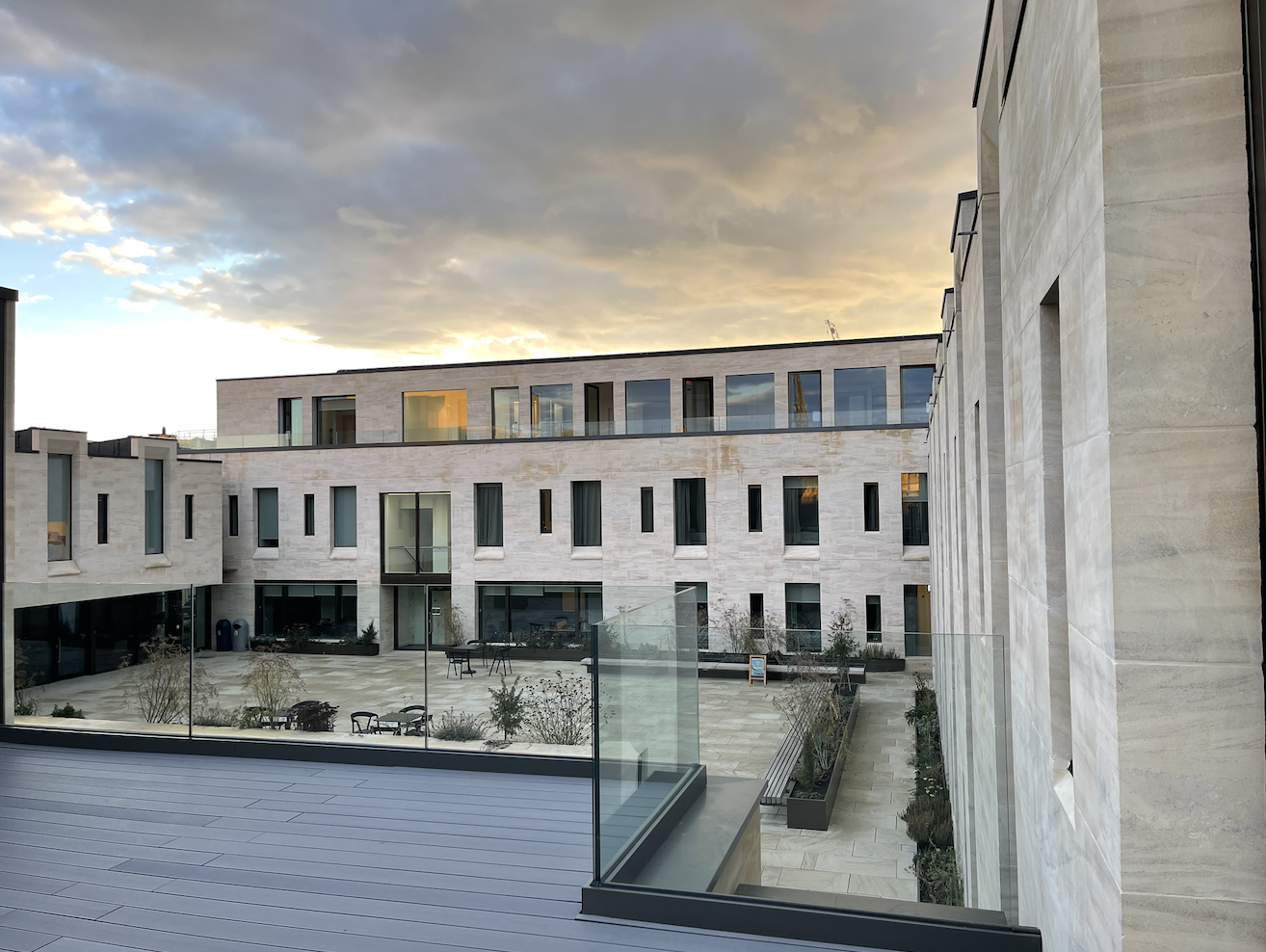
View of the fourth quadrangle: the Cheng Yu Tung building at Jesus College Oxford, completed in 2021.

=== Other buildings ===
The college purchased 10 acres (0.040 km^{2}; 0.016 sq mi) of land in east Oxford (near the Cowley Road) in 1903 for use as a sports ground. Residential accommodation was first built at the sports ground in 1967 (Thelwall House, rebuilt in 1998), with additions between 1988 and 1990 (Hugh Price House and Leoline Jenkins House). A further development, known as Hazel Court (after Alfred Hazel, principal 1925–1944), was built in 2000, bringing the total number of students who can be housed at the sports ground to 135.

Donations from Edwin Stevens, an Old Member of the college, enabled the construction in 1974 of student flats at a site in north Oxford on the Woodstock Road, named "Stevens Close" in his honour.

The college also owns a number of houses on Ship Street, which are used for student accommodation. It purchased a further site in Ship Street at a cost of £1.8M, which was converted at a projected cost of £5.5M to provide 31 student rooms with en-suite facilities, a 100-seat lecture theatre and other teaching rooms. The Ship Street Centre was officially opened by the Chancellor of the University of Oxford, Chris Patten, on 25 September 2010.

== People associated with the college ==
=== Principals and Fellows ===
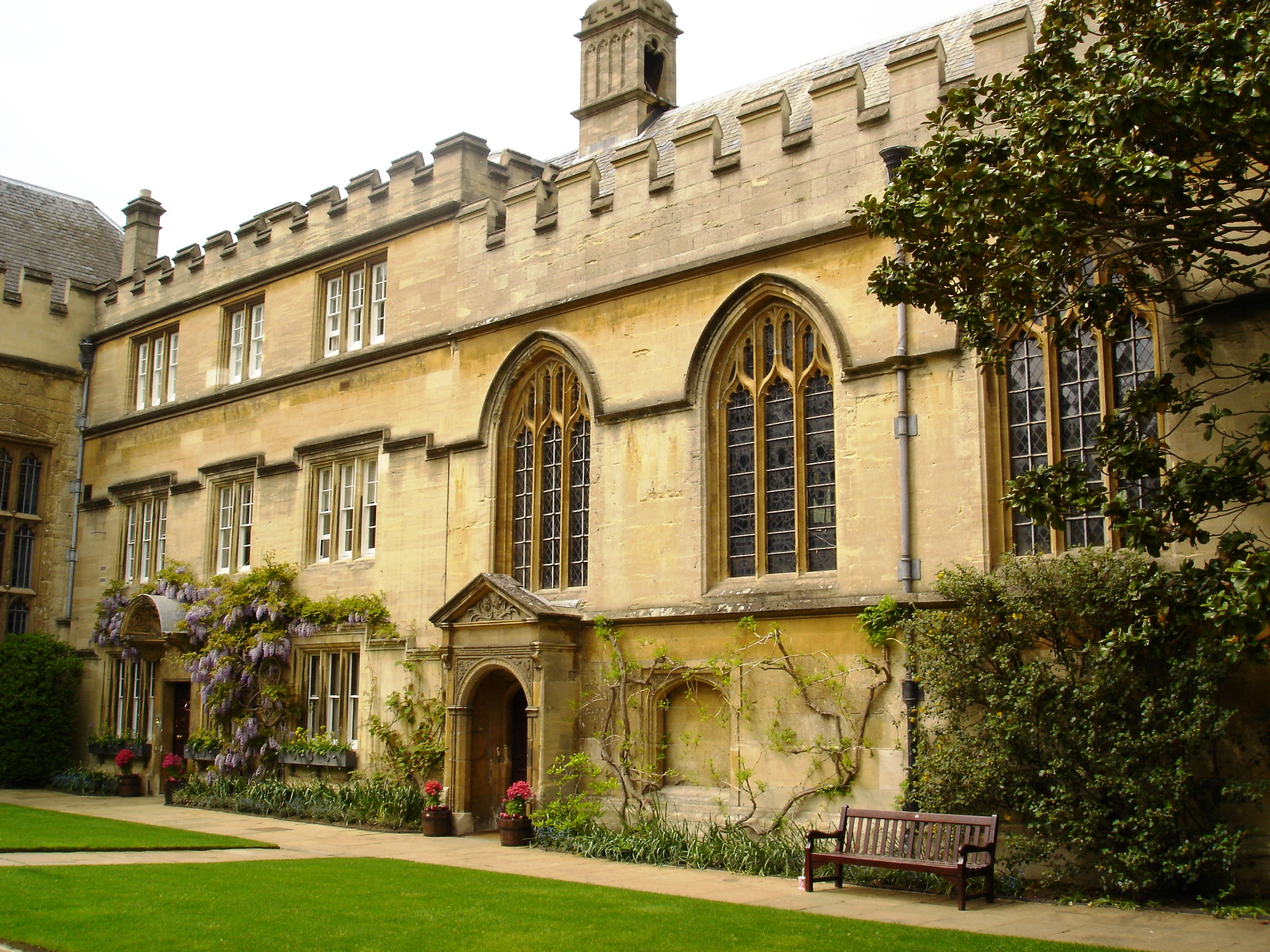
The Principal's Lodgings (left) and the chapel (right) are located within the First Quad of Jesus College.

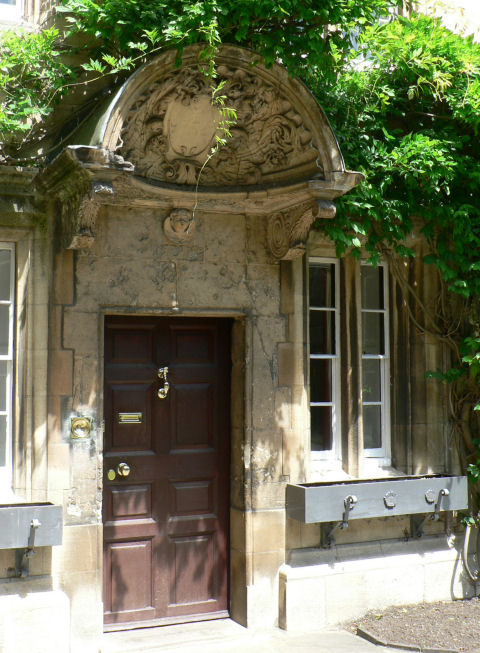
Front door of the principal's lodgings, showing the shell-hood of c.1700

The college is run by the Principal and Fellows. The Principal must be "a person distinguished for literary or scientific attainments, or for services in the work of education in the University or elsewhere". The Principal has "pre-eminence and authority over all members of the College and all persons connected therewith" and exercises "a general superintendence in all matters relating to education and discipline". The former Principal, Sir Nigel Shadbolt, was appointed in 2015. He was succeeded by Lindsay Skoll, the first ever female Principal of the college, in August 2026. Fourteen Principals have been former students of the college: Griffith Powell (elected in 1613) was the first and Alfred Hazel (elected in 1925) was the most recent. The longest-serving principal was Henry Foulkes, from 1817 to 1857.

When the college was founded in 1571, the first charter installed David Lewis as Principal and named eight others as the first Fellows of the college. The statutes of 1622 allowed for 16 Fellows. There is now no limit on the number of Fellowships that the Governing Body can create. The college statutes provide for various categories of Fellows. Professorial Fellows are those Professors and Readers of the university who are allocated to the college by the university. One of these professorships is the Jesus Professor of Celtic, which is the only chair in Celtic Studies at an English university. Celtic scholars such as Sir John Rhys and Ellis Evans have held the position since its creation in 1877. The chair is currently held by David Willis, who took up the position in 2020 after the previous holder Thomas Charles-Edwards retired in 2011. The zoologists Charles Godfray and Paul Harvey are both Professorial Fellows. Official Fellows are those who hold tutorial or administrative appointments in the college. Past Official Fellows include the composer and musicologist John Caldwell, the historians Sir Goronwy Edwards and Niall Ferguson, the philosopher Galen Strawson and the political philosopher John Gray. There are also Senior and Junior Research Fellows. Principals and Fellows who retire can be elected as Emeritus Fellows.

A further category is that of Welsh Supernumerary Fellows, who are, in rotation, the Vice-Chancellors of Cardiff University, Swansea University, Lampeter University, Aberystwyth University, Bangor University and the University of Wales College of Medicine. There is one Welsh Supernumerary Fellow at a time, holding the position for not longer than three years. The first of these was John Viriamu Jones in 1897.

The college formerly had a category of missionary Fellows, known as Leoline Fellows after their founder, Leoline Jenkins (a former principal). In his will in 1685, he stated that "It is but too obvious that the persons in Holy Orders employed in his Majesty's fleet at sea and foreign plantations are too few." To address this, he established two Fellowships at Jesus College, whose holders should serve as clergy "in any of his Majesty's fleets or in his Majesty's plantations" under the direction of the Lord High Admiral and the Bishop of London respectively. The last of these, Frederick de Winton, was appointed in 1876 and held his Fellowship until his death in 1932. This category was abolished in 1877 by the Oxford and Cambridge Universities Commission, without prejudice to the rights of existing holders such as de Winton. Another category of Fellowship that was abolished in the 19th century was that of the King Charles I Fellows, founded by King Charles in 1636 and tenable by natives of the Channel Islands in an attempt by him to "reclaim the Channel Islands from the extreme Calvinism which characterised them." The first such Fellow was Daniel Brevint.

=== Honorary Fellows ===
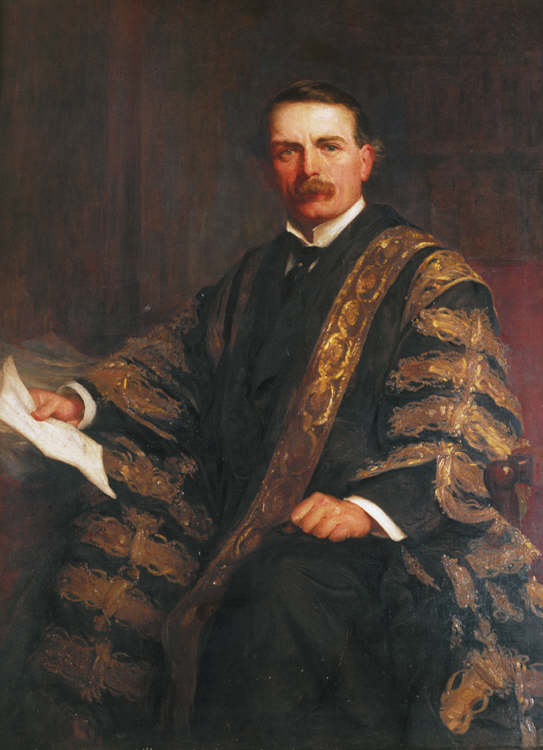
David Lloyd George, pictured in 1911, was elected an Honorary Fellow of the college in 1910 and said that he would prize no honour more highly.

The Governing Body has the ability to elect "distinguished persons" to Honorary Fellowships. Under the current statutes of the college, Honorary Fellows cannot vote at meetings of the Governing Body and do not receive financial reward. They can be called upon, however, to help decide whether to dismiss or discipline members of academic staff (including the Principal).

Three former principals of the college (John Christie, Sir John Habakkuk and Sir Peter North) have been elected Honorary Fellows on retirement. Some Honorary Fellows were formerly Fellows of the college, others were Old Members of the college, and some were in both categories. Others had no previous academic connection with the college before their election. Some of these were distinguished Welshmen – for example, the Welsh businessman Sir Alfred Jones was elected in 1902 and the Welsh judge Sir Samuel Evans, President of the Probate, Divorce and Admiralty Division of the High Court, was elected in 1918. The Welsh politician David Lloyd George was elected to an Honorary Fellowship in 1910 when he was Chancellor of the Exchequer. He wrote to Sir John Rhys, the Principal at the time, to thank the college for the honour, saying:

I wish to express to you and to the Fellows of Jesus College my deep sense of the great honour which you have done me in electing me to be one of your body. It is a very special gratification to me to be associated in this intimate way with Jesus College. As a Welshman, I have watched with pleasure and pride the prosperity, especially since you have been Principal, of the college which is so closely connected with our country, little thinking ever to find myself a member of it; and I can honestly say that no honour can fall to my lot which I shall prize more highly than this Fellowship which you have conferred upon me. Please accept and express to the Fellows of the college my hearty and sincere thanks. Ever yours sincerely, D. LLOYD GEORGE.

The first three Honorary Fellows, all former students of the college, were elected in October 1877: John Rhys, the first Jesus Professor of Celtic (later an Official Fellow (1881–1895) and Principal (1895–1915)); the historian John Richard Green; and the poet Lewis Morris. The college noted in 1998 that the number of Honorary Fellows of the college was markedly below the average of other Oxford colleges and it adopted a more methodical approach to increase numbers. Seven Honorary Fellows were elected that year, followed by another five in 1999. The college's Honorary Fellows have included two Old Members who later became Prime Minister of their respective countries: Norman Washington Manley, who studied at Jesus College as a Rhodes Scholar and who was Chief Minister of Jamaica from 1955 to 1962, and Harold Wilson, who was twice British Prime Minister (1964–1970 and 1974–1976). The first female honorary fellow was the journalist and broadcaster Francine Stock.

=== Alumni ===
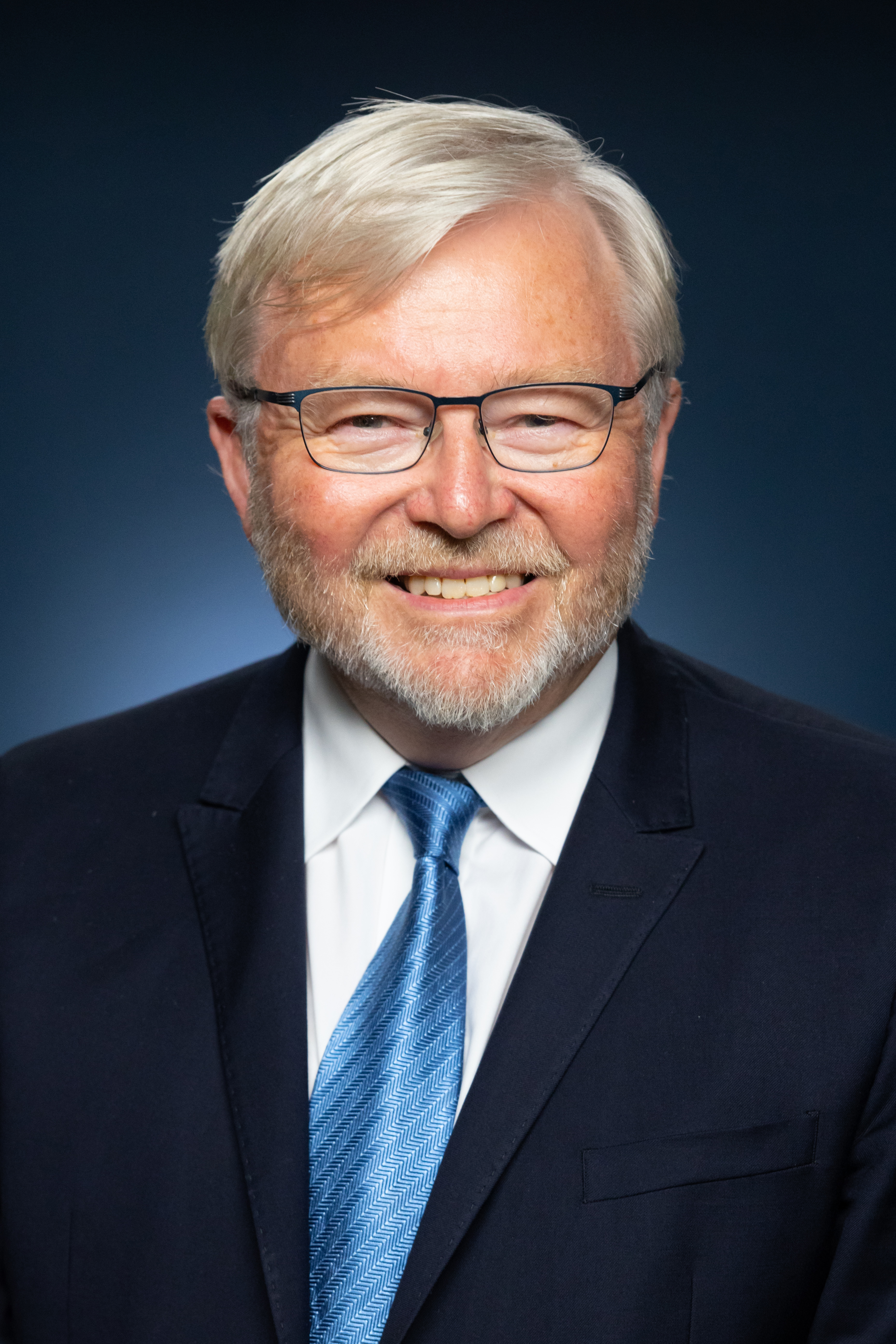
Kevin Rudd, who was Prime Minister of Australia, completed his DPhil at Jesus College Oxford

Notable former students of the college have included politicians, scientists, writers, entertainers and academics. T. E. Lawrence ("Lawrence of Arabia"), known for his part in the Arab Revolt of 1916–1918 and for his writings including Seven Pillars of Wisdom, studied history at the college. His thesis on Crusader castles (the fieldwork for which marked the beginning of his fascination with the Middle East) is held in the Fellows' Library. Other former students include Harold Wilson, who was Prime Minister of the United Kingdom from 1964 to 1970 and 1974–1976, Kevin Rudd who was Prime Minister of Australia, Norman Washington Manley who was Prime Minister of Jamaica, Pixley ka Isaka Seme (a founder and president of the African National Congress), Sir William Williams (Speaker of the House of Commons 1680–1685), Lord Sankey (Lord Chancellor 1929–1935), Delyth Jewell (Welsh Deputy Minister 2026–present). Members of Parliament from the three main political parties in the United Kingdom have attended the college, as have politicians from Australia (Neal Blewett), New Zealand (Harold Rushworth), Sri Lanka (Lalith Athulathmudali) and the United States (Heather Wilson).

The founders' hopes that their college would produce prominent Welsh clergy were fulfilled in no small measure when a former student, A. G. Edwards, was elected the first Archbishop of Wales when the Church in Wales was disestablished in 1920. Two later Archbishops of Wales, Glyn Simon (Archbishop from 1968 to 1971) and Gwilym Owen Williams (Archbishop 1971–1982) were also educated at the college. Celticists associated with the college include Sir John Rhys, Sir John Morris-Jones, and Sir Thomas (T. H.) Parry-Williams, whilst the list of historians includes the college's first graduate, David Powel, who published the first printed history of Wales in 1584, the Victorian historian J. R. Green, and the historian Richard J. Evans. Angus Buchanan won the Victoria Cross during the First World War. Record-breaking quadriplegic solo sailor Hilary Lister was also a student here, whilst from the field of arts and entertainment there are names such as Elwyn Brook-Jones, actor, (1911–1962), Magnus Magnusson, presenter of Mastermind, the National Poet of Wales Gwyn Thomas, and television weather presenters Kirsty McCabe and Siân Lloyd. Nigel Hitchin, the Savilian Professor of Geometry at Oxford since 1997, studied at the college, as did Edward Hinds (a physicist who won the Rumford Medal in 2008), Chris Rapley (director of the Science Museum), and the zoologists Edward Bagnall Poulton and James Brontë Gatenby.

== Student life ==
There are about 325 undergraduates and 150 postgraduates. About half of the undergraduates studied at state schools before coming to Oxford, and about 10% are from overseas. Students from the college participate in a variety of extracurricular activities. Some contribute to student journalism for Cherwell or The Oxford Student. The Turl Street Arts Festival (a week-long student-organised event) is held annually in conjunction with the two other colleges on Turl Street, Exeter and Lincoln colleges. The festival, which takes place in Fifth Week of Hilary term, includes exhibitions, plays and concerts. Although the college does not award choral scholarships, the chapel choir is well-attended by college members and others. The choir is non-auditioning for college members, and is run by one or more undergraduate organ scholars.

Every three years, the college co-organises the Somerville-Jesus Ball on the grounds of Somerville College. The last ball was held in May 2025.

=== Sports ===
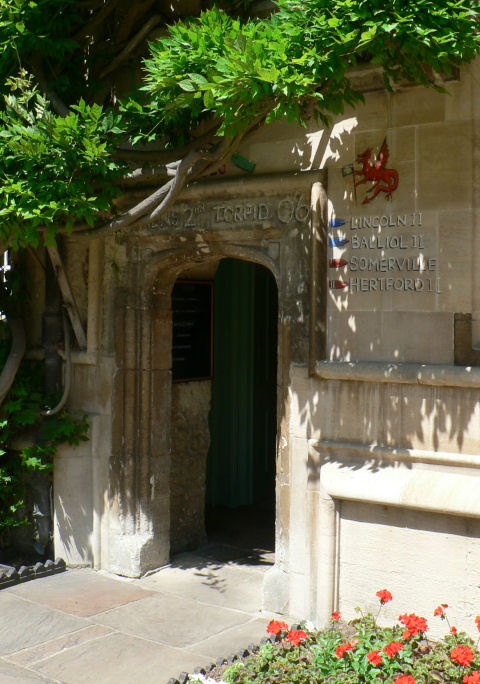
Doorway of staircase XII – chalk markings celebrate the success of the men's 2nd VIII in Torpids 2006

In common with many Oxford colleges, Jesus provides sporting facilities for students, including playing fields at a site in east Oxford off the Cowley Road known as Bartlemas (for its proximity to St Bartholomew's Chapel). Football, rugby, netball, field hockey, cricket, and tennis can be played there. Squash courts are at a separate city-centre site on St Cross Road. The college also provides students with membership of the university's gym and swimming pool on Iffley Road.

Jesus College Boat Club (commonly abbreviated to JCBC) is the rowing club for members of the college. The club was formed in 1835, but rowing at the college predates the foundation of the club: a boat from the college was involved in the earliest recorded races between college crews at Oxford in 1815, when it competed against a crew from Brasenose College. These may have been the only two colleges who had boats racing at that time, and the Brasenose boat was usually victorious. Neither the men's nor the women's 1st VIIIs have been "Head of the River" during Eights Week, the main college races, but the women's 1st VIII was Head of the River in the spring races, Torpids, between 1980 and 1983. Jesus boats have also had other successful seasons: the 1896 Jesus College boat had a reputation of being one of the faster boats in the university, and the women's 1st VIII of 1993 won their "blades" in the first divisions of both Torpids and Eights Week, an achievement that led to the crew being described in the Jesus College Record as vying "not just for the College team of the decade, but perhaps for the team of the last three decades", in any sport.

A number of college members have rowed for the university against Cambridge University in the Boat Race and the Women's Boat Race. Barney Williams, a Canadian rower who studied at the college, won a silver medal in rowing at the 2004 Summer Olympics, and participated in the Boat Race in 2005 and 2006. Other students who rowed while at the college have achieved success in other fields, including John Sankey, who became Lord Chancellor, Alwyn Williams, who became Bishop of Durham, and Maurice Jones, who became Principal of St David's College, Lampeter. Another college rower, James Page, was appointed Secretary of the Amateur Rowing Association and coached both the Oxford and Cambridge University boat clubs.

The college boathouse, which is shared with the boat club of Keble College, is in Christ Church Meadow, on the Isis (as the River Thames is called in Oxford). It dates from 1964 and replaced a moored barge used by spectators and crew-members. The last college barge had been purchased from one of the Livery Companies of the City of London in 1911. It is now a floating restaurant further down the Thames at Richmond, and for some years was painted in the college scarf of green and white.

=== Welsh connection ===
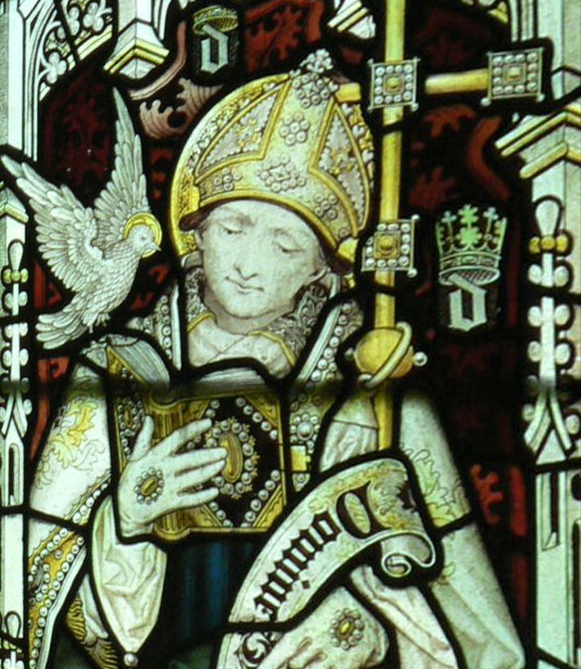
Late 19th-century stained glass in the chapel, showing Saint David, the patron saint of Wales

Education in Wales had been stimulated by the foundation of schools during the reigns of Henry VIII and Edward VI: King Henry VIII Grammar School in Abergavenny 1542 and Christ College, Brecon 1541 were established in the 1540s, and Friars School, Bangor dates from 1557. However, despite the numbers of Welsh students coming to Oxford University as a result, there was no special provision for Welshmen before 1571. Despite the links with Wales that Hugh Price and many of the founding Fellows had, neither the 1571 charter nor any of the later charters limited entry to the college to Welshmen. Nevertheless, the college students were predominantly Welsh from the outset, and the college became "the pinnacle of the academic ambition of the young men of Wales". Many of the fellows in the past were Welsh, since when new fellowships were created by benefactions (often by people of Welsh descent) there was frequently a stipulation that the recipients would be related to the donor or come from a specified part of Wales. These specific limitations were removed as part of reforms of Oxford University during the 19th century. Between 1571 and 1915, only one Principal (Francis Howell, 1657–1660) was not from Wales or of Welsh descent.

Jesus still has a particular association with Wales and is often referred to as "the Welsh college". The college is home to the university's Professor of Celtic, and a specialist Celtic library in addition to the college's normal library. Meyrick scholarships, from the bequest of Edmund Meyrick in 1713, are awarded for academic merit where the student is a native of Wales (or the child of a native of Wales), able to speak Welsh or was educated for the last three years of secondary school in Wales.

The college's undergraduate gossip sheet is entitled The Sheepshagger in allusion to an offensive joke about Welsh people's supposed penchant for sheep. Furthermore, the Welshness of the college is self-perpetuating, as Welsh students will often apply to Jesus because it is seen as the Welsh college. Old members recall the college having a majority of Welsh members until well into the 20th century; today, however, around 15% of undergraduates come from Wales. For comparison, residents of Wales comprise just under 5% of the United Kingdom population (2.9 million out of a total of 58.8 million at the time of the 2001 Census).

In modern times, the Welsh roots of the college come to the fore most prominently on Saint David's Day. The feast is marked by a choral Evensong in the chapel, decorated for the occasion with daffodils. The service, including music, is conducted entirely in Welsh (despite only a small minority of the choir usually being native speakers of the language). It is generally well attended by members of the Welsh community in Oxford. The college's annual St. David's Day Dinner traditionally culminates with the serving of Sir Watkin Williams-Wynn's Pudding. The name recalls the Welsh politician and prominent Jacobite who attended the college early in the 18th century.

The Welsh connection is also evident in the college's outreach activities, such as organising a summer school for Welsh students in partnership with the Welsh Government's Seren Network.

== Library and archives ==
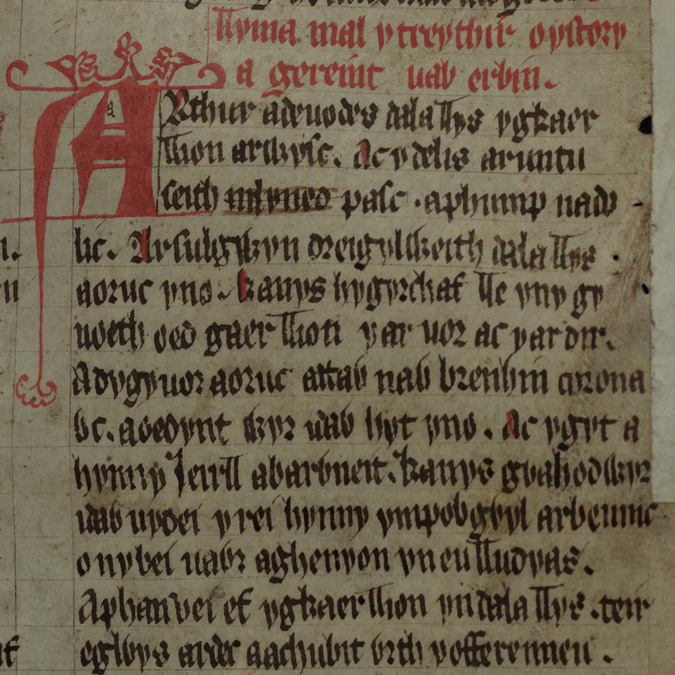
Opening lines of one of the Mabinogion tales from the Red Book of Hergest (written pre-13c, incorporating pre-Roman myths of Celtic gods): Gereint vab Erbin. Arthur a deuodes dala llys yg Caerllion ar Wysc... (Geraint the son of Erbin. Arthur was accustomed to hold his Court at Caerlleon upon Usk...)

The main library at Jesus College is the Meyricke Library; older printed books are housed in the historic Fellows' Library. The medieval manuscripts should be directed to re held at the Bodleian Libraries, where they are on deposit. The archives hold the administrative documents of the college since its foundation, as well as a large collection of documents, photographs, and printed papers. There is also an extensive Celtic Library. In 2021, the College Librarian was Owen McKnight.

Medieval and early modern manuscripts owned at Jesus College date back to the 11th century and since 1886 have been deposited at the Bodleian Libraries. Some of the most important Welsh language manuscripts are at Jesus College, including the Red Book of Hergest (1285–1320). Modern manuscripts include T.E. Lawrence's undergraduate thesis (MS. 181).

== Silverware ==
The college's collection of silverware includes a silver-gilt punch bowl, presented by Sir Watkin Williams-Wynn in 1732. The bowl, which weighs more than 200 ounces (5.7 kg) and holds 10 imperial gallons (45 L), was used at a dinner held in the Radcliffe Camera in 1814, to celebrate what was supposed to be the final defeat of Napoleon. Those present at the dinner included the Tsar, the King of Prussia, Blücher, Metternich, the Prince Regent, the Duke of York, and the Duke of Wellington. There is a college tradition that the bowl will be presented to anyone who can meet two challenges. The first is to put arms around the bowl at its widest point; the second is to drain the bowl of strong punch. The bowl measures 5 feet 2 inches (1.57 m) at its widest point, and so the first challenge has only been accomplished rarely; the second challenge has not been met.

== Coat of arms ==
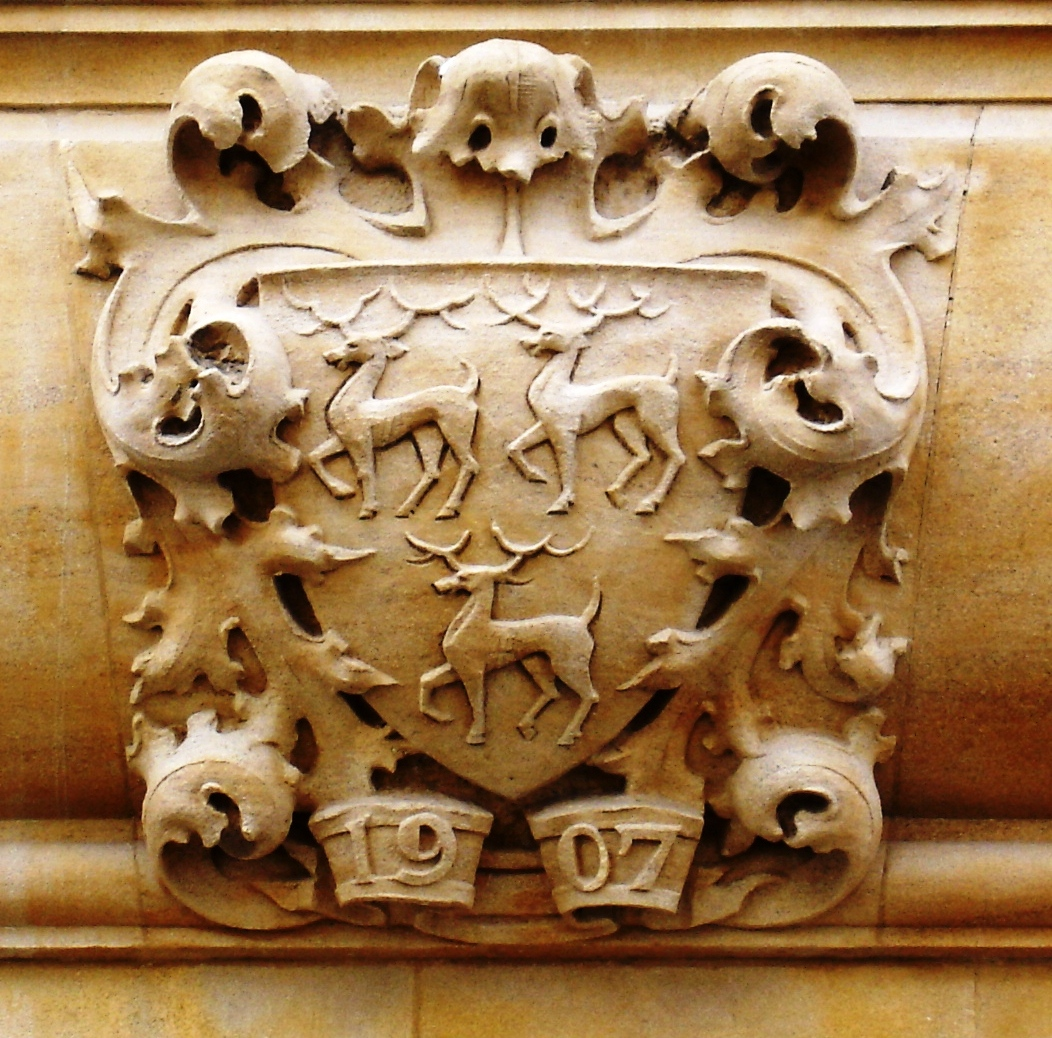
The college crest above the Ship Street entrance gate.

The college's coat of arms, in heraldic terminology, is Vert, three stags trippant argent attired or. The arms are not those of Hugh Price. His arms, according to their depiction in the margins of his will, were gules (red) a chevron ermine between three fleurs-des-lis. The arms were not granted or authorised by the College of Arms, but the length of time for which they have been used has given them a prescriptive authority. The earliest depiction of the arms was thought to be about 1590, in a document held by the College of Arms, which refers to the stags appearing on a blue (in heraldic terms, azure) background but subsequent examination of this document by Peter Donoghue, Bluemantle Pursuivant shows that the arms were added c.1680. The first known appearance of the arms is therefore on John Speed's Map of Oxfordshire in 1605 with a blue field. The green field made its appearance by 1619 in an armorial quarry painted by one of the Van Linge brothers. The green background became generally (but not universally) used by the 1730s, still appearing as horizontal hatchings indicating azure were in use on bookplates for the college library as late as 1761.

There are similarities with the arms of Lincoln College, Oxford, where one of the elements consists of three golden stags statant (standing still); this was derived from the coat of arms of Lincoln's so-called "second founder", Thomas Rotherham. It was once claimed that Jesus had stolen the stags from Lincoln, but the counter-argument (from an antiquarian with close Lincoln connections) was that the origins of each were distinct. One suggestion (by Paul Langford, the Rector of Lincoln College) is that Jesus College continued the arms adopted by a theological college founded by Rotherham in his home town – Jesus College, Rotherham – which had been suppressed in the time of Edward VI.

The arms of Maud Green, Lady Parr, mother of Catherine Parr (the last of the six wives of Henry VIII and stepmother to Elizabeth I), were of three stags on an azure background, and this became one of the elements of the arms of Catherine Parr on her marriage. Her sister, Anne Parr, married William, 1st Earl of Pembroke, whose grandson (the 3rd Earl, also called William) became the first Visitor of the college in 1622. Maud Green's arms are depicted in plasterwork from about 1592 at Powis Castle, owned by a kinsman of the earls. One writer has suggested that the college may have adopted the arms in order to be associated with one of the leading Welsh families of the day.

This latter theory is not heraldically tenable as the quarters in an achievement after the first and pronominal quarter brought into the family by marriage to heraldic heiresses cannot meaningfully exist on their own to represent the person who now quarters them. It is more probable then that the arms of the college really are those of Archbishop Rotherham and were assumed to be those of the college by John Speed who saw them on one of its buildings in 1605 when preparing his map. Lawrence Hall in Ship Street was given to Rotherham in 1476 and leased to Jesus in 1572. It may well have displayed the Archbishop's arms in its structure as did the building on the south side of the front quad of Lincoln which he completed. These arms for Jesus College could not be confused with those of Lincoln as that college, since 1574, already had a complex tripartite coat granted to it by Richard Lee, Portcullis Pursuivant, in which the colour of the stags in the centre section had been changed to Or (gold) and their attitude to statant.
