= Ducker & Son =

Shoe shop in Oxford, England

Coordinates: 51°45′13.0″N 1°15′23.1″W

- Type: limited
- Founded: 1898
- Founder: Edward Ducker
- Defunct: November 2016
- Fate: Closed
- Headquarters: Oxford

Inside the premises in 2006

Ducker & Son was a traditional shoe makers in Turl Street in Oxford. The business was founded by Edward Ducker in 1898. A limited company was formed following the deaths of Ducker and his wife in 1947.

The shop was featured in the 2007 film Atonement. Ducker & Son closed at the end of November 2016. Its archives are now held in the Bodleian Library.

== Customers ==
Customers included:

- H. H. Asquith - Prime Minister
- Rowan Atkinson - English actor and comedian known for Mr. Bean and Blackadder.
- Jeremy Clarkson - English broadcaster and writer known for BBC TV show Top Gear.
- John le Carré - Irish/British author who wrote under the pen name John le Carré.
- Eddie Jordan - Irish businessman and former Formula One team boss.
- Lady Ottoline Morrell - Literary salonist
- Matthew Pinsent - English Olympic rower and broadcaster.
- J.R.R. Tolkien - English writer and Oxford don known for The Hobbit and The Lord of the Rings.
- Evelyn Waugh - English writer known for Brideshead Revisited.

== Local legend ==
A local legend, mentioned by Jan Morris in Oxford (1965), tells of an old basketwork armchair reported to materialise in a room above the shop for a few seconds and then gradually fade away. Yurdan, however, states that it has been a long time since reports of any sightings have been made.
