= Turl Street =

Street in central Oxford, England

Coordinates: 51.75375°N 1.25642°W

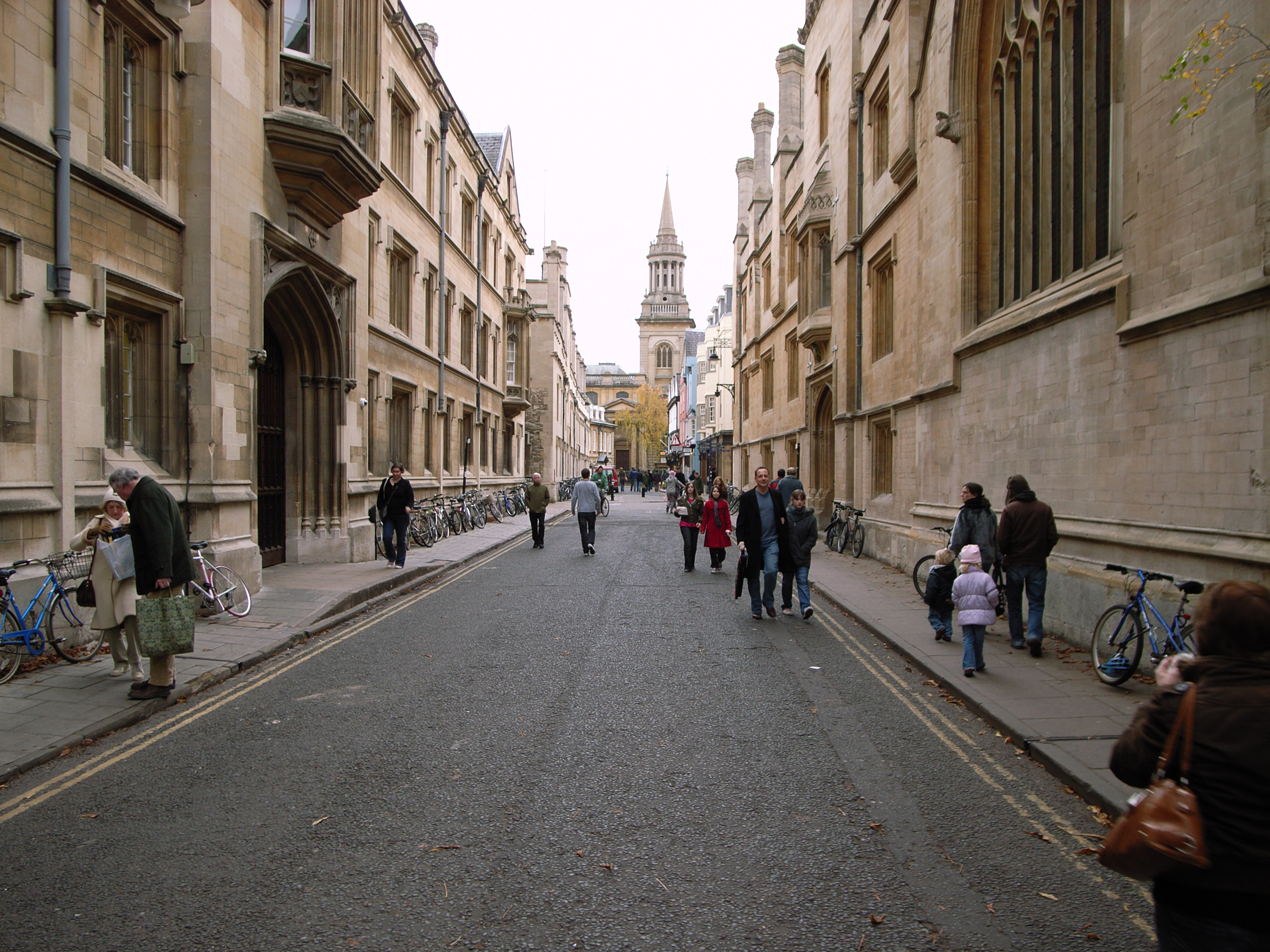
View south from the north end of Turl Street with Exeter College on the left and Jesus College on the right.

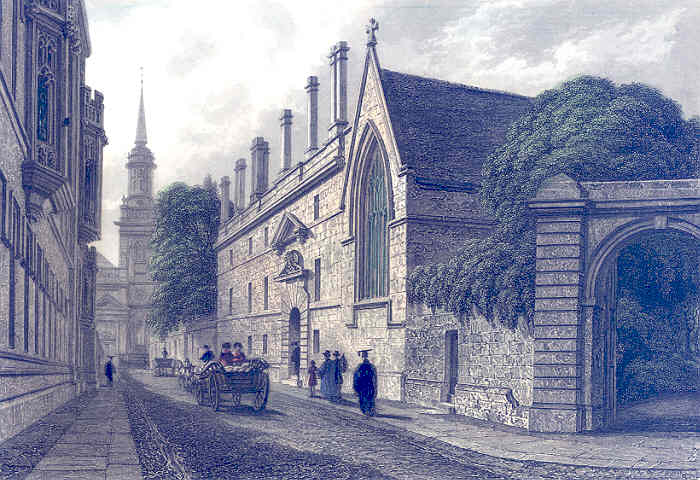
Engraving of Turl Street, with Jesus College on the right, in 1837.

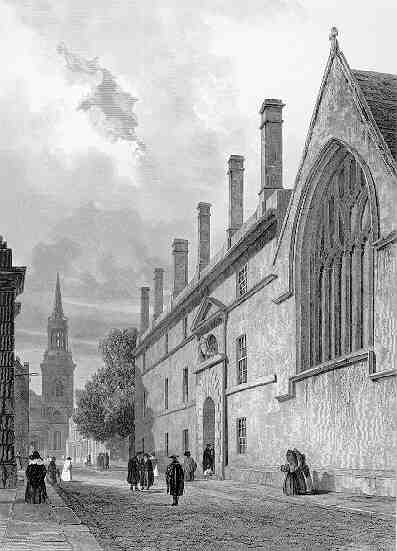
Engraving looking south along Turl Street, with All Saints Church in the distance, 1839.

Turl Street is a historic street in central Oxford, England.

== Location ==
The street is located in the city centre, linking Broad Street at the north and High Street at the south. It intersects with Brasenose Lane to the east, and Market Street and Ship Street to the west. These streets link Turl Street to the busy Cornmarket, and to the iconic Radcliffe Square.

It is colloquially known as The Turl and is home to three of the University of Oxford's historic colleges: Exeter, Lincoln and Jesus. It meets the High Street by the early 18th century All Saints church, which has been Lincoln College's library since the 1970s.

== History ==
Turl Street was called St Mildred's Street in 1363, but was known as Turl Gate Street by the mid-17th century. It acquired this name from a twirling gate (demolished in 1722) which was in a postern in the Oxford city wall. The part to the south of Ship Street was known as Lincoln College Lane in 1751.

Originally the Turl came to an abrupt halt at its junction with Ship Street, where it reached the city wall and the twirling gate. By 1551, it was extended by a path (known as "The path leading from the Hole in the Wall") to reach what is now Broad Street, and in 1722 the gate was removed altogether.

The Turl has been closed to traffic (except for access) since 1985. A rising bollard, installed by the Oxford City Council, cuts it off in the middle.

== Commerce ==
As well as the three Turl Street colleges, the street houses several shops, including an Oxfam bookshop, one jewellery shop, a café, a stationery shop (Scriptum Fine Stationery), a whisky shop, a wine shop and the traditional gentleman's tailors, Walters of Oxford.

From about 1900 to 2016 No.6 was the sole retail outlet shop of bespoke handmade shoemakers Ducker and Son. Ducker's ladies department operated from No.13 in post-war years. Duckers shoes were posted to customers worldwide, having been made on personal foot lasts.

16 Turl Street was the site of one of the first Indian restaurants in England outside London, opened in 1937 by an Indian-born law student; Bir Bahadur, who having established an Indian restaurant in London (The Kohinoor in Roper Street), moved to Oxford and opened his second. The exotic decorations of the restaurant were recalled by Kenneth Tynan, who was a regular diner, in his diaries The Taj Mahal closed in 1992.

The building then went on to be a number of different restaurants, before becoming the QI Building ("QI Oxford") (associated with the Quite Interesting television series), a private members club, in the autumn of 2004. In May 2007 the building was purchased by Curious Group, who enlarged the venue to include a former Millets shop next door at no. 17 and renamed it Corner Club. Corner Club closed in December 2009 after failing to agree a new lease with the building owner; Oxford City Council.

From 2011 to 2020, 16-17 was occupied by the Hub, a centre for Oxford student volunteers, and the Turl Street Kitchen. The Hub also operated Tower House Guest Rooms, a bed and breakfast with 8 rooms. Profits from both enterprises funded the Hub. Turl Street Kitchen closed during the pandemic and the Hub relocated to Little Clarendon Street

The Turl Street colleges also have student housing above and around many of these shops.

== Miscellaneous ==
Turl Street is the subject of an obscure ecclesiastical joke, based on its location. "How is the Church of England like Turl Street? It runs from the High to the Broad and it bypasses Jesus."

2018 TSAF logo

The Turl Street Arts Festival is an annual festival held in February, organised by students from the three colleges in the street: Exeter, Jesus and Lincoln. Taking place during the fifth week of the university's Hilary term, it has been running since 1997. Though other Oxford colleges host annual arts weeks, the festival is the largest such event at the university. Although events are hosted within the three Turl Street colleges, any student of the university can attend the festival's events.

The week varies from more formal events such as choral recitals to open mic nights and several plays. An arts fair is often hosted on Brasenose Lane. The week traditionally ends with a Sunday Choral Evensong led by the combined choirs of the three colleges. A student magazine named The Turl is frequently produced in conjunction with the festival, edited by members of the committee and featuring contributions from across the university.

== Gallery ==
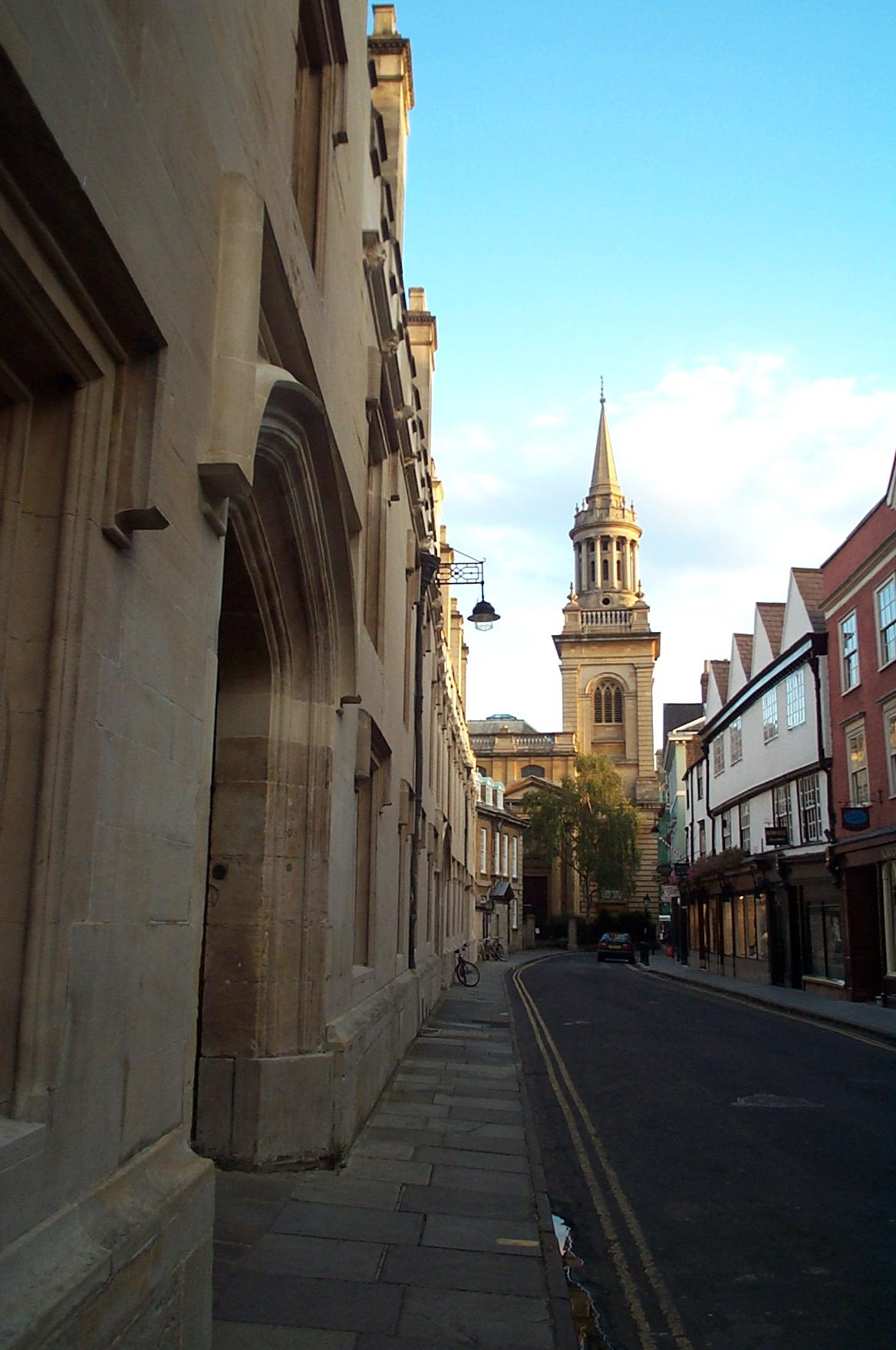
Looking south along Turl Street towards All Saints with Lincoln College on the left.

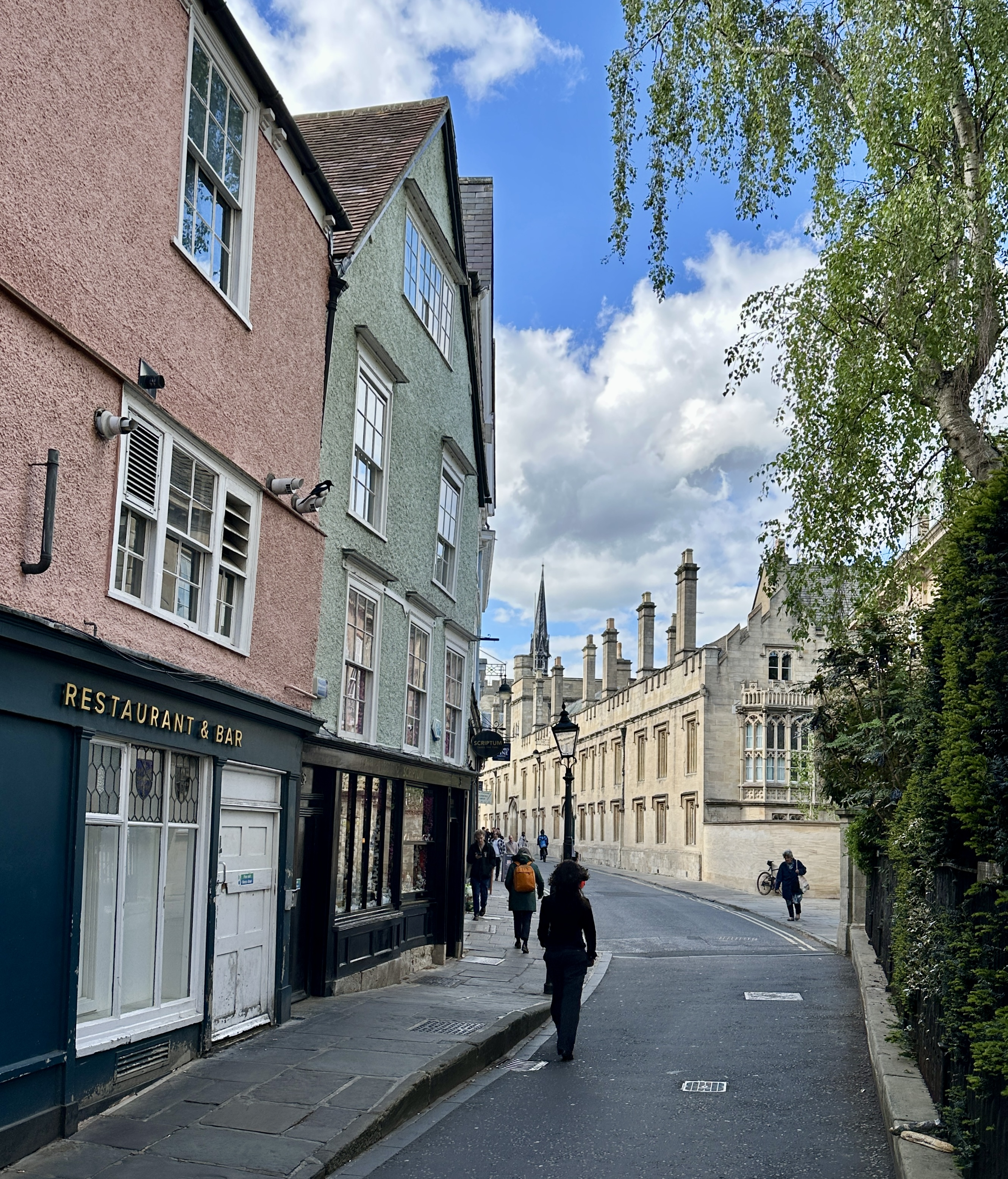
View north from the southern end of Turl Street

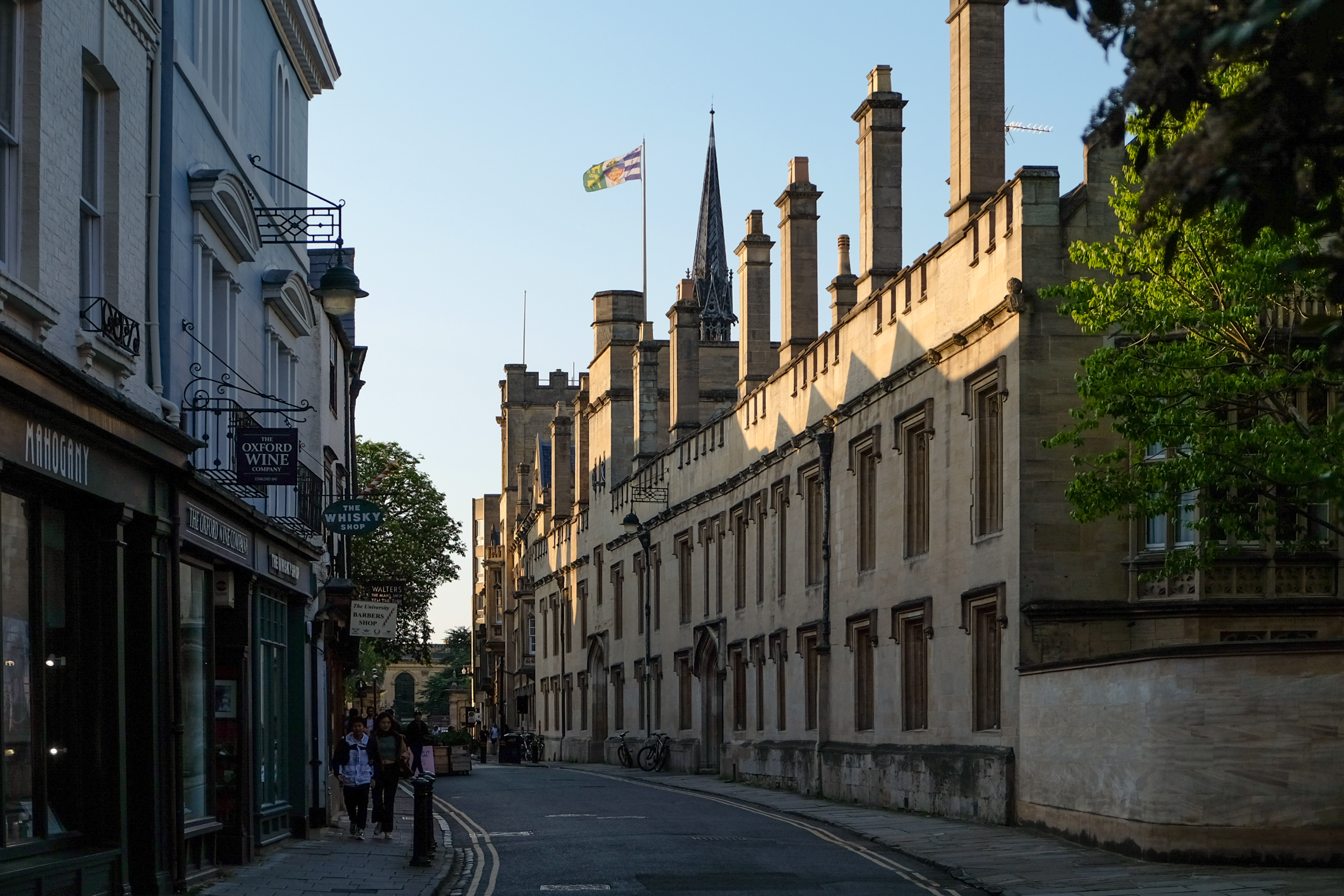
View north from the south end of Turl Street with exterior of Lincoln College on the right.

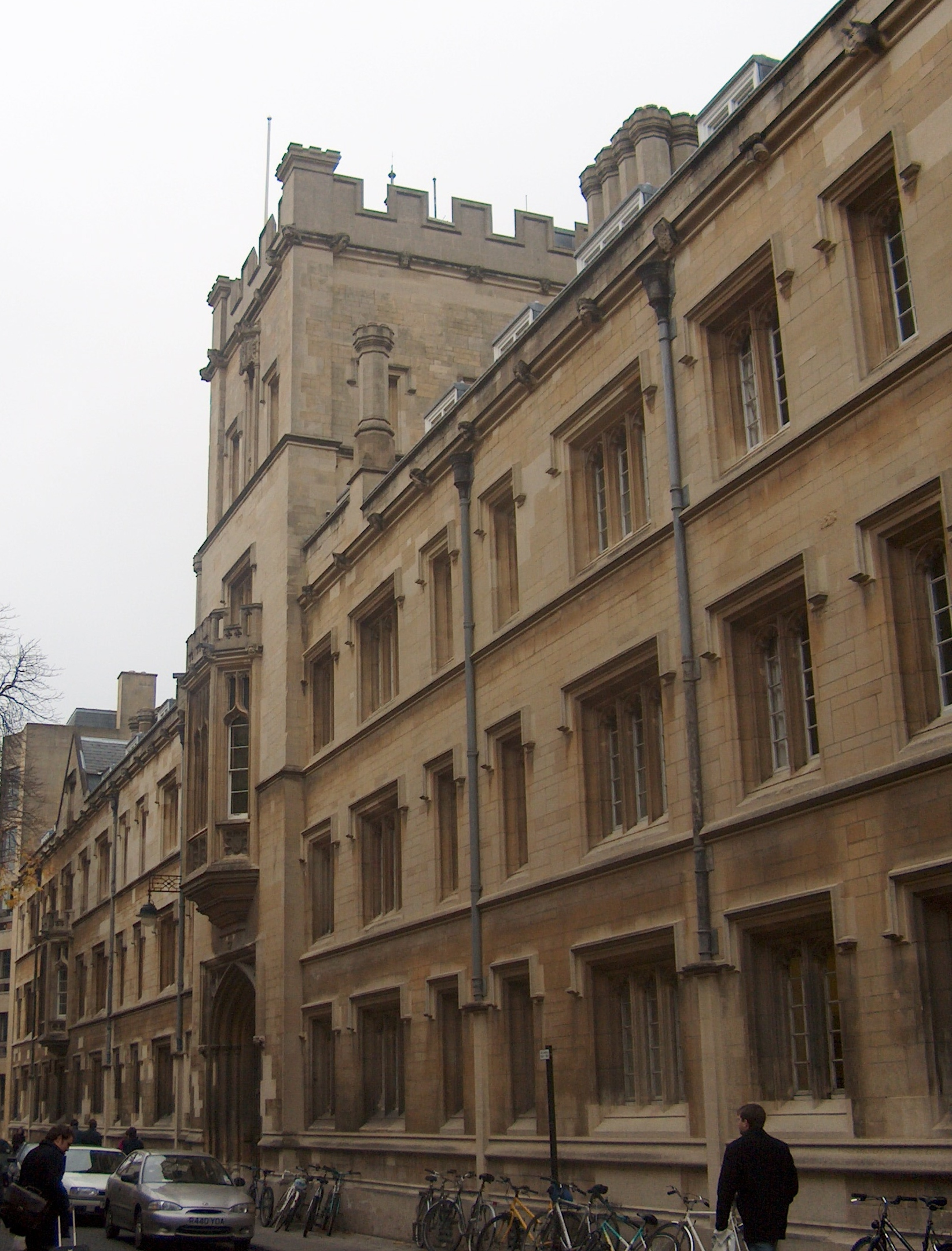
View of Exeter College, looking north along Turl Street.

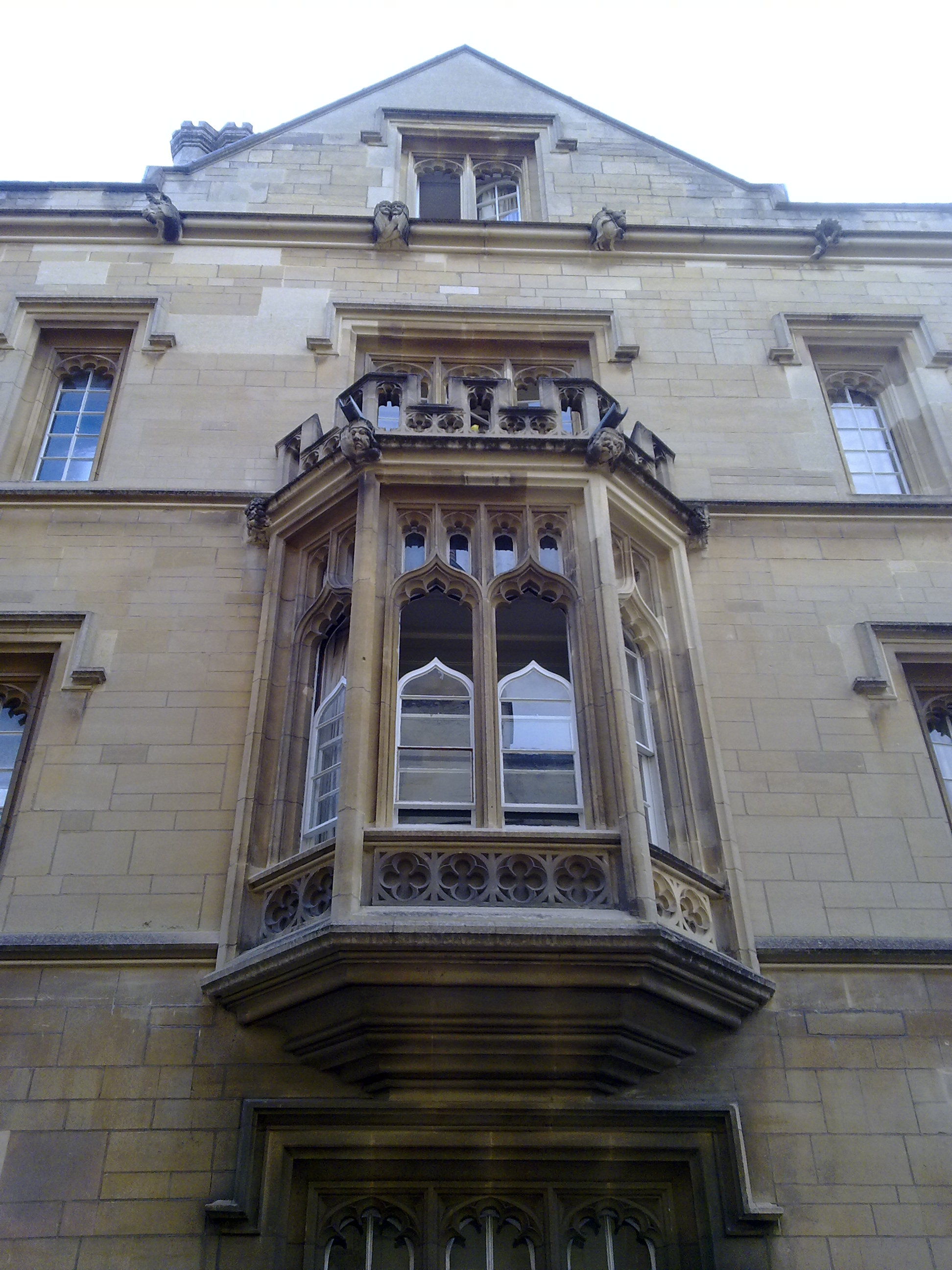
A bay window in Exeter College as seen from Turl Street, adjacent to the entrance to Brasenose Lane.

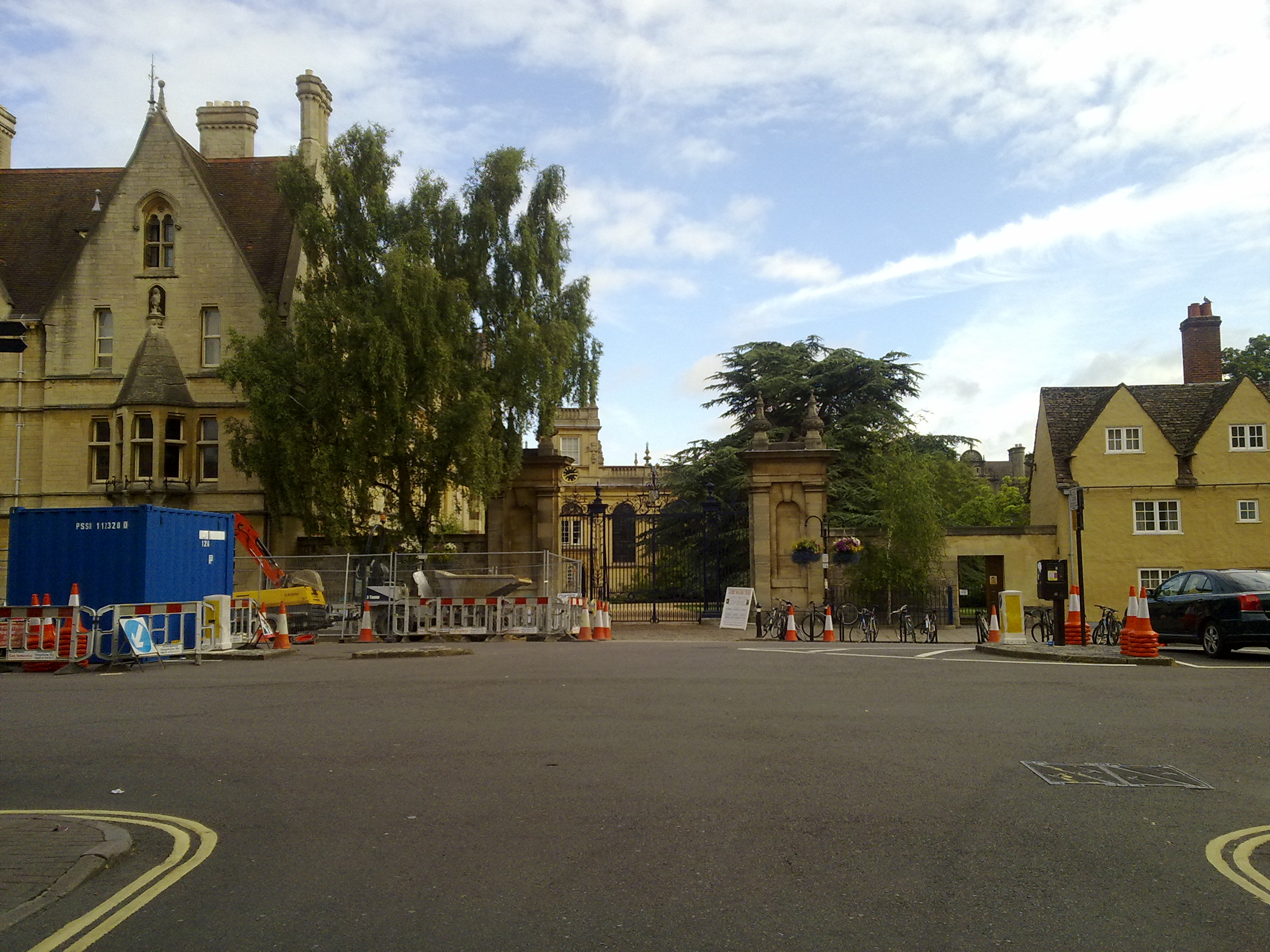
The northern end of Turl Street, looking into The Broad, towards Balliol and Trinity Colleges.
