= Market Street, Oxford =

Street in central Oxford, England

Coordinates: 51.75324°N 1.25663°W

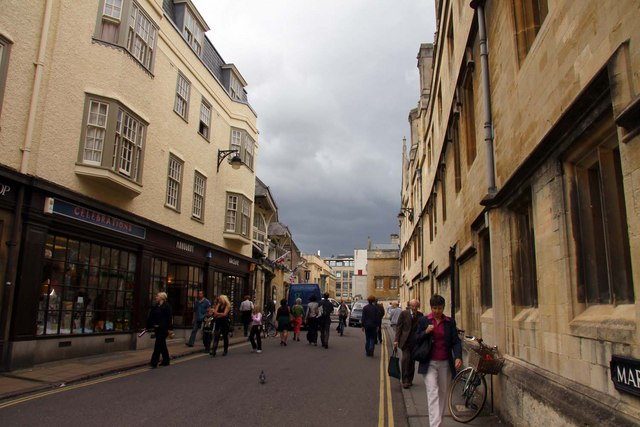
Market Street from the west end with Jesus College on the right

Market Street is a street in central Oxford, England, running east to west.

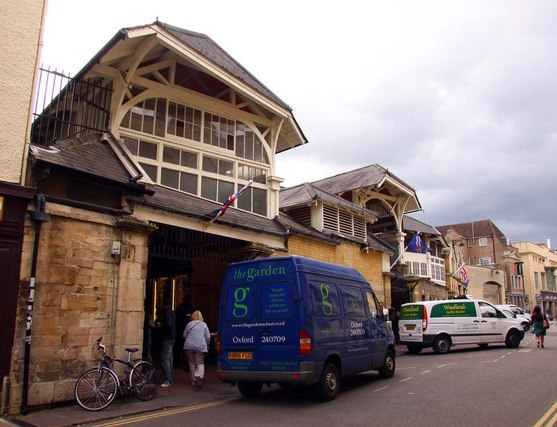
View of the Covered Market on the south side of Market Street

The street lies north of the Covered Market, a historic roofed market with permanent stalls that is still active today, and north of Lincoln College's Lincoln House accommodation complex. To the west is the major pedestrianised shopping street, Cornmarket Street, and to the east is Turl Street. On the north side of the street is Jesus College, one of Oxford University's historic colleges with its main entrance in the Turl.

The Abingdon Arms, formerly in Market Street and demolished in 1961, was named after the Earl of Abingdon, who owned the site. Other inns and public houses besides the Abingdon Arms in Market Street historically (during the 19th century) included the Crown and Thistle, the Roebuck Tap (later just the Roebuck), and the Seven Stars.

The Market Tavern (formerly the City Tavern, Bar Oz and the Roebuck public house) was once located on the south side of Market Street. The Oxford University Jazz Club (now the Oxford University Jazz Society) had met there for jazz performances and jam sessions. The Tavern has since been replaced by a noodle restaurant.

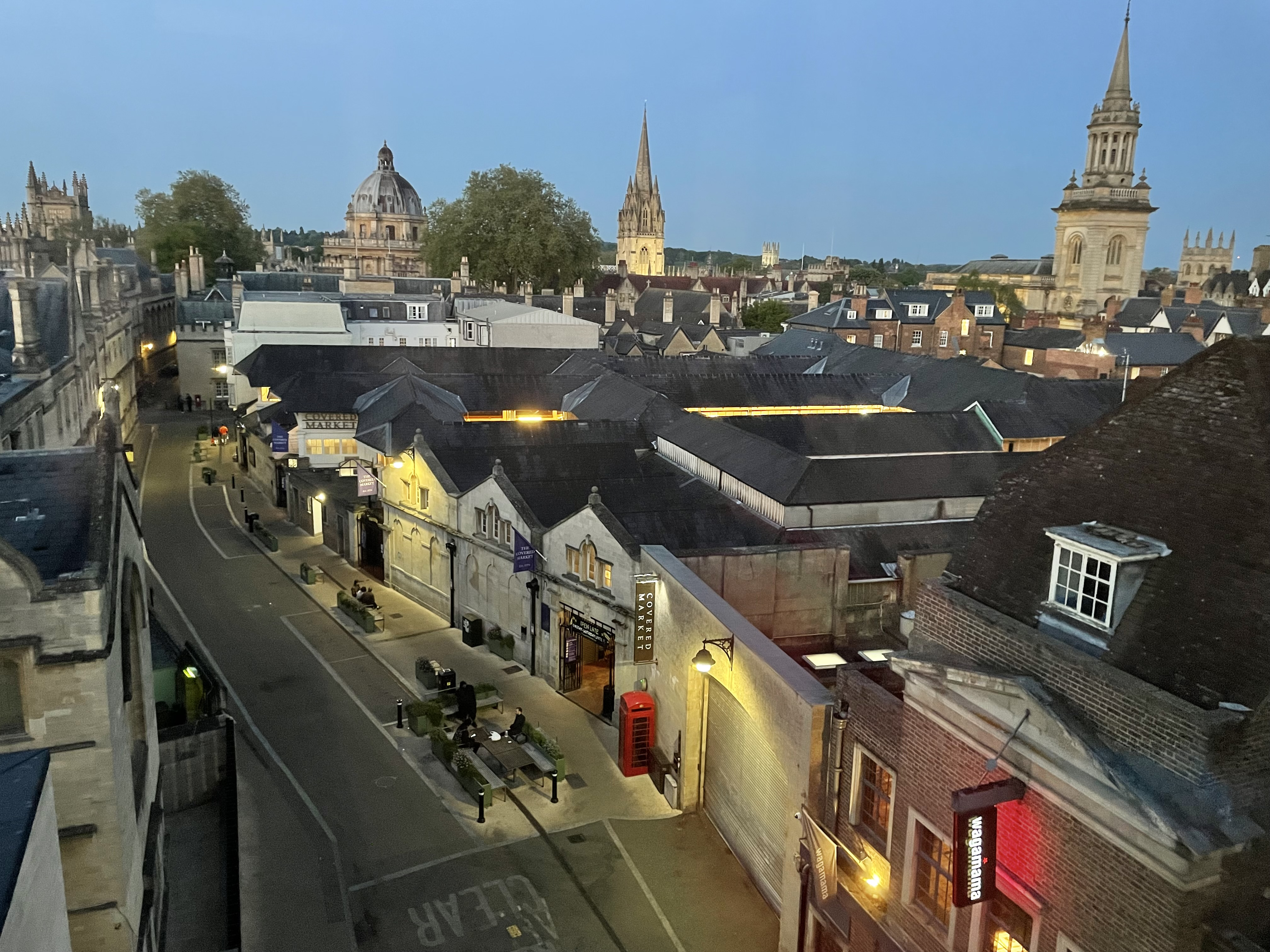
An aerial view of Market Street, looking east at dusk

To the east, over Turl Street, Market Street continues as Brasenose Lane, accessible to pedestrians and cyclists only, and named after Brasenose College, located to the south at its far end. This lane, used as a cut-through route by students and other locals, emerges into cobbled Radcliffe Square at its eastern end. To the north of Brasenose Lane is Exeter College and at the western end to the south is Lincoln College.

In the 1960s, Market Street was used by "mods" to park scooters, such as Lambrettas and Vespas. They were parked in a single line, at a 90-degree angle to the path, facing the Marks and Spencer store window.
