= Buildings of Jesus College, Oxford =

University buildings

Coordinates: 51°45′12.32″N 1°15′25.09″W

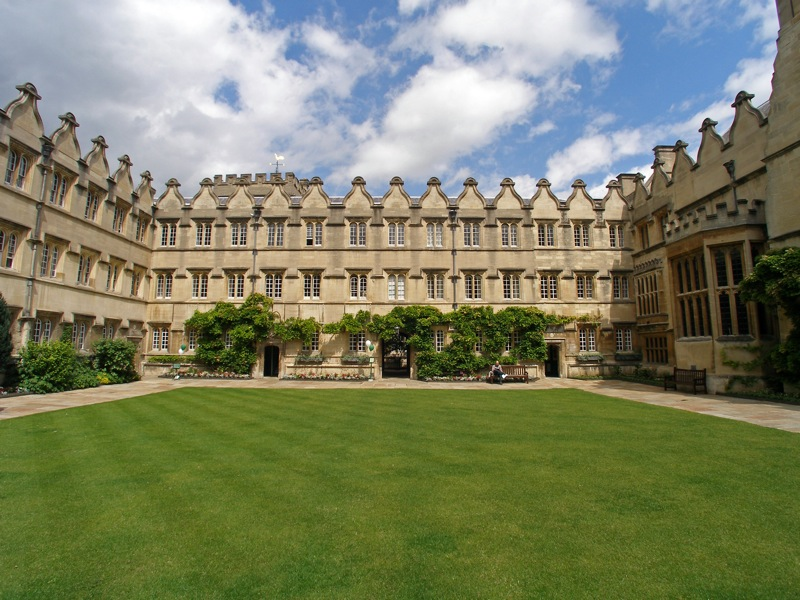
The second quadrangle (built c. 1640–c.1712) of Jesus College, with the large bay window of the hall on the right

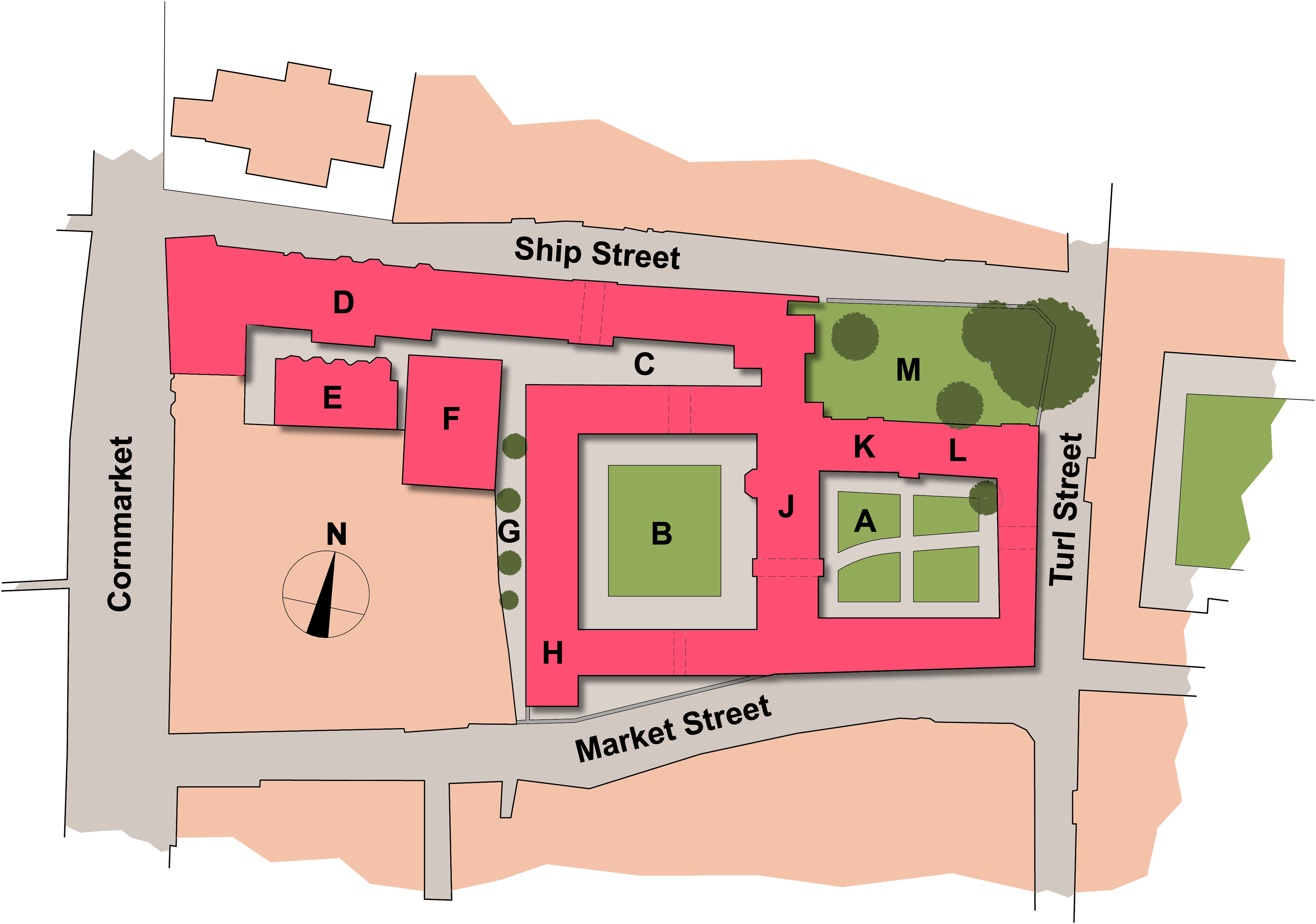
Plan, with college buildings on the main site highlighted: A: First quadrangle; B: Second quadrangle; C: Third quadrangle; D: Junior common room; E: Habakkuk room; F: Old members' building; G: Fellows' garden; H: Fellows' library; J: Hall; K: Principal's lodgings; L: Chapel; M: Principal's garden

The main buildings of Jesus College, one of the colleges of the University of Oxford, are located in the centre of the city of Oxford, England, between Turl Street, Ship Street, Cornmarket Street, and Market Street. Jesus College was founded in 1571 by Elizabeth I caused by the petition of a Welsh clergyman, Hugh Price, who was treasurer of St David's Cathedral. Her foundation charter gave to the college the land and buildings of White Hall, a university hall that had experienced a decline in student numbers. Price added new buildings to those of White Hall, and construction work continued after his death in 1574. The first of the college's quadrangles, which includes the hall, chapel, and principal's lodgings was completed between 1621 and 1630. Construction of the second quadrangle began in the 1630s, but was interrupted by the English Civil War and was not completed until about 1712. Further buildings were erected in a third quadrangle during the 20th century, including science laboratories (now closed), a library for undergraduates, and additional accommodation for students and fellows. In addition to the main site, the college owns flats in east and north Oxford, and a sports ground.

The chapel, which was dedicated in 1621 and extended in 1636, was extensively altered in 1864 under the supervision of the architect George Edmund Street. The alterations have had their supporters and their critics; one historian of the college (Ernest Hardy, principal from 1921 to 1925) described the work as "ill-considered". The hall's original hammerbeam roof was hidden by a plaster ceiling in 1741 when rooms were installed in the roof space. The principal's lodgings, the last part of the first quadrangle to be constructed, contain wooden panelling from the early 17th century. The Fellows' Library in the second quadrangle dates from 1679 and contains 11,000 antiquarian books; it was restored at a cost of £700,000 in 2007. A new Junior Common Room, about twice the size of its predecessor, was completed in the third quadrangle in 2002. Further student and teaching rooms were added in Ship Street, opposite the college, in 2010.

Eleven parts of the college are listed buildings, including all four sides of the first and second quadrangles. Nine parts, including the chapel, hall, and principal's lodgings, have the highest Grade I designation, given to buildings of exceptional interest. Two other parts (an external wall and an early 20th-century addition in the third quadrangle) have a Grade II designation, given to buildings of national importance and special interest. The architectural historian Sir Nikolaus Pevsner described the first quadrangle as "small and pretty", and said that the reredos behind the chapel altar was "heavily gorgeous"; he was, however, critical of the Old Members' Building in the third quadrangle, opened in 1971, describing it as a "mannered and modish design". The historian John Julius Norwich said that the first quadrangle had "a curious charm", while the second quadrangle had "a strong feeling of unity owing to the somewhat relentless succession of ogival gables". The poet Sir John Betjeman said that the clear planning of the first and second quadrangles, coupled with the relationship of their size to the heights of the buildings around them, "make what would be undistinguished buildings judged on their detail, into something distinguished". However, he regarded the early 20th-century additions in the third quadrangle as "dull".

== Layout ==
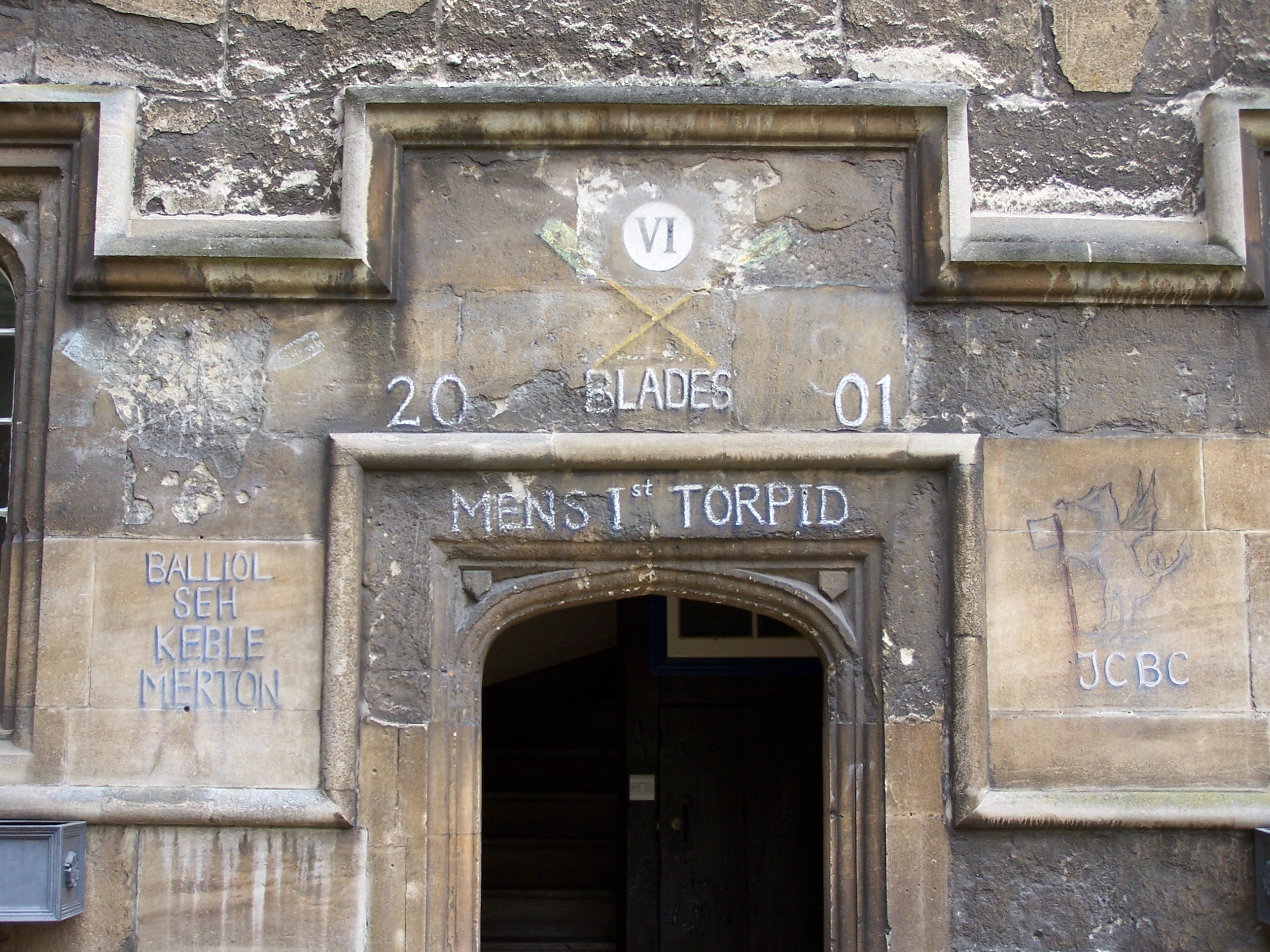
The entrance to Staircase VI, in the second quadrangle; the graffiti celebrates the success of the college boat club in Torpids, the spring inter-college races.

The college buildings on the main site are arranged in three quadrangles, the first quadrangle containing the oldest college buildings and the third quadrangle the newest. The quadrangles are often referred to as "First Quad", "Second Quad" and "Third Quad" for short. As is often the case in Oxford colleges, the rooms in the older buildings are connected to the quadrangles by a series of staircases, rather than horizontally to each other by internal corridors. The staircases are numbered (sometimes using Roman numerals): staircases 1 to 5 are in the first quadrangle; staircases 6 to 13 in the second quadrangle; and staircases 14 to 21 in the third quadrangle. The stairs on staircase 3 were replaced with stone steps in 1878, setting what one historian of the college (J. N. L. Baker, a fellow of the college from 1939 to 1971) termed "an unfortunate precedent", since the "ugly pattern" of staircase 3 was adopted when repairs were carried out to staircase 13 after a fire in 1882.

== Foundation and buildings in 1571 ==
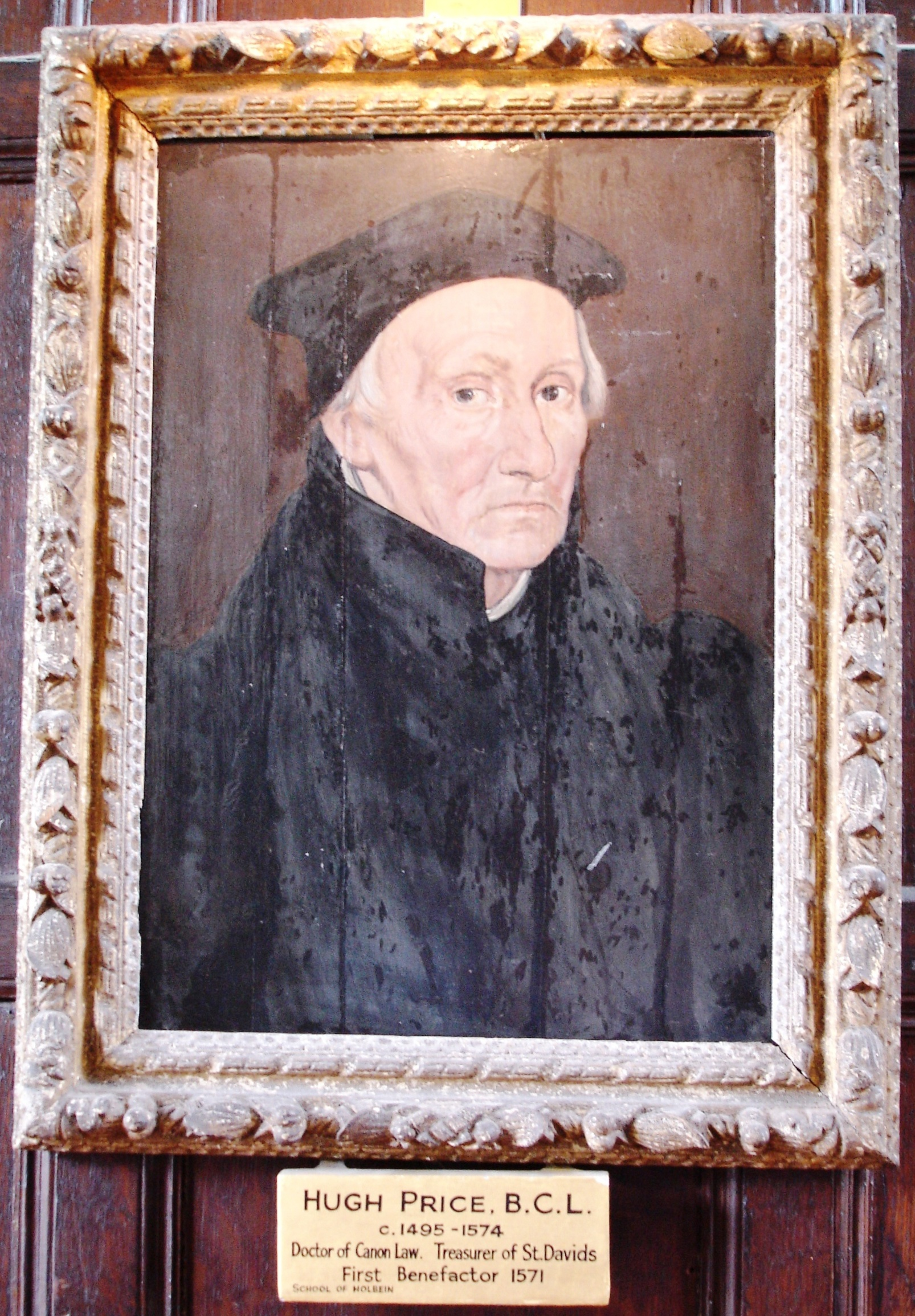
The portrait of Hugh Price, college founder, in the hall

The foundation charter of the college, issued by Elizabeth I on 27 June 1571 upon the petition of Hugh Price (treasurer of St David's Cathedral), gave to the college a site located between the present-day Market Street (to the south) and Ship Street (to the north); this remains part of the college's site. The charter also gave the buildings of White Hall, one of a number of university halls in this location. Halls provided lodgings and meals for students at the university, and sometimes lectures and tuition as well. As the system of colleges grew, however, halls declined in popularity and their sites and buildings tended to be taken over by colleges. White Hall itself had previously belonged to St Frideswide's Priory and dated back to the 13th century; it was described as "a large tenement with a great stone gate" and was sometimes known as Great White Hall. Over time, it seems to have absorbed neighbouring halls, including Little White Hall on Ship Street from about 1450, which was at one time owned by Osney Abbey. By 1571, however, White Hall was either completely or virtually deserted by students, making it possible for Price to secure the site for the new college. The college paid a quit-rent for the land upon which White Hall stood to Christ Church, Oxford, which had acquired the assets of St Frideswide's Priory. This was initially 26 shillings and 8 pence, but it had been reduced to 8 pence before 1631; it was paid until 1866, when the charge was redeemed. The land was described in Christ Church's records as extending "from the Street to the Walnut tree; & in breadth from the Bowling-Alley to the mud-wall", although no measurements were given.

The college also acquired the sites of other former halls in the vicinity, including Laurence Hall, previously owned by Lincoln College. The last principal of White Hall, James Charnock, had taken a lease on Laurence Hall, but was unable to attract sufficient students to satisfy Lincoln College and so he transferred the lease to Griffith Lloyd, who was principal of Jesus College from 1572 until his death in 1586; Lloyd bequeathed the lease to the college in his will. Part of the college chapel was later erected on the site, which measured 32 by 30 yards (29 by 27 m).

== First quadrangle ==
=== Construction ===
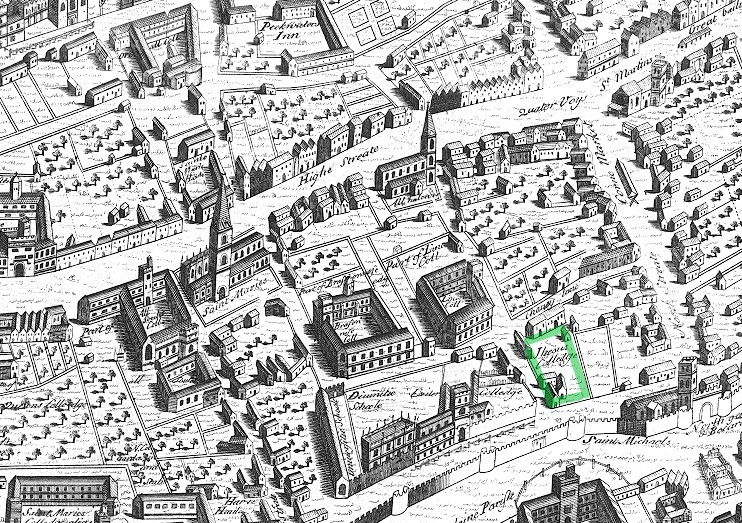
Part of Ralph Agas's map of Oxford (1578) (south at the top), with the college (highlighted) near the city wall

The first quadrangle is smaller than the later second quadrangle, measuring 93 feet 6 inches by 77 feet (28.50 by 23 m). The buildings that now surround the first quadrangle were erected in stages between 1571 and the 1620s; the principal's lodgings were the last to be built. Progress was slow because the new college lacked the "generous endowments" that earlier colleges enjoyed. Before new buildings were completed, the students lived in the old buildings of White Hall. Between 1571 and his death in 1574, Price spent about £1,500 (Note: £1,500 in 1574 would be worth approximately £4.8M in today's terms, adjusting for the growth in average earnings.) on the construction of buildings that were two storeys high. These ran from Turl Street (on the east of the site) south towards the corner of Cheyney Lane (as Market Street was then known) and then west along Cheyney Lane to the buildings of the old Great White Hall. Land at the corner of Turl Street and Cheyney Lane was leased and built upon, and then purchased in 1580. There is a college tradition, recorded in the college's first book of benefactors in the 17th century, that Elizabeth I gave "all kind of timber" from Shotover and Stow Wood for buildings erected by Price. Until the later building works of Griffith Powell and Sir Eubule Thelwall (principals from 1613 to 1620 and 1621 to 1630 respectively), the college site consisted of "a number of smallish, mainly detached buildings with nothing resembling a formal garden layout in between".

Ralph Agas's 1578 map of Oxford shows the extent of the buildings at that time. Laurence Hall is the "isolated group of buildings" on the corner of Turl Street and Ship Street. There is then a gap along Turl Street before a building positioned south of the current entrance with glazed windows facing Turl Street and a large window or loft door at its north end; another building then runs to the old White Hall buildings. The Turl Street entrance appears from Agas's map to date from after Price's death, and the north side of the building on Turl Street may have been integrated into an extension early in the 17th century, although the date of such work is unclear; Price is nevertheless sometimes given the credit for the archway on the inside of the entrance on the first quadrangle. Overall, whilst the structure of the buildings erected by Price remains, only a little of his work can be seen from the outside, after various alterations in the intervening centuries; nevertheless, his buildings have been said to retain "much of their original character".

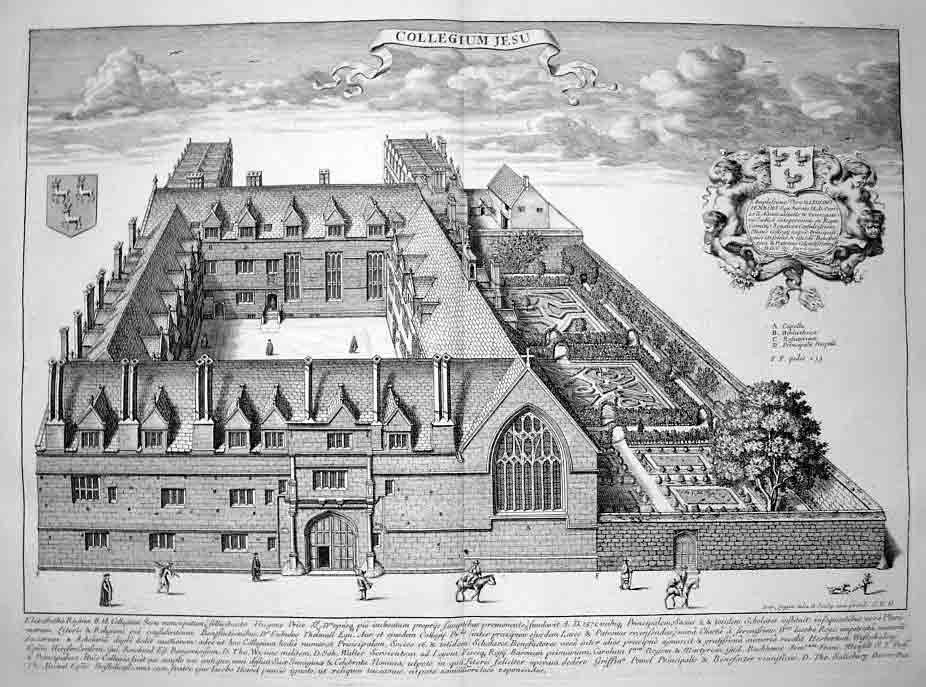
An engraving from 1675 by David Loggan, showing the Turl Street face of the college, with the chapel on the right adjoining the gardens of the Principal's lodgings

Some land in Ship Street to the west of the college was leased from Exeter College in 1590, and further construction work took place after Powell was appointed principal in 1613. Powell raised money from donors in Oxford, London, and Wales, collecting £838 12s 2d (Note: £838 12s 2d in 1613 would be worth approximately £2.4M in today's terms, adjusting for the growth in average earnings.) in what has been described as "an elaborate fundraising scheme", with efforts to attract donations from old members of the college. Ann Lloyd, the widow of Griffith Lloyd (principal from 1572 to 1586) gave £100. (Note: £100 in 1613 would be worth approximately £290,000 in today's terms, adjusting for the growth in average earnings.) Richard Parry, the Bishop of St Asaph, gave £66 13s 4d out of the total from Welsh clergy of £78 7s 4d. (Note: £66 13s 4d and £78 7s 4d in 1613 would be worth approximately £193,000 and £228,000 in today's terms, adjusting for the growth in average earnings.) The old Great White Hall buildings were demolished around 1620 and replaced, and a kitchen and buttery were constructed. Work also started on building the hall and the chapel under Powell; both were completed after his death in 1620. Sir Eubule Thelwall, who became principal in 1621, raised £465 15s 6d (Note: £465 15s 6d in 1613 would be worth approximately £1.35M in today's terms, adjusting for the growth in average earnings.) from donors, including Sir Julius Caesar, the Master of the Rolls, and Edward Littleton, the Recorder of London. This was used for "the perfecting of the Quadrangle of the building and furnishing of the library". The college then had a complete quadrangle of buildings, save for a gap between the chapel and the hall that would later be filled by the principal's lodgings, built by Thelwall at his own expense; the library (later demolished) was outside the quadrangle, to the west of the north end of the lodgings.

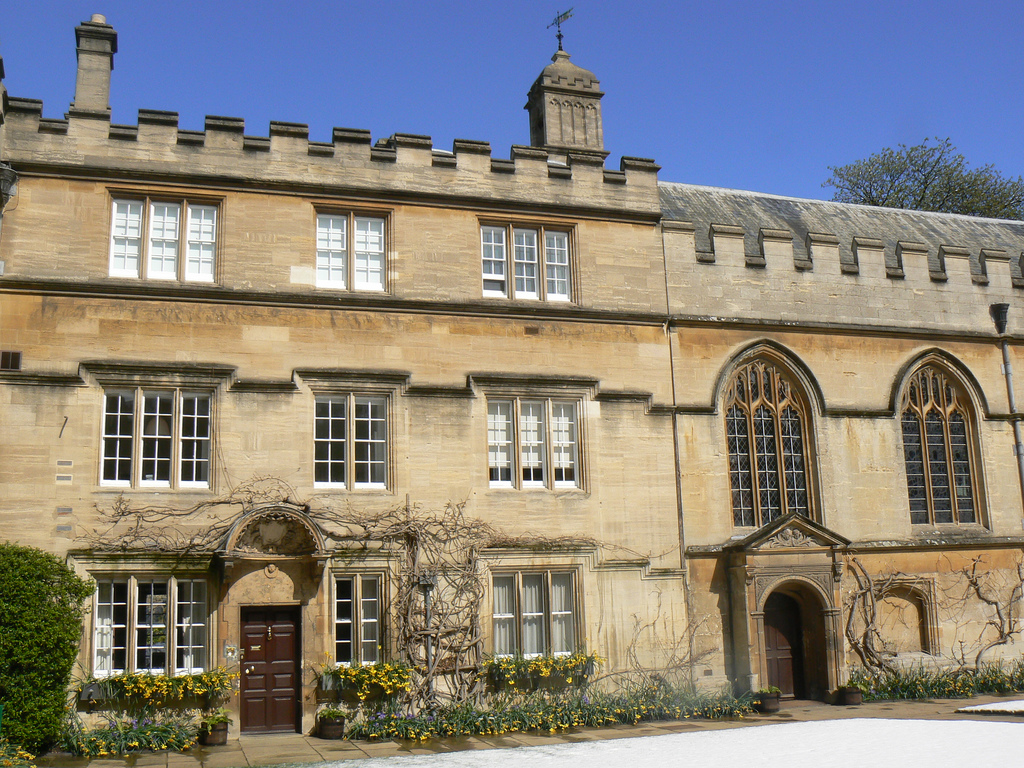
The principal's lodgings (left, 1620s) and the chapel (right, completed 1621), with the original chapel entrance, now blocked, to the right of the door

The walls of the college were built using rubble from Oxfordshire dressed with local stone. The remaining parts of the 17th-century walls are dressed with Headington stone, which was a common building material in Oxford at that time: the geologist W. J. Arkell wrote that it was used for every building in Oxford constructed during this century for which records exist. Areas of Headington stone can be seen in the first quadrangle on the wall of the hall. It was only discovered towards the end of the 18th century that it did not weather well: the surface of the stone develops a hard crust, which blisters, bursts and comes off. Much of it has subsequently been replaced with other materials as a result.

=== Later work ===
Further work was carried out to the east side of the college, fronting onto Turl Street, in 1756 under Thomas Pardo (principal from 1727 to 1763). A new doorway replaced the previous Elizabethan one, and the front of the college was remodelled in the Palladian style – oblong sash windows were inserted at all levels and the original gables on the Turl Street side of the building were removed. Pardo himself gave £157 10s (Note: £157 10s in 1756 would be worth approximately £287,000 in today's terms, adjusting for the growth in average earnings.) towards this work, although this only met the mason's bill of £156 18s 11d and not the other large bills for the work. In the opinion of Ernest Hardy, a college fellow who wrote a history of the college in 1899 and who served as principal from 1921 to 1925, this "complete transformation" gave the college a "somewhat incongruous appearance". The result was also said to resemble a "prison". One writer at the time, however, thought that the changes had not gone far enough. Thomas Warton, the Oxford Professor of Poetry, wrote a letter about architecture in Oxford to Jackson's Oxford Journal in 1766. He included Pardo's alterations to Jesus College in his list of improvements, but advocated replacing the chapel window with one in another design:

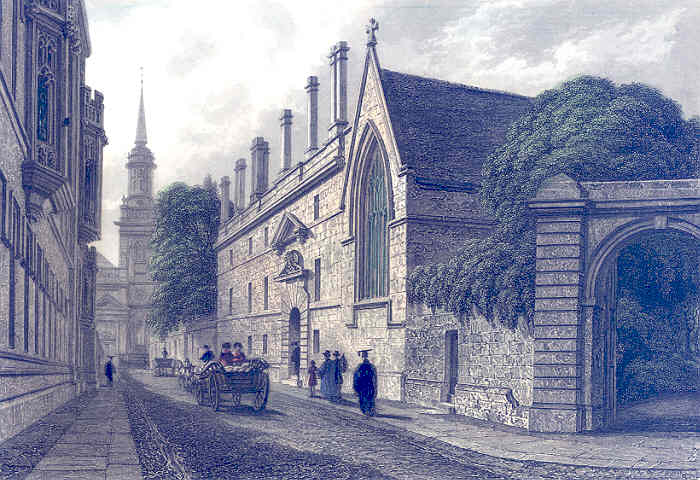
Pardo's alterations are shown in this 1837 engraving.

The Front of Jesus College, within these few years, has been cleared from the Bronze of Antiquity, and beautified with a modern Portico. But, with due Submission, I am of Opinion, that the contiguous Eastern Window of the Chapel, which is still absurdly suffered to remain with its antique Mullions and Ramifications, is by no means of a piece with the rest. I would therefore humbly suggest in it's stead, a spacious Venetian-Window.

Joseph Hoare (principal from 1768 to 1802) gave £200 (Note: £200 in 1791 would be worth approximately £260,000 in today's terms, adjusting for the growth in average earnings.) in total in 1791 and 1792 for repairs in the first quadrangle, part of a general pattern of expenditure upon repair of the older college buildings in the 18th century. In 1815, the original gables in the first quadrangle were removed and replaced with a third storey and battlements, matching the lodgings where battlements had been erected between 1733 and 1740. The height of the chapel wall was increased, and many of the windows were altered. The college received advice from the architect John Nash about this work; he requested that, instead of paying him, the college should commission a portrait of him from Sir Thomas Lawrence to hang in the hall. Lawrence depicted Nash in his house in Regent Street, London; the portrait has been described by Lawrence's biographer, the art historian Sir Michael Levey, as "pungently vivid".

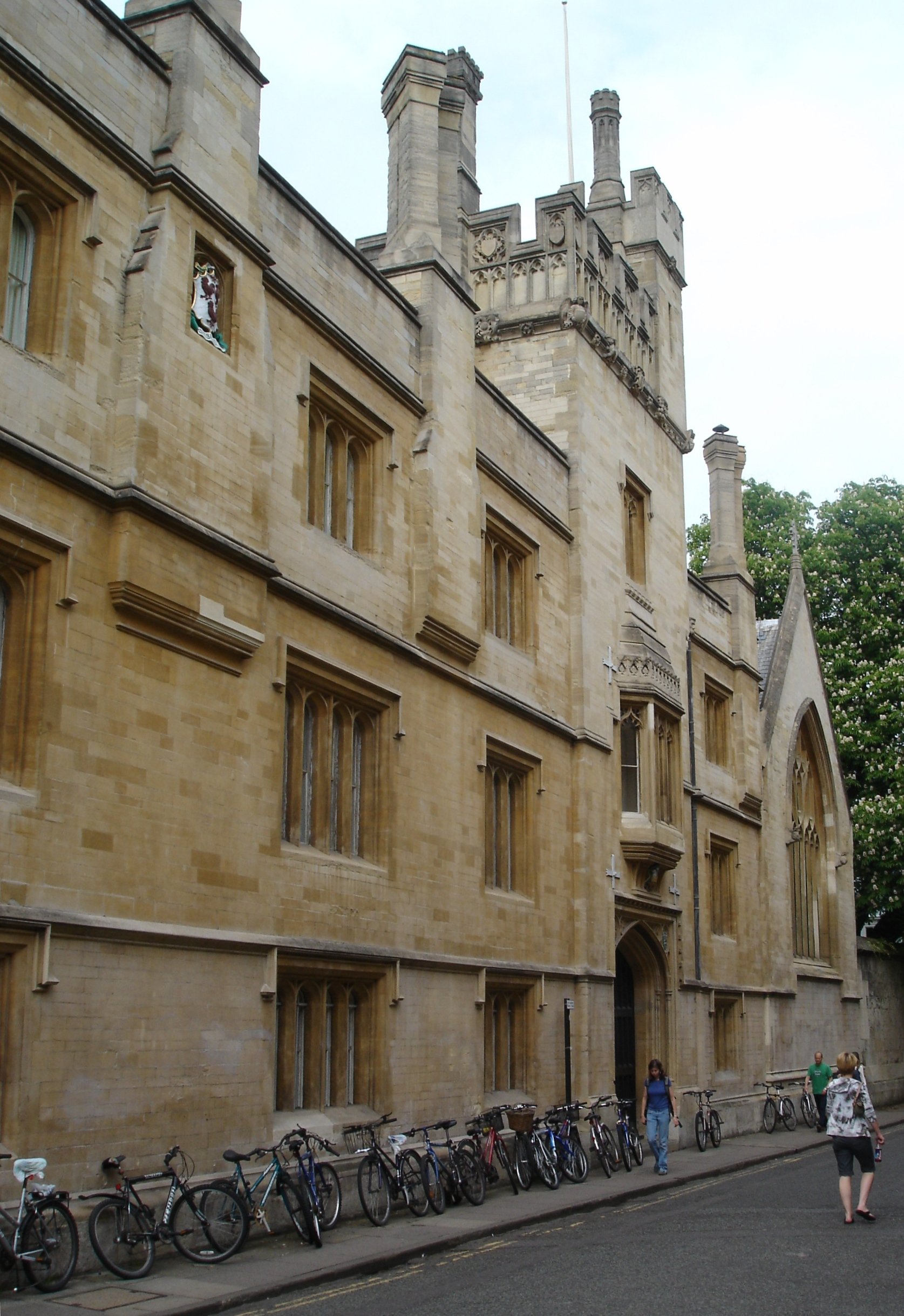
The Turl Street exterior of the college, refaced in Bath stone in 1856, with the 1636 chapel window at the far right

In 1853, under the direction of John Chessell Buckler (architect to the college from 1852 to 1882), the south front of the buildings was restored; the exterior of the buildings on Turl Street was re-faced in Bath stone in 1856, with the tower over the gateway being built at the same time. The total cost of this work was £3,349. (Note: £3,349 in 1856 would be worth approximately £8.35M in today's terms, adjusting for changes in GDP.) Pardo's changes from the 18th century were removed. The Gentleman's Magazine in 1856 complimented Buckler on "resisting the stream" and following the style of the 15th century. Peter Howell, a writer on Victorian architecture, referred to Buckler's work as "[providing] Jesus with an attractive new front which represents the beau idéal of an Oxford college". The poet John Betjeman said that the front of the college opposite Exeter College was "a good specimen" of Gothic Revival work. In contrast, the architectural historian Geoffrey Tyack noted that the refacing came not long after the two other colleges in Turl Street (Exeter and Lincoln) had been refaced, and commented that Buckler's work, in "Collegiate Gothic" style, "completed a process whereby the façades of the colleges in Turl Street acquired a somewhat lifeless homogeneity which they had never possessed in the past". W. J. Arkell wrote that "some of the worst horrors of the Gothic revival" cluster on either side of Turl Street. When writing a history of the college in 1891, the vice-principal Llewellyn Thomas said that the work was "admitted to be very well done", but that there were those who thought that "the old Jacobean gateway was more in harmony with the domestic architecture of the College, and more suitable to its position in a narrow street". The stonework on the front of the college was last cleaned in 2000, when the porters' lodge by the Turl Street entrance was also rebuilt, to provide better office accommodation for the porters, individual post boxes for students, and greater security. Four grass plots were added to the centre of the quadrangle in 1896, crossed by Yorkstone paths; before that, it had been gravelled since 1662.

The architectural historian Sir Nikolaus Pevsner described the first quadrangle as "small and pretty, especially because of the variety of its ranges". He noted the part-Elizabethan and part-Jacobean architecture on the south side, where Price's building stops – the join between the two, he pointed out, is "easily visible" in Market Street. The windows in the first quadrangle, he noted, were Elizabethan in style, with mullioned windows and arched lights, arranged symmetrically, whereas the hall windows were Gothic in style. The historian John Julius Norwich wrote that the first quadrangle had "a curious charm, due partly to its size and partly due to its several small eccentricities", including the curved path crossing the quadrangle from the entrance to the hall. The architect and designer Sir Hugh Casson, though, thought that the "crooked off-axis line" of the path was the college's oddest feature. All four sides of the first quadrangle are Grade I listed buildings (the highest grade, for buildings of exceptional importance and international interest): the lodgings and chapel on the north side, the hall on the west side, and the buildings on the east and south sides.

=== Chapel ===
==== Construction and fittings ====
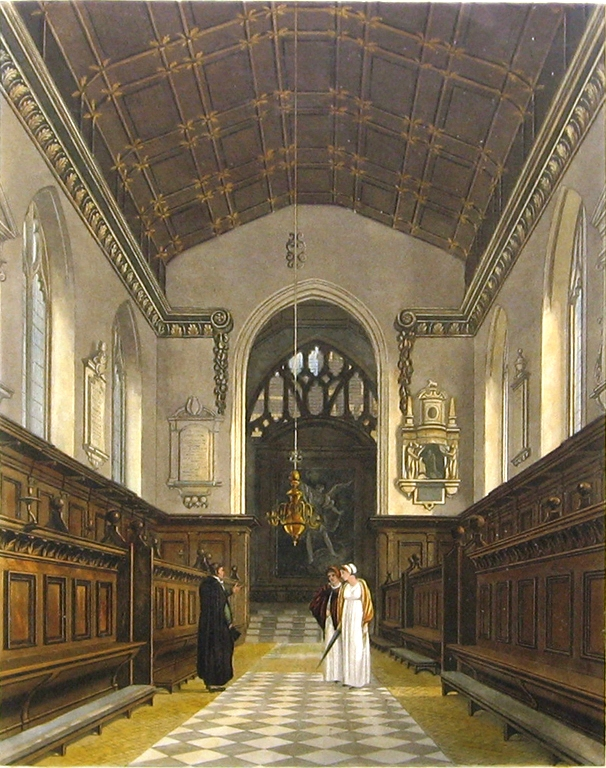
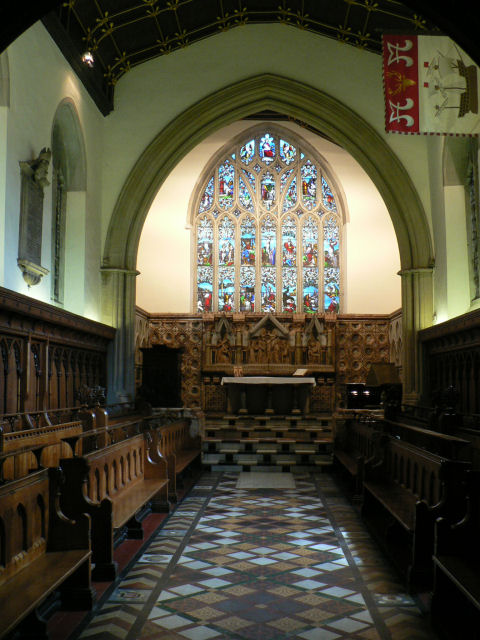
The interior of the chapel – in 1814, before alterations in the mid-19th century (left); in 2006 (right)

Construction of the chapel began when Griffith Powell was Principal (1613–1620). It was finished under Sir Eubule Thelwall (who took office in 1621), with the Bishop of Oxford leading the dedication ceremony on 28 May 1621. Thelwall's portrait, displayed in the hall, shows him holding a roll inscribed "A plan of the Chappell in Jesus Coll., Oxford built by Sir Eubule Thelwall", reflecting the fact that he was the main donor towards the chapel's construction. There are four windows facing the quadrangle in the Perpendicular style. Seats were added in 1633, and it was extended in two directions in 1636. The east end was moved to reach Turl Street, a new east window was added and the previous window was converted into an arch; at the other end, the entrance was moved further to the west. Sir Charles Williams of Monmouthshire, south Wales, paid £200 (Note: £200 in 1636 would be worth approximately £454,000 in today's terms, adjusting for the growth in average earnings.) towards the final bill of £211. (Note: £211 in 1636 would be worth approximately £479,000 in today's terms, adjusting for the growth in average earnings.)

The architectural historian Giles Worsley has described the chapel's east window as an instance of Gothic Revival architecture, rather than Gothic Survival, since a choice was made to use an outdated style – classical architecture had become accepted as "the only style in which it was respectable to build". The window has seven main sections ("lights") topped with five-headed flower shapes, or cinquefoils, and tracery running vertically. The chapel is one of various buildings at the universities of Oxford and Cambridge from the first half of the 17th century where Gothic designs were deliberately chosen in preference to Classical; other examples are the chapel of Lincoln College, Oxford, the chapel windows and hall roof at Wadham College, Oxford, and the library of St John's College, Cambridge, where the library of 1624 was built with Gothic windows since "some men of judgement" preferred the old fashion as it was "most meet for such a building". Similarly, the artist and art historian Aymer Vallance, writing in 1908, said that Gothic architecture, though "ailing and doomed", "lingered longest" at Oxford University, adding that the chapel windows of Jesus and Wadham were "almost as astonishing for their period" as the "magnificent" 1640 fan-vaulted entrance to the hall of Christ Church, Oxford, built nearly three hundred years after fan vaulting had been used in the cloisters of Gloucester Cathedral. The only examples of classical style in Oxford before the Civil War were Archbishop Laud's Canterbury Quad at St John's and a few gateways such as those at the Botanic Garden by Nicholas Stone; Cambridge had even less. The chapel has not been universally appreciated, however: the antiquarian and archivist Rowley Lascelles wrote in 1821 that "excepting that it was built by private contributions from the gentry of Wales, it would be cruel to say any thing about it".

The chancel measures 16 feet 6 inches by 22 feet 9 inches (5.03 by 6.93 m), and the main body of the chapel measures 52 feet 6 inches by 22 feet (16 by 6.7 m). A London merchant, Lewis Roberts, gave "some hundreds of white and black marble stones ... towards ye paving of the upper part of the chapel", according to Francis Mansell in his inventory of 1648. It is unclear when these were added to the floor; some are still in position, although others were removed in the 1864 renovation. The oak pulpit dates from the early 17th century, and has moulded rectangular panels. There is a bell turret on the west end of the roof, which has trefoil-shaped openings on the west and east sides, and panels decorated with trefoils on the other two sides. It was built in about 1915, replacing an earlier turret of similar shape.

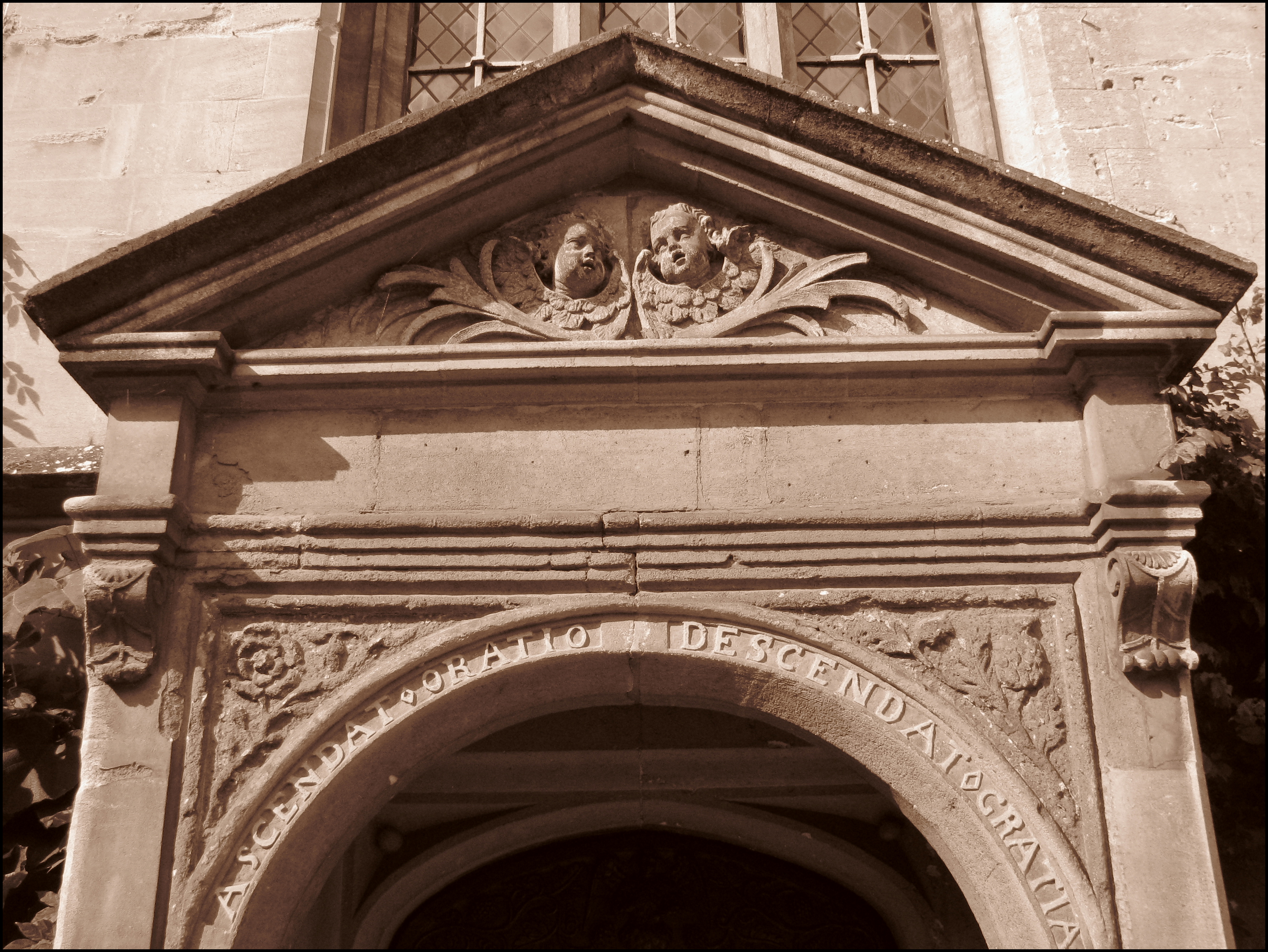
The tympanum above the entrance to the chapel

The porch at the chapel entrance was moved to its present position when the chapel was extended in 1636. The door jambs are moulded, as are the tops of the columns. The arch is divided into segments, with a rose in the left spandrel and a thistle in the right spandrel. The use of the rose and thistle (national emblems of England and Scotland respectively) in this way dates the porch to the reign of King James I, who used these flowers, halved, as his badge after his accession to the English throne in 1603. Moulded brackets support the entablature, within which the pediment contains palms and cherub-heads in the tympanum. The Latin inscription above the archway is Ascendat oratio descendat Gratia ("Let prayers ascend, and grace descend"). The original entrance was covered up when the chapel was extended; it was only re-discovered when the chapel was refaced in Bath stone in 1869.

Jonathan Edwards (principal from 1686 to 1712) is reported to have spent £1,000 (Note: £1,000 in 1712 would be worth approximately £2M in today's terms, adjusting for the growth in average earnings.) during his lifetime on the interior of the chapel, particularly in the chancel (at the east end), but also including the addition of a screen separating the main part of the chapel from the ante-chapel (at the west end) in 1693. The screen bears the coat of arms of Sir Leoline Jenkins (principal 1661–1673) and, until 1899, also bore Thelwall's coat of arms. His arms were moved to a position above the door (where, says one writer, "they can scarcely be seen") when an organ by J. J. Binns was installed in the ante-chapel in 1899. The current organ, by William Drake, was installed in 1994 to replace the Binns organ. The screen has open ovals rather than blank ovals – an example, said Pevsner, of "the importance given to openwork carving" in the later 17th century. After the installation of the screen, little changed in the chapel until the middle of the 19th century, save for some donations of items such as a brass desk and two silver candlesticks.

==== Victorian changes ====
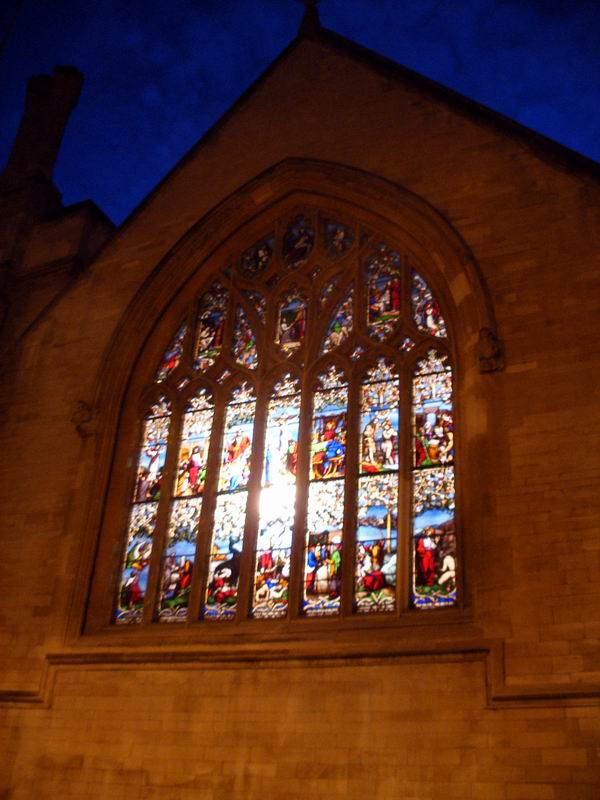
George Hedgeland's stained glass (1853) seen from Turl Street

In 1853, Henry Foulkes (principal 1817–1857), the fellows of the college and the incumbents of most of the livings within its gift donated £350 10s for stained glass by George Hedgeland to be added to the east window; the final cost was £399. (Note: £399 in 1856 would be worth approximately £995,000 in today's terms, adjusting for changes in GDP.) It shows various biblical episodes, including three instances of Christ raising people from the dead: the daughter of Jairus, the son of the widow of Nain, and Lazarus. There are also pairs of scenes from the New Testament and the Old Testament to demonstrate the typological relationship between them: for example, the Passover is paired with the Last Supper, Jonah escaping from the whale with the Resurrection of Jesus, and the ascension of Elijah with the ascension of Jesus. Pevsner described it as "a busy, somewhat gloomy piece with many small scenes". A copy of Guido Reni's painting St Michael subduing the dragon, which had been presented to the college by Thomas Bulkeley, 7th Viscount Bulkeley (a student who matriculated at the university in 1769), had previously been hung in front of the east window. When the stained glass was installed, the painting was moved to the ante-chapel; it was moved to the south wall of the chancel when the Binns organ was installed. The panels of Hedgeland's window were removed and cleaned in the summer of 2000, while maintenance was being carried out to the Turl Street stonework.

On 15 June 1863, the principal Charles Williams (principal 1857–1877) and fellows agreed to renovate the chapel. One of the prime movers behind the decision was the vice-principal, Lewis Gilbertson, as part of his unsuccessful attempt to move the college towards Anglo-Catholicism. The architect George Edmund Street was appointed, and had almost free rein in his work. In 1863, he said to the bursar that the chapel was "so good in style considering its late date" that it would be "very inadvisable to alter it in any respect, save one, the old features of the walls and roofing". However, he later said that the fittings were "incongruous", with the seats being "so thoroughly uncomfortable that kneeling is rendered all but impossible, and sitting even is concerted into a sort of penance". His work was completed in 1864, at a cost of £1,679 18s 10d. (Note: £1,679 18s 10d in 1864 would be worth approximately £3.42M in today's terms, adjusting for changes in GDP.) The arch of the chancel was widened and the memorials to Sir Eubule Thelwell and Francis Mansell, which had been on each side of the arch, were moved to the north wall of the chancel. The original Jacobean woodwork was removed, with the exception of the screen donated by Edwards and the pulpit, new seats were installed and new paving was placed in the main part of the chapel. A stone reredos was added behind the altar, although the design originally submitted by Street was not approved and he was asked to make changes. The reredos as finally installed has three marble panels: a crucifixion scene (centre), Christ carrying his cross (right) and Christ on the knees of St Mary (left). The altar has a slab and six pillars, all made from granite.

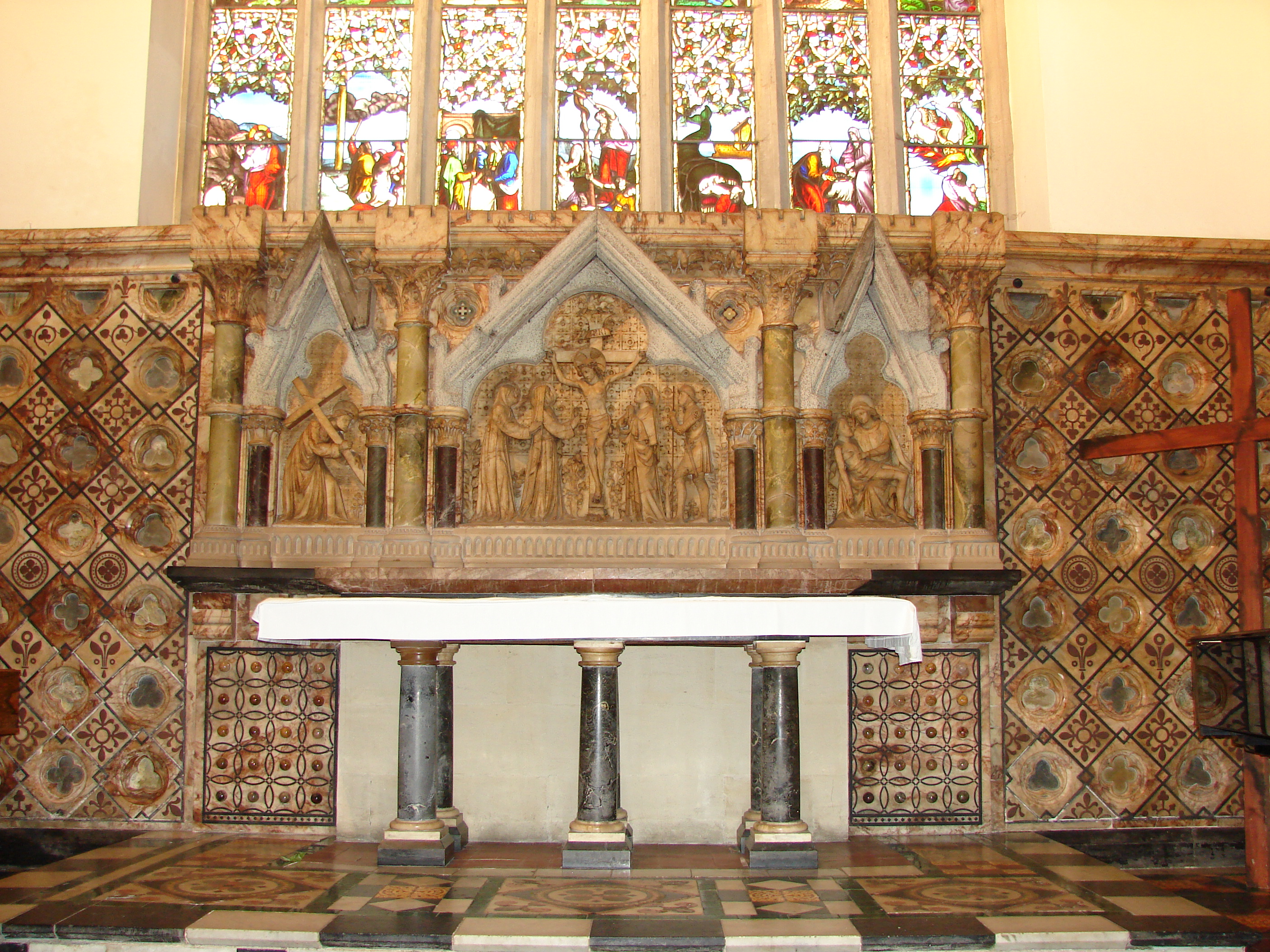
The reredos (1864)

Views of Street's alterations have differed. On 21 October 1864, Building News reported that the restoration was nearing completion and was of "a very spirited character". It said that the new "handsome" arch showed the east window "to great advantage", with "other improvements" including a "handsome reredos" and an "exceedingly beautiful" pavement of marble, alabaster and Minton's encaustic tiles. Llewellyn Thomas said that there might be two opinions as to the success of the restoration, but there was "no doubt" that widening the arch was a mistake, since "it has permanently dwarfed the proportions of the building". He said that the new woodwork, "though good of its kind", presented "too violent a contrast" with the ante-chapel screen. Hardy was also critical, calling the work "ill-considered". He complained that the Jacobean woodwork had been sold for too little, saying that it had been "ruthlessly torn up and sold for a mere song to a passing stranger", and described the reredos as "somewhat tawdry". William Stride, writing at about the same time as Hardy, said that the "beautiful" Jacobean interior of the chapel had been "destroyed", and Oxford had "narrowly escaped other irreparable losses". Norwich said that the restoration was "good in individual details" but was "sadly damaging to its character and atmosphere".

In contrast, Pevsner called the reredos "heavily gorgeous". One chaplain in the 20th century covered up the reredos with curtains, describing the brown and white marbling as looking like "corned beef". Betjeman, however, was heard when showing a group around the college to describe the altar as "delicious"; he also wrote that the chapel's "fine classic screen" had "somehow survived a fearful 'restoration'". The curtains around the altar and a carpet covering the tiling in the aisle were removed when the new organ was installed in 1994, following the organ builder's advice that these items detracted from the chapel acoustics. The work proved to be Street's only commission at the university, although he built or restored a number of churches in the city. In his biography of his father, Arthur Street said that it was possible that George Street's "very decided adherence to the earlier phase of Gothic, and the eagerness with which he argued that Oxford had already enough of debased types, and should revert to the purity of the early forms, may have frightened the authorities". Casson, although referring to the chapel and other parts of the college from the Victorian era as "mostly pretty dull", thought that the "sturdy pews with their flatly modelled leafy finials hold their own".

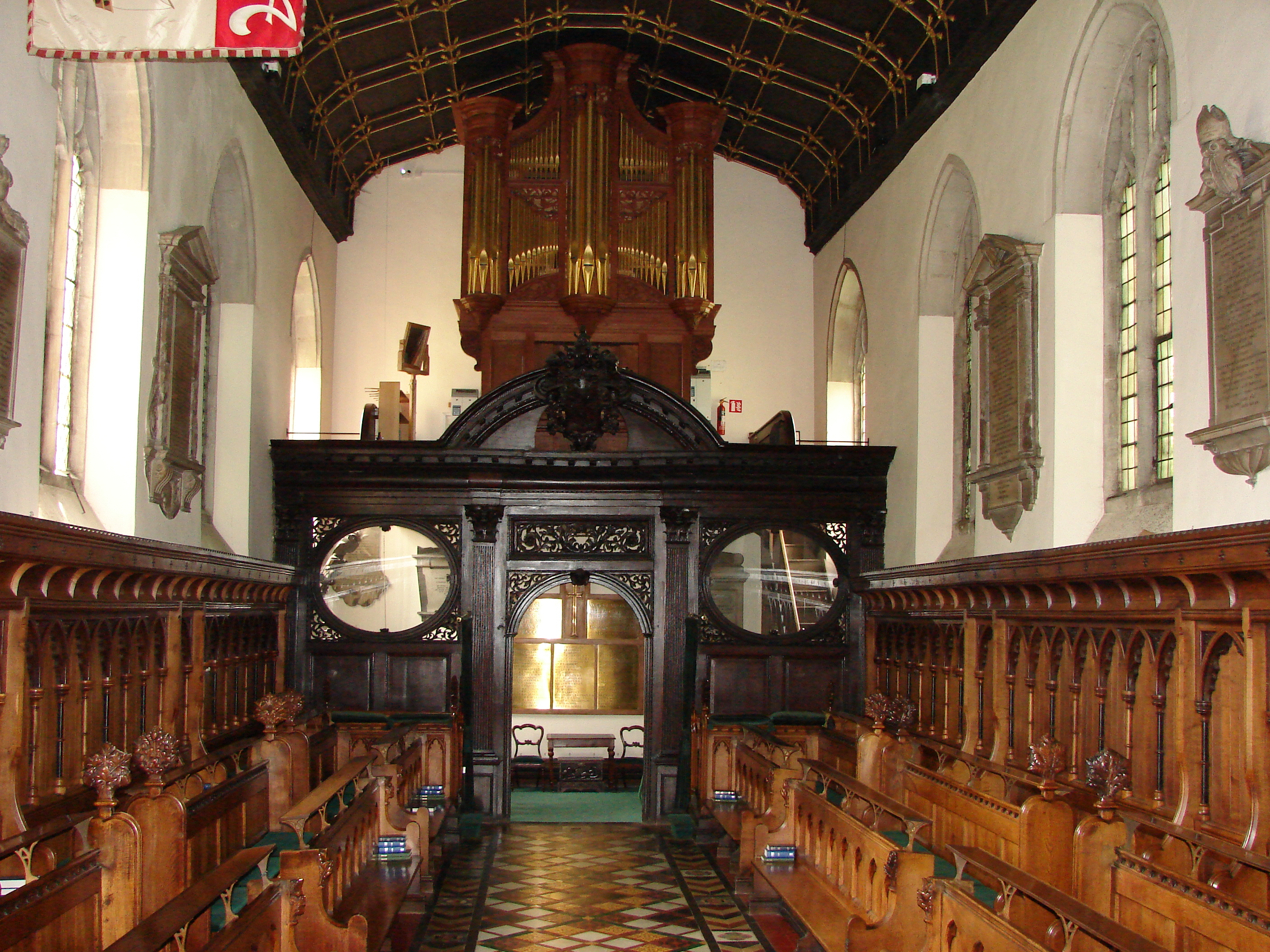
The interior of the chapel facing west; the 1994 organ by William Drake stands on top of the 1693 screen added to the chapel by Jonathan Edwards.

The woodwork removed by Street was sold for a nominal sum, with a condition that it could only be used for a hall, chapel or library. Some pieces ended up in the library and chapel of Forest School in Walthamstow, east London (an institution that previously had no link to the college). Panels under the communion rail were also removed from the chapel, even though Street had reported to the college that these carvings were the only portion of the chapel woodwork with any real value, and had suggested at one point reusing them in connection with the ante-chapel screen and the adjoining seats. Some of the woodwork was transferred to St Edern's Church, Bodedern, in Anglesey, which had links with the college from 1648 until the Church in Wales was disestablished in 1920. Some of the panels may also have been re-used in the Fellows' Library (in the second quadrangle); other panelling at Bodedern came from the college, but not apparently from the chapel, and so may have been from a disused library gallery.

==== Memorials ====
The chapel contains monuments to several former principals. In addition to those of Sir Eubule Thelwell and Francis Mansell relocated to the north wall of the chancel, there are monuments to Sir Leoline Jenkins (who is buried in the chapel), William Jones, Jonathan Edwards, Thomas Pardo, Joseph Hoare, Henry Foulkes, Charles Williams and Daniel Harper. Thelwall's monument is one of the few in Oxford to include kneeling figures. There are painted glass windows in memory of Llewellyn Thomas (by Charles Kempe), of Charles Williams (by Clayton and Bell), of Samuel Morris, a victim of the sinking of HMS Victoria in 1893 (by Westlake and Lavers), and of Lewis Gilbertson. The Garter banner of Harold Wilson (who studied at the college in the 1930s, and was twice Prime Minister) hangs on the south wall; it was donated by his widow after his death in 1995. Formerly displayed in the chapel was a bust of T. E. Lawrence (better known as "Lawrence of Arabia") by the sculptor Eric Kennington, which is a copy of the one in St Paul's Cathedral. Lawrence was a student at the college, graduating in 1910.

=== Principal's lodgings ===
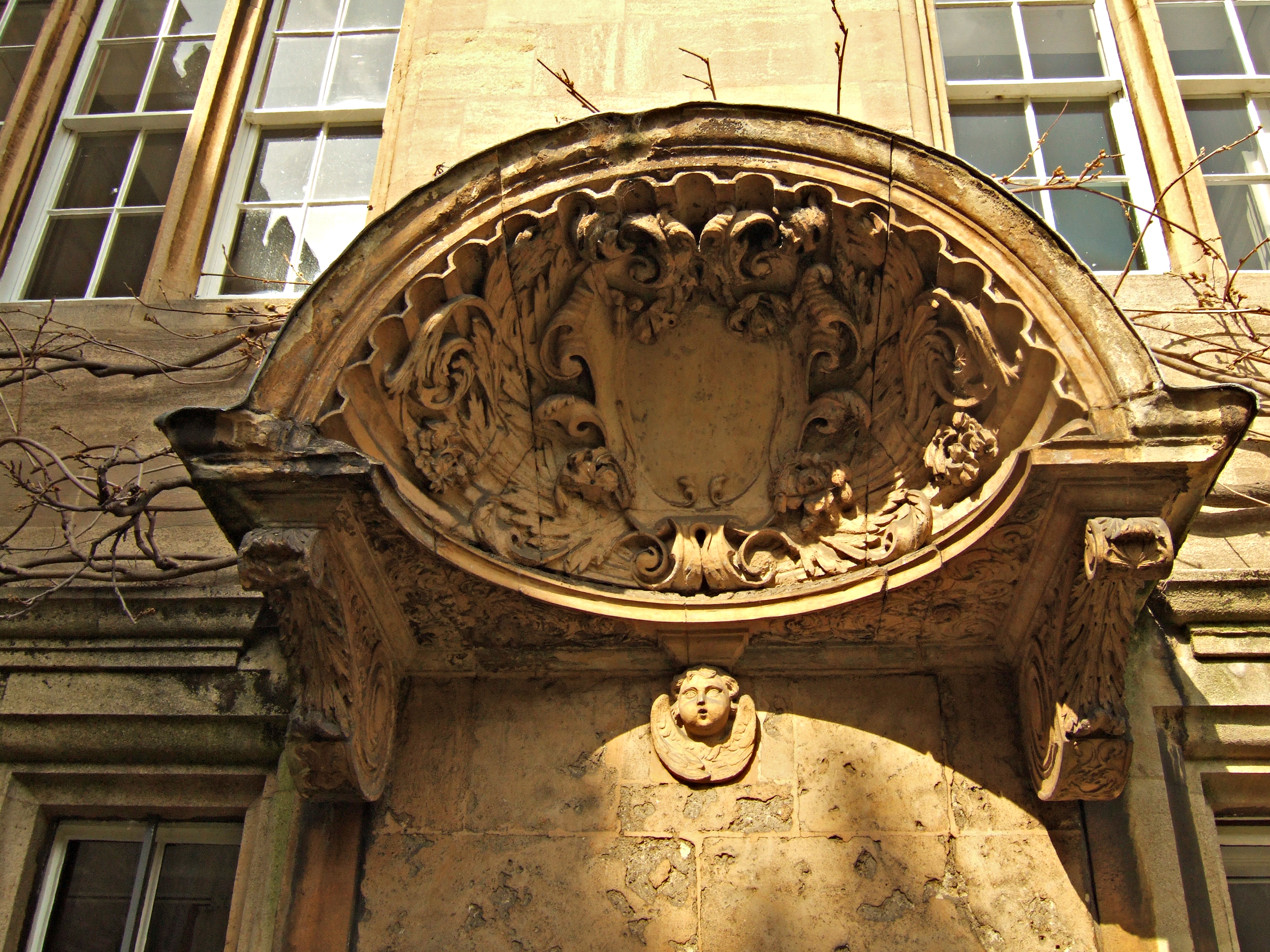
The shell-hood (added c.1700) above the front door of the lodgings

The principal of the college resides in the lodgings, a Grade I listed building, on the north side of the first quadrangle between the chapel (to the east) and the hall (to the west). They were the last part of the first quadrangle to be built. Sir Eubule Thelwall, principal from 1621 to 1630, built the lodgings at his own expense, to include (in the words of the antiquarian Anthony Wood) "a very fair dining-room adorned with wainscot curiously engraven". Tyack said that "the carved wooden panelling of the main rooms [set] a new standard of luxury for the heads of colleges". Pevsner commented that the panelling, set in three tiers with ovals placed vertically rather than horizontally, "looks both dignified and splendid". In 1637, the lodgings were considerably changed with the installation of five "studyes". The shell-hood over the doorway (which Pevsner and Casson both called "beautiful") was added at some point between 1670 and 1740; Pevsner dates it to about 1700. It is elaborately carved on the inside with a decorated cartouche and a cherub-head. Casson called it the college's "most engaging" feature. The original gables over the front of the lodgings were removed and replaced with battlements between 1733 and 1740.

John Nash drew up plans to alter the lodgings in 1802. His plans were not used immediately (although other work was carried out at that time) but they were partly implemented in 1884 when a north wing was added, using Milton stone. This extension was later converted into general college accommodation. An oriel window on the west side of the lodgings, overlooking the second quadrangle, was also added in 1884. Much of the lodgings were refaced between 1927 and 1935, using Clipsham stone on the side facing the front quadrangle in place of the original Headington stone.

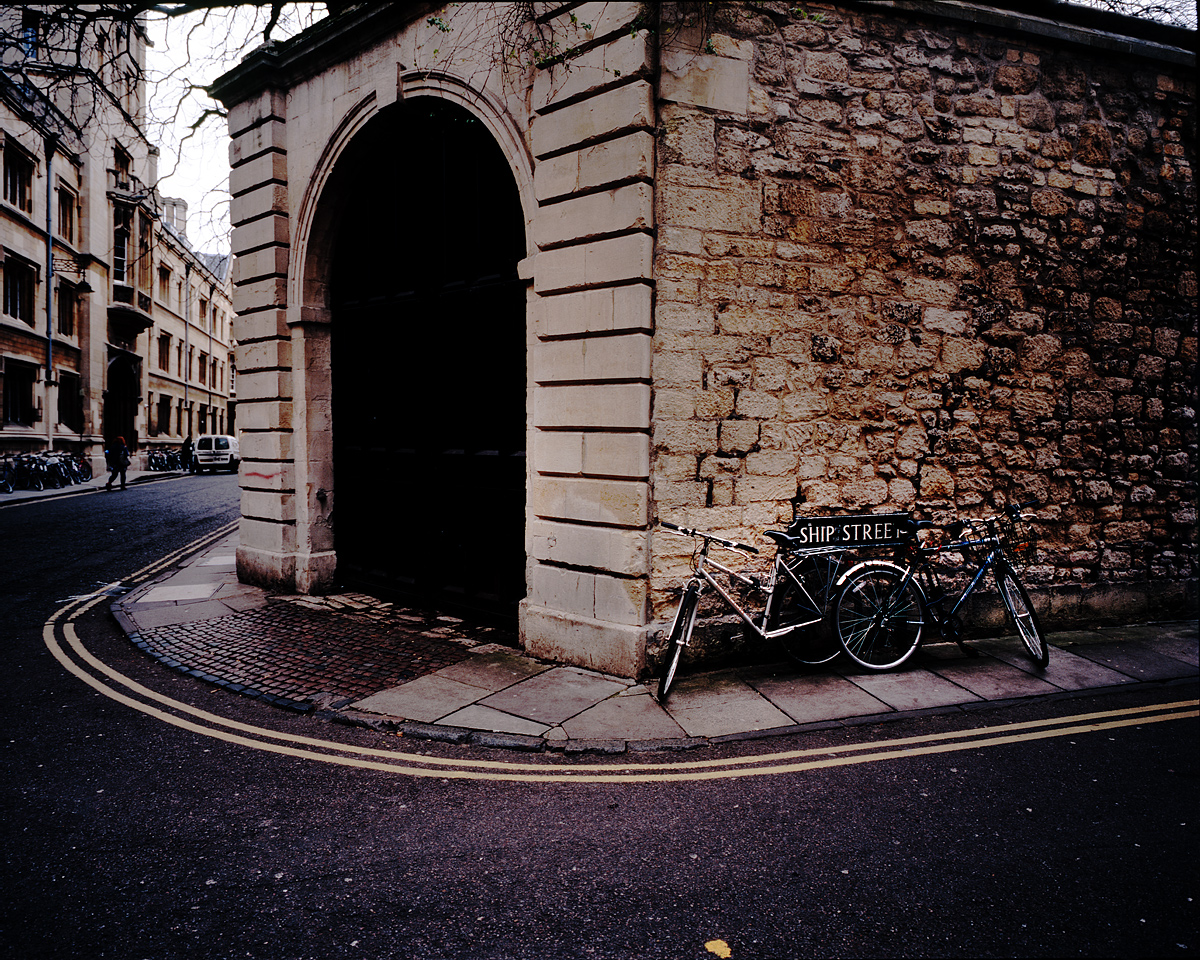
The gateway on the corner of Turl Street and Ship Street (1826)

In 1654, when Michael Roberts was principal, the college accounts record payment for construction of a ball court. This was to the west of the principal's garden (which is to the north of the lodgings, alongside Ship Street), between a privy, stables, and the wall of the garden. Ball courts, bowling greens and groves were often added within the precincts of colleges during the 17th century so that undergraduates could amuse themselves under the watchful eyes of their tutors, rather than indulge in forbidden pursuits such as drinking in alehouses. In 1757, principal Thomas Pardo added the area of the ball court to the garden of the lodgings and had a coach-house built there, which was reached from an entrance on the corner of Turl Street and Ship Street along a driveway across the north of the garden.

The garden and the ball court are depicted in David Loggan's 1675 engraving of the college, which shows an "attractive pleasure garden with box-edged paths and dense patterns of formal beds". In 1826, the garden was renovated and a Bath stone gateway installed on the corner of Turl Street and Ship Street. The size of the garden has been reduced at the west end by the 1884 extension to the lodgings (which was built on the area of the old ball court) and at the east end by the construction of a bicycle shed and garage. The boundary wall that runs from the north of the chapel along Turl Street and along Ship Street to the north of the garden is a Grade II listed building (a designation given to buildings of national importance and special interest).

=== Hall ===
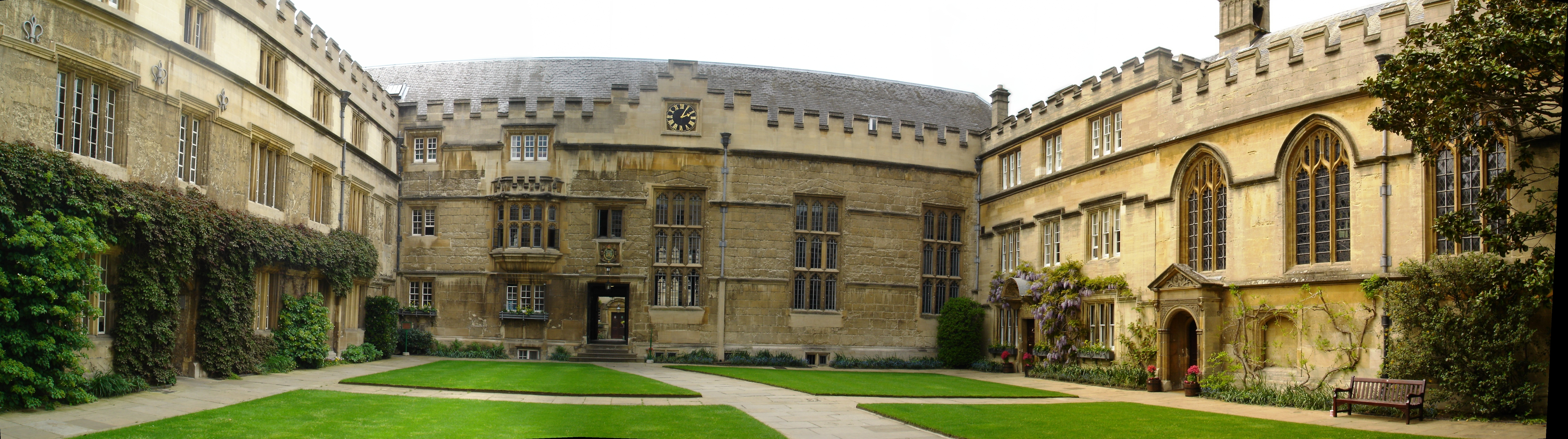
The first quadrangle, with the hall (centre), principal's lodgings and chapel (right)

The hall, like the chapel, was largely built by Griffith Powell between 1613 and 1620, and was finally completed soon after his death in 1620. The panelling, three tables and two benches date from Powell's time. It measures 54 by 25 feet (16.5 by 7.6 m) and is a Grade I listed building. The fireplace was set in an enclosed hearth with a large projecting chimney-breast, in contrast to the traditional method of heating the hall, which was by a brazier on an open hearth. A screen was installed in 1634 at a cost of £3 1s. (Note: £3 1s in 1634 would be worth approximately £7,550 in today's terms, adjusting for the growth in average earnings.) Pevsner noted the screen's "elaborately decorated columns" and the dragons along the frieze, and said that it was one of the earliest examples in Oxford of panelling using four "L" shapes around a centre. Norwich said that the dragons on the screen were "rather lovable", and Tyack said that they underlined the Welsh connections of the college: the red dragon is one of the national symbols of Wales. The stone steps from the first quadrangle to the hall were added in 1637. During the 17th century, changes were made to the interior of the hall. Windows painted with various coats of arms were removed and a bay window was added on the west side. Pevsner commented that "the hall windows themselves are different from all other 17th-century Gothic windows in Oxford except for the exactly contemporary hall bay-window of Exeter".

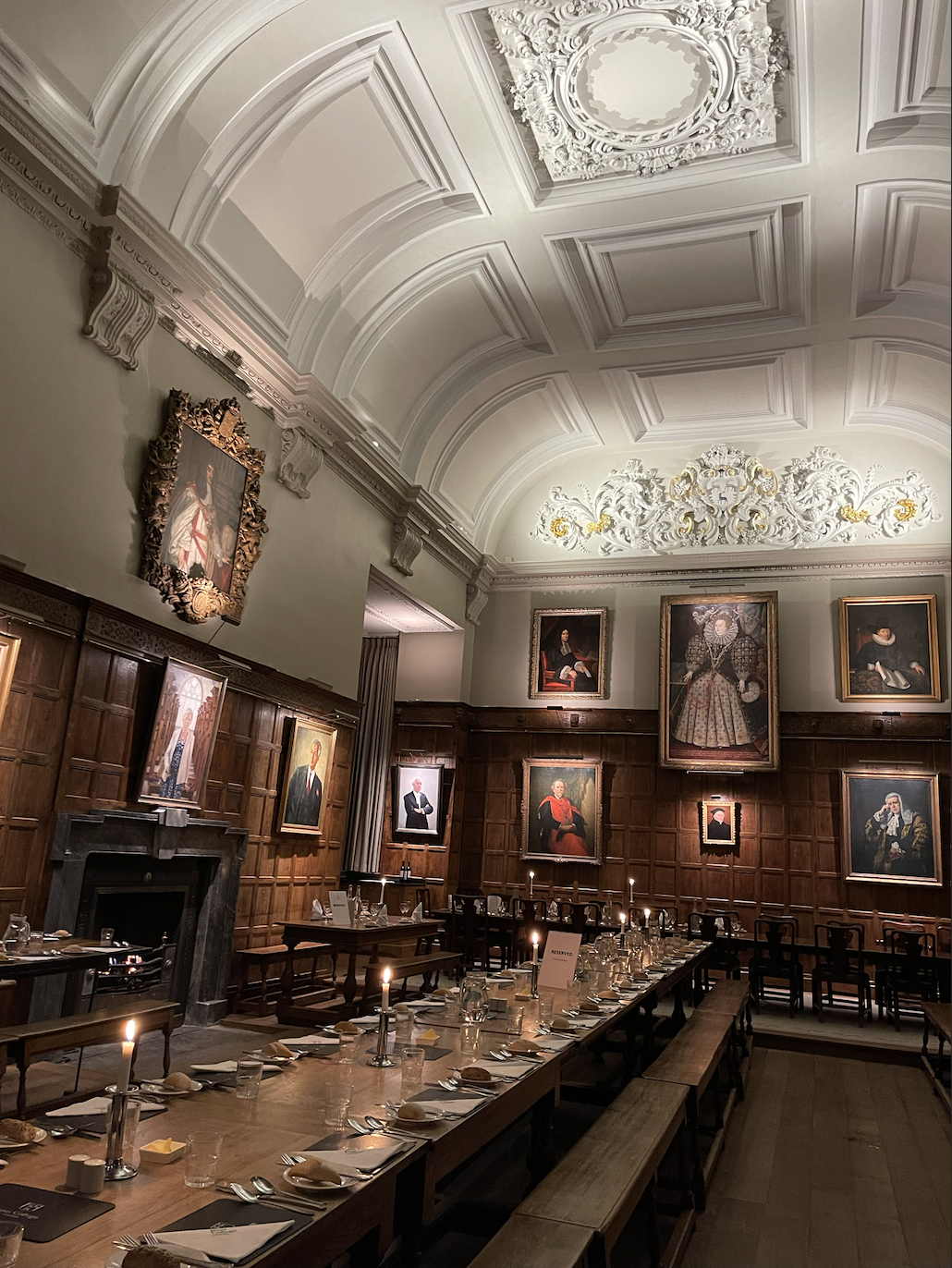
The hall, built c.1613–c.1621 with the plaster roof added c.1741

In 1741 and 1742, a total of £423 17s 4d (Note: £423 17s 4d in 1742 would be worth approximately £786,000 in today's terms, adjusting for the growth in average earnings.) was spent on the hall, which included the cost of covering the oak-beamed roof with plaster and making rooms in the original roof space. Writing in 1891, Llewellyn Thomas noted that the plaster roof was added to create attic rooms to increase the accommodation of the lodgings. He expressed the hope that the hall might soon regain its original proportions, following the enlargement of the lodgings a few years previously. This has not happened, and the plaster ceiling remains. However, in 2003, partitions between the rooms were knocked through to convert them into teaching rooms and the renovations enabled the upper part of the hall's hammerbeam roof to be seen from inside the rooms. Pevsner described the 1741 cartouche on the north wall, which contains the college crest, as "large [and] rich". Tyack noted the "lively Rococo plasterwork" of the flat ceiling. In the early 19th century the east and west sides of the hall were crenellated, and the roof was re-slated. A clock was installed on the external wall of the hall in 1831 by the principal Henry Foulkes. There is a college tradition that students aim a champagne cork at the clock after finishing their final university examinations; hitting it is supposed to mean that the student will obtain a first class honours degree. An extensive fire on 4 December 1913 threatened to destroy the hall before it was brought under control. In the rebuilding work that followed, a gallery was added to the hall, with the balustrade joining the 1634 screen. The hall contains a portrait of Elizabeth I, as well as portraits of former principals and benefactors. There are also portraits by court artists of two other monarchs who were college benefactors: Charles I (by Anthony van Dyck) and Charles II (by Sir Peter Lely). It has been said to be "among the most impressive of all the Oxford college halls", with its "fine panelling, austere ceiling, and its notable paintings".

== Second quadrangle ==
=== Expansion and the Civil War ===
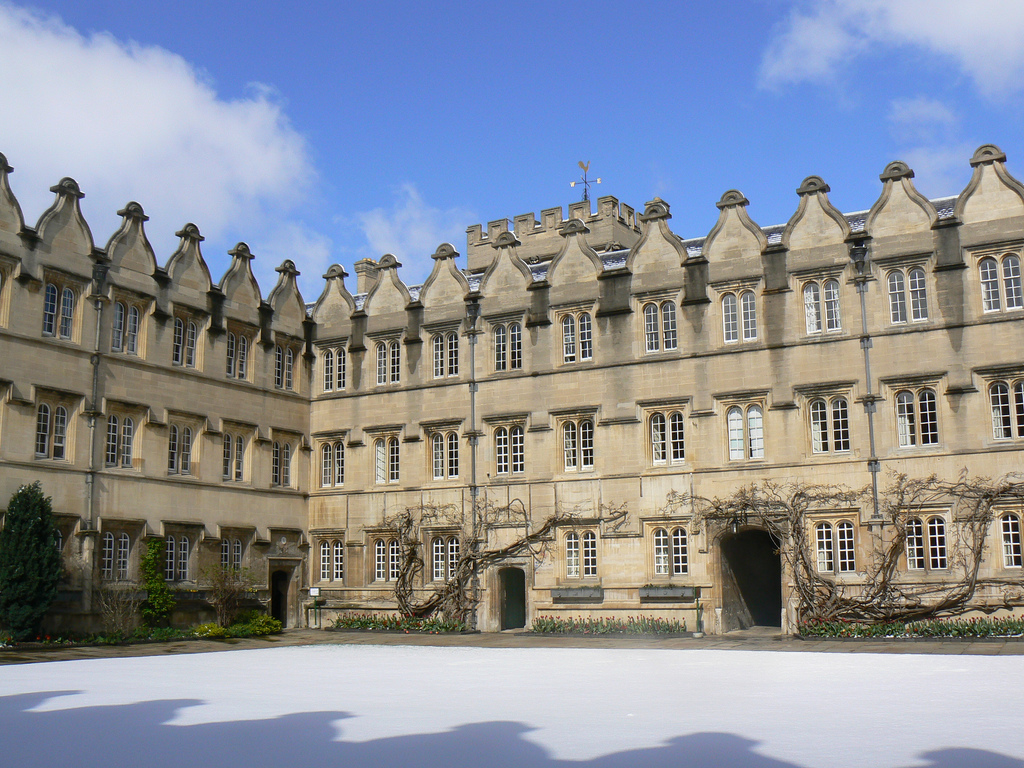
The corner of the north and west sides of the second quadrangle, with snow covering the grass

Francis Mansell, who was appointed principal in 1630, raised hundreds of pounds from donors towards the building of a second quadrangle in 1640. Buildings along part of the north and south sides were completed at this time, and in 1638 he purchased some land known as Coggan's Garden adjoining Market Street for £90, (Note: £90 in 1638 would be worth approximately £215,000 in today's terms, adjusting for the growth in average earnings.) upon which much of the west side of the second quadrangle was later built. The college also unsuccessfully proposed to the city council in 1638 that it should be permitted to expand to the north by closing Ship Street and purchasing the council's properties there. According to his successor and biographer, Sir Leoline Jenkins, Mansell had sufficient benefactors to be able to complete the quadrangle, including the construction of a library on the west side, but the outbreak of the English Civil War in 1641 put paid to his plans. Welsh tenants who supported Charles I refused to pay rent to the college after Michael Roberts was installed as principal in 1648 by the puritan regime, leaving the college "on the verge of financial collapse". Overall, the college was "reduced ... to administrative chaos" and in 1660 it was said to be in a "shatter'd condition", having suffered "a decade of corruption and internal strife quite unique in Oxford during the revolutionary period". The college obtained further land on Market Street in 1675, and building work began again in 1676. Sir Leoline Jenkins built the library on the west side, which was completed by 1679. After further land was obtained to link the Market Street and Ship Street sides of the college, further rooms, including what is now known as the Senior Common Room (SCR), were built at the instigation of Jonathan Edwards (principal from 1688 to 1712) to complete the inner quadrangle; the project was completed just after his death in 1712. Work to add a ceiling and wainscotting in the SCR took place in 1736, at a cost of £52 4s 5d, (Note: £52 4s 5d in 1736 would be worth approximately £94,500 in today's terms, adjusting for the growth in average earnings.) with the walls to the west of the college placed further back to enlarge the common room's garden and increase the light. Some minor work to repair and restore the walls has been carried out using Doulting stone.

The second quadrangle is larger than the first quadrangle, measuring 103 feet 6 inches by 94 feet 6 inches (31.55 by 28.80 m). The central plot of the quadrangle was filled with gravel from at least 1695; grass was laid in 1859. All four sides of the quadrangle are Grade I listed buildings. Pevsner described the second quadrangle as "a uniform composition", noting the "regular fenestration by windows with round-arched lights, their hood-moulds forming a continuous frieze". The Dutch gables have ogee sides and semi-circular pediments. Norwich described the second quadrangle as having "a strong feeling of unity owing to the somewhat relentless succession of ogival gables", adding that "One is grateful for the projecting bay, oriel, chimneybreast and clock on the east side for breaking the monotony". He pointed out that it was "almost a carbon copy" of the front quadrangle of University College, Oxford, which was begun in 1634: in describing University College, he wrote that "There are the same two-light windows, the same continuous rising and falling head-moulds on the three storeys, even the same oddly shaped gables" as in Jesus College. Tyack, too, said that the gables were "clearly influenced" by University College. The writer Simon Jenkins said that the quadrangle has "the familiar Oxford Tudor windows and decorative Dutch gables, crowding the skyline like Welsh dragons' teeth and lightened by exuberant flower boxes". Betjeman, describing the first and second quadrangles, said that they had "what look like Cotswold manors on all sides", adding that "The clearness of the planning of Jesus College and the relation of the heights of the buildings to the size of the quadrangles make what would be undistinguished buildings judged on their detail, into something distinguished". The 19th-century antiquarian Rowley Lascelles, however, described the ogee gables as "dismal" and called for them to be cut down into "battlements" (crenellations) to match those on the hall bay window; he went further, saying that "this whole College requires to be gothicised, as it is called; that is, mannered into the pointed style. It is a good subject for it". Casson said that the second quadrangle was "much the same mixture" as the first, but looked "a bit cramped and stiff".

=== Fellows' Library ===
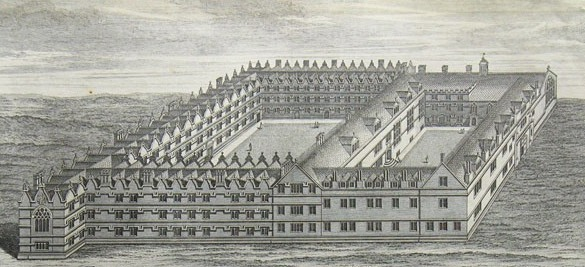
A view of the college from the south by George Vertue (1740), with the completed second quadrangle on the left and the first quadrangle on the right; the window in the bottom left corner is the south window of the Fellows' Library.

What is now called the Fellows' Library, on the west side of the second quadrangle, dates from 1679; it was built by Sir Leoline Jenkins (appointed principal in 1661), one of the project's donors. It replaced the college's first purpose-built library, built by Sir Eubule Thelwall to the west of the hall, in line with the lodgings, on the north side of what is now the college's second quadrangle. Until that time, the books had been kept in rooms above the kitchen and buttery. Thelwall's library appears to have been built over a covered walkway, with rooms for students above it. It fell into a "ruinous condition" and was pulled down by 1640 when Francis Mansell (principal since 1630) erected further buildings on the north and south sides of the quadrangle. After a long delay in building work caused by the effects of the civil war, the college purchased three properties on Market Street adjoining Coggan's Garden in 1675, and development of the south-west corner of the second quadrangle took place between 1676 and 1678 at a cost of £1,439 14s 13d. (Note: £1,439 14s 13d in 1613 would be worth approximately £4.2M in today's terms, adjusting for the growth in average earnings.)

The library, which is 65 feet (20 m) long and 21 feet 9 inches (6.63 m) wide, was built on the first floor of a free-standing building, above common rooms for students and fellows, and largely followed the layout of Thelwall's earlier library. The books were moved to their new location in 1679. The library contains bookcases dating from about 1628, which are decorated with strapwork and were used in the earlier library. The bookcases are 7 feet (2.1 m) long, with hinged desks. Some of the books were secured with chains; these were removed at an unknown date, although some payments for chains were made until 1765. A gallery storey was added, probably in 1691, and a wood-panelled gallery runs the length of the east side. It is reached by "an ingenious and graceful spiral staircase". On the west side of the library, there are nine windows on two levels; on the east side, there are now six on the lower level and four (blocked by gallery bookcases) on the upper level. The layout of the library, as well as the position of an exposed timber, suggests that there was previously a gallery on the west side. If so, it was not used after 1800, when the library was re-arranged. It may have been removed and transferred to St Edern's, Bodedern, along with some woodwork from the chapel after Street's renovations, with other sections of the chapel woodwork re-used in the east gallery – some of the carved patterns in the gallery are identical to those in Bodedern, and some of the gallery panels have been cut to fit their position, or are loose-fitting or upside down, suggestive of repositioning from a previous location.

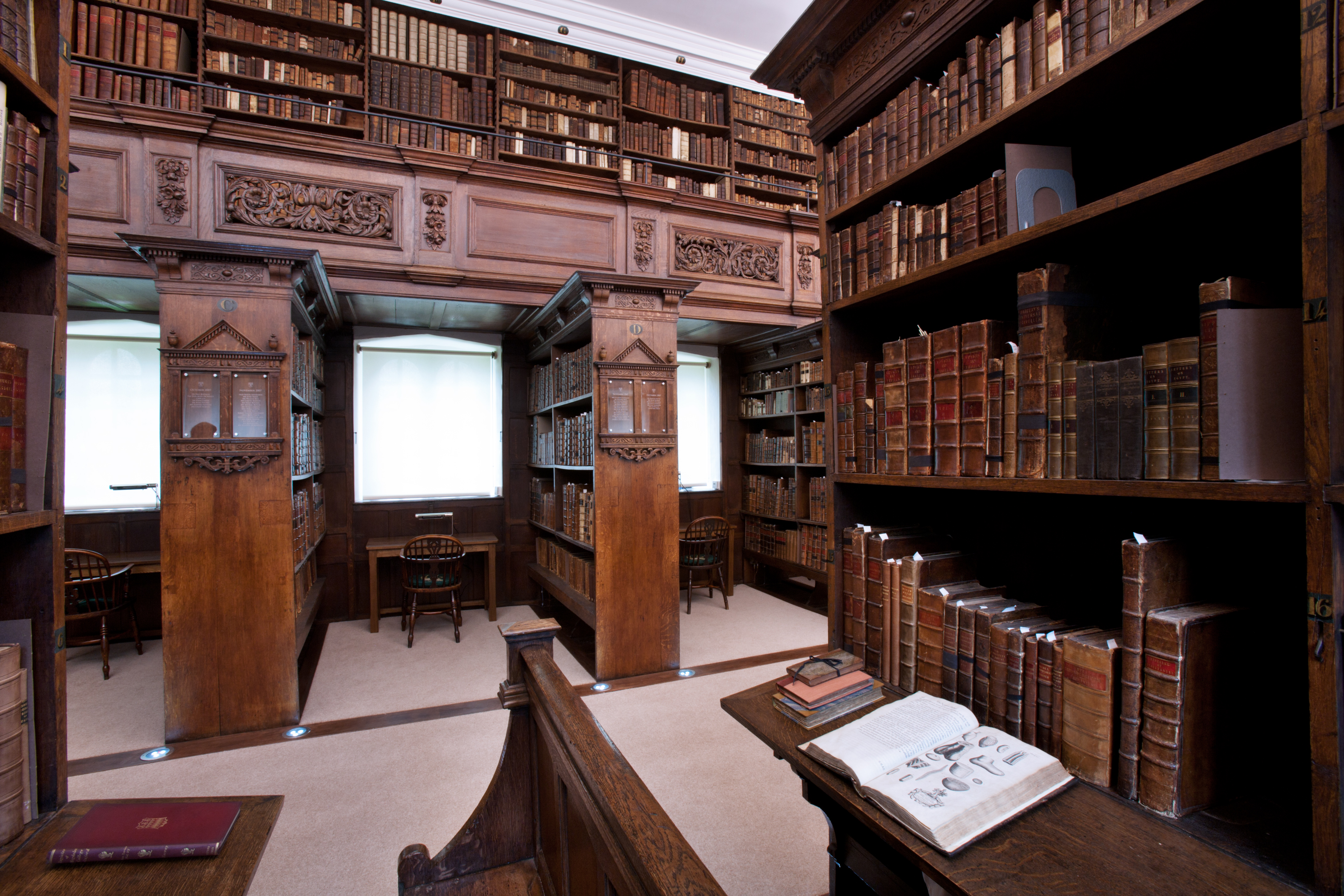
The interior of the library in 2010

Hardy's opinion was that, "if only it had an open timber roof instead of the plain ceiling, it would be one of the most picturesque College Libraries". Another author said (in 1914, after the provision of a library for undergraduates elsewhere in the quadrangle) that it was "one of the most charming of Oxford libraries, and one of the least frequented". The window at the south end has four lights; Pevsner noted that it was Gothic in style, despite the date of construction. Simon Jenkins said that the library is "a delight". Betjeman wrote in 1938 that "The woodwork, the brown leather of the books, the clear windows and the slim height of the room make it one of the best little-known sights of Oxford".

The library holds 11,000 antiquarian printed books and houses many of the college's rare texts, including a Greek bible dating from 1545 and signed by Philipp Melanchthon and others, much of the library of the scholar and philosopher Lord Herbert of Cherbury and 17th-century volumes by Robert Boyle and Sir Isaac Newton. The library also holds the undergraduate thesis of T. E. Lawrence ("Lawrence of Arabia"), entitled "The Influence of the Crusades on European Military Architecture to the end of XIIth Century". The college launched a restoration appeal in 2007 for work that was anticipated to cost £700,000. The roof was leaking, the floorboards had been affected by dry rot and death watch beetle, and new heating and ultra-violet light controls were needed to help preserve the books. The work to remedy these problems, and others, was completed in 2008.

== Third quadrangle ==
=== Expansion in the 20th century ===
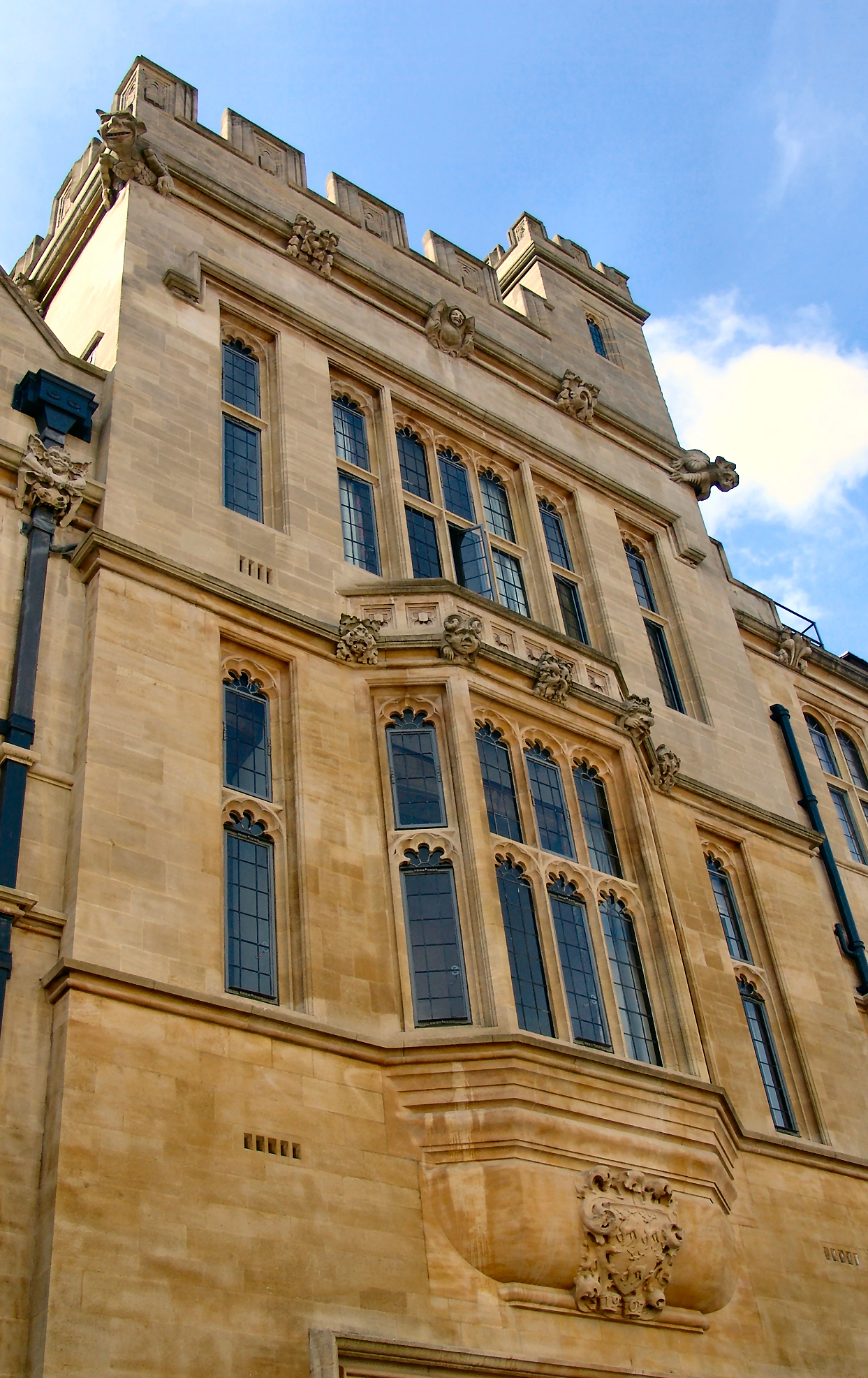
The tower over the Ship Street entrance (1907)

The long but narrow third quadrangle adjoins Ship Street, on the north of the site and to the west of the garden of the principal's lodgings, where the college has owned some land since its foundation. In the 18th century, this was home to the college stables. A fire in 1904 led to the demolition of the stables and the gateway to Ship Street. The fire also caused considerable damage to another building, about 80 metres (260 ft) long, owned by the college. The ground floor had been rented out to the Oxford Electric Light Company – the fire originated in their premises when cables overheated – and the first floor had been used as a carpenter's shop and a bookseller's stores. This building was also demolished, along with houses occupied by the college porter and the college butler. Some stones from the demolished building were used to build a house in Kennington, Oxfordshire.

Replacement buildings adjoining Ship Street, effectively creating a third quadrangle for the college, were constructed between 1906 and 1908. These were designed by the college architect and surveyor (Reuben England) and built in Doulting stone with Clipsham stone dressings, experience having shown that Doulting stone lasts longer when used in combination with a harder stone. The buildings, which have been given a Grade II listing, have been said to be keeping with the medieval look of the college as refaced by Buckler in the 19th century. However, Howell's description of England's work on Ship Street is that the design was "in an almost comically 'traditional' style", and Betjeman thought that the buildings were "dull". Casson described the third quadrangle as "a long, narrow court with a jumble of nineteenth- and twentieth-century buildings trying a bit too hard to be interesting". The extension cost £13,656. (Note: £13,656 in 1905 would be worth approximately £13.1M in today's terms, adjusting for changes in GDP.) It contained the college's science laboratories and a new gate-tower, as well as further living accommodation and a library for students, known as the Meyricke Library, after a major donor – there had been an undergraduate library in the second quadrangle since 1865, known as the Meyricke Library from 1882 onwards. A small block of toilets and bathrooms was also built in the third quadrangle in 1908; it was nicknamed the "fourth quad". Until then, students had had to use tin baths in their rooms to wash. It was not until 1946 that the college began to install baths and wash-basins on each staircase in the quadrangles. The "fourth quad" was demolished as part of the work to erect the Old Members' Building in 1971. The third quadrangle also contains the bar (in the basement beneath the library), the computer room, and student laundry facilities.

=== Laboratories ===
The laboratories, which were in use from 1907 to 1947, occupied three floors. They were overseen (for all but the last three years) by the physical chemist David Chapman, a college fellow from 1907 to 1944. At the time of their closure, they were the last college-based science laboratories at the university. They were named the Sir Leoline Jenkins laboratories, after the former principal of the college. The laboratories led to scientific research and tuition (particularly in chemistry) becoming an important part of the college's academic life. The brochure produced for the opening ceremony noted that the number of science students at the college had increased rapidly in recent years, and that provision of college laboratories would assist the tuition of undergraduates, as well as attracting to Jesus College graduates of the University of Wales who wished to continue their research at Oxford. The laboratories became unnecessary when the university began to provide centralised facilities for students; they were closed in 1947. The college then converted the laboratories (along with other rooms in the buildings adjoining Ship Street) into further accommodation for students and fellows, as well as relocating the Meyricke Library and providing a separate library for Celtic studies. The total cost was £25,000. (Note: £25,000 in 1947 would be worth approximately £4.5M in today's terms, adjusting for changes in GDP.)

=== Old Members' Building and Junior Common Room ===
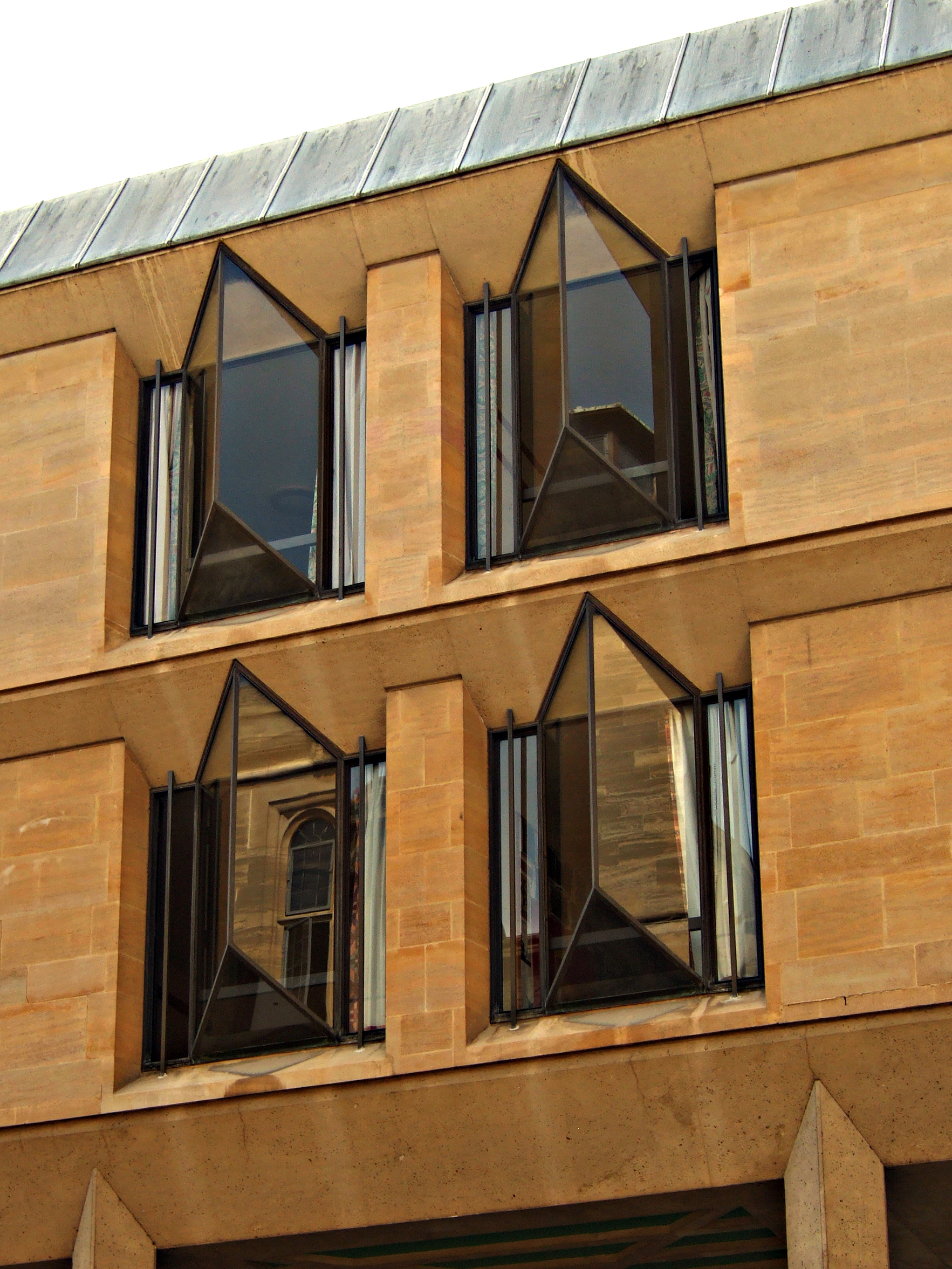
Part of the Old Members' Building (opened in 1971)

The Old Members' Building, which contains a music room, 24 study-bedrooms and some lecture rooms, was built between 1969 and 1971, and designed by John Fryman of the Architects' Design Partnership. It was built after a fundraising appeal to Old Members to mark the college's quatercentenary, and was opened by Charles, Prince of Wales, in 1971. When the plans for the building were being drawn up, the college stated that it was "prepared to sacrifice some accommodation to obtain a scheme of architectural merit". The result is a concrete building, faced with grit-blasted concrete and, as elsewhere in the third quadrangle, Clipsham limestone. Part of the ground floor is an extension at the rear of W. H. Smith on Cornmarket Street, and so access is at first-floor level. The windows, which project from the bedrooms in a V-shape, were said to have been intended to "reflect the intricacy of the older building", and to help improve the views from within.

Pevsner was critical of the use of canting in the design. He wrote that the entrance was reached by staircases set diagonally, which is "typical of the building", and that Fryman had "succumbed to the canting fashion of today: canted back, canted exposed supports on the entrance floor, canted base to the two upper floors". He called it a "mannered and modish design". Tyack referred to the building's "brutalism". Norwich said that it displays "an antipathy to the right-angle that makes the Front Quad look positively Pythagorean". Another reviewer, though, said that whilst the building tried too hard to be "Oxford" with "quirky and derivative details", the design made "ingenious use of minimal space" and filled a "drab" corner with "something lively and intimate"; overall, the review concluded, the virtues of the building overcame its faults.

A conference room, known as the Habakkuk Room after a former principal, was added in 1989. The Old Members' Building is connected by a bridge (Pevsner adding, "Of course it runs diagonally") to further college rooms above shops on Ship Street. These were added in 1908–1909 and were also designed by England. Pevsner noted the "four symmetrically grouped gables". There are also some student rooms above the shops in Cornmarket Street, some of which were refurbished in 2000.

In 2002, a two-year project to rebuild the property above the shops on Ship Street was completed. As part of the work, carried out by the architects Maguire & Co., the bottom floor was converted from rooms occupied by students and fellows into a new Junior Common Room (JCR), to replace the common room in the second quadrangle, which was by then too small to cope with the increased numbers of students. The new JCR, about twice the size of the previous one, can be partitioned into smaller rooms or kept open for large meetings; there is also a kitchen, a student committee room and a glazed conservatory extending onto the adjoining terrace. Above the JCR are three floors of new student rooms. The two rooms of the old JCR, each of which contain war memorials, have been converted into seminar and meeting rooms, and are now known as the Harold Wilson Room and the Memorial Room.

=== Fellows' Garden ===
The Fellows' Garden runs behind the west side of the second quadrangle, behind the SCR; it can be reached from there or from the third quadrangle. It dates from 1683, when 3s 6d (Note: 3s 6d in 1683 would be worth approximately £6,700 in today's terms, adjusting for the growth in average earnings.) was spent on making a garden; it would have been about 100 feet (30 m) long and between 10 and 20 feet (3.0 and 6.1 m) wide, but a further purchase of land in 1735 extended its length to about 170 feet (52 m). It is now overshadowed by adjoining buildings (including the Old Members' Building). Former college archivist, Brigid Allen, has described it as "a kind of gated tunnel between high buildings, paved, scattered with seats and tables, and filled with gloomy foliage of the purple-leaved plum".

== Fourth quadrangle ==
In 2019 work began on redevelopment of a commercial property, Northgate House, owned by the college on the corner of Cornmarket and Market Streets, to provide new student accommodation above retail facilities with a new quad and other teaching facilities behind according to a masterplan by MICA Architects, projected for completion to mark the college's 450th anniversary in 2021.

== Other buildings ==
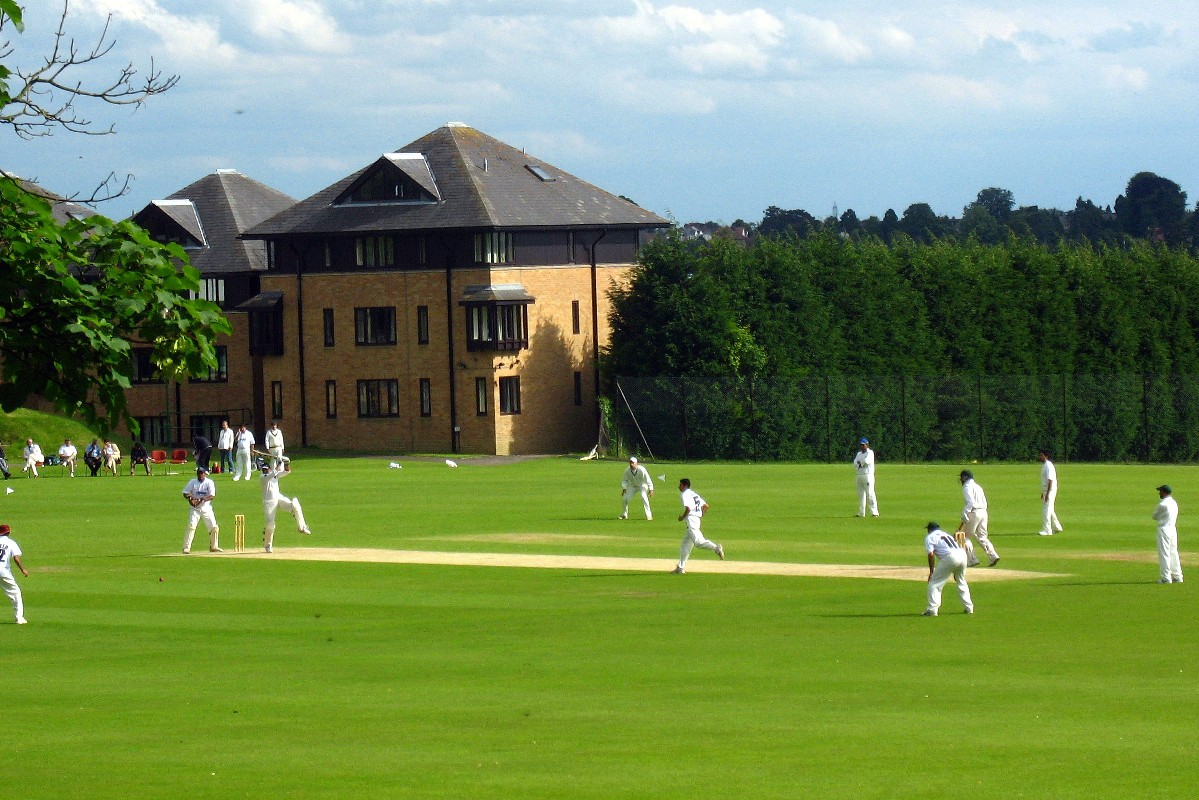
A cricket match in progress at the sports ground, with the two blocks of Hugh Price House in the background

The college purchased 10 acres (0.040 km^{2}; 0.016 sq mi) of land in east Oxford (near the Cowley Road) in 1903 for use as a sports ground. The 1905 pavilion was replaced in 1998 by a new pavilion on the opposite side of the sports ground; the old pavilion is now used as a table-tennis room (ground floor) with a three-bedroomed flat for graduates above. Residential accommodation was first built at the sports ground in 1967 (Thelwall House, rebuilt in 1998), with additions between 1988 and 1990 (Hugh Price House and Leoline Jenkins House). Writing in 1974, Pevsner said that Thelwall House was one of the recent college buildings that deserved note.

A further development, known as Hazel Court (after Alfred Hazel, principal 1925–1944), was built in 2000, bringing the total number of students who can be housed at the sports ground to 135. Writing in the Royal Institute of British Architects Journal in 2002, Jeremy Melvin praised the architects of Hazel Court, Maguire & Co., for their "crispness of detail" and "richness of composition"; he said that "the sense of ordered space ... recalls the way in which the traditional collegiate quads gave architectural expression to the then-new idea of a university". He noted that, whilst the first impression of the houses was Elizabethan with the air of a courtyard garden, "closer inspection reveals a contemporary design sensibility"; there was, he wrote, "the impression of an order that comes from making the construction explicit whils combining sensitivity to function and use". However, he commented that whilst there was plenty of space inside, the furniture "would not look out of place in a motorway hotel".

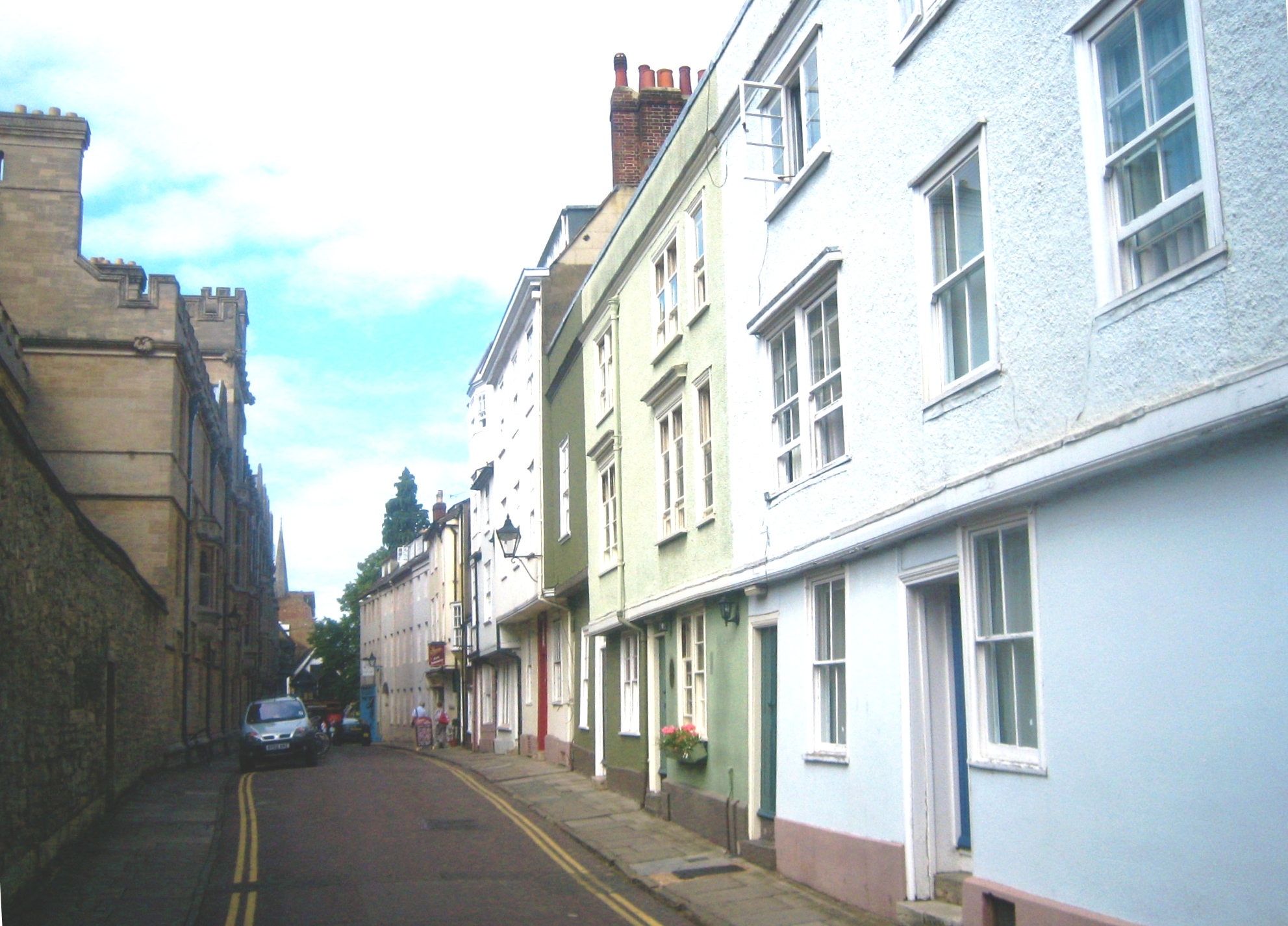
Houses on Ship Street

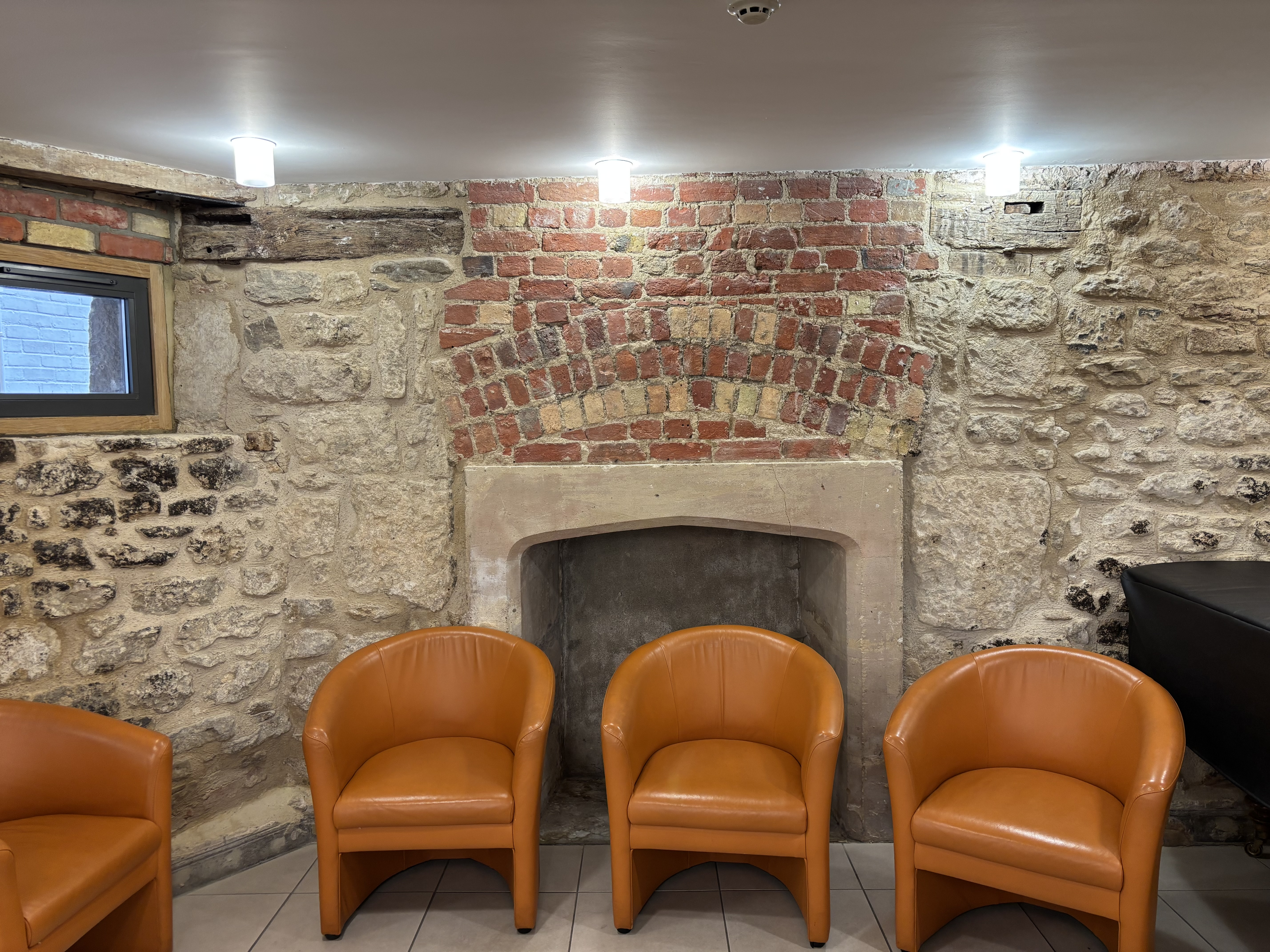
Bastion 4 of the Oxford City Wall forms part of the rear wall of the Ship Street Centre

Donations from Edwin Stevens, an Old Member of the college, enabled the construction in 1974 of student flats at a site in north Oxford on the Woodstock Road, named "Stevens Close" in his honour. The flats were opened by Elizabeth II in 1976. The college also owns a number of houses on Ship Street, which are used for student accommodation. It has purchased a further site in Ship Street at a cost of £1.8M, which will be converted at a projected cost of £5.5M to provide 31 student rooms with en-suite facilities, a 100-seat lecture theatre and other teaching rooms. The site includes a bastion from the Oxford city wall, which is a scheduled ancient monument. The plans provide for the inner curve of the bastion to be used as a featured alcove in the ground floor reception area and for study bedrooms on the upper floors. The Ship Street Centre was officially opened by the Chancellor of the University of Oxford, Chris Patten, on 25 September 2010.

== See also ==
- Buildings of Nuffield College, Oxford
- List of church restorations and alterations by G. E. Street

== Notes and references ==
=== Notes ===
Monetary values after 1830 are inflated to contemporary values using changes in the British Gross Domestic Product (GDP). This measures the social cost of construction or investment as a proportion of the economy's total output of goods and services. As GDP measures are not available prior to 1830, pre-1830 dates are inflated using changes in British (predominantly southern English) average wage labour earnings, this measures the social cost of dedicating labour to a particular project. Both of these measures allow a reader to consider the equivalent social impact in current terms: how much would contemporary Britons need to forgo in order to invest a similar amount of the current British economy. As of January 2017, the latest year for which contemporary figures are available is 2015.

=== Bibliography ===
- Airs, Malcolm (1982). The Buildings of Britain A Guide and Gazetteer, Tudor and Jacobean. London: Barrie & Jenkins. ISBN 978-0-09-147831-5.
- Allen, Brigid (1995–96). "Jesus College Library – 1628–1688". The Jesus College Record: 69–73. OCLC 316823249.
- Allen, Brigid (1998). "The Early History of Jesus College, Oxford 1571–1603" (PDF). Oxoniensia. LXIII: 105–124. ISSN 0308-5562.
- Allen, Brigid (1998–99). "The College Gardens before 1900". The Jesus College Record: 46–54.
- Allen, Brigid (2000). "The College Chapel, the Fellows' Library, and the woodwork mystery". The Jesus College Record: 59–69.
- Arkell, W. J. (1947). Oxford Stone. London: Faber and Faber. OCLC 876627.
- Baker, J. N. L. (1954). "Jesus College". In Salter, H. E.; Lobel, Mary D. (eds.). A History of the County of Oxford Volume III – The University of Oxford. Victoria County History. Institute of Historical Research, University of London. ISBN 978-0-7129-1064-4.
- Baker, J. N. L. (1971). Jesus College, Oxford 1571–1971. London: Oxonian Press Ltd. ISBN 978-0-9502164-0-9.
- Betjeman, Sir John (1979) [First published 1938]. An Oxford University Chest. Oxford University Press. ISBN 978-0-19-281273-5.
- Casson, Hugh (1988). Hugh Casson's Oxford. Oxford: Phaidon. ISBN 978-0-7148-2458-1.
- Fordyce, C. J.; Knox, T. M. (1937). "The Library of Jesus College, Oxford". Oxford Bibliographical Society Proceedings and Papers. V. Part II: 53–74. OCLC 230708796.
- Hardy, E. G. (1899). Jesus College. London: F. E. Robinson & Co. OCLC 7961179.
- Lascelles, Rowley (1821). "Jesus College". The university and city of Oxford displayed in a series of seventy-two views. London: Sherwood, Neely, and Jones. OCLC 9735212. Pages in the original are not numbered; the page references provided are to the "read online" version at www.archive.org.
- Long, Derek (1995–96). "Sir Leoline Jenkins Laboratories 1907–47". The Jesus College Record: 46–57.
- Norwich, John Julius (1985). The Architecture of Southern England. Macmillan. ISBN 978-0-333-22037-5.
- Pevsner, Nikolaus; Sherwood, Jennifer (1974). "Jesus College". The Buildings of England – Oxfordshire. Yale University Press. ISBN 978-0-300-09639-2.
- Royal Commission on the Historical Monuments of England (1939). An Inventory of the Historical Monuments in the City of Oxford. London: Her Majesty's Stationery Office. OCLC 484745.
- Thomas, Llewellyn (1891). "Jesus College". In Clark, Andrew (ed.). The colleges of Oxford: their history and traditions. London: Methuen & Co. pp. 364–388. OCLC 5249936.
- Tyack, Geoffrey (1998). Oxford: an architectural guide. Oxford University Press. ISBN 978-0-19-817423-3.
- Tyacke, Nicholas, ed. (October 1997). The History of the University of Oxford Volume IV: Seventeenth-Century Oxford. Oxford University Press. ISBN 978-0-19-951014-6.
