= George Hedgeland =

Stained glass designer

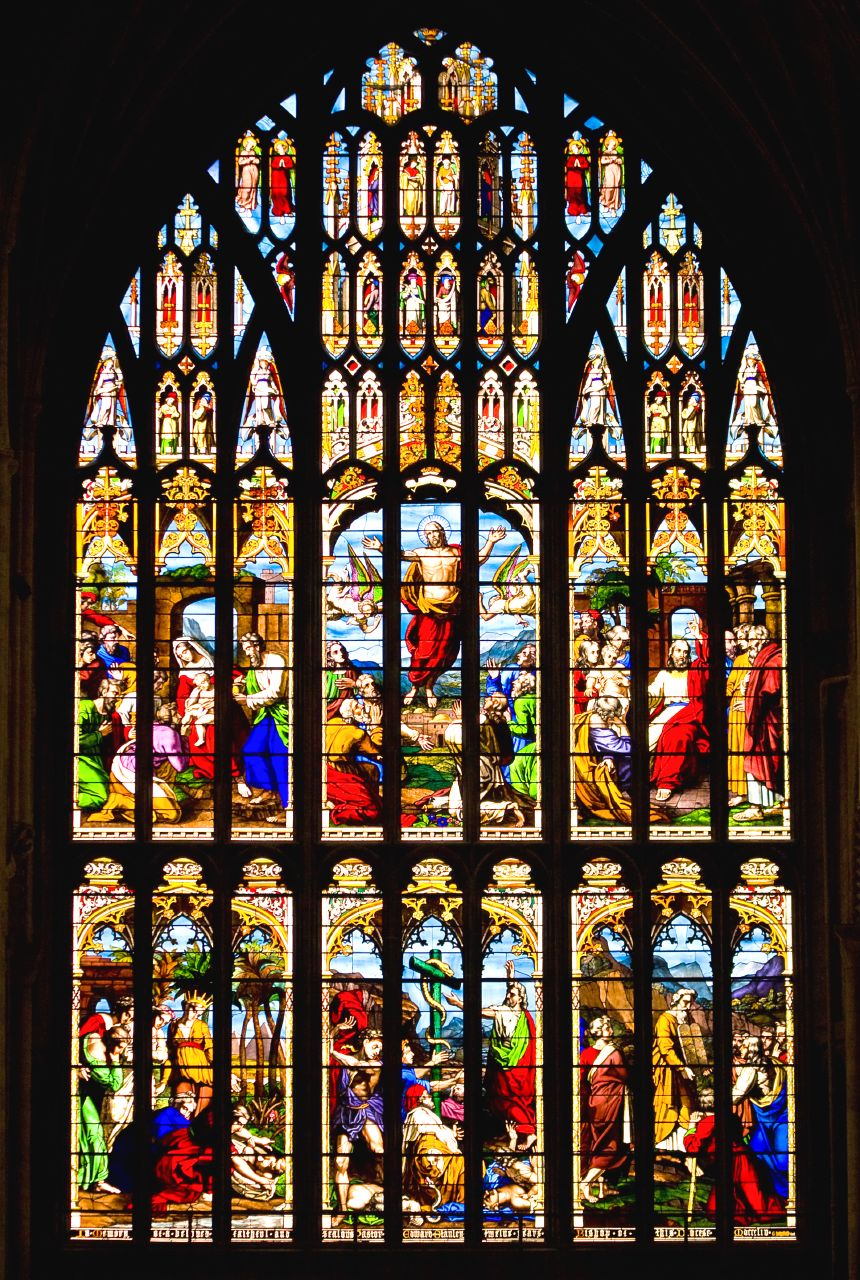
Hedgeland's west window at Norwich Cathedral

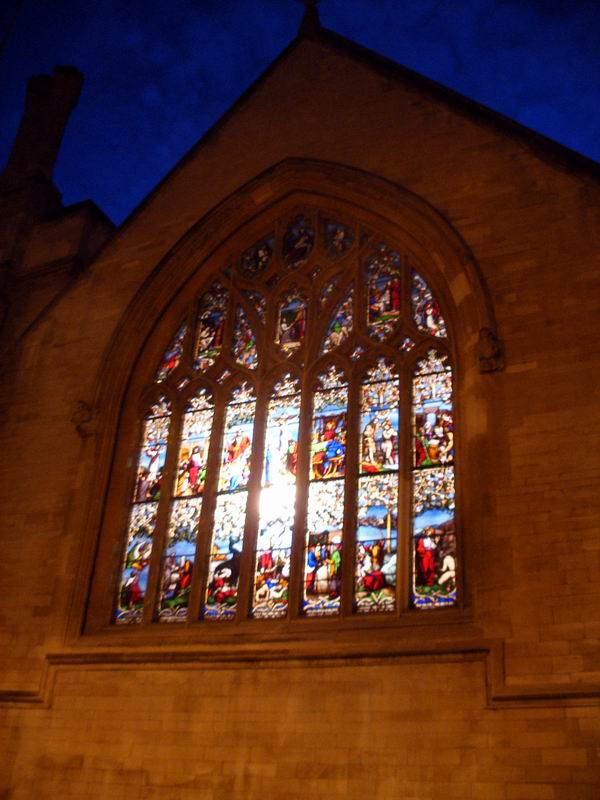
The east window at Jesus College, Oxford

George Caleb Hedgeland (1825–1898) was a British designer of stained glass windows in the 19th century. He was the son of the architect John Pike Hedgeland and worked from a studio in London in the 1850s. His work, which was displayed at the Great Exhibition in 1851, was characterised by the use of bold designs. His career was short, as ill-health led to a move to Australia in 1860.

In Australia, Hedgeland worked as a surveyor in New South Wales from 1871.

== Works ==
His work included:

- An east window for the chapel of Jesus College, Oxford (1853) This shows various biblical episodes, including three instances of Christ raising people from the dead: Jairus' daughter, the son of the widow of Nain and Lazarus. There are also pairs of scenes from the New Testament and the Old Testament to demonstrate the typological relationship between them: for example, the Passover is paired with the Last Supper, Jonah escaping from the whale with the Resurrection of Jesus, and the ascension of Elijah with the ascension of Jesus. Nikolaus Pevsner described it as "a busy, somewhat gloomy piece with many small scenes".
- The west window of Norwich Cathedral (1853), similarly depicts the typological relationship between Moses, his birth, teachings and saving people with a snake on a pole and Jesus' birth, teachings and ascension (pictured).
- The east window of St John's Church, Sharow, North Yorkshire
- Halifax Parish Church (1855)
- South-east transept window at Lincoln Cathedral (1854)
- A window at Ely Cathedral
- Restoration of windows at King's College, Cambridge

== Personal ==
Hedgeland married Annie Shrapnell Henning, sister of Rachel Henning, at St Mark's, Darling Point on 24 January 1866.

He died of influenza on 28 September 1898 at Ryde and was buried at Field of Mars Cemetery, Ryde.
