= Rowley Lascelles =

Rowley Lascelles (1771 – 19 March 1841) was an English antiquarian and archivist.

== Life ==
Lascelles was born in Westminster, London in 1771, and studied at Harrow School before qualifying as a barrister; he was a member of Middle Temple in London and the King's Inns in Dublin, and practised in Ireland for about twenty years. He was appointed to edit documents relating to the Irish court of chancery by the records commissioners for Ireland, but when it was published (volume 1 in 1824, volume 2 in 1830), his "partisan tone gave so much offence that... it was practically suppressed", and he was not paid the full amount of the fees for which he claimed, despite petitioning the House of Commons twice. He died on 19 March 1841.

== Works ==
Lascelles's major work was Liber munerum publicorum Hiberniae, published in 1852 after his death, with a preface by Francis Sheppard Thomas. An index to the work was published in 1877.

A number of articles in the Gentleman's Magazine, under the pseudonym "Yorick", have been attributed to Lascelles.
