= Hugh Price (lawyer) =

Welsh lawyer and clergyman, founder of Jesus College, Oxford

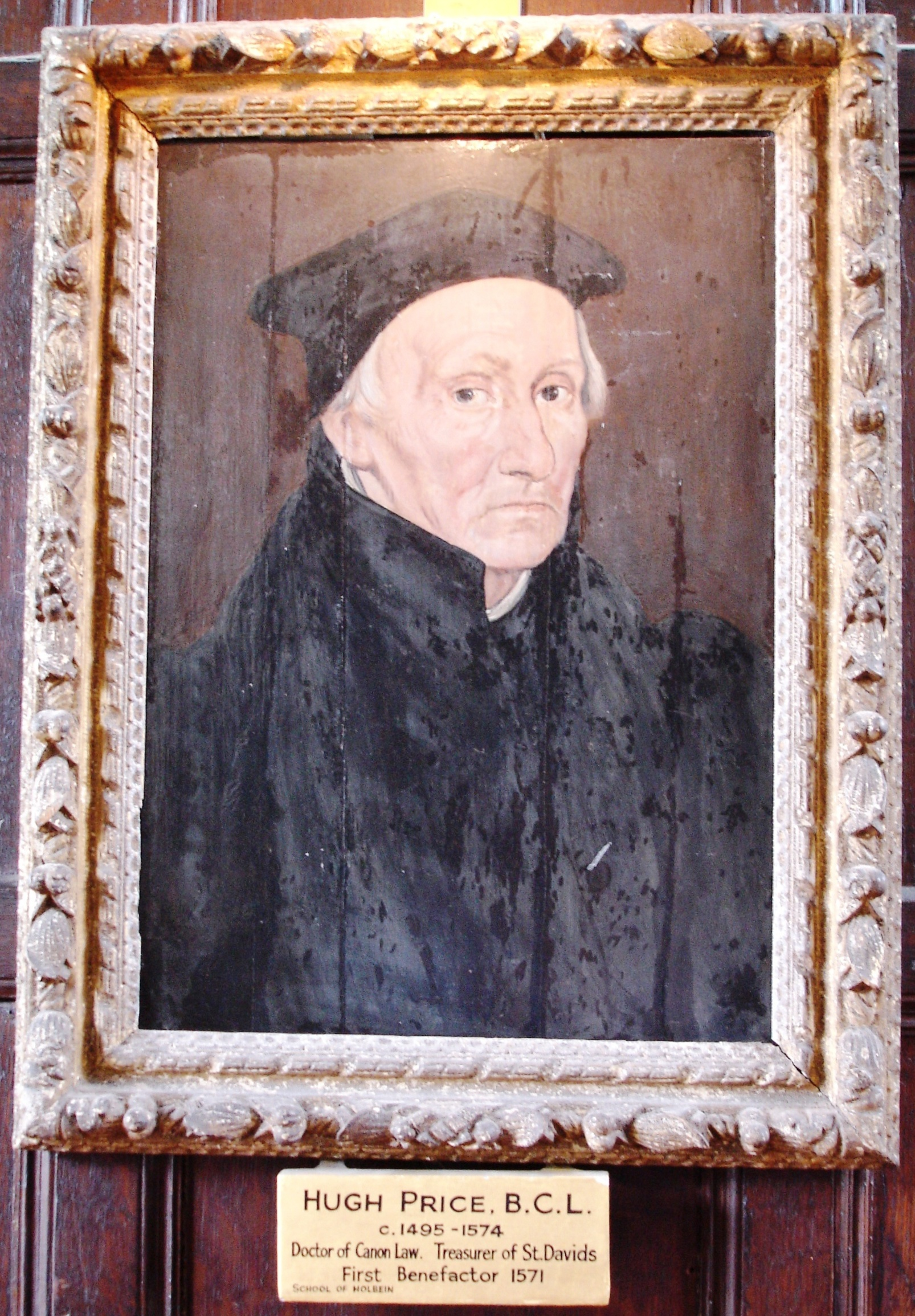
Hugh Price's portrait in the hall of Jesus College, Oxford

Hugh Price (c. 1495 – 1574) was a Welsh lawyer and Anglican clergyman who was instrumental in the founding of Jesus College, Oxford.

== Biography ==
Price was born in Brecon, in mid-Wales, the son of a butcher named Rhys ap Rhys. He began his education either in Brecon or at Osney Abbey near Oxford. In any event he went on to study at the University of Oxford, receiving the degrees of BCL (Bachelor of Civil Law), BCnL (Bachelor of Canon Law) and DCnL (Doctor of Canon Law), completing the last of these in 1526.

He was one of a group of judges who condemned James Bainham to death for heresy in 1532. He was later to become treasurer of St. David's Cathedral and prebendary of Rochester Cathedral, receiving both appointments in 1541. However, he does not seem to have spent much time in either of these locations, retaining a house in Brecon where he was recorded as bailiff in 1572.

In 1571 Price petitioned Elizabeth I to formally establish Jesus College, Oxford. Price provided some funds for work on the college's construction, though only part of one quadrangle was completed in his lifetime. On his death he left the college 100 marks and his books. A promised benefaction worth £60 a year was provided on the condition "that I remained Founder of the same College" — an important point since the Queen had claimed that title for herself in providing letters patent for the college.

A small portrait of Price hangs behind High Table in the hall of Jesus College, and is attributed to the school of Hans Holbein the Younger.
