= Ernest Hardy =

Classicist and Principal of Jesus College, Oxford (1852-1925)

Ernest George Hardy (15 January 1852 – 26 October 1925) was a classicist and Principal of Jesus College, Oxford, from 1921 to 1925.

== Biography ==
Hardy was born in Hampstead, England and was educated at Highgate School. He then went to Exeter College, Oxford, from 1871 to 1875, where he was a scholar and achieved a double-first in Literae Humaniores. He was elected a Fellow of Jesus College in 1875. He resigned in 1878 (after his marriage). He taught at Felsted School for two years and was headmaster of The King's School, Grantham (1879–87), where he met Frederick Rolfe, then an undermaster at the school. He resigned following a struggle with the governors, and moved back to Oxford where he carried out private research.

He taught classics at Jesus College from 1894 (after David Ritchie was appointed to a professorship at the University of St Andrews) and he was re-elected to a Fellowship at Jesus College in 1896. He became Vice-Principal in 1897 and wrote a history of the college in 1899. He remained a long-term friend of Frederick Rolfe, and in 1904 wrote a letter commending Rolfe which is reprinted in Symons' biographical study of Rolfe. After Sir John Rhys died in 1915, the Principalship was vacant until 1921, when Hardy was elected. He died suddenly in 1925, three weeks after presiding at the first College Gaudy since 1914.

== Works ==
- The Provincial Concilia From Augustus to Diocletian (London: Longman, Green, and Co., 1890)
- Christianity and the Roman Government: a Study in Imperial Administration (London: Longman, Green & Co., 1894)
- Jesus College (London: F. E. Robinson, 1899)
- Studies in Roman History (London: Swan Sonnenschein, 1906)
- Six Roman Laws (Oxford: Clarendon Press, 1911)
- Roman Laws and Charters (Oxford: Clarendon Press, 1912)
- Some Problems in Roman History: Ten Essays Bearing on the Administrative and Legislative Work of Julius Caesar (Oxford: Clarendon Press, 1924)
- The Catilinarian Conspiracy in its Context: a Re-study of the Evidence (Oxford: Basil Blackwell, 1924)
