= J. N. L. Baker =

John Norman Leonard Baker (generally known as J. N. L. B.; 12 December 1893 – 16 December 1971) was a geographer associated with Jesus College, Oxford for nearly sixty years.

== Biography ==
Born in Liverpool, Baker studied at Liverpool College from 1911 to 1913 before entering Jesus College as an exhibitioner in 1913, where he read Modern History. His undergraduate career was interrupted by the First World War, during which he was wounded on the Somme. He married Phyllis Hancock in 1917 whilst convalescing. He then spent two years in the Indian Army (1918–19). He returned to Oxford and completed his history degree in 1920 before switching to geography (an interest in which had been prompted by his service in India). He obtained the diploma in geography (with distinction) in 1921 and a B.Litt. in 1922. From 1922 to 1923 he was a lecturer at Bedford College, London before being appointed as a member of staff of the Oxford University School of Geography. He was initially assistant to the Reader and librarian, before becoming a lecturer in 1927 and reader in 1933. He was influential in the arrangements for the creation of the geography undergraduate degree at Oxford, which started in 1932, and was disappointed not to be appointed professor (the post going to Kenneth Mason).

Baker's particular interest was the history of geography and exploration; he was appointed Reader in Historical Geography in 1935. His book, A History of Geographical Discovery and Exploration became the standard work in its field. He was a council member of the Royal Geographical Society, winning the society's Victoria Medal in 1964 for his "contributions to the history of geography." He was also a founder member (and later president) of the Institute of British Geographers, which broke away from the RGS in 1933. He was also a member of the Hakluyt Society from 1924 onwards, serving as president between 1955 and 1960. He was also involved with Section E (Geography) of the British Association for the Advancement of Science and was Section President in 1955.

Baker was appointed as a college Lecturer in Geography by Jesus College in 1932 and, in 1939, was appointed Senior Bursar and Fellow. He worked in intelligence matters during the Second World War. Thereafter he increasingly spent time on his college duties, resigning his readership in 1947 (though he continued to lecture). He remained as bursar until 1962, when he retired. He wrote about the history of Jesus College for the Victoria County History volume on the history of the University of Oxford. He also wrote Jesus College 1571–1971 to mark the college's quatercentenary. Baker is commemorated at Jesus College through an annual prize for geography students and in the name of the college geography society.

Baker was also an active member in the civic affairs of Oxford, drawing on his abilities as a bursar for matters of city finance and on his geographical knowledge for matters of town planning. He was first elected a university member of the City Council in 1945. He became an alderman in 1963 and, in 1964–65, he was Lord Mayor of Oxford, the first university member to hold this post. His elder daughter Janet (who married Geoffrey Young, a Fellow at Baker's college, and was later created Baroness Young) was a City Councillor alongside Baker. She became Leader of the council in 1967, the year that Baker's time on the council ended.
