= Michael Roberts (college principal) =

Michael Roberts (died 3 May 1679) was Principal of Jesus College, Oxford, from 1648 to 1657.

== Life ==
Roberts came from the parish of Llanffinan in Anglesey, Wales, but his date of birth is uncertain. He graduated with a BA from Trinity College, Dublin in 1620 (MA 1623) and was incorporated at Oxford and Cambridge in 1624. He became a Fellow of Jesus College in 1625, but lost his fellowship in 1637 for failing to take his DD.

In 1648, during the Parliamentary visitation of the University of Oxford, Francis Mansell was ejected from his position as Principal. Roberts was appointed in his place. He was removed by the Fellows in 1655, but was reinstated by the Visitors in 1656, before resigning in 1657. His period as Principal was turbulent. One biographer wrote that "For nine years the college became a hornet's nest. The dormant Royalists among the Fellows looked upon him as a traitor to their cause; the Puritan faction deemed him a hypocrite."
