= Griffith Lloyd =

British academic administrator (died 1586)

Griffith Lloyd (died 1586) was Principal of Jesus College, Oxford, from 1572 to 1586. He was also Regius Professor of Civil Law from 1577 to his death.

He was originally from Lampeter, Wales where the Lloyds of Maesyfelin were a well-respected family. He was one of the first benefactors to leave land to the college, with his bequest of some land in Cardiganshire taking effect after his widow's death in 1615.
