= List of mathematicians, physicians, and scientists educated at Jesus College, Oxford =

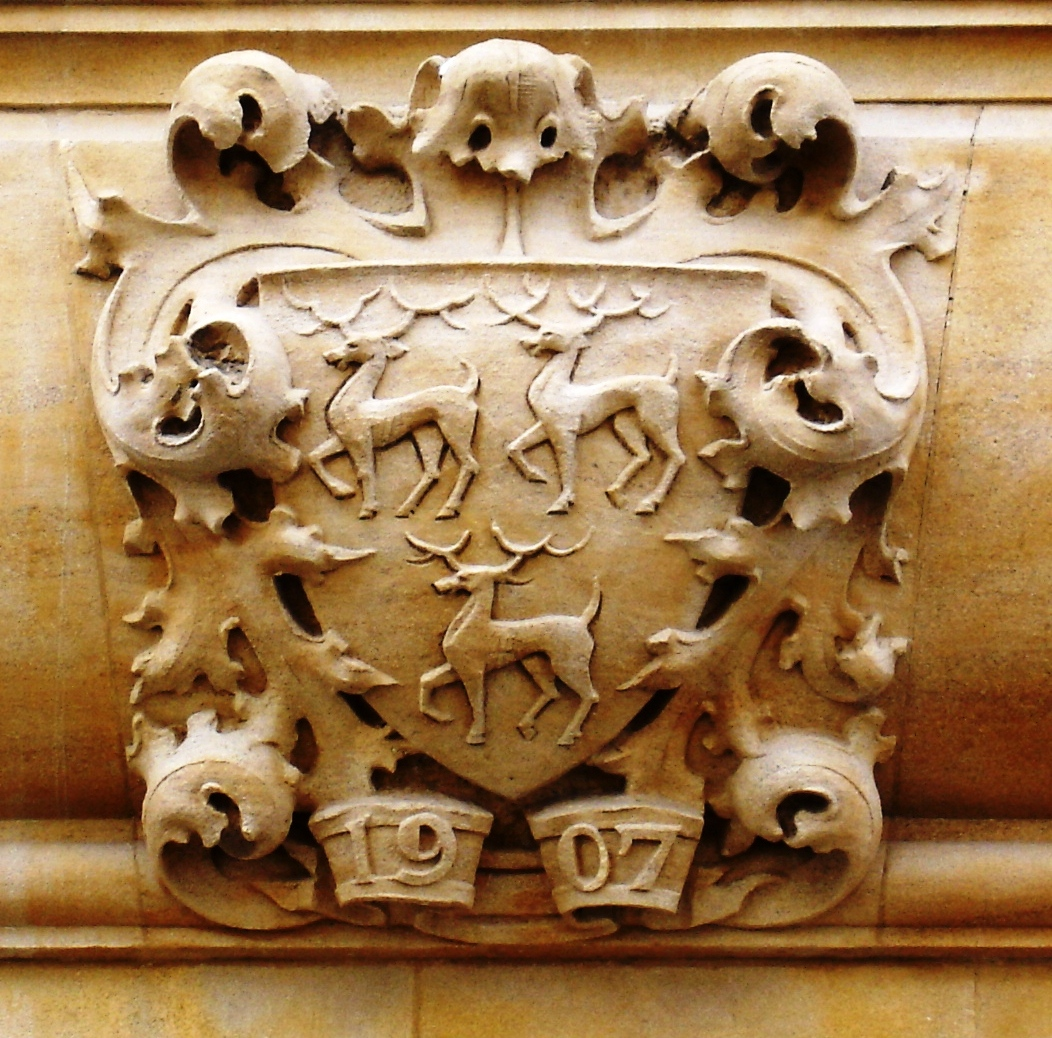
The crest of Jesus College above the entrance on Ship Street

Jesus College is one of the constituent colleges of the University of Oxford in England. The college was founded in 1571 by Queen Elizabeth I at the request of Hugh Price, a Welsh clergyman, who was Treasurer of St David's Cathedral in Pembrokeshire. The college still has strong links with Wales, and about 15% of students are Welsh. There are 340 undergraduates and 190 students carrying out postgraduate studies. Women have been admitted since 1974, when the college was one of the first five men's colleges to become co-educational. Old members of Jesus College are sometimes known as "Jesubites".

Mathematicians who have studied at Jesus College include Nigel Hitchin (Savilian Professor of Geometry at Oxford 1997–2016), Jonathan Borwein (a former Rhodes Scholar who has held professorial appointments in Canada and Australia), and Jim Mauldon (who taught at Oxford before moving to the United States to teach at Amherst College in Massachusetts). David E. Evans is Professor of Mathematics at Cardiff University, and H. W. Lloyd Tanner was Professor of Mathematics and Astronomy at one of its predecessor institutions, the University College of South Wales and Monmouthshire. Several noted individuals from biology, botany and zoology were educated at the college, including the Welsh clergyman Hugh Davies (whose Welsh Botanology of 1813 was the first publication to cross-reference the Welsh-language and the scientific names of plants), Edward Bagnall Poulton (Professor of Zoology at Oxford) and James Brontë Gatenby (Professor of Zoology at Trinity College, Dublin). Frank Greenaway was Keeper of the Department of Chemistry at the Science Museum in London for over 20 years, and the physicist Chris Rapley was director of the museum 2007–2010. Other physicists who are Old Members of the college include Michael Woolfson (a former professor of physics at the University of York) and Edward Hinds (whose work on ultra-cold matter won him the Rumford Medal of the Royal Society in 2008). Edwin Stevens, who studied Natural Science at the college, designed the world's first wearable hearing aid, and Sir Graham Sutton became director-general of the Meteorological Office ('Met Office').

The college had its own science laboratories from 1907 to 1947, which were overseen (for all but the last three years) by the physical chemist David Chapman, a Fellow of the college from 1907 to 1944. At the time of their closure, they were the last college-based science laboratories at the university. They were named the Sir Leoline Jenkins laboratories, after a former principal of the college. Scientific research and tuition (particularly in chemistry) became an important part of the college's academic life after the construction of the laboratories. The brochure produced for the opening ceremony noted that the number of science students at the college had increased rapidly in recent years, and that provision of college laboratories would assist the tuition of undergraduates, as well as attracting to Jesus College those graduates of the University of Wales who wished to continue their research at Oxford. One of the college science lecturers had a link with Imperial Chemical Industries (ICI); 17 students joined ICI between the two World Wars, some of whom (such as John Rose) reached senior levels in the company. The laboratories became unnecessary when the university began to provide centralised facilities for students, and they were closed in 1947.

== Alumni ==
Abbreviations used in the following tables

- M – Year of matriculation at Jesus College (a dash indicates that the individual did not matriculate at the college)
- G – Year of graduation / conclusion of study at Jesus College (a dash indicates that the individual moved to another college before graduating or concluding studies)
- DNG – Did not graduate: left the college without obtaining a degree
- ? – Year unknown; approximate year used for table-sorting purposes
- (F) – later became a Fellow of Jesus College, and included on the list of Principals and Fellows
- (HF) – later became an Honorary Fellow of Jesus College, and included on the list of Honorary Fellows

Degree abbreviations

- Undergraduate degree: BA – Bachelor of Arts
- Postgraduate degrees:

- BSc – Bachelor of Science
- DPhil – Doctor of Philosophy
- MA – Master of Arts
- MB – Bachelor of Medicine
- MD – Doctor of Medicine
- MPhil – Master of Philosophy
- MSc – Master of Science

The subject studied and the degree classification are included, where known. Until the early 19th century, undergraduates read for a Bachelor of Arts degree that included study of Latin and Greek texts, mathematics, geometry, philosophy and theology. Individual subjects at undergraduate level were only introduced later: for example, Mathematics (1805), Natural Science (1850), Jurisprudence (1851, although it had been available before this to students who obtained special permission), Modern History (1851) and Theology (1871). Geography and Modern Languages were introduced in the 20th century. Music had been taught as a specialist subject, rather than being part of the BA course, before these changes; medicine was studied as a post-graduate subject.

=== Mathematicians ===
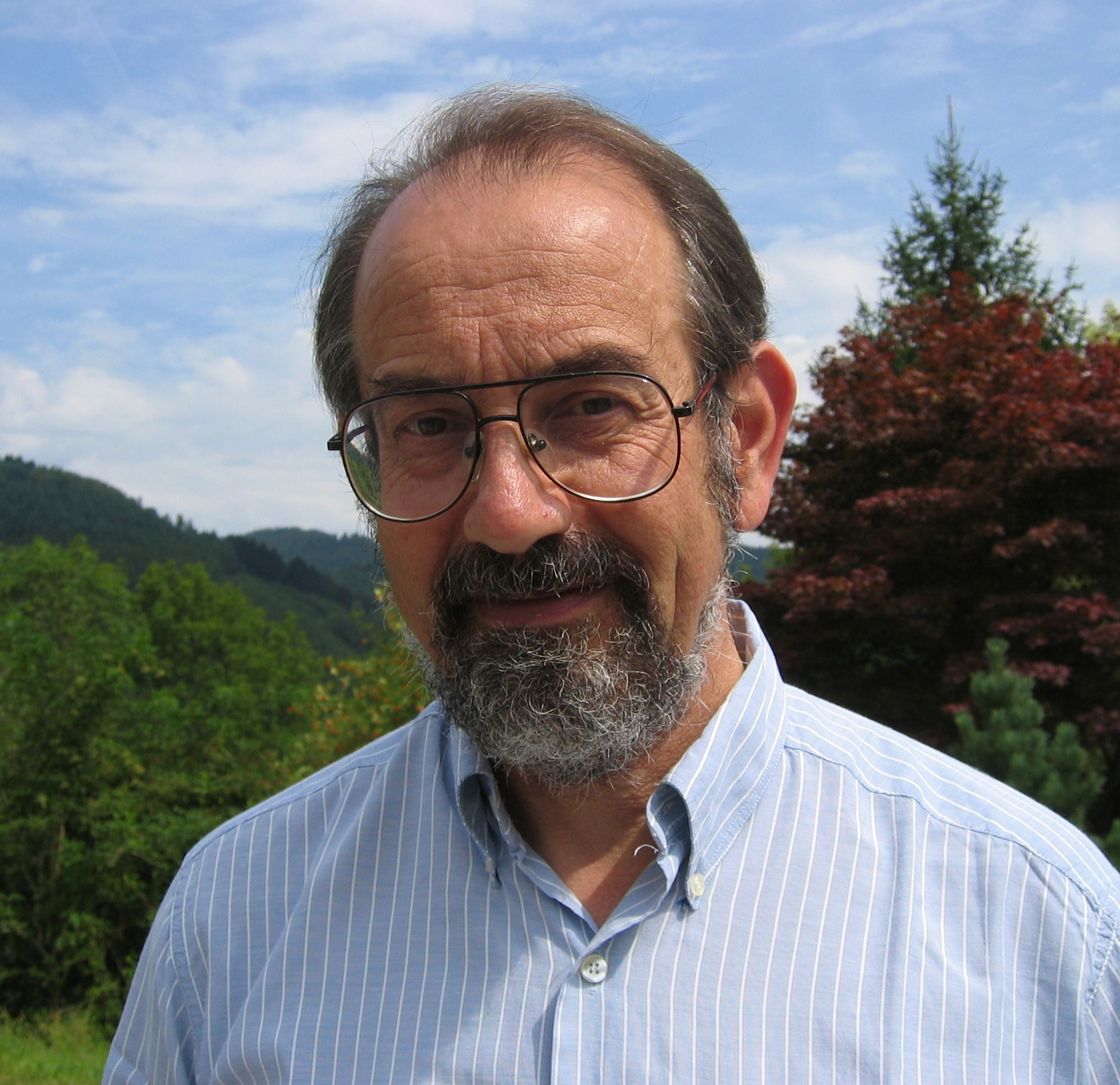
Nigel Hitchin

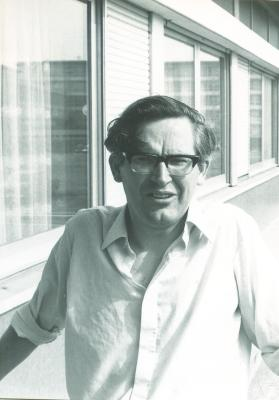
David Williams

Name	M	G	Degree	Notes	Ref
Jonathan Borwein	1971	1974	MSc (1972), DPhil Mathematics (1974)	Canadian Rhodes Scholar and mathematician; a professor at the University of Newcastle, Australia, since 2009; formerly a professor at Dalhousie University and Simon Fraser University, Canada	
S. Barry Cooper	1963	1966	BA	Professor of Mathematical Logic at the University of Leeds	
David E. Evans	—	1975	MSc (1973), DPhil Mathematics	Professor of Mathematics at the University of Cardiff; studied as an undergraduate at New College and moved to Jesus College in 1972	
John Griffiths (F)	1856	1862	BA Mathematics (1st, 1860), MA (1862)	Fellow and Tutor in Mathematics, with a particular interest in analytical geometry	
Nigel Hitchin (HF)	1965	1968	BA Mathematics	Mathematician working in the field of differential geometry and algebraic geometry; Savilian Professor of Geometry at Oxford (1997–2016)	
Hugh Jones	1708	1716	BA 1712; MA 1716	Professor of Mathematics at The College of William and Mary, Virginia (1717–1721); "Lord Baltimore's Mathematician"	
Jim Mauldon	1938	1947	BA Mathematics (1st)	Studies interrupted by military service during the Second World War, during which he won the Military Cross; a Fellow of Corpus Christi College, Oxford before becoming a professor at Amherst College in the United States	
H. W. Lloyd Tanner	1868	1873	BA Mathematics (1st, 1872), BA Natural Science (1st, 1873)	Professor of Mathematics and Astronomy at the University College of South Wales and Monmouthshire (1883–1909)	
Gareth Roberts	?	1985	BA Mathematics	Professor of Statistics at the University of Warwick since 2007; has a particular research interest in Markov chains	
David Williams (HF)	1956	1962	BA Mathematics (1st), DPhil Mathematics	Fellow of the Royal Society and specialist in probability	
Sir Edward Wright (HF)	1926	1929	BA Mathematics (1st)	Professor of Mathematics at Aberdeen University, having earlier been the first Junior Research Fellow at Christ Church	

=== Physicians ===
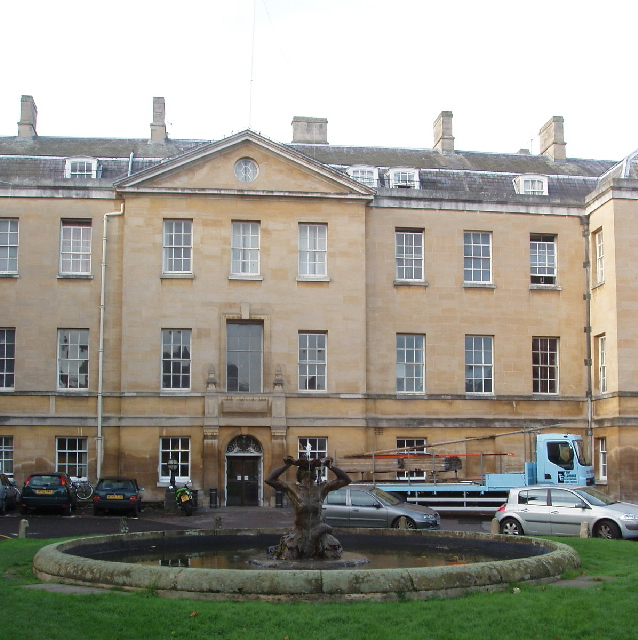
The Radcliffe Infirmary, Oxford, where Alexander Cooke was a consultant for over 30 years

Name	M	G	Degree	Notes	Ref
Nathan Alcock	1741	1749	MB (1744), MD (1749)	Physician and medical lecturer	
Alexander Cooke	1919	1923	BA Natural Science (1st)	May Reader in Medicine at Oxford (1933–1947), consultant physician at the Radcliffe Infirmary (1933–1966)	
John Jones (F)	1662	1666	BA (1666), MA (1670), BCL (1673), DCL (1677)	Chancellor of Llandaff Cathedral, physician and inventor	
Sir Seymour Sharkey (HF)	1866	1875	BA Natural Science (1st, 1870), MB (1875), MD (1888)	Consultant physician at St Thomas' Hospital	
Alban Thomas	?	?	?	Eighteenth-century Welsh physician; also worked with Moses Williams to collect and publish material contained in Welsh language manuscripts; he graduated from the University of Aberdeen and is not recorded in Foster's Alumni Oxonienses	
John Williams	1647	DNG	—	Welsh non-conformist minister, who also worked as a physician	
William Williams	1877	1881	BA Natural Science (1st)	Public health doctor with a particular interest in sanitation issues	

=== Biologists and other natural scientists ===
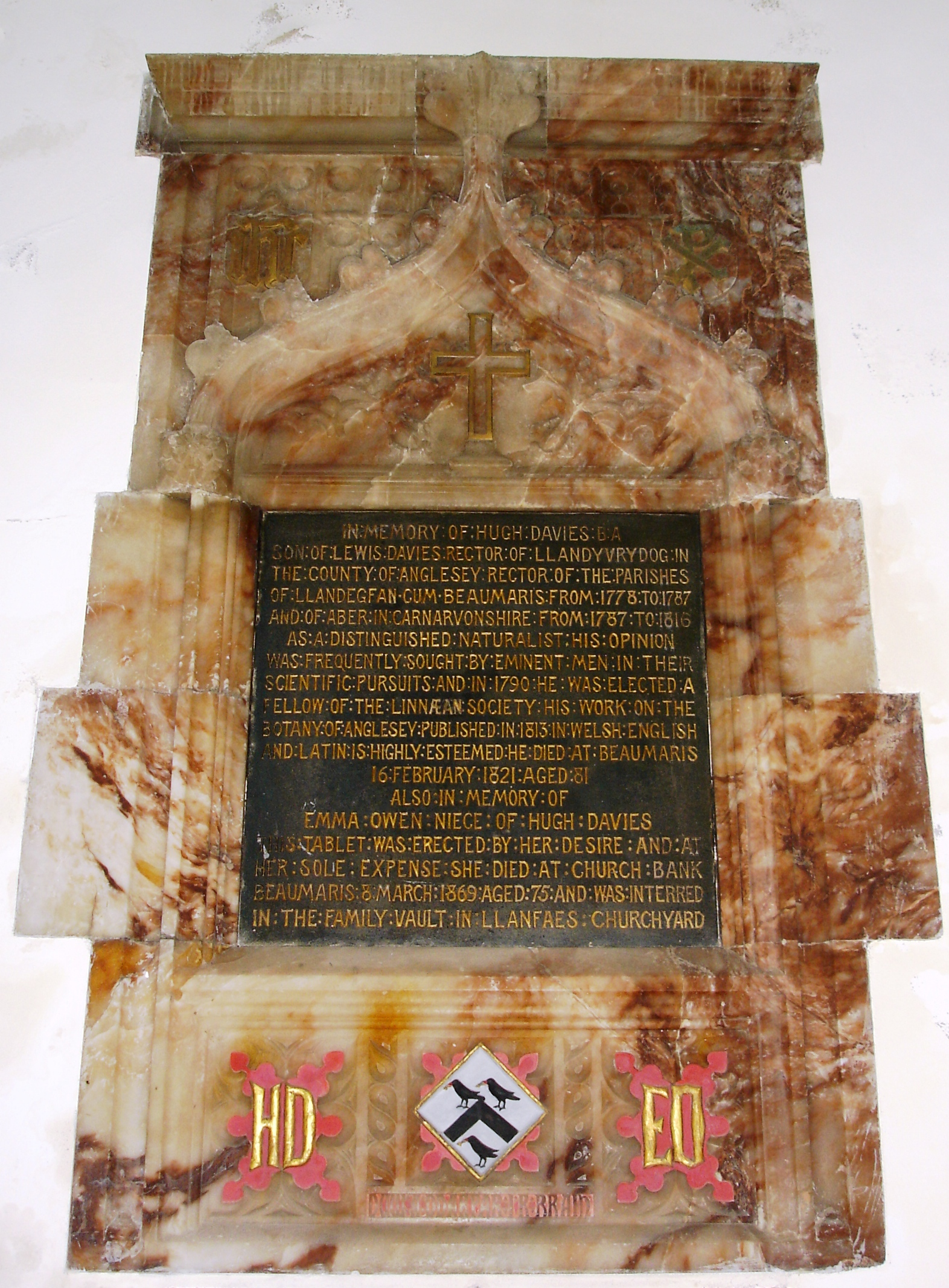
The memorial to Hugh Davies in St Mary's, Beaumaris

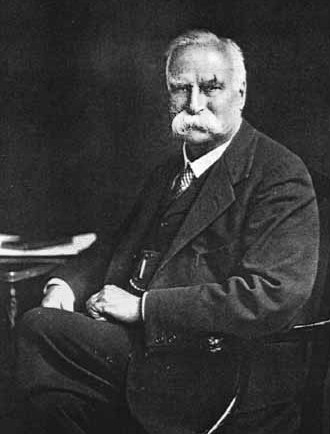
Edward Bagnall Poulton

Name	M	G	Degree	Notes	Ref
Arthur Church (F)	1891	1894	BA Natural Science (Botany) (1st)	University Reader in Botany (1910–1930), elected a Fellow of the Royal Society in 1921	
Francis Cole	1901	?	?	Professor of Zoology at Reading University (1906–1939), founder of the Cole Museum of Zoology	
Hugh Davies	1757	1762	BA	Welsh clergyman and botanist, whose main work, Welsh Botanology (1813), was the first to cross-reference the names of plants in Welsh with their scientific names	
William Weekes Fowler	—	1873	BA	Matriculated at New College before transferring to Jesus with a scholarship; a clergyman, headmaster and entomologist who was President of the Incorporated Association of Head Masters and President of the Entomological Society of London	
Walter Garstang	1884	1888	BA Natural Science (Animal Morphology) (2nd)	Invertebrate zoologist and marine biologist	
James Brontë Gatenby	1913	1920	BA Zoology (1st, 1916), DPhil (1920)	Professor of zoology and comparative anatomy at Trinity College, Dublin	
Edward Lhuyd	1682	DNG	—	Naturalist, botanist, linguist, geographer and antiquary	
Robert Cyril Layton Perkins	1885	1889	BA Natural Science (Animal Morphology) (4th)	Entomologist, noted for his work on the fauna of the islands of Hawaii	
Edward Bagnall Poulton (F)	1873	1876	BA Natural Science (1st)	Appointed Hope Professor of Zoology in 1893	
Ronald Winckworth	1906	1910	BA Mathematics	Natural historian, President of the Conchological Society of Great Britain and Ireland and vice-president of the Linnean Society	

=== Chemists ===
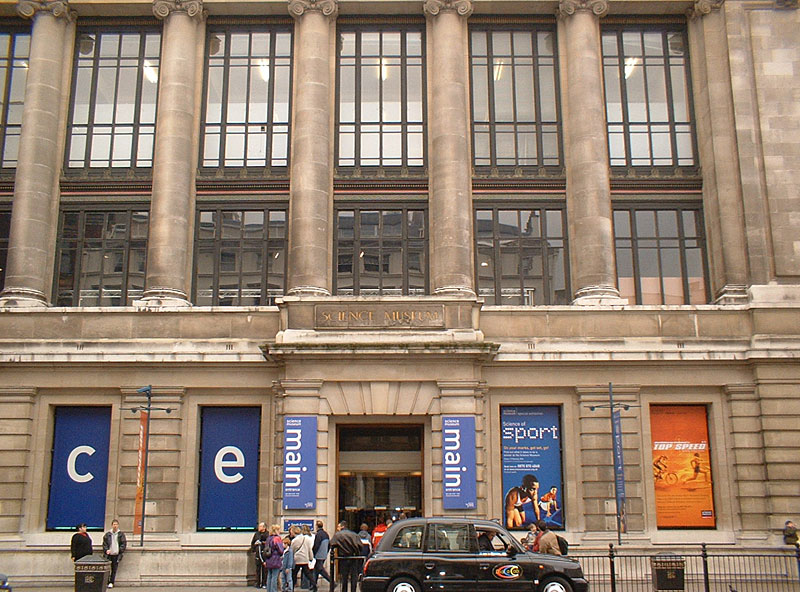
The Science Museum, where Frank Greenaway was Keeper of the Department of Chemistry for over 20 years

Name	M	G	Degree	Notes	Ref
Graham Dixon-Lewis	1940	1948	BA Chemistry (1944), DPhil (1948)	Combustion engineer and Fellow of the Royal Society	
Herbert George (F)	1911	1914	BA Natural Science (1st)	University lecturer in chemistry, college librarian and bursar	
Frank Greenaway	1936	1939	BA Chemistry	Keeper of the Department of Chemistry at the Science Museum (1967–1980); Reader in the History of Science at the Davy-Faraday Research Laboratory of the Royal Institution (1970–1985)	
William Lewis	1890	1894	BA Natural Science (Chemistry) (2nd)	Professor of Chemistry at University College, Exeter (1901–1935)	
Derek Long	1943	1949	BA Chemistry (1st, 1946), DPhil (1949)	Emeritus Professor of Structural Chemistry at the University of Bradford, working in the field of Raman spectroscopy	
John Rose	1929	1933	BA Chemistry (1932), BSc (1933)	Research chemist at Imperial Chemical Industries	
Walter H. Stockmayer (HF)	1935	1937	BSc (in gas kinetics)	American Rhodes Scholar, who was a chemist and pioneer of polymer science	
John Whiston	1911	1914	BA Chemistry (1st)	Associate Professor in chemistry at the Royal Military College of Science (1936–1956)	

=== Physicists ===
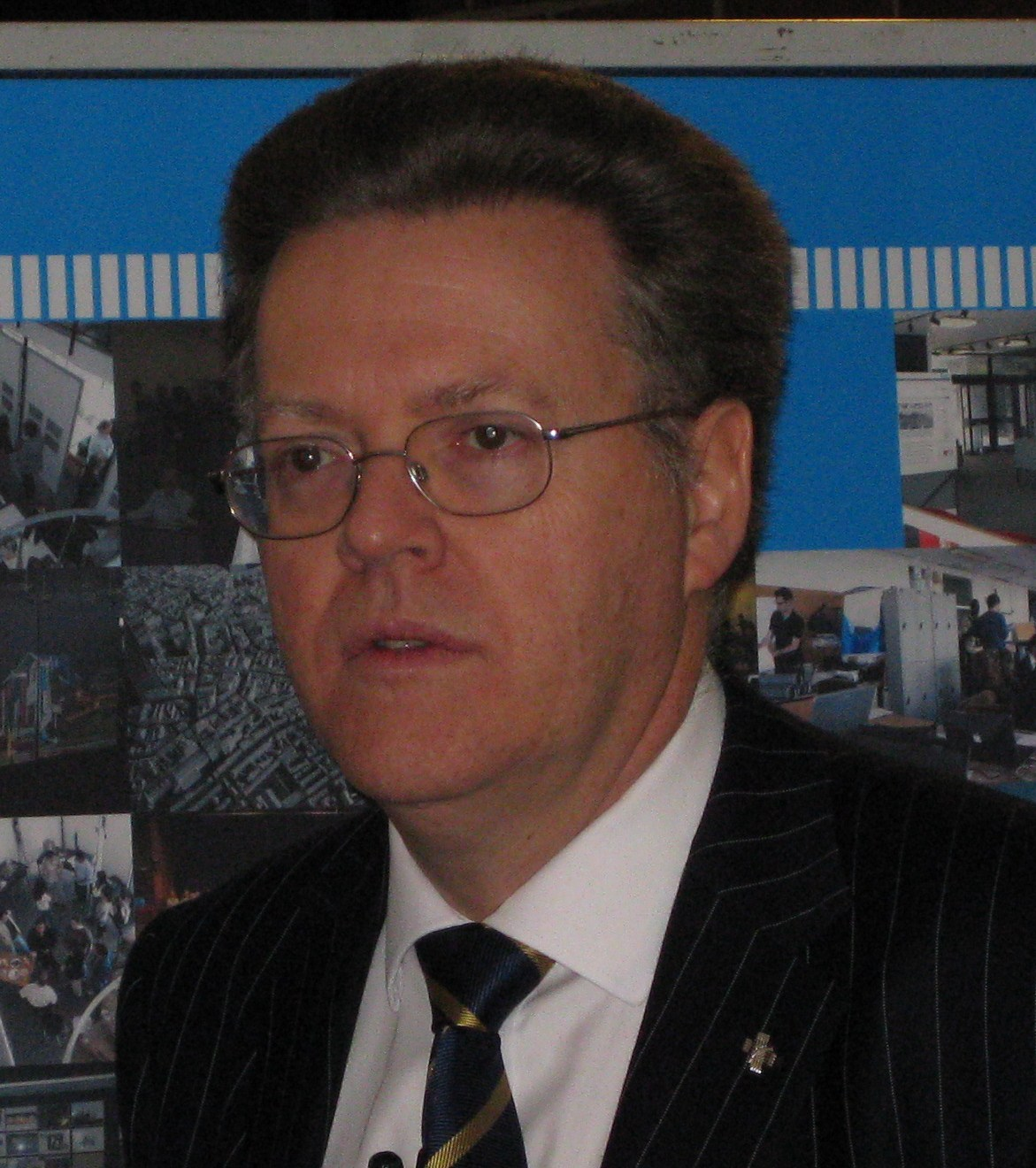
Keith Burnett

Name	M	G	Degree	Notes	Ref
Anatole Abragam (HF)	1948	1950	DPhil	A French physicist	
Keith Burnett (HF)	1972	1979	BA Physics (1975), DPhil Physics (1979)	Physicist and Vice-Chancellor of the University of Sheffield	
Edward Hinds	1968	1974	BA Physics (1971), DPhil (1974)	Physicist who won the Rumford Medal in 2008 for his work in ultra-cold matter	
Sir John Houghton (F/HF)	1948	1955	BA Physics (1st, 1951), DPhil Physics (1955)	Professor of Atmospheric Physics (1976–1983) and chair of the United Nations Intergovernmental Panel on Climate Change	
Gwyn Jones	1935	1938	BA Physics (1st)	Professor of Physics at the University of London, who became Director of the National Museum of Wales	
Chris Rapley	1966	1969	BA Physics	Director of the British Antarctic Survey (1998–2007); Director of the Science Museum (2007–2010)	
Stanley Whitehead	1920	1924	BA Physics (1st)	Director of the Electrical Research Association (1946–1956), specialising in dielectric research	
Michael Woolfson (HF)	1944	1947	BA Physics (2nd)	Professor of Theoretical Physics at the University of York (1965–1994)	

=== Other scientists ===
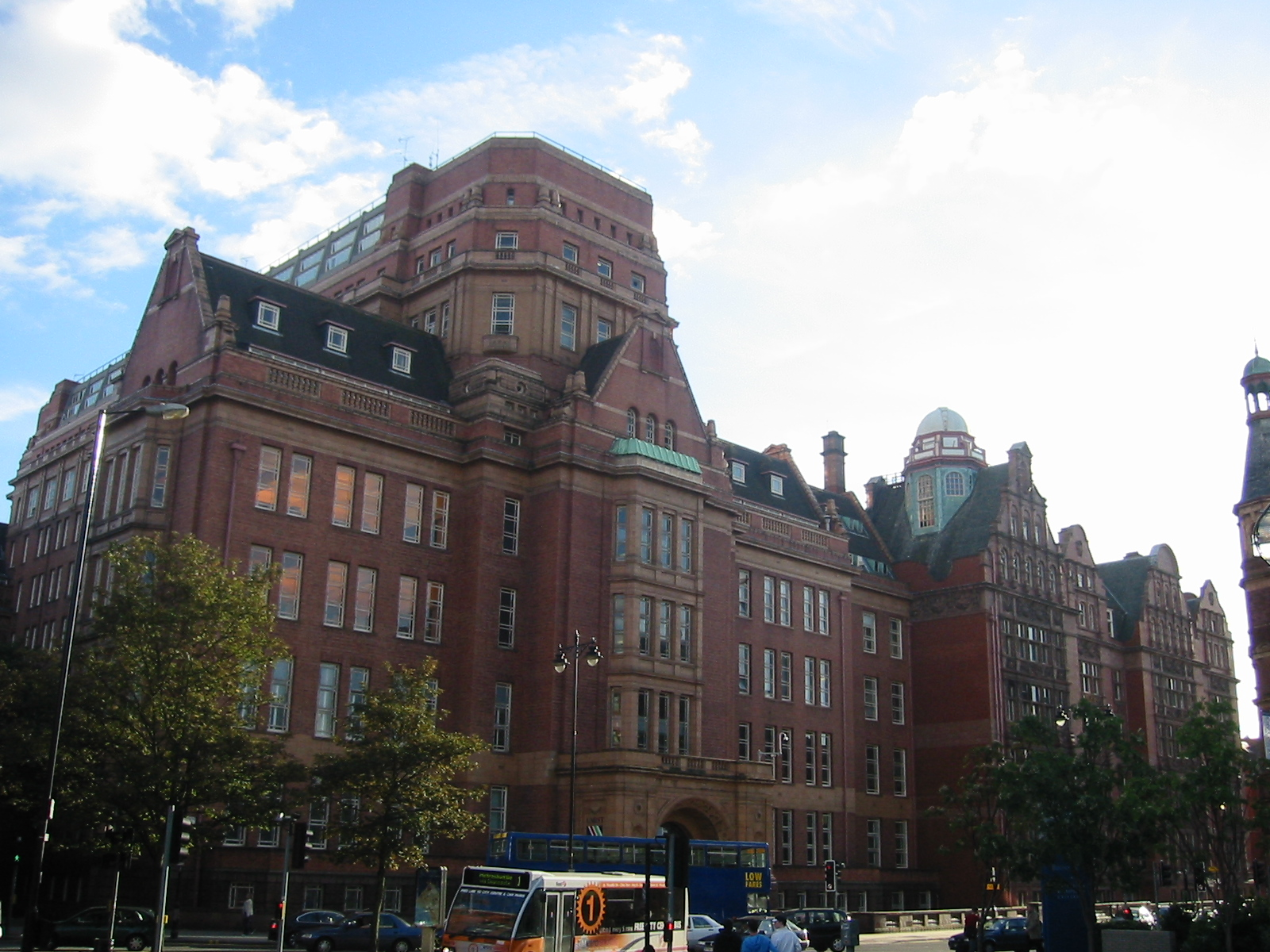
The main building of the University of Manchester Institute of Science and Technology, where Emlyn Rhoderick was a professor

Name	M	G	Degree	Notes	Ref
Roger Ainsworth (HF)	1970	1976	BA Engineering Science (1st), DPhil	Professor of sngineering science at Oxford (1998–2019) and Master of St Catherine's College, Oxford (2002–2019)	
Sir Cyril Burt (HF)	1902	1906	BA Literae Humaniores (2nd)	Educational psychologist	
Basset Jhones	1634	?	?	Welsh alchemist, doctor and grammarian	
William Lewis	1865	1869	BA Mathematics (1st, 1868), BA Natural Science (1st, 1869)	Professor of Mineralogy, Cambridge University (1881–1926)	
George Cadogan Morgan	1771	DNG	—	Dissenting minister and scientist, whose Lectures in Electricity were published in 1794	
Emlyn Rhoderick	1938	1941	BA Natural Science (1st)	Professor of solid-state electronics at the Manchester College of Science and Technology (later UMIST), and leading researcher in the field of semiconductors	
Gavin Schmidt	1985	?	BA Mathematics	Climatologist at the NASA Goddard Institute for Space Studies, New York	
Edwin Stevens (HF)	1927	1929	BA Natural Science (Physics, 2nd)	Inventor of the world's first wearable hearing aid and a major benefactor to the college, which named its flats in north Oxford "Stevens Close" in his honour	
Sir Graham Sutton (HF)	1923	1927	BSc Mathematics	Director-General of the Meteorological Office (1953–1965)	
