= Whitson (disambiguation) =

Whitson is a village in Wales.

Whitson may also refer to:

- Whitson (surname)
- 15057 Whitson, main-belt asteroid
- Cape Whitson, South Orkneys, Antarctica

== See also ==
- Whiston
- Wiston
- Wistow
