= Whiston =

Whiston may refer to:

== Places in England ==
- Whiston, Merseyside
- Whiston, Northamptonshire
- Whiston, South Staffordshire
- Whiston, Staffordshire Moorlands
- Whiston, South Yorkshire

== People with the surname ==
- Daniel Whiston (born 1978), English ice skater
- Donald Whiston (1927–2020), American former ice hockey player
- John Whiston (1893–1956), Associate Professor of Applied Chemistry at the Royal Military College of Science
- Peter Whiston (born 1968), English retired football defender
- William Whiston (1667–1752), English theologian, historian, and mathematician

== See also ==
- Whitson (disambiguation)
- Wiston (disambiguation)
- Wistow (disambiguation)
