= Leopard's bane =

Leopard's bane or leopard's-bane may refer to:

- Aconitum, also known as aconite, monkshood, wolf's bane, women's bane, Devil's helmet or blue rocket, a genus of flowering plants belonging to the buttercup family
- Arnica montana, also known as wolf's bane, mountain tobacco and mountain arnica, a European flowering plant with large yellow capitula
- Arnica cordifolia, more frequently known as heartleaf arnica, a North American plant
- Species of plants in the genus Doronicum (family Asteraceae), including
  - Doronicum orientale
  - Doronicum pardalianches
- Paris quadrifolia, also known as Herb Paris, True lover's Knot, a species in the family Melanthiaceae
