= Bane (plant) =

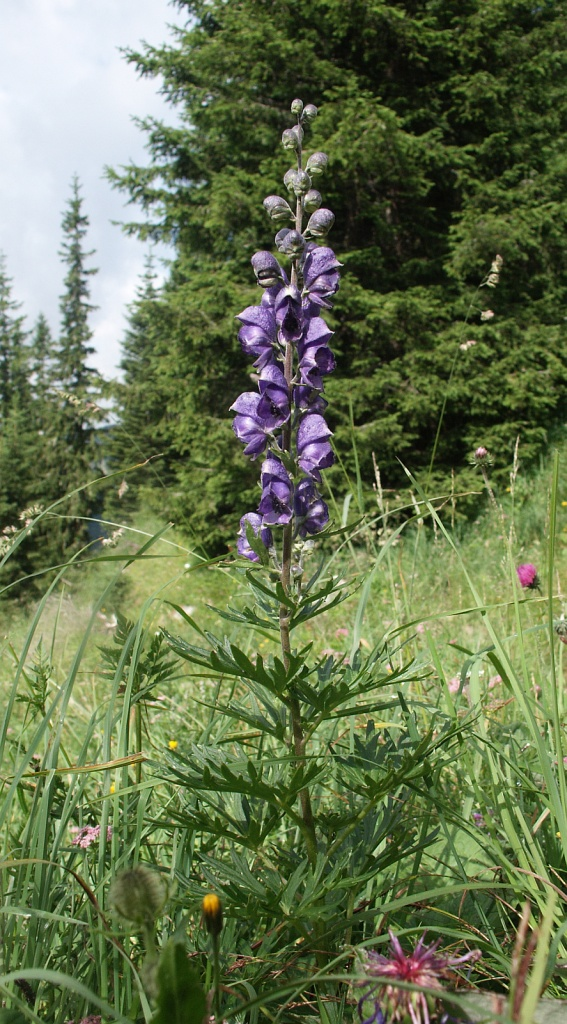
Aconitum napellus, a member of the flowering genus Aconitum, sometimes called wolfsbane

The term bane (from Old English: bana, meaning "thing causing death, poison"), in botany, is an archaic element in the common names of plants known to be toxic or poisonous.

In the Middle Ages, several poisonous plants were thought to have prophylactic qualities, repelling and protecting against that to which they were banes (e.g. henbane, wolfsbane).

== Variants ==
There is no single species, genus, or family of poisonous plant exclusively referred to as banes. Several unrelated plants bear the name.

Austrian leopard's bane
Doronicum austriacum, it grows between approximately 60 and 90 centimetres high with a spacing of 45 to 60 cm. It prefers full sun exposure to partial shade, requires little water, blooms in late spring to early summer, and has a bloom colour of bright yellow. The propagation for this plant would be division of rhizomes, tubers, corns, or the bulbs including the off position of the seeds.

Common dogbane
Apocynum androsaemifolium, a perennial herbaceous small shrub, growing up to one metre high, of the family Apocynaceae.

Dog bane
Plectranthus ornatus a perennial in the family Lamiaceae, said to repel dogs from gardens. Grows to a height of about 24-36 in. The plant prefers full sun exposure and not to be over watered. P. ornatus has a bloom time of late summer, early fall to mid-fall and a bloom color of light blue, violet, or lavender.

Henbane
Hyoscyamus niger, common name henbane is a poisonous plant in the family Solanaceae.

Leopard's bane
Doronicum orientale, also known as little leo. It grows between 40 and 46 cm high with a spacing of about 23 to 30 cm. All parts of the plant are poisonous if ingested. This plant is sensitive to the sun and over watering.

Wolfsbane
Aconitum napellus, common name wolfsbane, is a tall herb with purple flowers. The leaves are poisonous by ingestion or handling without gloves due to the presence of the highly toxic alkaloid aconitine. Used for assassination and in warfare since ancient times, and was believed to prevent werewolves from undergoing their dire transformations.

Fleabane
Erigeron, common name fleabane, is a large genus of plants in the family Asteraceae. It is closely related to the genus Aster and the true daisy Bellis.
