= Doronicum scorpioides =

Doronicum scorpioides is a botanical synonym of two species of plant:

- Doronicum pardalianches, synonym published in 1865 by Heinrich Moritz Willkomm & Johan Lange
- Doronicum grandiflorum, first synonym published in 1786 by Jean-Baptiste Lamarck and the second in 1803 by Carl Ludwig Willdenow
