= Agonopterix doronicella =

Scientific classification
- Kingdom: Animalia
- Phylum: Arthropoda
- Clade: Pancrustacea
- Class: Insecta
- Order: Lepidoptera
- Family: Depressariidae
- Genus: Agonopterix
- Species: A. doronicella

Binomial name
- Agonopterix doronicella (Wocke, 1849)

Synonyms
- Depressaria doronicella Wocke, 1849; Depressaria schmidtella Zeller, 1851; Depressaria laetella Herrich-Schäffer, 1853

Species of moth

Agonopterix doronicella is a moth of the family Depressariidae. It is found in France, Italy, Austria, the Czech Republic, Slovakia, Poland, Hungary, Romania, Bulgaria, North Macedonia, Albania, Bosnia and Herzegovina and Croatia.

The larvae feed on Doronicum austriacum.
