= Arthur Church =

Arthur Church may refer to:

- Arthur Herbert Church (1834–1915), British chemist
- Arthur Harry Church (1865–1937), British botanist
