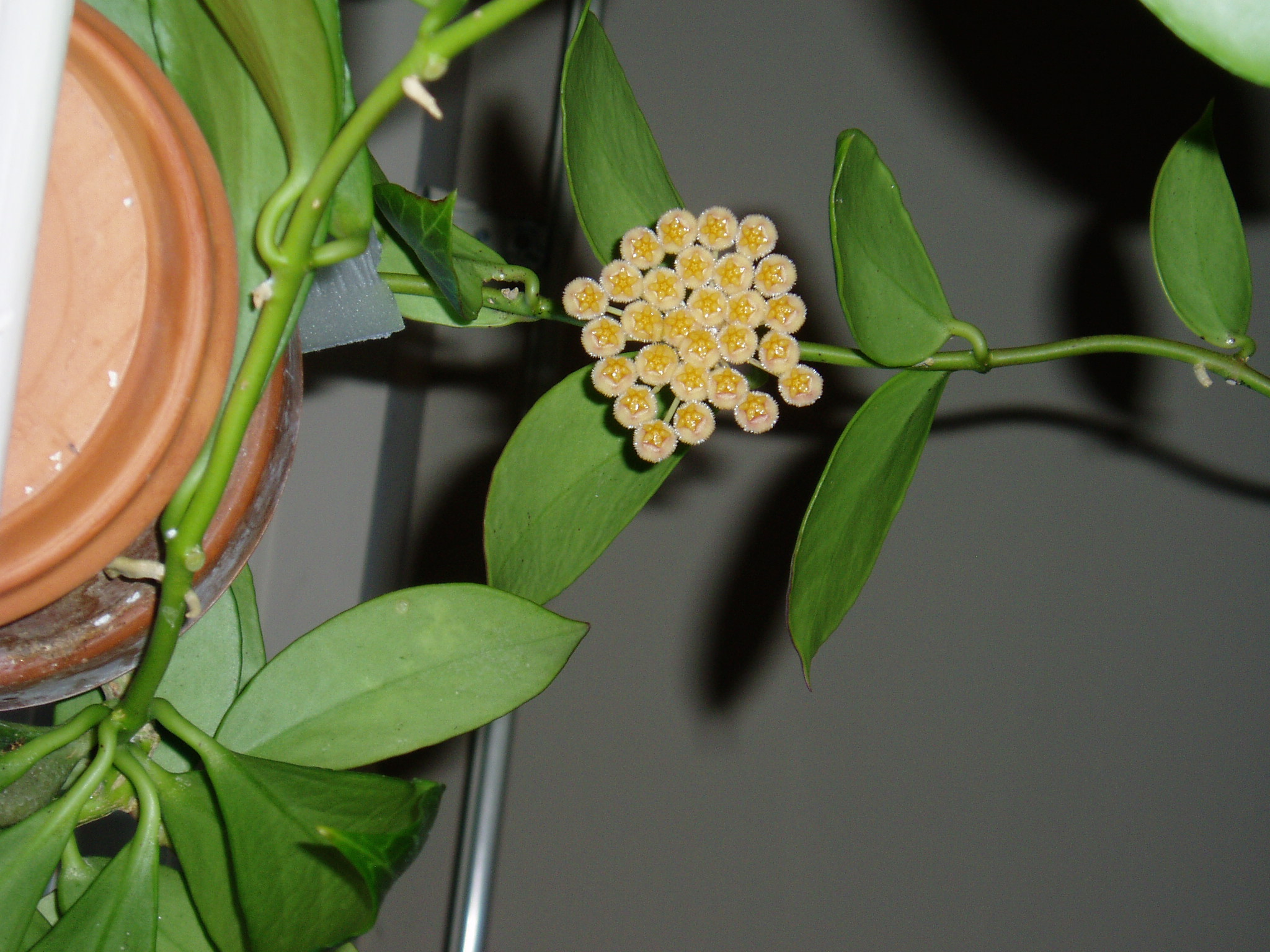

Scientific classification
- Kingdom: Plantae
- Clade: Tracheophytes
- Clade: Angiosperms
- Clade: Eudicots
- Clade: Asterids
- Order: Gentianales
- Family: Apocynaceae
- Genus: Hoya
- Species: H. obscura

Binomial name
- Hoya obscura Elmer ex C.M.Burton

= Hoya obscura =

Species of plant

Hoya obscura is a fast-growing, climbing species of Hoya in the dogbane (milkweed) family, Apocynaceae, found in the Philippines. The plant's many aerial roots (which the vine produces along its entire length) will gradually adhere to vertical surfaces nearby, such as buildings, trees or poles, acting as anchors and enabling the plant to receive better sun exposure away from the ground. Adequate light is imperative for photosynthesis and the production of inflorescences; a Hoya with insufficient sun or light exposure will often become visibly "droopy" and lacking in vigor. Likewise, excessive sunlight potentially causes dehydration and sunburn of the vine.

As a species, Hoya obscura is characterized by its diamond-shaped leaves which retain a verdant green hue when grown in shadier areas, but will visibly darken and "stress" to a rich, reddish-maroon color if given more bright, indirect light, or even brief periods of early morning or late afternoon sunlight. As previously stated, excess sunlight can cause burning or desiccation of the plant, especially in summertime or during the peak of the day (when most plants would prefer dappled or indirect light conditions).

Typically, Hoya obscura is very easy to grow, in appropriate conditions, and may thrive outdoors in Mediterranean, tropical or subtropical regions; it may be grown successfully indoors or in a protected area in temperate climates, especially if given a moss pole or trellis with which to support itself. Indoor-grown vines are generally more suited to mounting or trellising as they lack the direct sunlight exposure of outdoors. The blooms of Hoya obscura are reported to be highly aromatic, possibly amongst some of the most fragrant of any Hoya species.

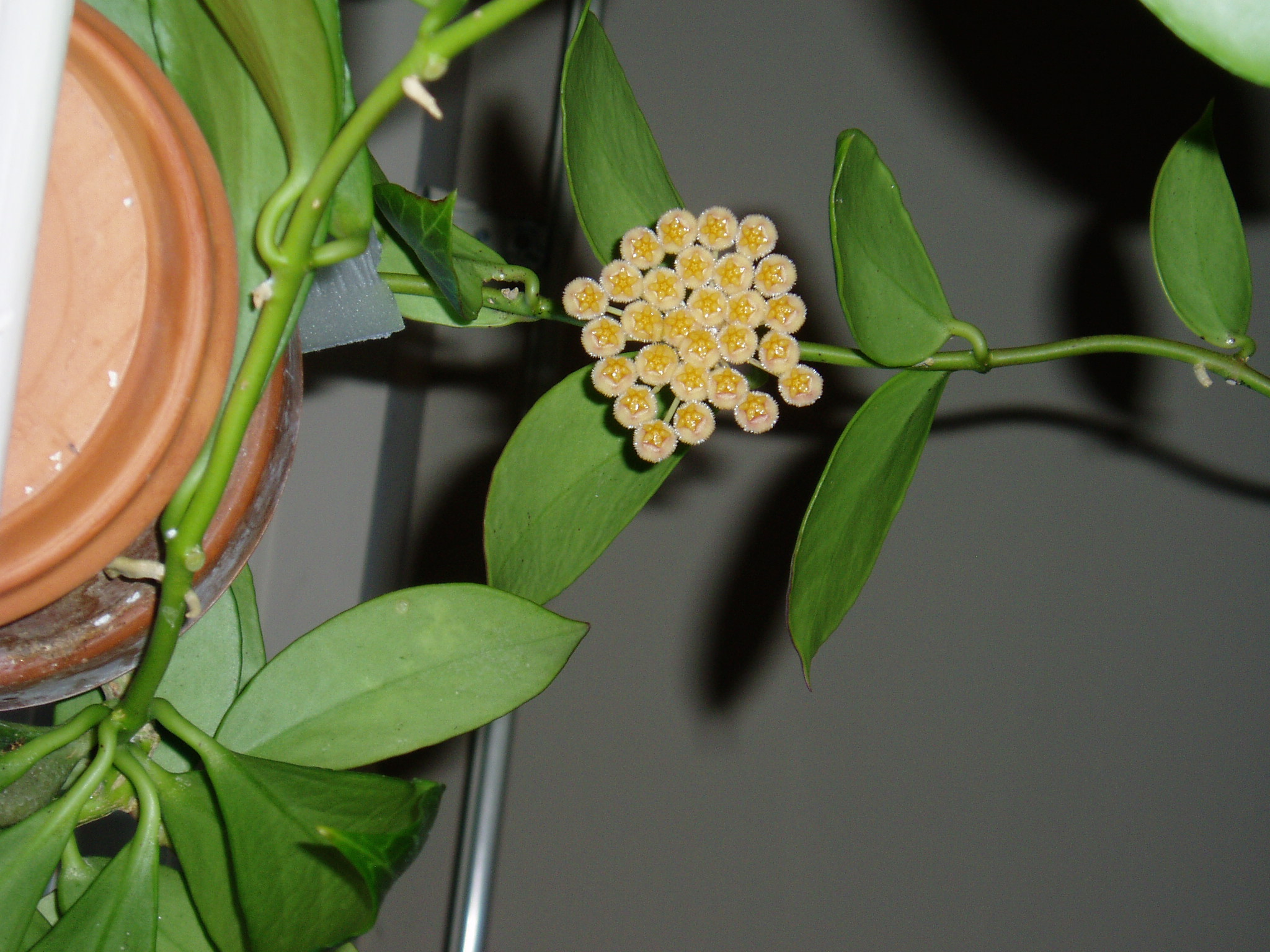
H. obscura
inflorescence, viewed from below.

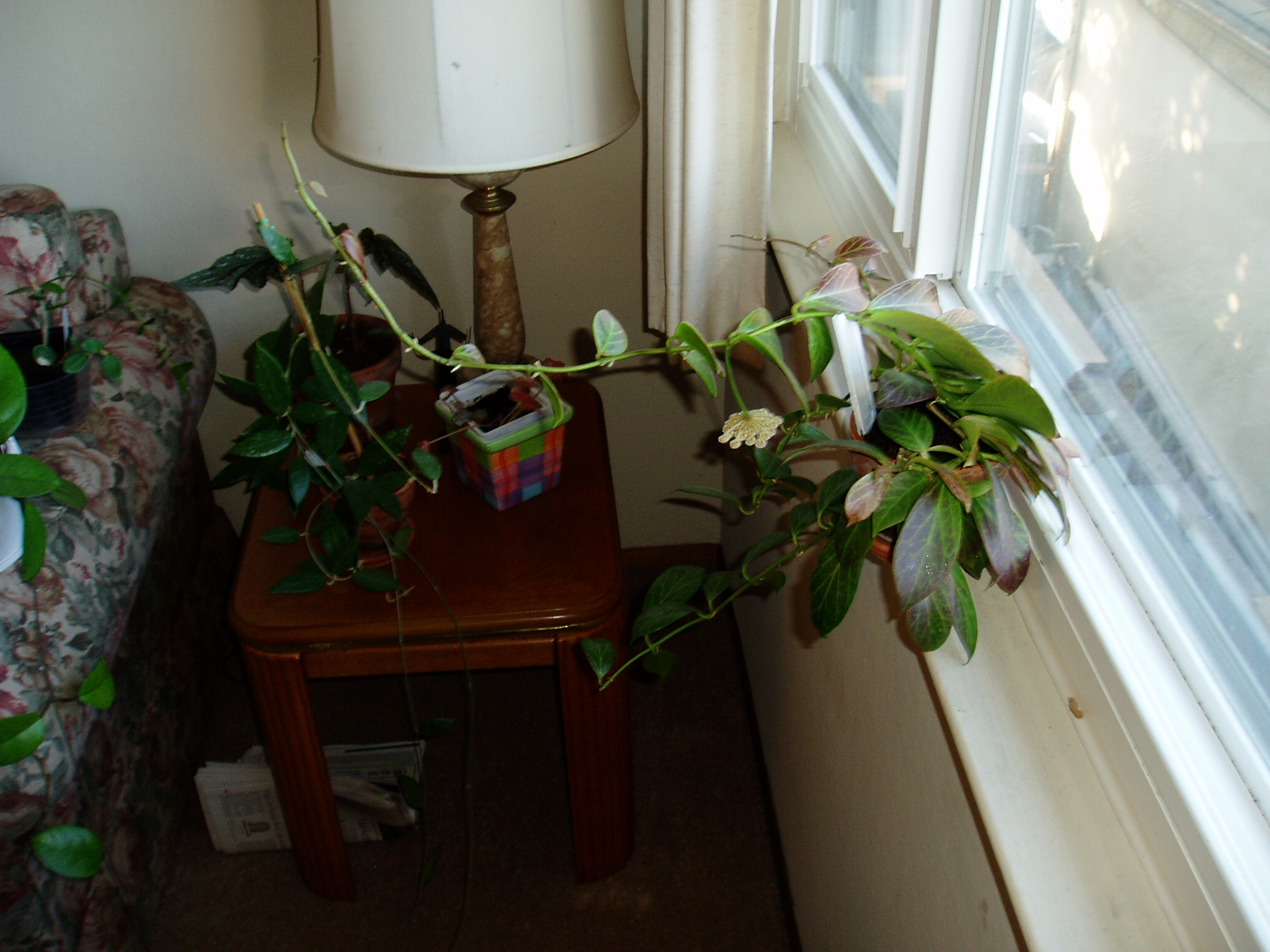
H. obscura
rooted cutting, 18 mos. old (in 4" clay pot).

H. obscura's
foliage "stresses" nicely when exposed to more light, either natural or artificial, with a maroon red venation.

== Description ==
- Growing habit: Viny and compact, leaves fairly close together along new shoots. Very fast grower in optimal conditions. Extremely floriferous.
- Sap color: milky.
- Leaf size: 2 cm to 10 cm.
- Epiphytic: Epiphytic to semi-epiphytic in the wild. Readily adapts to pot culture.
- Fragrance: Intense and pleasant, remarkably like a buttered cinnamon roll for the plant pictured. Wafts a considerable distance. Many people have likened the fragrance to Froot Loops cereal.
- Soil conditions: Must be moist but well-drained and airy. The specimen pictured is generally allowed to dry completely between waterings, and is rootbound in a 3-inch terra cotta pot.
- Outdoor zone: At least Zone 10, possibly cooler.
