= H. W. Lloyd Tanner =

English mathematician (1851–1915)

Henry William Lloyd Tanner (generally known as H. W. Lloyd Tanner) (17 January 1851 – 6 March 1915) was Professor of Mathematics at the University College of South Wales and Monmouthshire from 1883 to 1909.

== Life ==
Tanner was born on 17 January 1851 at Burham, Kent and was educated at Bristol Grammar School and Jesus College, Oxford, where he was taught by John Griffiths. He was appointed Professor of Mathematics and Astronomy at the University College of South Wales and Monmouthshire (now Cardiff University) in 1883, and held the post until 1909. He was a Fellow of the Royal Society and a Fellow of the Royal Astronomical Society. Tanner published various papers on differential equations and other subjects in mathematics.

The President of the Royal Society, Sir William Crookes, said in his anniversary address in November 1915 that Tanner's death meant that mathematical science had lost "one of its most distinguished exponents", one who published "many important investigations in mathematics" that were "distinguished by great ingenuity and originality". Crookes also said that the university was deeply indebted to Tanner's educational and administrative talents.
