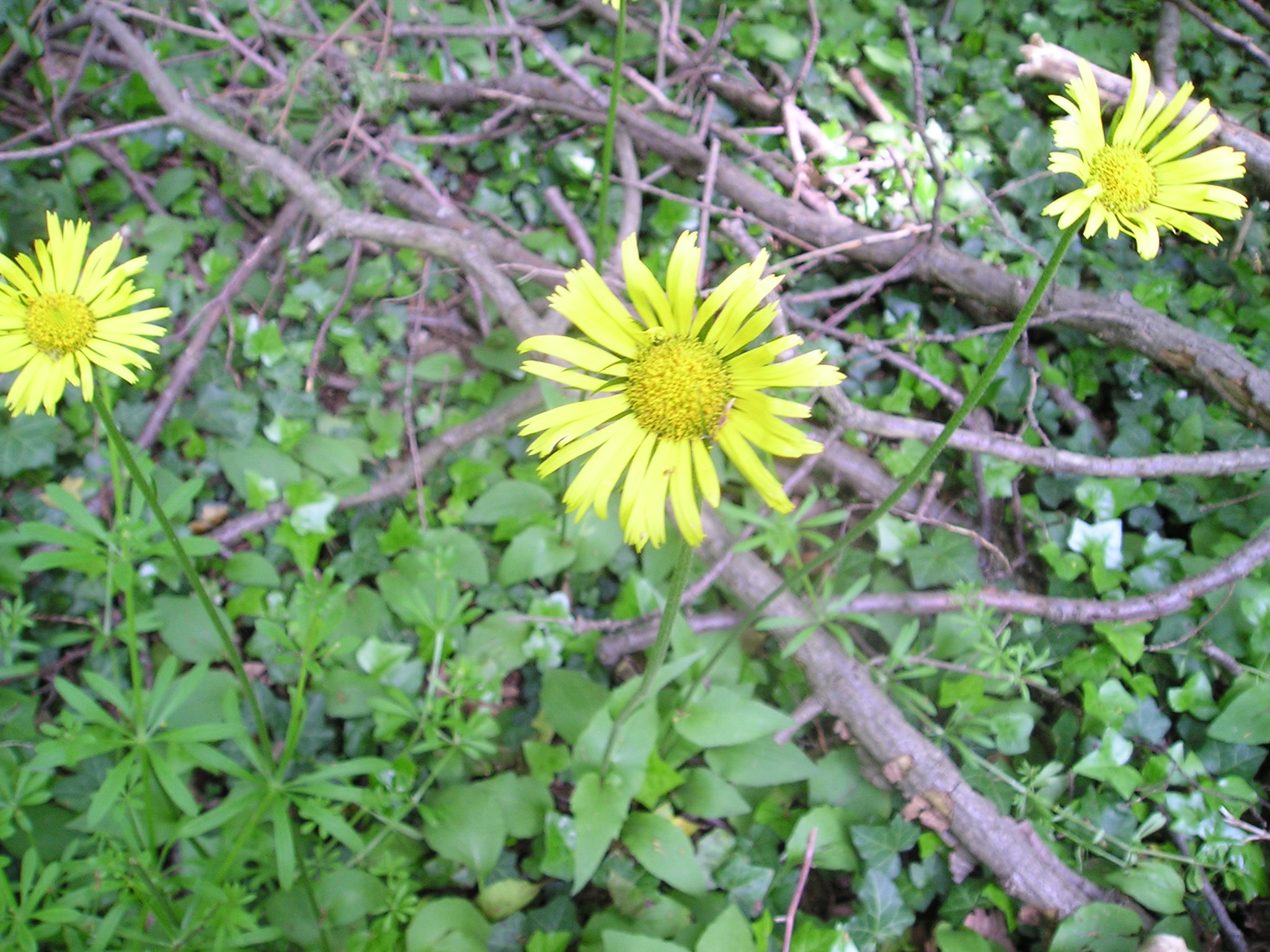

Scientific classification
- Kingdom: Plantae
- Clade: Tracheophytes
- Clade: Angiosperms
- Clade: Eudicots
- Clade: Asterids
- Order: Asterales
- Family: Asteraceae
- Genus: Doronicum
- Species: D. plantagineum

Binomial name
- Doronicum plantagineum L. 1753 not C.A.Mey. 1831 nor Roth 1788 Poir. 1817

Synonyms
- List: Aronicum atlanticum Chabert, syn of subsp. atlanticum; Doronicum atlanticum (Chabert) Rouy, syn of subsp. atlanticum; Doronicum emarginatum H.J.Coste, syn of subsp. emarginatum; Doronicum subcordatum H.J.Coste, syn of subsp. emarginatum; Doronicum willdenowii (Rouy) A.W.Hill, syn of subsp. emarginatum; Doronicum tournefortii Rouy, syn of subsp. tournefortii

= Doronicum plantagineum =

Species of flowering plant

Doronicum plantagineum, the plantain-leaved leopard's-bane or plantain false leopardbane, is a European plant species in the sunflower family. It is native to southeastern Europe from Greece and Italy to Ukraine and the Czech Republic. There are reports of the species being naturalized in the State of Oregon in the northwestern United States.

Doronicum plantagineum is a perennial herb up to 80 cm (2 feet) tall. Leaves are roundish, up to 11 cm (4.4 inches) long. The plant creates yellow flower heads one at a time, each up to 5 cm (2 inches) in diameter and containing both fay florets and disc florets.

Subspecies

- Doronicum plantagineum subsp. atlanticum (Rouy) Greuter
- Doronicum plantagineum subsp. emarginatum (H.J.Coste) P.Fourn.
- Doronicum plantagineum subsp. plantagineum
- Doronicum plantagineum subsp. tournefortii (Rouy) Cout.

The Latin specific epithet plantagineum refers to the leaves of the plant which are similar to those of a plantain.
