= Griffiths' theorem =

Griffiths' theorem: every red circle is a pedal circle of a blue point on the line through the circumcenter O, and G is the Griffiths point

Griffiths' theorem, named after John Griffiths (1837-1916), is a theorem in elementary geometry. It states that all the pedal circles for a points located on a line through the center of the triangle's circumcircle share a common (fixed) point. Such a point defined for a triangle and a line through its circumcenter is called a Griffiths point.

Griffiths published the theorem in the Educational Times in 1857. Its later rediscoveries include works by M. Weil in Nouvelles Annales de Mathématiques, 1880, and by W. S. McCay in Transactions of the Royal Irish Academy, 1889. Additionally, in 1906, Georges Fontené refound the theorem. So the theorem is also called the Fontené's (Second) theorem.

== See also ==
- Fontené theorems
