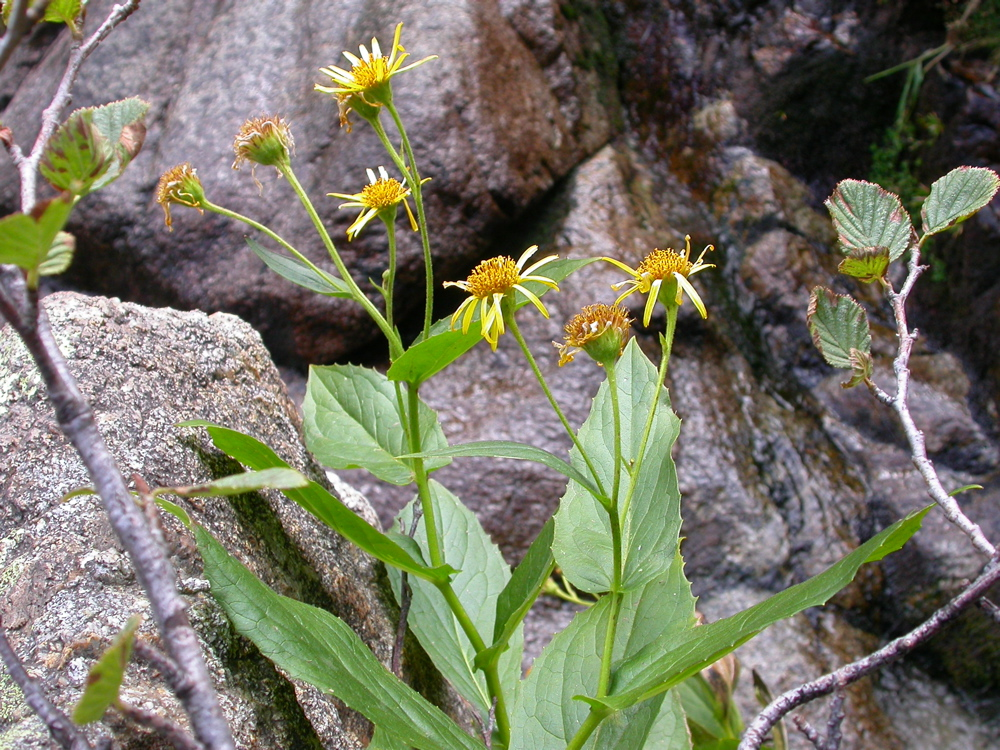
- Doronicum corsicum

Scientific classification
- Kingdom: Plantae
- Clade: Tracheophytes
- Clade: Angiosperms
- Clade: Eudicots
- Clade: Asterids
- Order: Asterales
- Family: Asteraceae
- Genus: Doronicum
- Species: D. corsicum

Binomial name
- Doronicum corsicum (Loisel.) Poir.

Synonyms
- Arnica corsica Loisel.; Aronicum corsicum (Loisel.) DC.

= Doronicum corsicum =

Species of flowering plant

Doronicum corsicum is a species of the genus Doronicum and the family Asteraceae. some authors have regarded the species as belonging to either Arnica or Aronicum. It is a rare plant that has been found only on the Island of Corsica in the Mediterranean (part of the French Republic).
