= Dogbane =

Name for certain plants that are reputed to kill or repel dogs

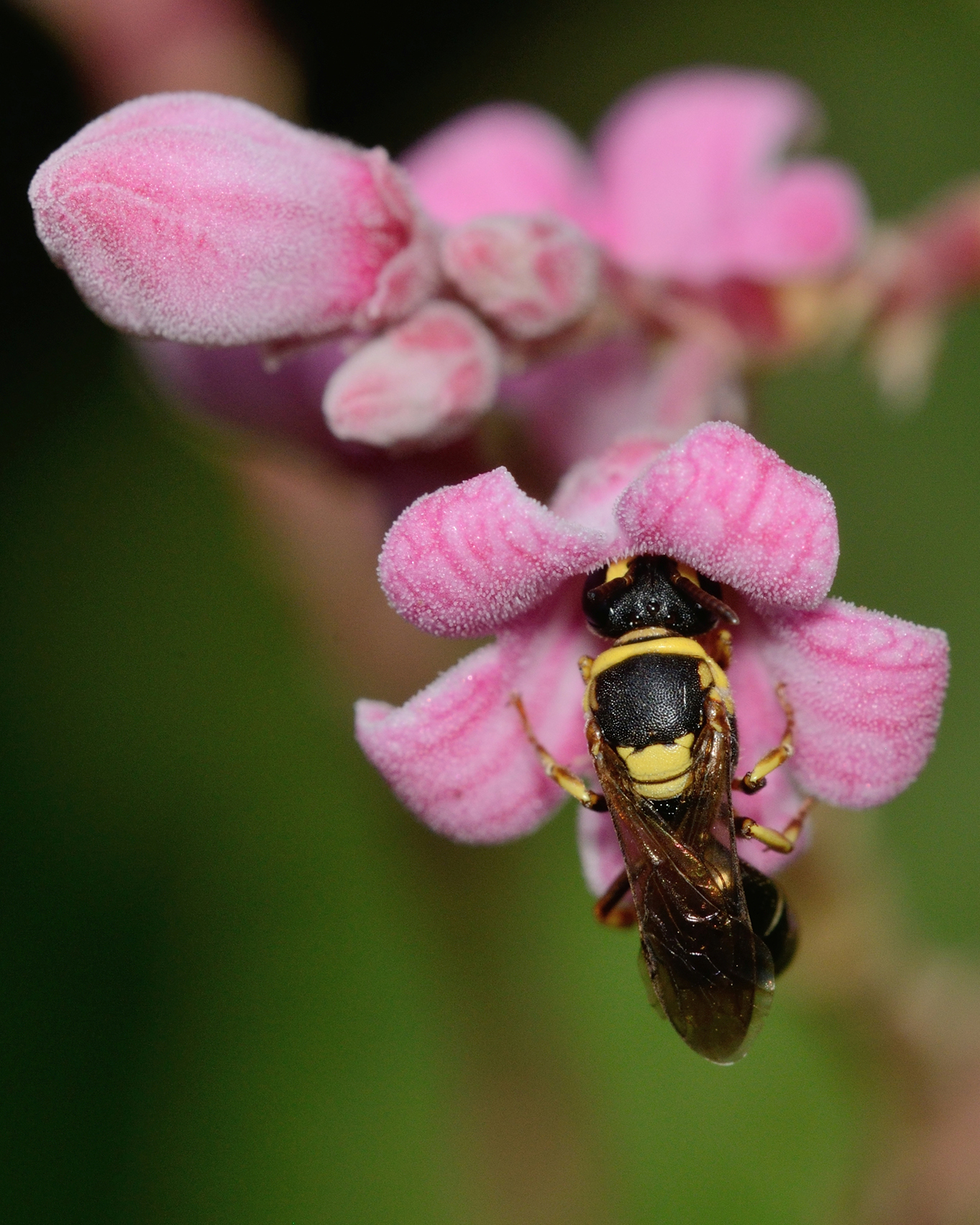
The solitary bee, Hylaeus pictus, foraging on Apocynum venetum; many dogbane species are valued as nectar plants

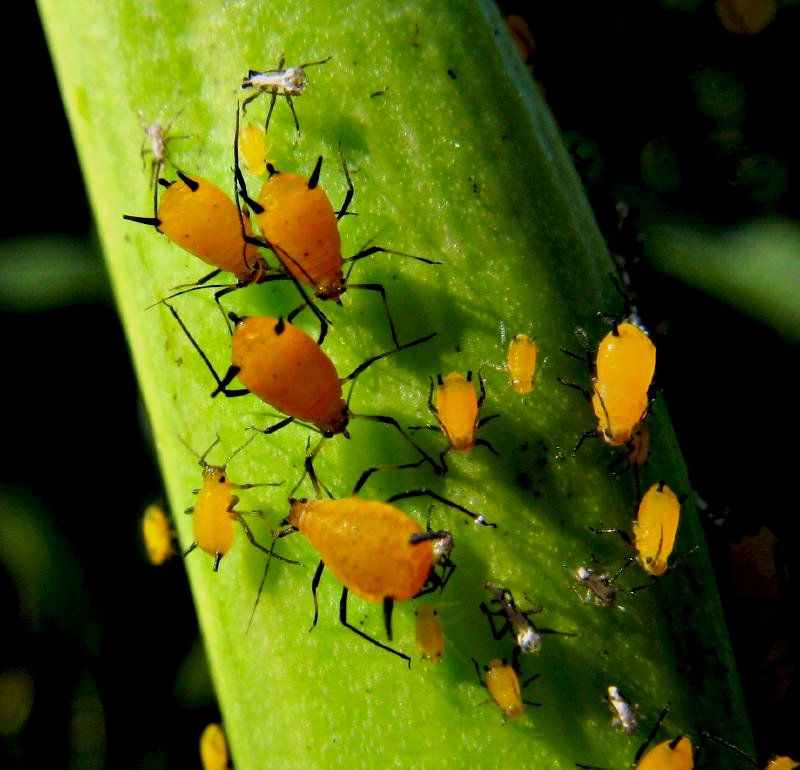
Milkweed, or oleander, aphid, Aphis nerii, feeds on members of the dogbane family. It accumulates the toxic compounds and, if disturbed, releases them in defence.

Dogbane, dog-bane, dog's bane, dogsbane, and other variations, some of them regional and some transient, are names for certain plants that are reputed to kill or repel dogs; "bane" originally meant "slayer", and was later applied to plants to indicate that they were poisonous to particular creatures.

== History of the term ==
The earliest reference to such names in common English usage was in the 16th century, in which they were applied to various plants in the Apocynaceae, in particular Apocynum. Some plants in the Asclepiadoideae, now a subfamily of the Apocynaceae, but until recently regarded as the separate family Asclepiadaceae, were also called dogbane even before the two families were united. It is not clear how much earlier the name had been in use in the English language, which originated about 1000 years earlier in mediaeval times. However, centuries before the appearance of the English language, Pedanius Dioscorides, in his De Materia Medica, had already described members of the Apocynaceae, such as Apocynum and Cynanchum by names equivalent to "dogbane"; Apocynum literally means "dog killer" or "dog remover", and "Cynanchum" means "dog strangler". In modern times some species of Nerium, Periploca and Trachelospermum, also in the Apocynaceae, are called dogbane or variants such as "climbing dogbane".

== Modern significance of the term "dogbane family" ==
Some modern sources note "dogbane" as strictly being the species also sometimes known as 'Indian hemp', Apocynum, though it is doubtful that such a narrow definition could be justified, even if it were enforceable. Still others consider Asclepias (milkweeds) to be the "true" dogbanes; however, when the majority of authors, horticulturists or gardeners refer to the "dogbanes", they are generally always referencing the entire Apocynaceae family, as a whole.

== "Dogbane" as a term outside the family Apocynaceae ==
Common names, either informal or vernacular, are seldom definitive, let alone stable. Some poisonous or offensive plants in practically unrelated families had similar common names in the vernacular and writings of various times; for example an edition De Materia Medica, apparently of the early sixteenth century, mentions that some species of Aconitum (wolf's-bane; family Ranunculaceae) were known as either "dog killer" (or murderer) or "wolf killer" ("...Sunt qui Cynoctonon: qui Lycoctonon... uocent"). Again, in modern times Isocoma menziesii in the family Asteraceae is known in some regions as dogbane.

== Recent aberrant application of the term ==
The term "dogbane" (as well as "cat-scat")—either out of genuine confusion or as a deliberate sales ploy for gardeners desiring a natural animal repellent—has been used without obvious justification to several other groups of plants, such as some species of Plectranthus (ironically, a genus in the catnip subfamily Nepetoideae of the mint family Lamiaceae). While none have been reported to be especially harmful, or even useful against nuisance animals, in the garden, many—such as Plectranthus (Coleus) caninus—have very fragrant, oily leaves which give an intensely pungent, skunk- or cannabis-like aroma when brushed, disturbed or touched. At times, simply the wind blowing can trigger the release of the essential oils into the surrounding area. The smell has been reported, by some sources, to keep nuisance animals at bay; however, if a plant is not poisonous or otherwise offensive to them, many animals quickly become accustomed to various botanical aromas and remain unbothered. Frequently, these plants are more effective at repelling humans from a given area, as the essential oils are strong, sticky, and exude a distinct aroma of marijuana or skunk-spray, which may linger for hours on the skin, gloves, clothing, or any other surface it contacts.
