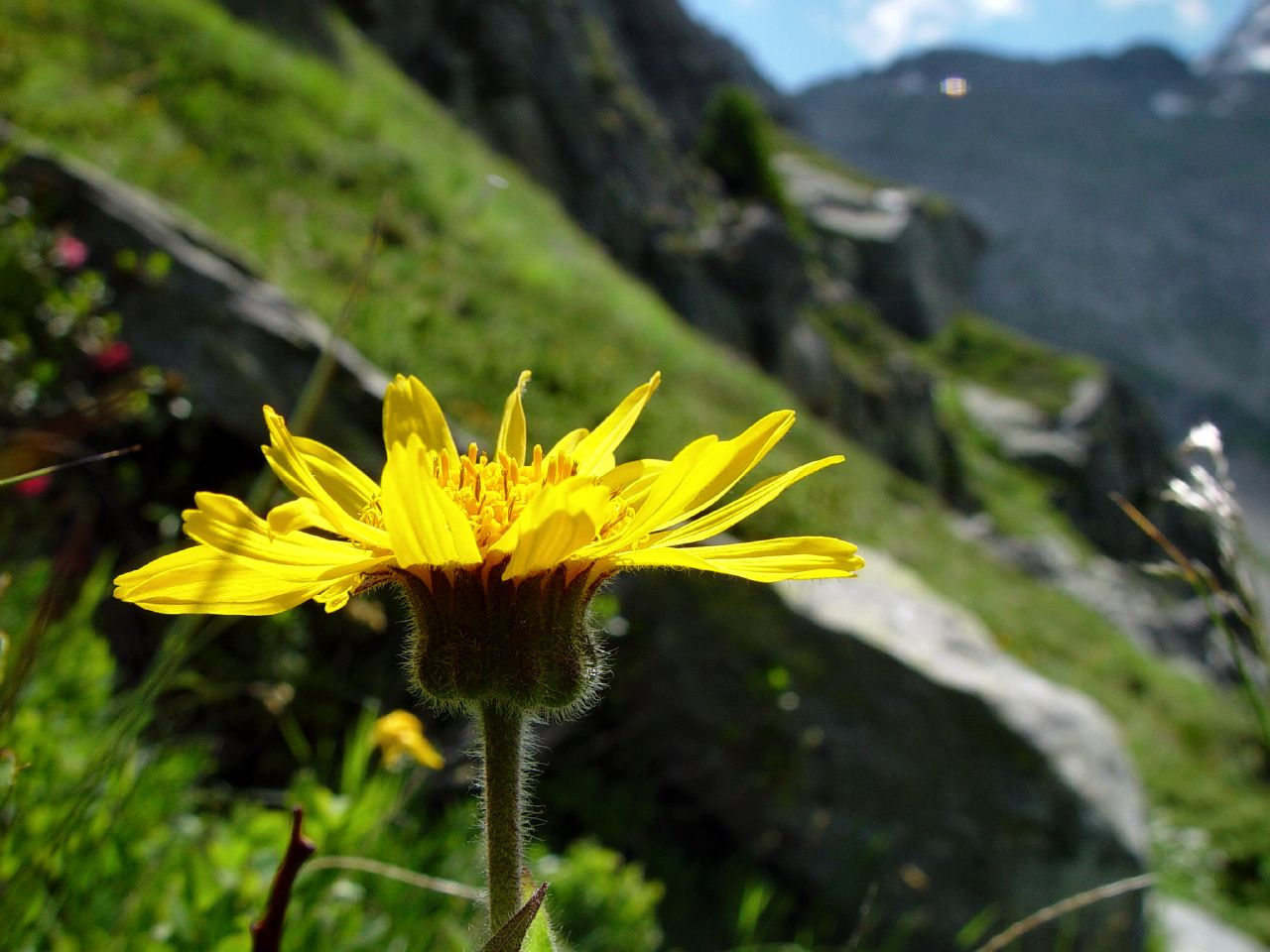

Scientific classification
- Kingdom: Plantae
- Clade: Tracheophytes
- Clade: Angiosperms
- Clade: Eudicots
- Clade: Asterids
- Order: Asterales
- Family: Asteraceae
- Genus: Doronicum
- Species: D. clusii

Binomial name
- Doronicum clusii (All.) Tausch

= Doronicum clusii =

Species of flowering plant

Doronicum clusii is a species of flowering plant native to Europe.
