= Arthur Harry Church =

British botanist and botanical illustrator (1865–1937)

Arthur Harry Church FRS (28 March 1865 – 24 April 1937) was a British botanist and botanical illustrator. He was also a pioneer amateur photographer. From 1908 to his retirement in 1930 he was a lecturer in botany at Oxford University and was best known for his inspiring lectures.

== Biography ==
Church was born in Plymouth, England, the son of a saddler, and went to school locally. He taught briefly at Ashburton Grammar School. In 1887 his mother died and, with his inheritance of £100, he went to University College of Wales, Aberystwyth. With a first (London external) degree in Botany he won in 1891 a scholarship to Jesus College, Oxford, obtaining a first-class Oxford degree in botany in 1894.

He was a research fellow of Jesus College from 1908 to 1912 and University Reader in Botany from 1910 to 1930. He was elected as a Fellow of the Royal Society in 1921. His particular fields of interest were phyllotaxy, the development and arrangement of parts of the flower and one-celled sea plants. Church was chiefly interested in morphology and did not take much interest in evolutionary trees although he wrote on the adaptations involved in evolution of land plants in his work on the Thalassiophyta (1919). He was a fine illustrator and photographer, sometimes illustrating his own publications. He was also known for his abilities in preparing microscopic specimens, illustration, and above all inspiring lectures. His publishing was quite limited.

He married Emma Palmer Pratt of Aberystwyth. They had three daughters. Each daughter was given as her middle name the name of a plant in flower at the time of her birth: Audrey Althea (hollyhock), Rosemary Doronica (Doronicum orientale) and Grace Coryla (hazel).

== Publications ==
- Church, Arthur Harry (1908). Types of floral mechanism; a selection of diagrams and descriptions of common flowers arranged as an introduction to the systematic study of angiosperms. Oxford University Press. ISBN 9781313223874.
- Church, Arthur Harry (1919). Thalassiophyta and the subaerial transmigration. Oxford University Press.
