= John Griffiths (mathematician) =

Welsh mathematician (1837–1916)

John Griffiths (1837 – May 1916) was a Welsh mathematician and academic associated with Jesus College, Oxford, for nearly 60 years.

== Biography ==
Griffiths was born in Llangyndeyrn near Kidwelly in Carmarthenshire, Wales, and educated at Cowbridge Grammar School. He matriculated at Jesus College in 1857 with a scholarship, and obtained a first-class degree in mathematics, winning the Junior and Senior Mathematical Scholarships. In 1863, he was elected as Fellow and Tutor in Mathematics at Jesus College. Griffiths held his fellowship until his death in May 1916, by which time he had become the longest-serving fellow. He also served as the college's bursar for a time.

Griffiths was particularly interested in analytical geometry, publishing numerous papers in mathematical journals and two tracts on theorems connected with the geometry of the triangle. He was described in his obituary in The Times as "a man of a very sociable and affectionate nature [but] excessively shy". He died in May 1916 in his native village in Carmarthenshire.

Griffiths' theorem describing a property of pedal circles in a triangle is named after him.
