= Frank Greenaway =

Frank Greenaway (9 July 1917 – 16 June 2013) was Keeper of Chemistry at the Science Museum in London, England. He authored a number of books and papers on the history of chemistry.

Frank Greenaway studied chemistry at Jesus College, Oxford. He was invalided out of the War and subsequently taught in Bournemouth, where he met his wife, Miranda (1916–2008). They had four children.

Greenaway lived in Surrey for most of his career as a curator at the Science Museum in London and a leading historian of science, specializing in chemistry. He retired to Reading, Berkshire.

== Selected work ==
=== Books ===
- John Dalton and the Atom, Cornell University Press, 1966. ISBN 978-0-8014-0160-2.
- Chemical Laboratories and Apparatus to 1850, HMSO, 1966. Part 1 of a 4-part series.
- Chemistry, Science Museum, HMSO, 1968.

=== Papers ===
- History of Chemistry, Nature, 219(5152), pp. 415–416, 1968. doi:10.1038/219415c0
- Platinum Metals in the Development of Analytical Chemistry, Platinum Metals Review, 18(3), pp. 104–108, July 1974.
- Analytical chemistry in modern society: 200 years of development, Analytical Chemistry, 48(2), pp. 148a–154a., 1976. doi:10.1021/ac60366a041.
- A personal encounter with French chemistry: the 1950 French Scientific Instrument Exhibition at the Science Museum, 2001.
- "From classical to modern chemistry: the instrumental revolution". Chemistry & Industry. 6 January 2003.
