= David E. Evans =

British mathematician and academic

David E. Evans FLSW was born in 1950 at Glanamman, Dyfed, Wales. He is a professor of mathematics at Cardiff University, specialising in knot theory. He has published a number of books, many in collaboration with Yasuyuki Kawahigashi.

He studied at New College, Oxford, and Jesus College, Oxford.

From 1975 to 1976 Evans worked as a scholar and research assistant in the department of theoretical physics at the Dublin Institute for Advanced Studies. Over the next few years he travelled around the world working as a research fellow at UCLA (1977); Australian National University, Canberra (1982, 1989); Kyoto University (1982–83, 1985); and the University of Ottawa (1983). Between 1987 and 1998 he worked as a professor at Swansea, Wales. Since 1998, he has worked as a professor at Cardiff University.

== Awards and honours ==
- Junior Mathematical Prize, 1972
- Senior Mathematical Prize, 1975
- Johnson Prizes, 1975
- Whitehead Prize – London Mathematical Society, 1989.
- Elected a Fellow of the Learned Society of Wales, 2011.

== Notable published works ==
- Quantum Symmetries on Operator Algebras (David E. Evans and Yasuyuki Kawahigashi, published 21 May 1998) One of the first books to examine post-1981 combinatorial-algebraic developments with respect to operator algebras. Intended for an audience of graduate students and researchers of the field.
- Integrable lattice models for conjugate A^(1)_n (David E. Evans and R. E. Behrend, published 2004 in J. Phys. A) Evans's most recently published paper.
