= Emlyn Rhoderick =

Welsh physicist and academic

Emlyn Huw Rhoderick (29 September 1920 – 24 March 2007) was a Welsh physicist and academic, who spent 33 years as professor of solid-state electronics at the Manchester College of Science and Technology (later known as UMIST).

== Life ==
Rhoderick was born in Pontypridd, south Wales on 29 September 1920. He was educated at Cowbridge Grammar School and Jesus College, Oxford, obtaining first-class honours in natural science (physics), having studied mathematics in his first year at the university on the advice of his tutor. Before studying nuclear physics at Trinity College, Cambridge, he worked on coastal defence radar at the Royal Signals and Radar Establishment during the Second World War. He then taught at Glasgow University and, after winning a Fulbright Fellowship, at Columbia University. In 1954, he was appointed as principal scientific officer at the Services Electronic Research Laboratory at Baldock, Hertfordshire, working on semiconductors and superconductors. He was promoted to senior principal scientific officer.

Rhoderick's work attracted the attention of Lord Bowden, the principal of the Manchester College of Science and Technology, who asked Rhoderick to become the first-ever professor of solid-state electronics. He was appointed in 1962 and spent the following 33 years in Manchester, building an internationally recognised research group and conducting significant research himself; his published work on semiconductors became a standard reference on the topic. He took on organisational responsibilities at the university, acting as vice-principal to resolve a conflict between the principal and the chairman of council, and becoming temporary head of an arts department that was in severe difficulties.

Rhoderick died on 24 March 2007.
