= Alexander Macdougall Cooke =

Alexander Macdougall Cooke (17 October 1899 – 5 January 1999) was a British doctor and academic at the University of Oxford.

== Life ==
Cooke was born on 17 October 1899 and educated at Merchant Taylors' School before serving in the Royal Fusiliers, Royal Flying Corps and the Royal Air Force between 1917 and 1918 during the First World War. He studied at Jesus College, Oxford (obtaining a first-class degree in Natural Science in 1920) and St Thomas's Hospital Medical School, London (obtaining his Bachelor of Medicine degree in 1923). After qualification, he worked in St Thomas' Hospital before returning to Oxford in 1932 as a consultant physician at the Radcliffe Infirmary; he was to remain there until his retirement in 1966, when he was made an honorary consultant. He was also May Reader of Medicine at the University of Oxford from 1933 to 1947, and Director of Clinical Studies at the university's medical school from 1939 to 1949. He was appointed a Fellow of Merton College, Oxford in 1942, becoming an emeritus fellow on retirement. He lectured to the Royal College of Physicians and held various positions within the college, as well as with other medical organisations. His publications included a History of the Royal College of Physicians of London Volume III (1972) and My Seventy Five Years of Medicine (1994), as well as papers on medical history and medicine. He died on 5 January 1999.
