= Pedal circle =

$\triangle ABC$ with sides $a, b , c$ and point $P$ feet of the perpendicular: $P_a, P_b, P_c$ center of the circumcircle: $O$ the green segments are used in the formula for radius

$\triangle ABC$ with isogonal conjugates $P$ and $Q$ 6 feet on the pedal circle: $P_a, P_b, P_c, Q_a, Q_b, Q_c$ center of the pedal circle and midpoint of $PQ$: $M$ angle bisectors: $w_a, w_b, w_c$

4 points $A,B,C,D$ and 4 pedal circles intersecting in $S$

The pedal circle of the a triangle $ABC$ and a point $P$ in the plane is a special circle determined by those two entities. More specifically for the three perpendiculars through the point $P$ onto the three (extended) triangle sides $a,b,c$ you get three points of intersection $P_a, P_b, P_c$ and the circle defined by those three points is the pedal circle. By definition the pedal circle is the circumcircle of the pedal triangle.

For radius $r$ of the pedal circle the following formula holds with $R$ being the radius and $O$ being the center of the circumcircle:

$$r=\frac{|PA| \cdot |PB| \cdot |PC|}{2\cdot (R^2-|PO|^2)}$$

Note that the denominator in the formula turns 0 if the point $P$ lies on the circumcircle. In this case the three points $P_a, P_b, P_c$ determine a degenerated circle with an infinite radius, that is a line. This is the Simson line. If $P$ is the incenter of the triangle then the pedal circle is the incircle of the triangle and if $P$ is the orthocenter of the triangle the pedal circle is the nine-point circle.

If $P$ does not lie on the circumcircle then its isogonal conjugate $Q$ yields the same pedal circle, that is the six points $P_a, P_b, P_c$ and $Q_a, Q_b, Q_c$ lie on the same circle. Moreover, the midpoint of the line segment $PQ$ is the center of that pedal circle.

Griffiths' theorem states that all the pedal circles for points located on a line through the center of the triangle's circumcircle share a common (fixed) point.

Consider four points with no three of them being on a common line. Then you can build four different subsets of three points. Take the points of such a subset as the vertices of a triangle $ABC$ and the fourth point as the point $P$, then they define a pedal circle. The four pedal circles you get this way intersect in a common point.
