= Whitson (surname) =

Whitson is a surname. Notable people with the surname include:

- Beth Slater Whitson (1879–1930), American lyricist
- Ed Whitson (born 1955), American baseball player
- Frank Whitson (1877–1946), American film actor
- John Whitson (1558–1629), English merchant and politician
- Keith Whitson (born 1943), British banker
- Peggy Whitson (born 1960), American biochemist and astronaut
- Sam Whitson, American politician
- Tony Whitson (1885–1945), South African soccer player
