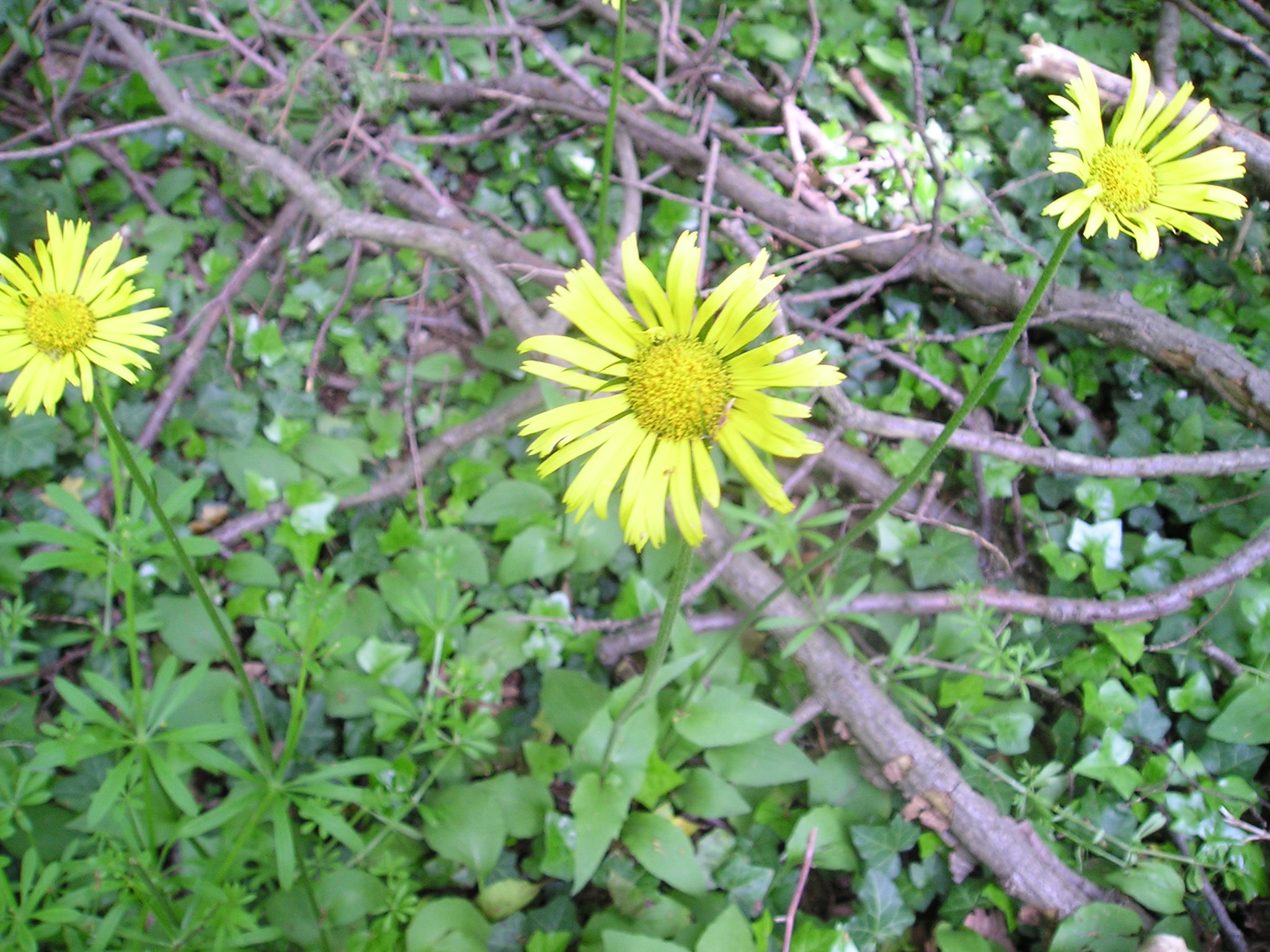
- Doronicum plantagineum

Scientific classification
- Kingdom: Plantae
- Clade: Tracheophytes
- Clade: Angiosperms
- Clade: Eudicots
- Clade: Asterids
- Order: Asterales
- Family: Asteraceae
- Subfamily: Asteroideae
- Tribe: Senecioneae
- Genus: Doronicum; L.

Synonyms
- Aronicum Neck. ex Rchb.; Fullartonia DC.; Grammarthron Cass.

= Doronicum =

Genus of flowering plants in the daisy family

Doronicum is a genus of flowering plants in the sunflower family, known as leopard's bane or leopardsbane. They are all herbaceous perennials native to Europe, southwest Asia and Siberia. They produce yellow, daisy-like flowerheads in spring and summer. The plants typically thrive in cool, mountainous regions and prefer well-drained soil with partial to full sunlight exposure. Due to their bright and vibrant flowers, Doronicum species are often cultivated as ornamental plants in gardens, particularly for early-season color.

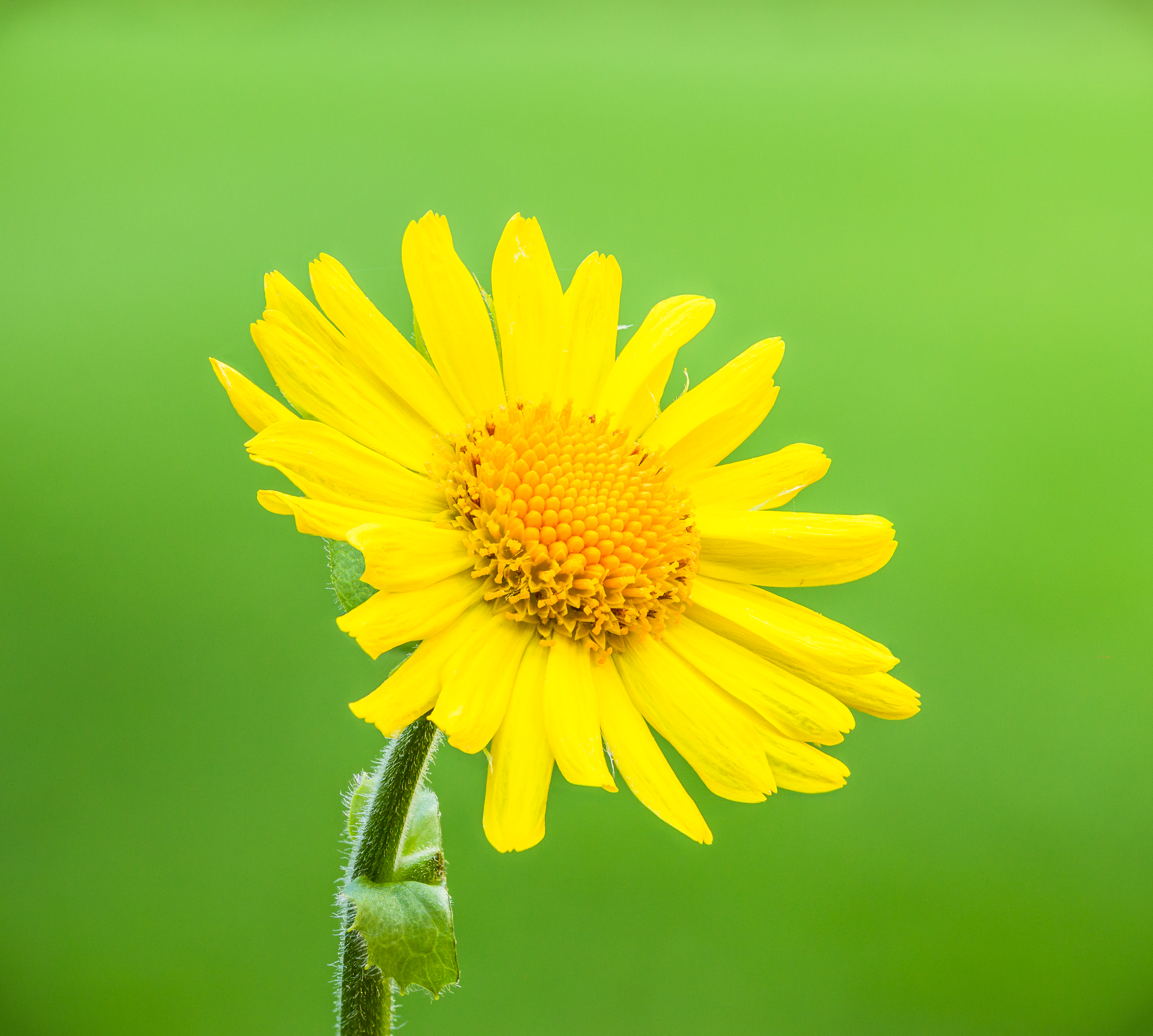
Inflorescence of a Doronicum orientale

Although the genus is often classified in the tribe Senecioneae, there is evidence that a classification elsewhere in the subfamily Asteroideae may be more appropriate.

Species

- Doronicum ×excelsum (N.E.Br.) Stace
- Doronicum ×halacsyi Eichenfeld
- Doronicum altaicum Pall
- Doronicum austriacum Jacq.
- Doronicum cacaliifolium Boiss. & Heldr.
- Doronicum calotum (Diels) Q.Yan
- Doronicum carpaticum (Griseb. & Schenk) Nyman
- Doronicum carpetanum Willk.
- Doronicum cataractarum Widder
- Doronicum caucasicum M.Bieb. – Leopard's bane
- Doronicum clusii (All.) Tausch
- Doronicum columnae Ten. – Eastern leopard's bane
- Doronicum conaense Y.L.Chen
- Doronicum corsicum (Loisel.) Poir.
- Doronicum dolichotrichum Cavill
- Doronicum falconeri C.B.Clarke ex Hook.f.
- Doronicum × fritschii Widder
- Doronicum glaciale (Wulfen) Nyman
- Doronicum × grafii Widder
- Doronicum grandiflorum Lam.
- Doronicum × halacsyi Eichenf.
- Doronicum haussknechtii Cavill.
- Doronicum hungaricum Rchb.f.
- Doronicum kamaonense (DC.) Alv.Fern.
- Doronicum macrophyllum Fisch.
- Doronicum maximum Boiss. & A.Huet
- Doronicum × minutilloi Peruzzi
- Doronicum oblongifolium DC.
- Doronicum pardalianches L. – Leopard's bane
- Doronicum × pardalianchoides Bornm. and Koch
- Doronicum plantagineum L. – Plantain-leaved leopard's bane
- Doronicum × prennii Widder
- Doronicum pyrenaicum (J.Gay ex Gren. & Godr.) Rivas Mart.
- Doronicum reticulatum Boiss.
- Doronicum stenoglossum Maxim
- Doronicum turkestanicum Cavill.
- Doronicum wendelboi J.R.Edm.
- Doronicum × willdenowii (Rouy) A.W.Hill

Doronicum bellidiastrum Sm. is a synonym for Bellis sylvestris.
