= Hugh Davies (botanist) =

Welsh botanist (1739–1821)

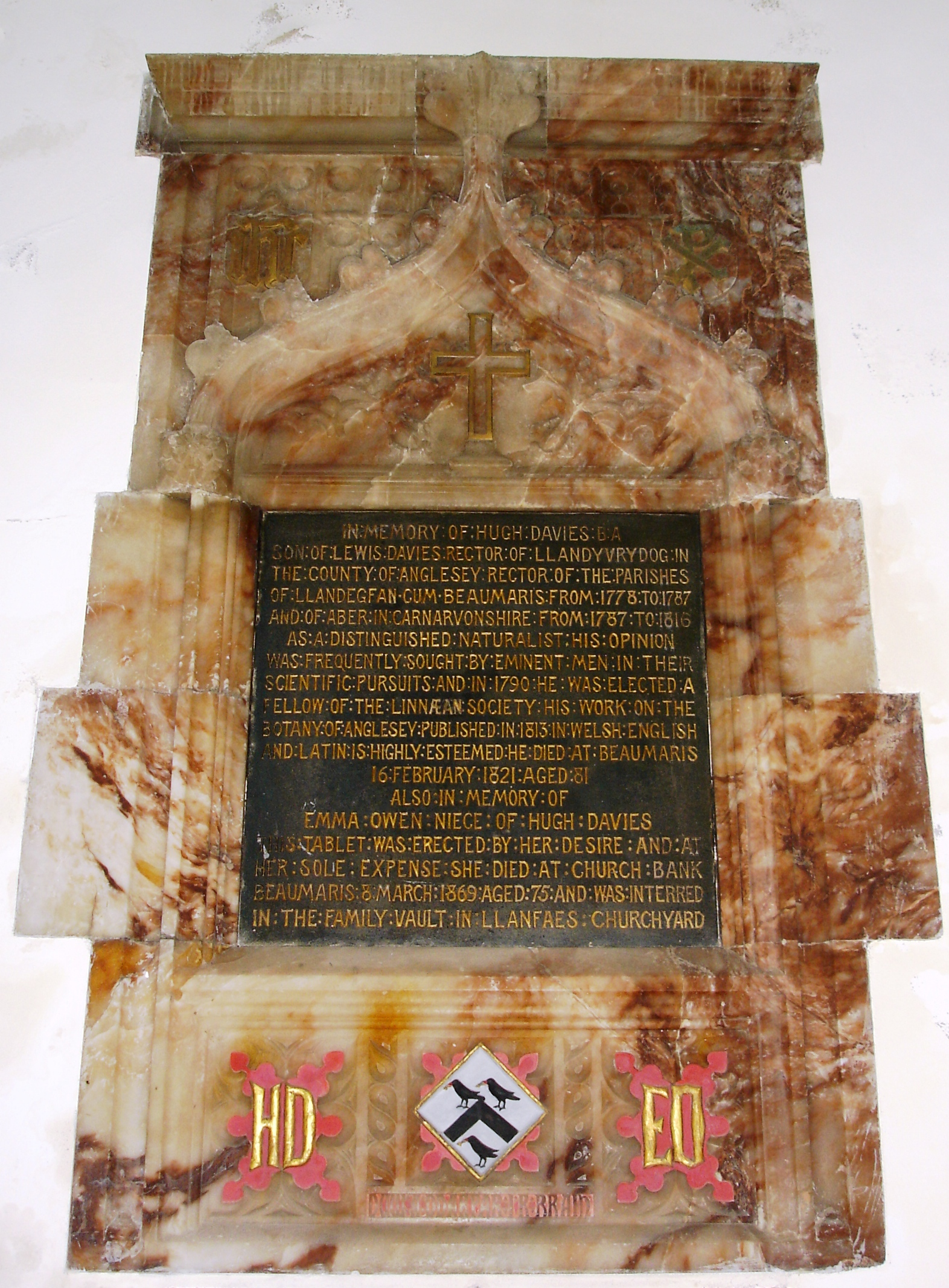
The memorial to Davies in St Mary's Church, Beaumaris

Hugh Davies (3 April 1739 – 16 February 1821) was a Welsh botanist and Anglican clergyman. He spent most of his professional life on the island of Anglesey and published a treatise on the flora of the county, which was the first volume to cross-reference plant names in the Welsh language with their scientific names.

== Life ==
Davies was born in the parish of Llandyfrydog, Anglesey, Wales, where his father was the rector of St Tyfrydog's Church, Llandyfrydog. He was educated at Beaumaris grammar school and then went to Oxford, studying at Jesus College as his father had done. He matriculated in 1757 and was awarded his Bachelor of Arts degree in 1762. After being ordained, he was a curate at Llangefni (1763–1766), Llanfaes and Penmon (1766–1785) and Penmynydd (1775–1778), all in Anglesey. He then became rector of Llandegfan with Beaumaris in 1778, before his appointment as rector of Aber, Caernarvonshire in 1787. He resigned in 1816, although he had lived in Beaumaris because of his health since 1801. He died in Beaumaris in 1821 and was buried in the churchyard.

== Botany ==
Davies was friends with Thomas Pennant from the time of his curacy in Llanfaes and Penmon, and would send him specimens. He travelled to the Isle of Man in 1774 with Pennant, returning the following year by himself for a further review of the plant life on the island. He thereafter assisted authors with details of the natural history of Anglesey and Caernarvonshire, contributing material to Pennant's books British Zoology, Indian Zoology and Journey to Snowdon, William Hudson's Flora Anglica, English Botany by James Sowerby and James Edward Smith, Flora Britannica by Smith, and The Botanist's Guide through England and Wales by Dawson Turner and Lewis Weston Dillwyn. He was elected a Fellow of the Linnean Society in 1790, with four of his papers being published in the society's journal. His main work was Welsh Botanology in 1813, which was the first work to cross-reference the names of plants in Welsh with their scientific names. Its treatment of the flora of Anglesey was also the first detailed consideration of the flora of a Welsh county, as opposed to the more common approach of that time of uncoordinated plant investigations. The book also contained what is still regarded as the most complete list of plant names in Welsh. Davies was commemorated by the genus Daviesia (Leguminosae), named after him by Smith in 1798.
