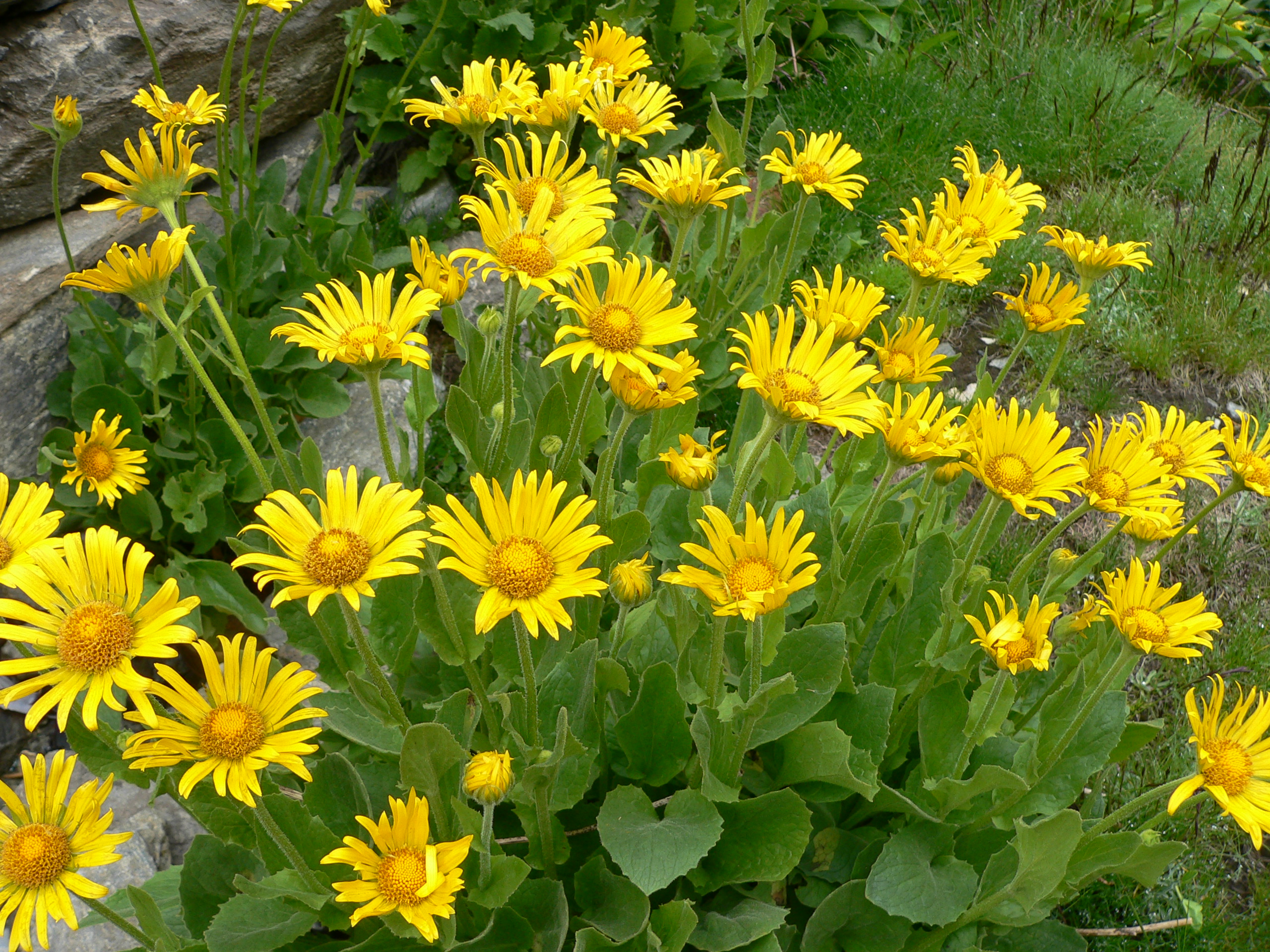

Scientific classification
- Kingdom: Plantae
- Clade: Tracheophytes
- Clade: Angiosperms
- Clade: Eudicots
- Clade: Asterids
- Order: Asterales
- Family: Asteraceae
- Genus: Doronicum
- Species: D. grandiflorum

Binomial name
- Doronicum grandiflorum Lam.

Synonyms
- List: Aronicum barcense; Aronicum carpathicum; Aronicum latifolium; Aronicum scorpioides; Aronicum scorpioideum; Aronicum viscosum; Doronicum ambiguum; Doronicum barcense; Doronicum carpathicum; Doronicum gracile; Doronicum halleri; Doronicum jacquinii; Doronicum plantagineum; Doronicum portae; Doronicum scorpioides; Doronicum viscosum; Senecio scorpioides

= Doronicum grandiflorum =

Plant species in the daisy family

Doronicum grandiflorum is a European species of Doronicum, a member of the family Asteraceae.

Doronicum grandiflorum is a perennial herb growing 10–40 cm. (4-16 inches) tall and producing numerous yellow flower heads borne singly on hairy stalks. The large, ovate (egg-shaped) ground-leaves have toothed edges and are supported by long, narrow petioles. The flower stems also bear leaves spaced alternately along the lower half of the stem. These hug the stem and are ovate to lanceolate. The leaves are densely beset with both glandular and non-glandular hairs. The flower heads are 4–6 cm. (1.5-2.5 in.) wide and have both yellow ray and disc flowers. Flowers appear from July through August.

== Taxonomy ==
Doronicum grandiflorum was given its scientific name in 1786 by Jean-Baptiste Lamarck. It is classified in the genus Doronicum as part of the family Asteraceae. According to Plants of the World Online it has 23 heterotypic synonyms.

Table of Synonyms
Name	Year	Rank	Notes
Aronicum barcense Simonk.	1887	species	
Aronicum carpathicum Schur	1859	species	
Aronicum latifolium Rchb.	1831	species	
Aronicum scorpioides DC.	1838	species	
Aronicum scorpioideum St.-Lag.	1880	species	
Aronicum viscosum Freyn & Gaut.	1881	species	
Doronicum ambiguum Rouy	1903	species	
Doronicum barcense Cavill.	1911	species	
Doronicum carpathicum Nyman	1865	species	
Doronicum gracile Schur	1866	species	
Doronicum grandiflorum proles ambiguum Rouy	1903	proles	
Doronicum grandiflorum proles approximatum Rouy	1903	proles	
Doronicum grandiflorum subsp. braunblanquetii Rivas Mart., T.E.Díaz, Fern.Prieto, Loidi & Penas	1984	subspecies	
Doronicum grandiflorum var. viscosum (Freyn & Gaut.) P.Fourn.	1939	variety	
Doronicum grandiflorum proles viscosum (Freyn & Gaut.) Rouy	1903	proles	
Doronicum halleri Tausch	1828	species	
Doronicum jacquinii Tausch	1828	species	
Doronicum plantagineum Roth	1788	species	sensu auct.
Doronicum portae Chabert	1906	species	
Doronicum scorpioides Lam.	1786	species	
Doronicum scorpioides Willd.	1803	species	nom. illeg.
Doronicum viscosum (Freyn & Gaut.) Nyman	1889	species	
Senecio scorpioides Sch.Bip.	1845	species	

== Distribution and habitat ==
This species is found growing in limestone rubble and gravel, such as that on eroding mountain slopes. It is native to mountainous regions between 1400 and 3400 m in altitude in the Alps, Pyrenees and northern Balkans (nations of Spain, France, Germany, Italy, Switzerland, Austria, Greece, Albania, Romania, and the western Balkans).
