= John Whiston =

British chemist

John Reginald Harvey Whiston OBE (3 January 1893 – 1956) was Associate Professor of Applied Chemistry at the Royal Military College of Science, with a particular interest in explosives.

== Life ==
Whiston grew up in Nottingham before studying at Jesus College, Oxford. He was commissioned as a Second Lieutenant on 3 October 1914, having previously been a Cadet Serjeant in the Senior Division of the Oxford University Contingent of the Officers Training Corps. He served in the Royal Air Force during the First World War and was a member of the scientific staff at Netheravon. In 1922, Whiston joined the chemistry department of the Royal Military College of Science, becoming Associate Professor in 1936. After the Second World War, he became Associate Professor of Applied Chemistry, a new post. He was also active in the work of the Institution of Professional Civil Servants. He specialized in the study of service explosives. He published papers with, amongst others, David Chapman, the Chemistry Fellow at Jesus College. He was made an Officer of the Order of the British Empire. His obituary in The Times on 5 March 1956 noted that he had "died recently at the age of 63."
