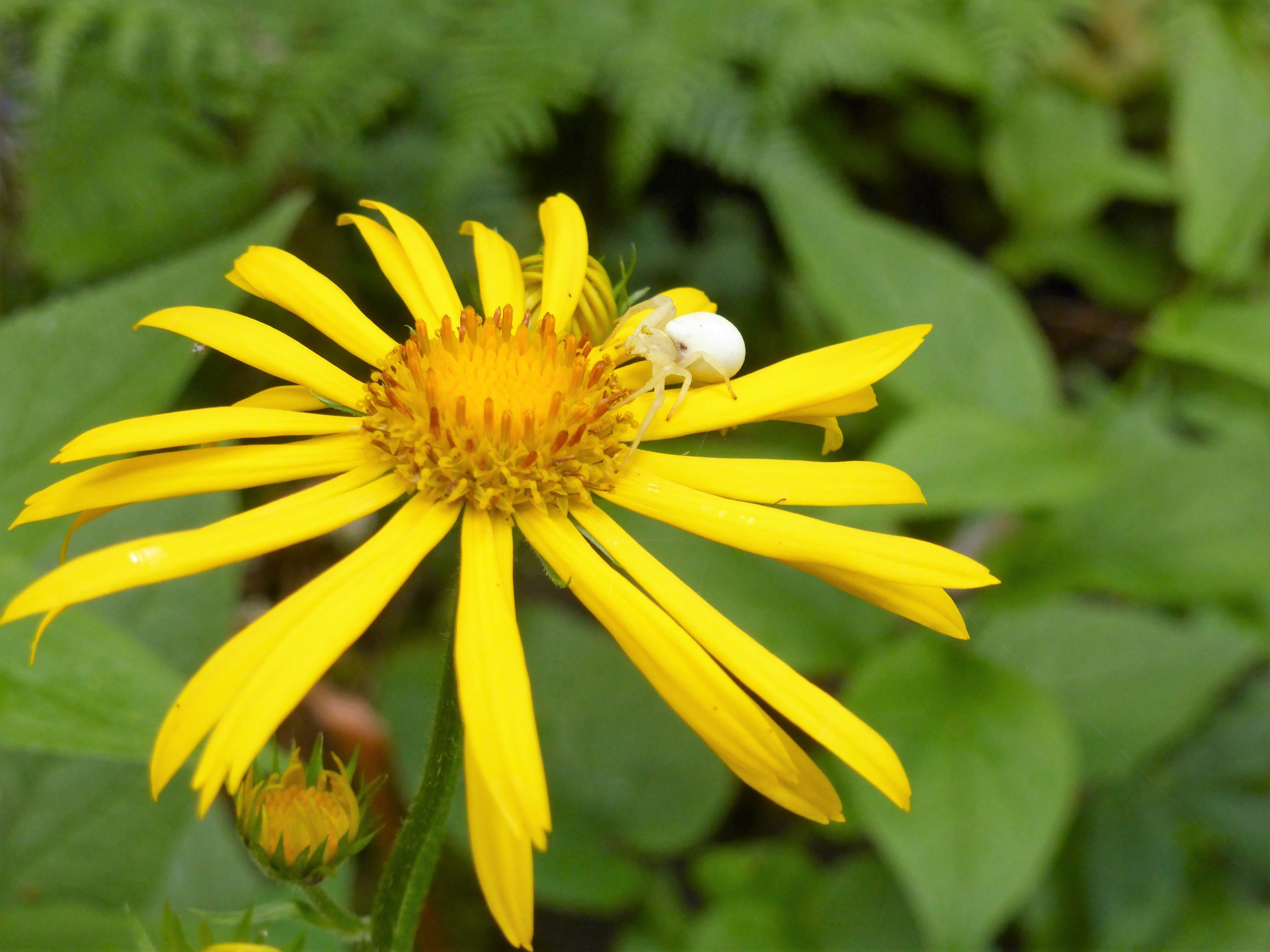
- Flower with spider
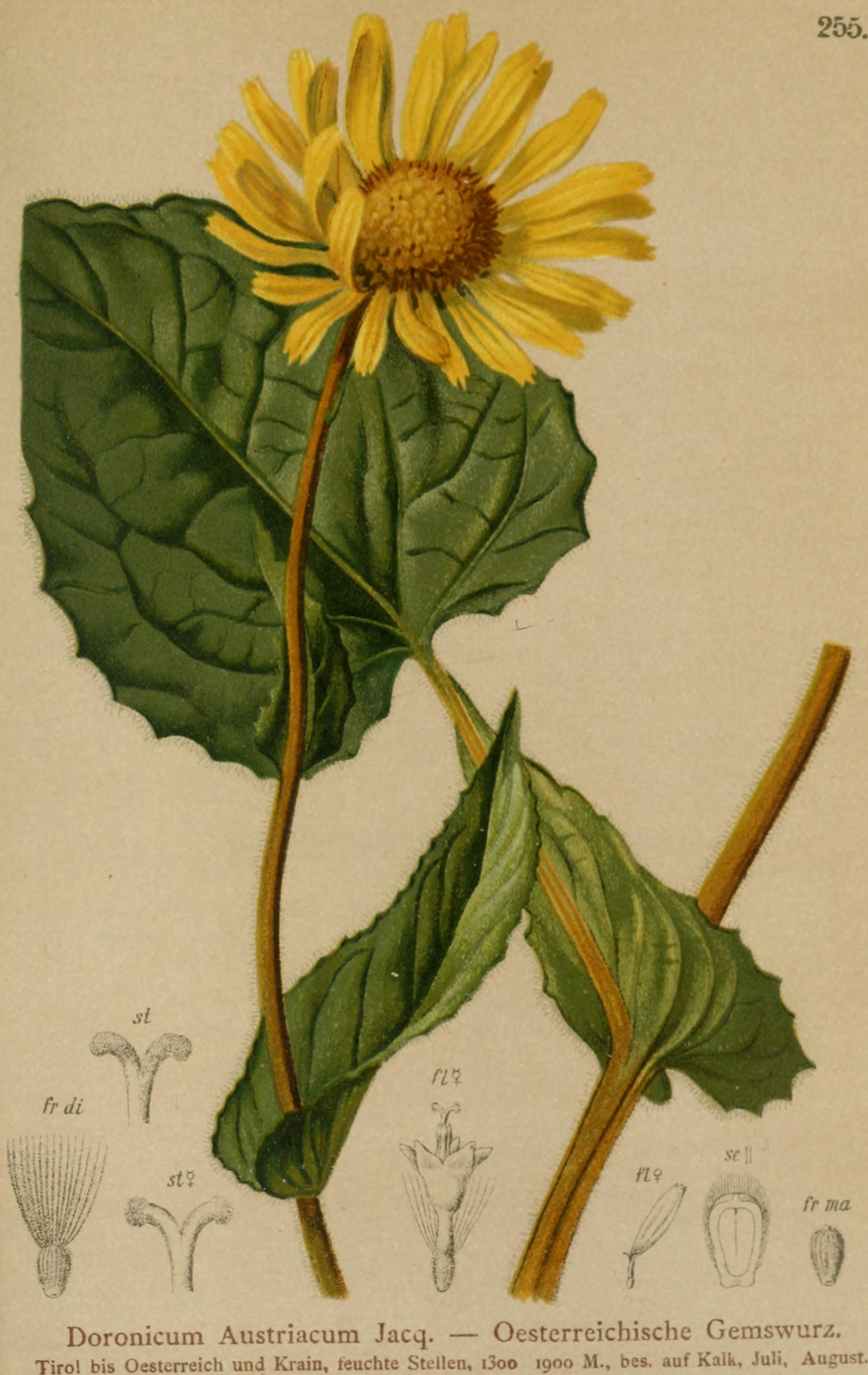
- Botanical illustration

Scientific classification
- Kingdom: Plantae
- Clade: Tracheophytes
- Clade: Angiosperms
- Clade: Eudicots
- Clade: Asterids
- Order: Asterales
- Family: Asteraceae
- Genus: Doronicum
- Species: D. austriacum

Binomial name
- Doronicum austriacum Jacq.

Synonyms
- List: Arnica austriaca (Jacq.) Hoppe ex Schur; Doronicum austriacum f. longisepala Gajić; Doronicum austriacum f. monocephala Gajić; Doronicum longifolium Rchb.; Doronicum subalpinum Schur; Doronicum pardalianches var. giganteum Griseb.; Doronicum orphanidis Boiss.; Senecio austriacus (Jacq.) E.H.L.Krause

= Doronicum austriacum =

Species of flowering plant

Doronicum austriacum, the Austrian leopard's bane, is a species of flowering plant in the family Asteraceae. It is native to Europe and Turkey, and prefers to grow in beech and spruce forests. A clumping perennial reaching 120 cm (47 in), it is available from commercial suppliers, with the Royal Horticultural Society considering it to be a good plant to attract pollinators.

== Subtaxa ==
The following subspecies are accepted:

- Doronicum austriacum subsp. austriacum – entire range, except Turkey
- Doronicum austriacum subsp. giganteum (Griseb.) Stoj. & Stef. – Turkey and the Balkans
