= Wiston =

Wiston may refer to the following places in the United Kingdom:

- Wiston, Pembrokeshire, Wales
  - Wiston Castle
- Wiston, South Lanarkshire, Scotland
- Wiston, Suffolk, England
- Wiston, West Sussex, England
  - Wiston House
