= Wistow =

Wistow may refer to:

- Wistow, Cambridgeshire, England
- Wistow, Leicestershire, England
- Wistow, North Yorkshire, England
- Wistow, South Australia
