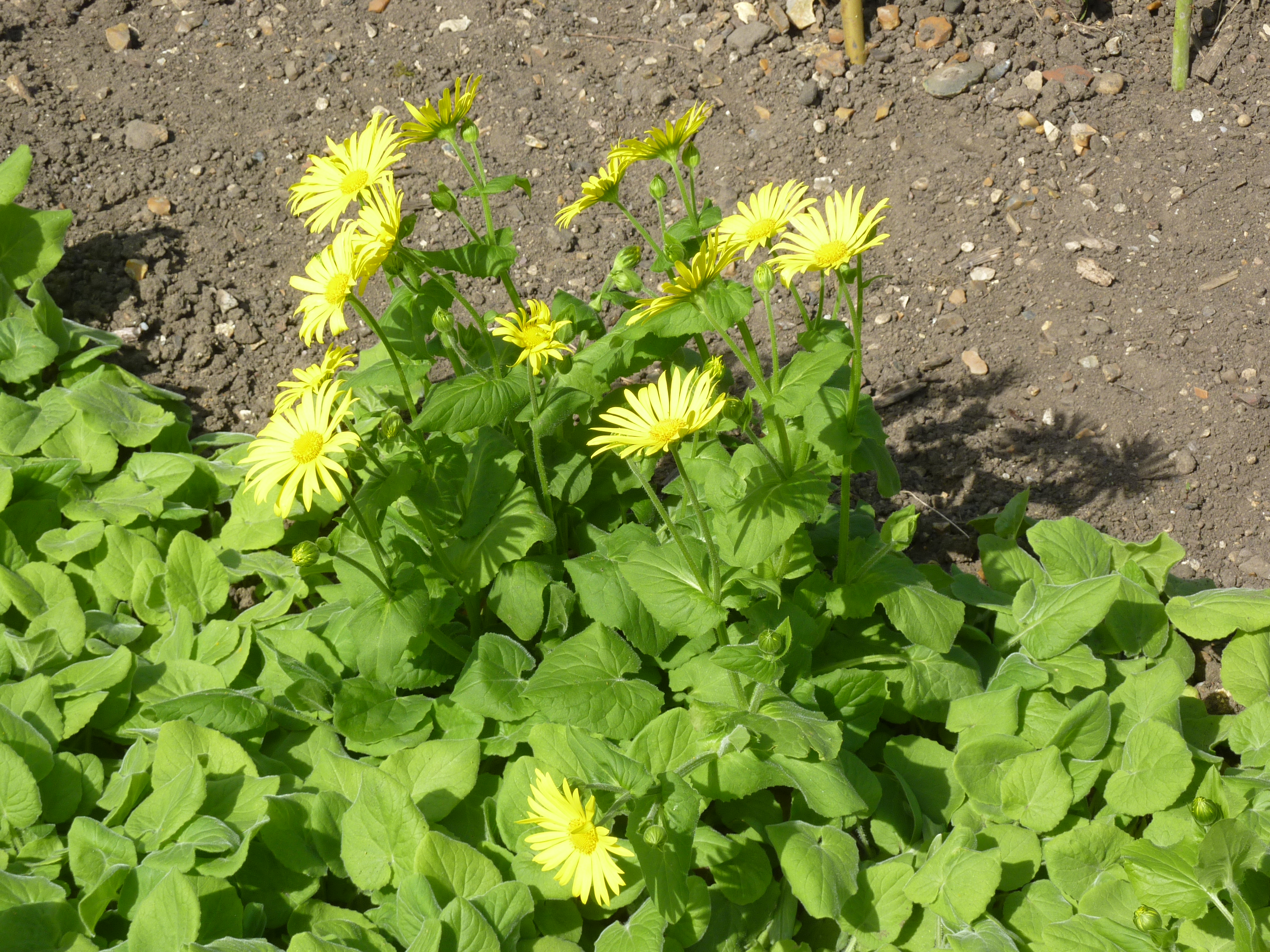

Scientific classification
- Kingdom: Plantae
- Clade: Embryophytes
- Clade: Tracheophytes
- Clade: Angiosperms
- Clade: Eudicots
- Clade: Asterids
- Order: Asterales
- Family: Asteraceae
- Genus: Doronicum
- Species: D. pardalianches

Binomial name
- Doronicum pardalianches L.

= Doronicum pardalianches =

Species of flowering plant in the daisy family

Doronicum pardalianches, known as leopard's-bane, is a species of flowering plant in the family Asteraceae. Like other members of the genus Doronicum, it is a rhizomatous herbaceous perennial. It has upright stems growing to 80 cm (31 in), with heart-shaped basal leaves and yellow flowers, generally 3–4.5 cm (1.2–1.8 in) across. It is native to western Europe and was introduced to the British Isles, where it was first recorded in Northumberland in 1633.

== Taxonomy ==
Doronicum pardalianches was given its scientific name in 1753 by Carl Linnaeus. It is part of the genus Doronicum which is classified in the family Asteraceae. According to Plants of the World Online it has twelve synonyms and no subspecies.

Table of Synonyms
Name	Year	Notes
Arnica alpina Salisb.	1796	= het., nom. superfl.
Arnica scorpioides L.	1753	= het.
Aster scorpioides (L.) Scop.	1771	= het.
Doronicum cordatum Lam.	1779	≡ hom., nom. superfl.
Doronicum cordifolium Stokes	1812	= het.
Doronicum latifolium Bubani	1899	= het.
Doronicum matthioli Tausch ex Rchb.	1831	= het.
Doronicum procurrens Dumort.	1827	= het.
Doronicum scorpioides Lapeyr. ex Willk. & Lange	1865	= het., not validly publ.
Doronicum toxicarium Salisb.	1796	= het.
Grammarthron scorpioides (L.) Cass.	1821	= het.
Senecio pardalianches E.H.L.Krause	1900	= het.
Notes: ≡ homotypic synonym; = heterotypic synonym
