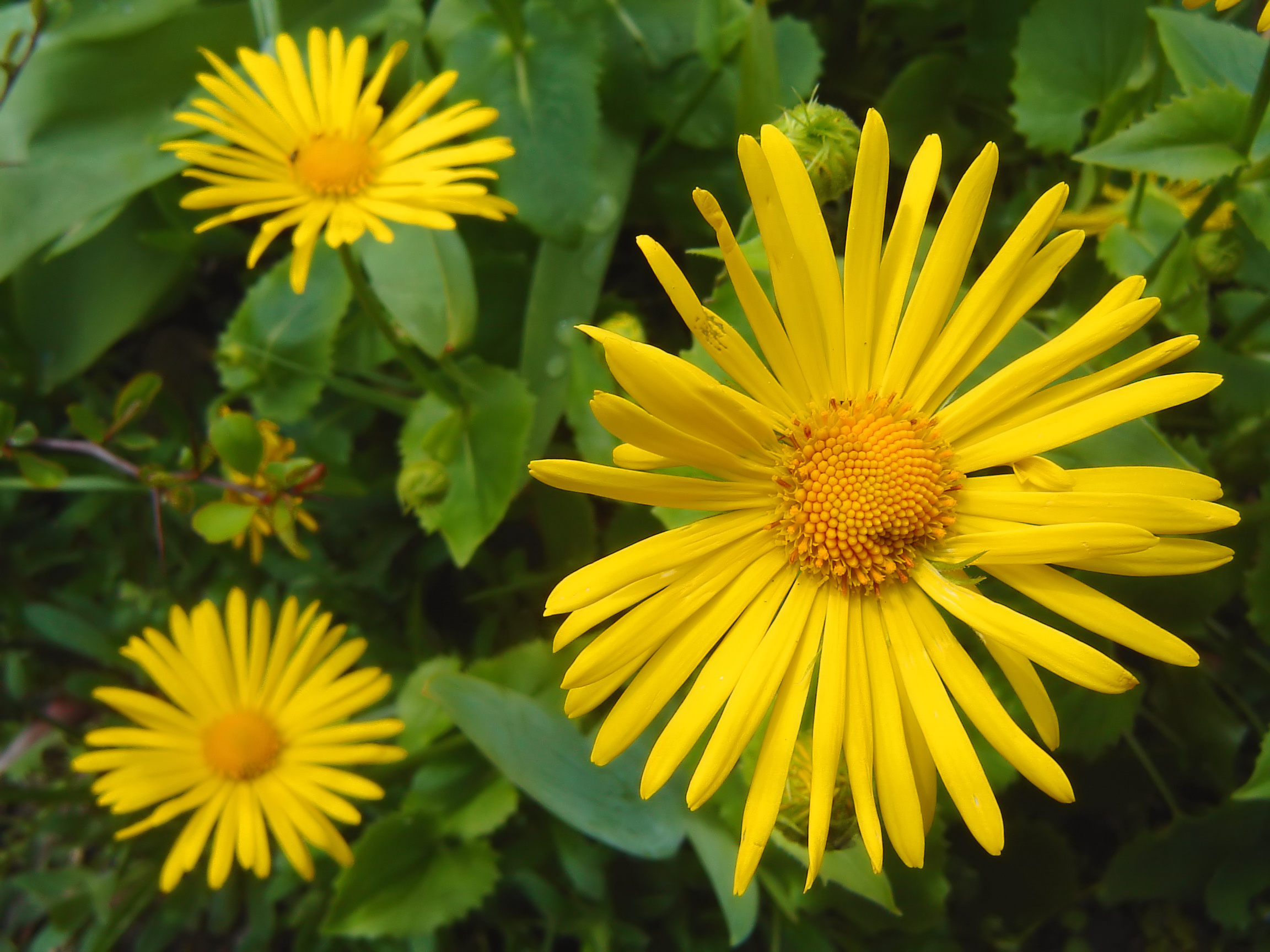

Scientific classification
- Kingdom: Plantae
- Clade: Tracheophytes
- Clade: Angiosperms
- Clade: Eudicots
- Clade: Asterids
- Order: Asterales
- Family: Asteraceae
- Genus: Doronicum
- Species: D. orientale

Binomial name
- Doronicum orientale Hoffm.

Synonyms
- Arnica cordata Wulfen; Doronicum caucasicum M.Bieb.

= Doronicum orientale =

Leopard's bane

Species of plant

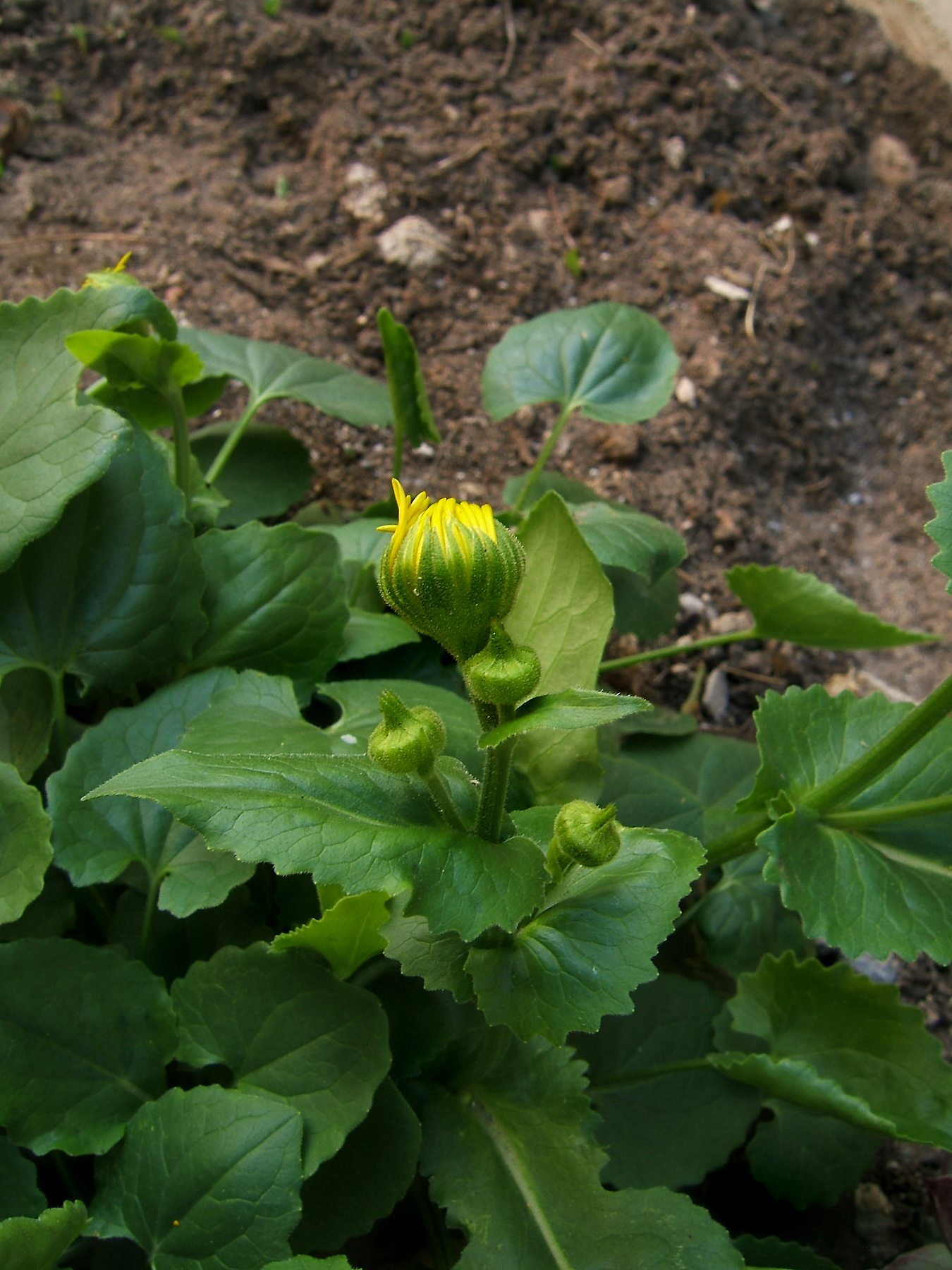
Emerging flower buds

Doronicum orientale, the Oriental leopard's bane, is a European plant species in the family Asteraceae.

== Description ==
Doronicum orientale is a perennial herb that has daisy-like yellow flower heads on long, straight stems, which attract nectar-eating insects. The plants grow to approximately 2 feet (60 cm) tall. The basal foliage is bright green with cordate leaves that have scalloped margins. Its native habitats include moist, rocky outcrops and woodland areas.

== Etymology ==
The specific epithet "orientale," means "eastern" and is in reference to its native range of eastern Europe, not eastern Asia.

== Distribution ==
It is native to southeastern Europe (Italy, Greece, the Balkans, Hungary, Moldova, Ukraine, southern European Russia) and parts of southwest Asia (Turkey, South Caucasus).

== Cultivation ==
Doronicum orientale is widely cultivated as an ornamental. There are a few reports of the species having escaped cultivation and been found growing wild in parts of Canada, but the plant apparently failed to become established there. D. orientale is a hardy (to zone 3) perennial, blooming in early spring. It likes both shade and sun and is easily grown in moist, fertile soil. The plant attracts butterflies. Cultivars include 'Little Leo', which is semi-double.

== Toxicity ==
All parts of this plant are poisonous to humans.
