= List of principals and fellows of Jesus College, Oxford =

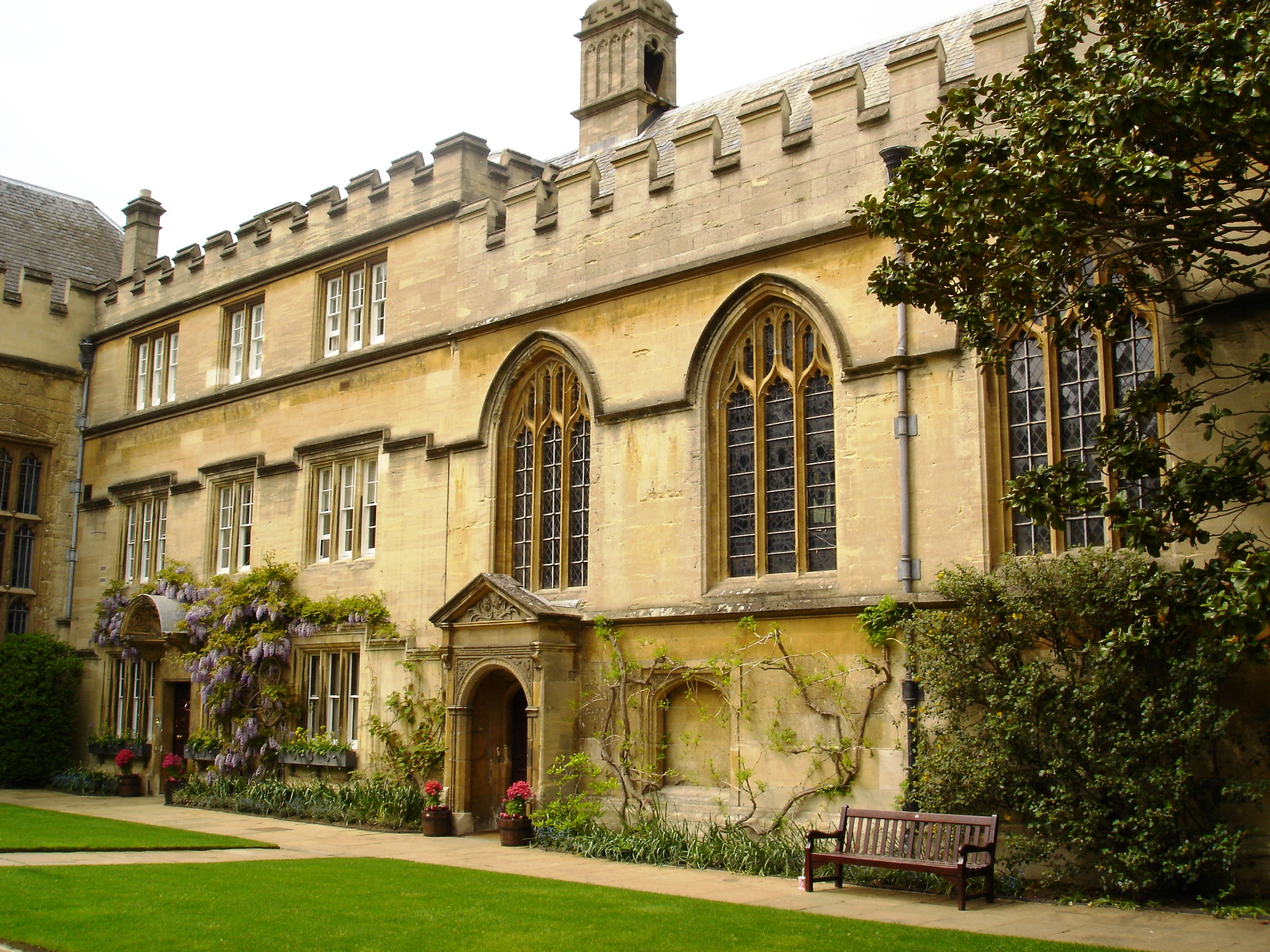
The Principal's lodgings (left) and the chapel (right) are located within the First Quad of Jesus College.

Jesus College, Oxford, one of the constituent colleges of the University of Oxford, is run by the principal and fellows of the college. The principal of the college must be "a person distinguished for literary or scientific attainments, or for services in the work of education in the University or elsewhere". The principal has "pre-eminence and authority over all members of the College and all persons connected therewith" and exercises "a general superintendence in all matters relating to education and discipline". The current principal, Sir Nigel Shadbolt, was appointed in 2015 and is the thirty-first holder of the office. This figure does not include Seth Ward, who was elected principal by the fellows in 1657 but never installed; Oliver Cromwell, Chancellor of the University at the time, appointed Francis Howell instead. Fourteen Principals have been former students of the college, the first being Griffith Powell, elected in 1613, and the most recent being Alfred Hazel, elected in 1925. The longest-serving Principal was Henry Foulkes, from 1817 to 1857.

When the college was founded in 1571 by Queen Elizabeth I, the first charter installed David Lewis as principal and named eight others as the first fellows. The statutes of 1622 allowed for 16 fellows. There is now no limit on the number of fellowships that the governing body can create. The college statutes provide for various categories of fellows. Professorial fellows are those professors and readers of the university who are allocated to the college by the university. One of these professorships is the Jesus Professor of Celtic, which is the only chair in Celtic studies at an English university. Holders of the position since its creation in 1877 include John Rhys, Ellis Evans and Thomas Charles-Edwards. The zoologists Charles Godfray and Paul Harvey are both professorial fellows. Official fellows are those who hold tutorial or administrative appointments in the college. Past official fellows include the composer and musicologist John Caldwell, the historians Sir Goronwy Edwards and Niall Ferguson, the philosopher Galen Strawson and the political philosopher John Gray. There are also senior and junior research fellows. Principals and fellows who retire can be elected as emeritus fellows. The college can also elect "distinguished persons" to honorary fellowships.

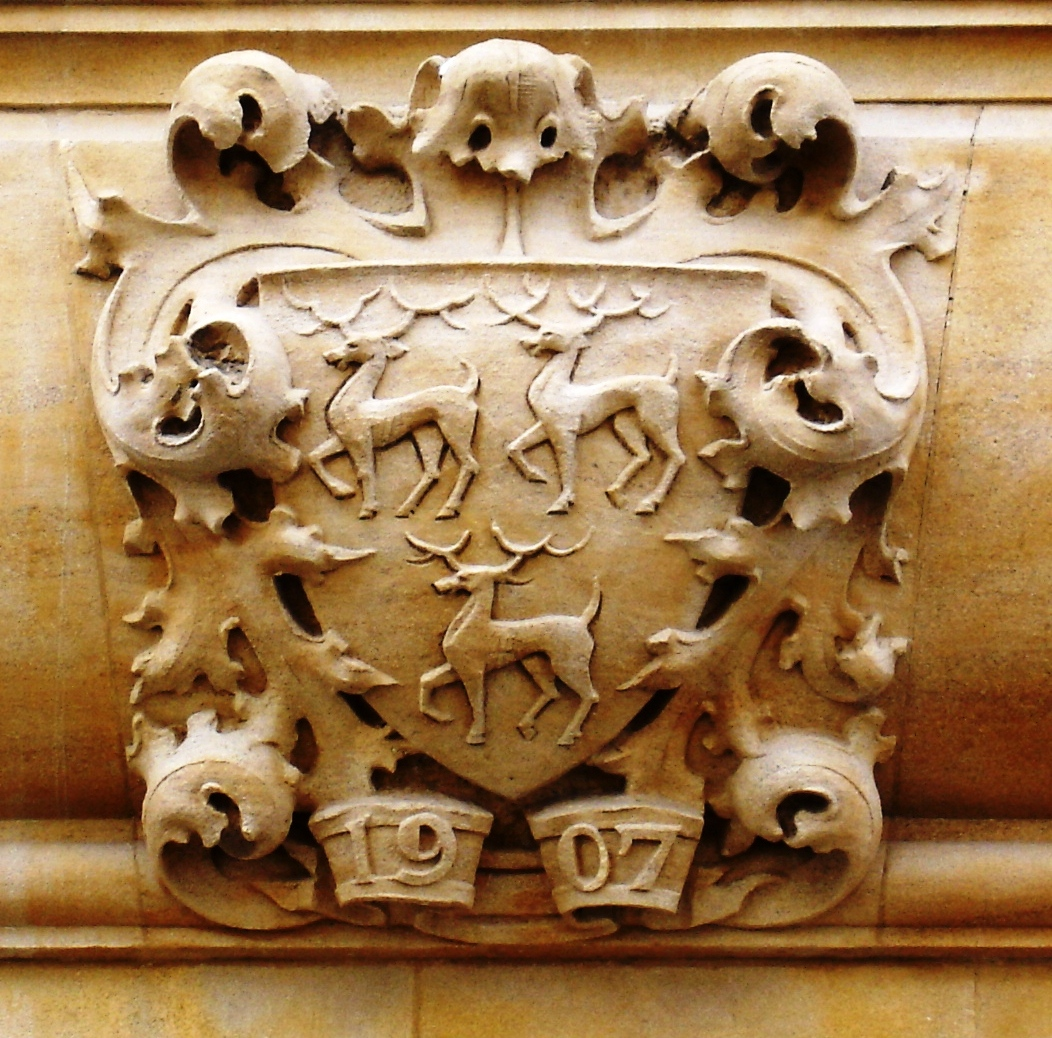
The college crest above the Ship Street entrance gate

A further category is that of Welsh supernumerary fellows, who are, in rotation, the vice-chancellors of Cardiff University, Swansea University, Lampeter University, Aberystwyth University, Bangor University and the University of Wales College of Medicine. There is one Welsh supernumerary fellow at a time, holding the position for not longer than three years. The first of these was John Viriamu Jones in 1897.

The college formerly had a category of missionary fellows, known as Leoline fellows after their founder, Principal Leoline Jenkins. In his will in 1685, he stated that "It is but too obvious that the persons in Holy Orders employed in his Majesty's fleet at sea and foreign plantations are too few." To address this, he established two fellowships, whose holders should serve as clergy "in any of his Majesty's fleets or in his Majesty's plantations" under the direction of the Lord High Admiral and the Bishop of London respectively. The last of these, Frederic de Winton, was appointed in 1876 and held his fellowship until his death in 1932. This category was abolished in 1877 by the Oxford and Cambridge Universities Commission, without prejudice to the rights of existing holders such as de Winton. Another category of fellowship that was abolished in the 19th century was that of the King Charles I fellows, founded by Charles I in 1636 and tenable by natives of the Channel Islands in an attempt by him to "reclaim the Channel Islands from the extreme Calvinism which characterised them." The first such Fellow was Daniel Brevint.

Whilst the founding charter did not require the fellows or the students to be Welsh, the college has long had strong associations with Wales. Between 1571 and 1915, only one principal (Francis Howell, 1657–1660) was not from Wales or of Welsh descent. Many of the fellows in the past were also Welsh, since when new fellowships were created by benefactions (often by people of Welsh descent) there was frequently a stipulation that the recipients would be related to the donor or come from a place in Wales specified by the donor. These specific limitations were removed as part of reforms of Oxford University during the 19th century.

== List of principals ==
Key:

- OM – An Old Member of the college who became a fellow, included in the list of alumni
- HF – An honorary fellow of the college, included in the list of honorary fellows

Name	Fellow	Principal	Notes	Ref
David Lewis	—	1571–72	First Principal; Fellow of All Souls, former principal of New Inn Hall, Oxford, a judge of the High Court of Admiralty from 1558	
Griffith Lloyd	—	1572–86	Second Principal, and one of the first benefactors to leave land to the college in his will	
Francis Bevans	—	1586–1602	Chancellor to Herbert Westfaling (Bishop of Hereford), and spent much of his time as principal in Hereford, leaving Griffith Powell to run the college	
John Williams	1590–1602	1602–13	Lady Margaret Professor of Divinity (1594–1613) and Dean of Bangor (1605–1613)	
Griffith Powell (OM)	1589–1613	1613–20	First Jesus College student to become principal; as principal, he oversaw the building of the hall, buttery and kitchen, but died a year before the chapel was completed.	
Francis Mansell (OM)	—	1620–21; 1630–48; 1660–61	Altered and enlarged the college buildings during his second term of office	
Sir Eubule Thelwall	—	1621–30	Lawyer and MP for Denbighshire (1624–26 and 1628–29), called the "second founder" of Jesus College for his expenditure on the chapel and hall and for obtaining a new charter and statutes from King James I	
Michael Roberts	1625–37	1648–57	Principal during the English Commonwealth	
Seth Ward	—	1657	Elected Principal by the Fellows, but never held the position as Oliver Cromwell installed Francis Howell instead; he later became Bishop of Exeter and Bishop of Salisbury	
Francis Howell	—	1657–60	Principal during the English Commonwealth, and the only non-Welsh Principal between 1571 and 1921	
Sir Leoline Jenkins (OM)	1660–61	1661–73	Lawyer, diplomat and Secretary of State (1680–84)	
John Lloyd	1661–73	1673–86	Resigned as principal when appointed Bishop of St David's in October 1686, but died in early 1687	
Jonathan Edwards	1662–86	1686–1712	Theologian and Treasurer of Llandaff Cathedral; first principal to serve as Vice-Chancellor of Oxford University	
John Wynne (OM)	1687–1712	1712–20	Bishop of St Asaph (1715–27) and Bishop of Bath and Wells (1727–43)	
William Jones (OM)	1699–1707	1720–25	Left his Fellowship when appointed Rector of Longworth, Oxfordshire	
Eubule Thelwall	1702–25	1725–27	Succeeded William Jones as both Rector of Longworth and principal, but died just two years after his promotion	
Thomas Pardo (OM)	1711–27	1727–63	As Principal, completed the north-west corner of the inner quadrangle and carried out alterations to the hall and front of college	
Humphrey Owen (OM)	1725–63	1763–68	Bodley's Librarian (1747–68)	
Joseph Hoare (OM)	1734–62	1768–1802	First married principal, who donated £200 whilst principal for restoration of the Old Quadrangle	
David Hughes (OM)	1774–1802	1802–17	Donated money to increase the value of scholarships from South Wales and England, to reduce disparity with North Wales scholarships	
Henry Foulkes (OM)	1796–1817	1817–57	Longest-serving Principal in the history of the college	
Charles Williams (OM)	1829–45	1857–77	Former headmaster of Ruthin School and incumbent of Holyhead parish church	
Daniel Harper (OM)	1845–52	1877–95	Former headmaster of Cowbridge Grammar School and Sherborne School	
Sir John Rhys (OM/HF)	1881–95	1895–1915	First Jesus Professor of Celtic (1877–1915), honorary fellow (1877–81) and Bursar (1881–95)	
Ernest Hardy	1875–78; 1896–1921	1921–25	Classics tutor who wrote a history of the college (1899) and succeeded Rhys as principal after a vacancy of six years – the first non-Welsh Principal since Francis Howell (1657–60)	
Alfred Hazel (OM)	1898–1925	1925–44	Former Liberal MP, Fellow in Law and All Souls Reader in English Law (1933)	
Sir Frederick Ogilvie	—	1946–49	Director-General of the BBC (1938–42) before becoming principal	
John Christie (HF)	—	1949–67	Former headmaster of Repton and Westminster Schools	
Sir John Habakkuk (HF)	—	1967–84	Served as Vice-Chancellor of Oxford University (1973–77) whilst principal	
Sir Peter North (HF)	—	1984–2005	Served as Vice-Chancellor of Oxford University (1993–97) whilst principal	
John Krebs, Baron Krebs (HF)	—	2005–15	Zoologist, chairman of the Food Standards Agency (2000–05), appointed to the House of Lords as a cross-bencher in 2007	
Sir Nigel Shadbolt (HF)	—	2015–26	Professor of computer science at University of Oxford; chairman and co-founder of the Open Data Institute	
Lindsay Skoll	—	2026–present	First woman principal; British ambassador to Austria and UK permanent representative to the UN in Vienna (2021–26); appointed CMG in 2019	

== Other notable fellows ==
Key:

- OM – An Old Member of the college who became a Fellow, included in the list of alumni
- HF – An Honorary Fellow of the college, included in the list of Honorary Fellows

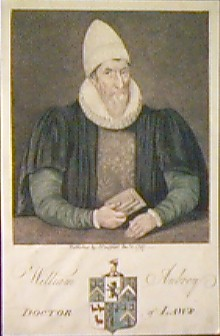
William Aubrey

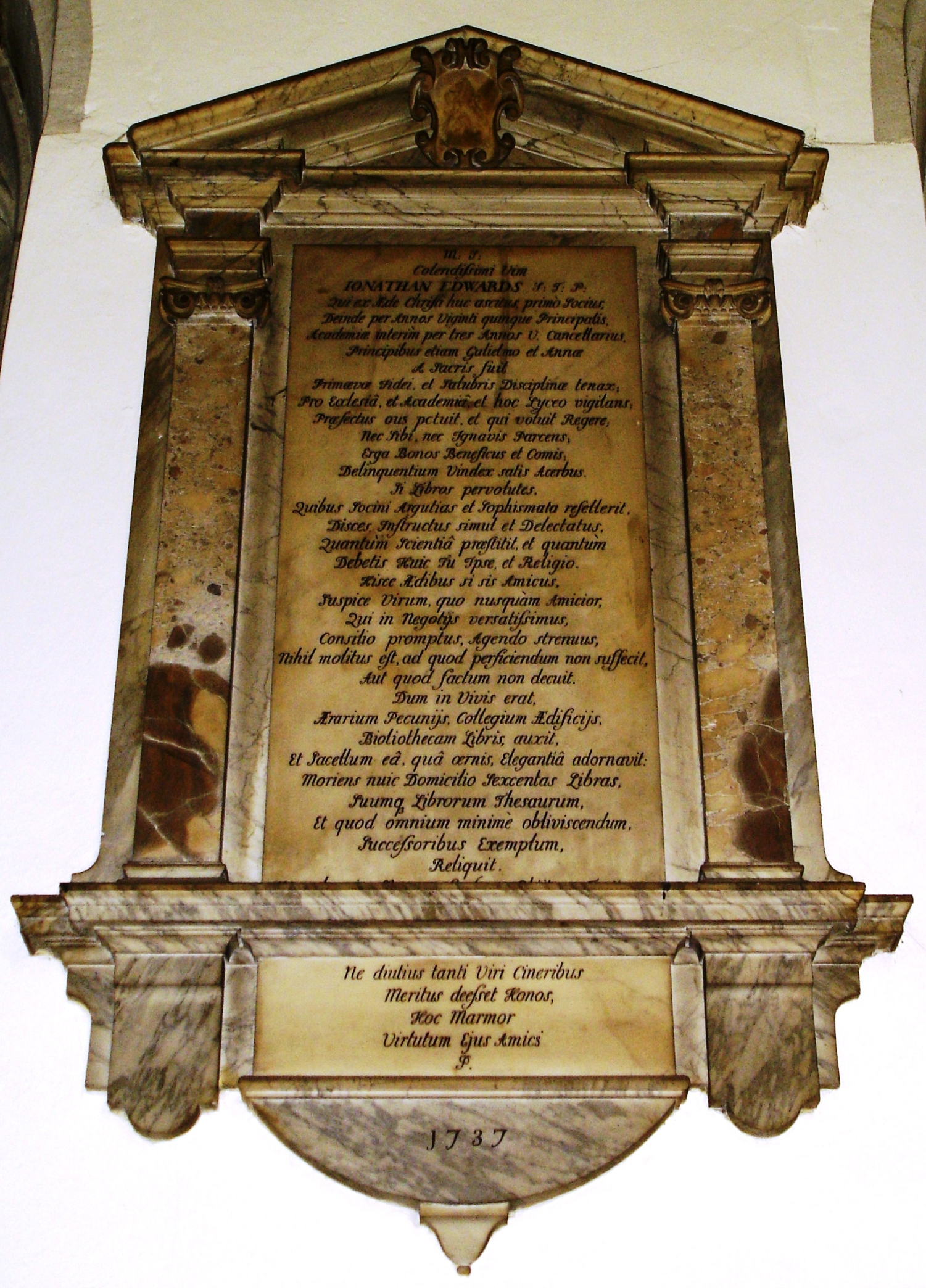
The college chapel memorial to Principal Jonathan Edwards

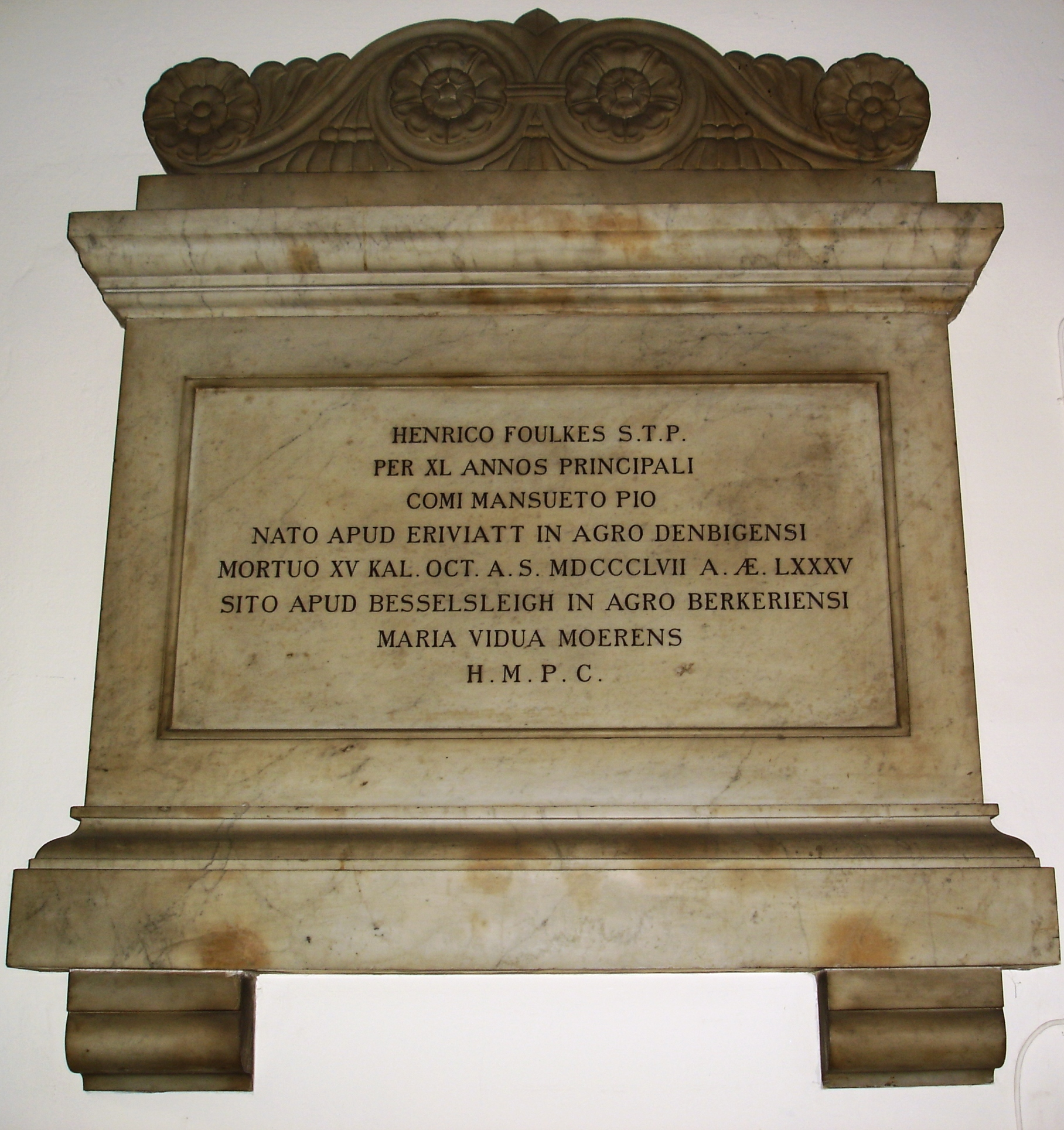
The college chapel memorial to Principal Henry Foulkes

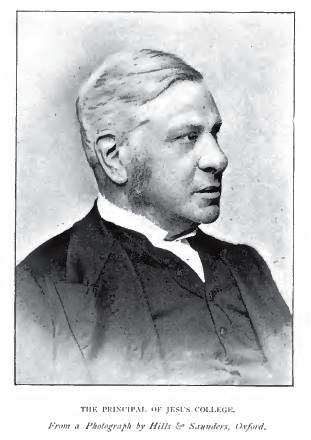
Daniel Harper

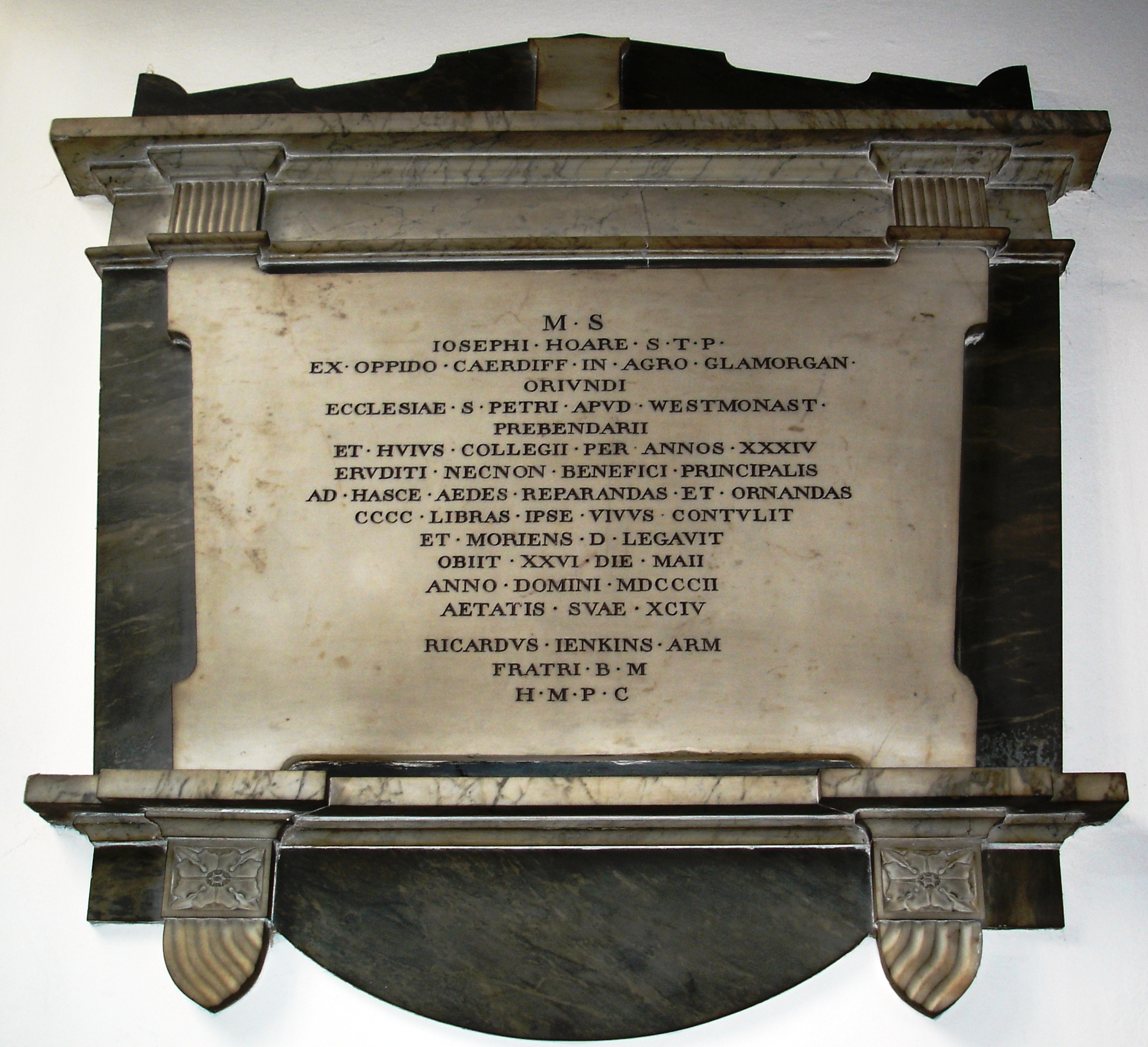
The college chapel memorial to Principal Joseph Hoare

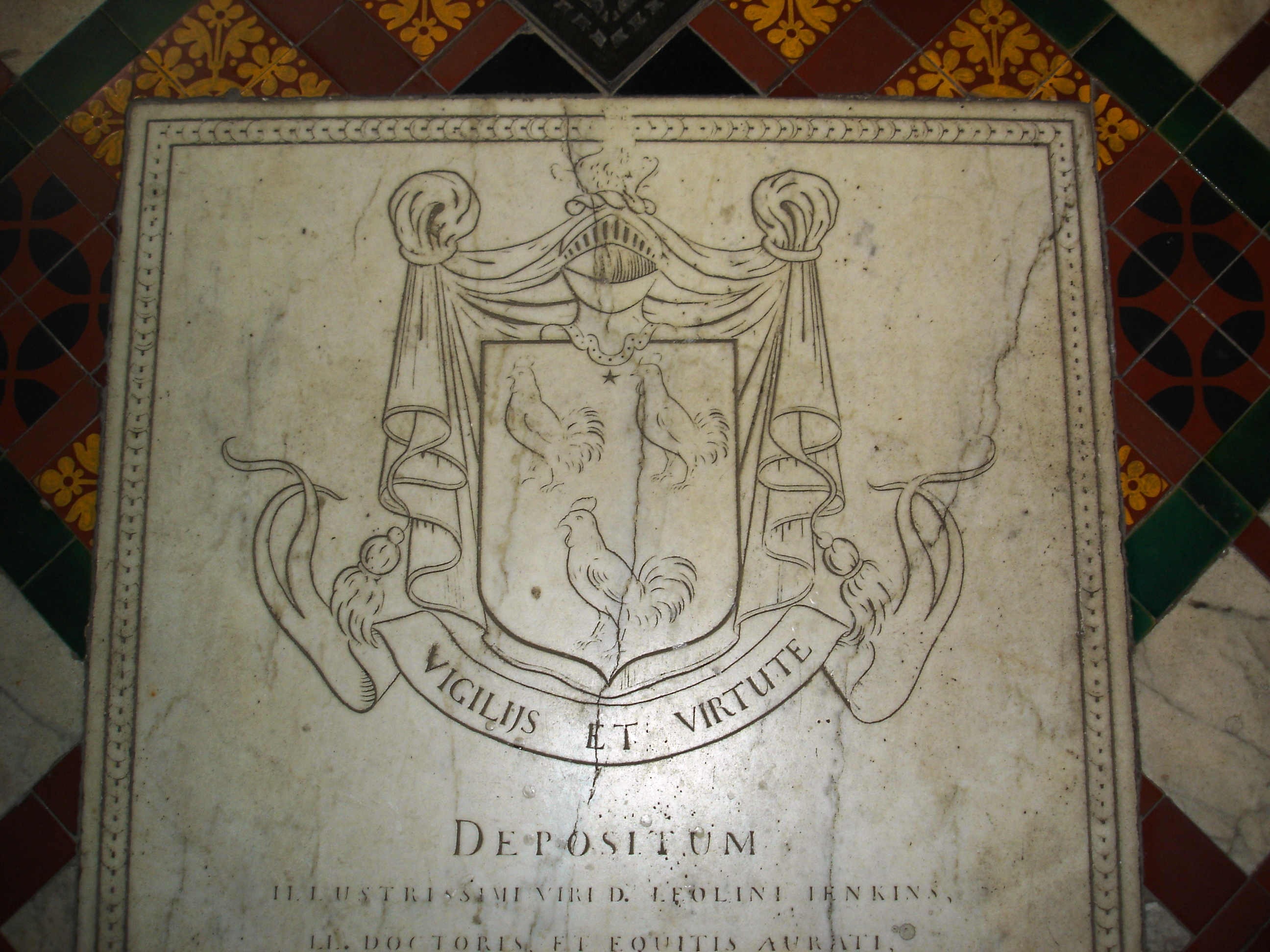
The college chapel tombstone of Principal Sir Leoline Jenkins

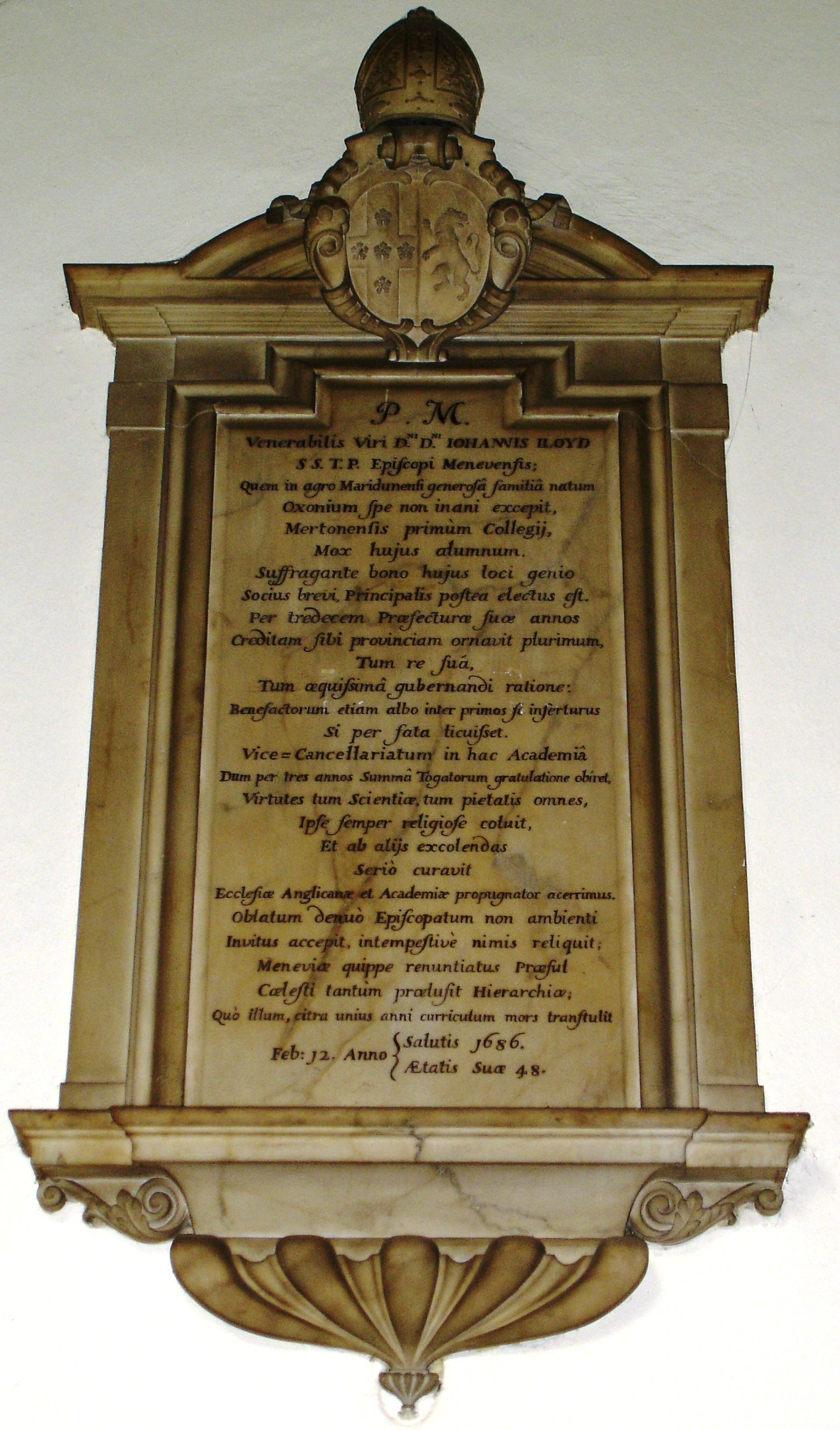
The college chapel memorial to Principal John Lloyd

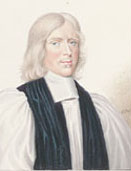
Bishop William Lloyd

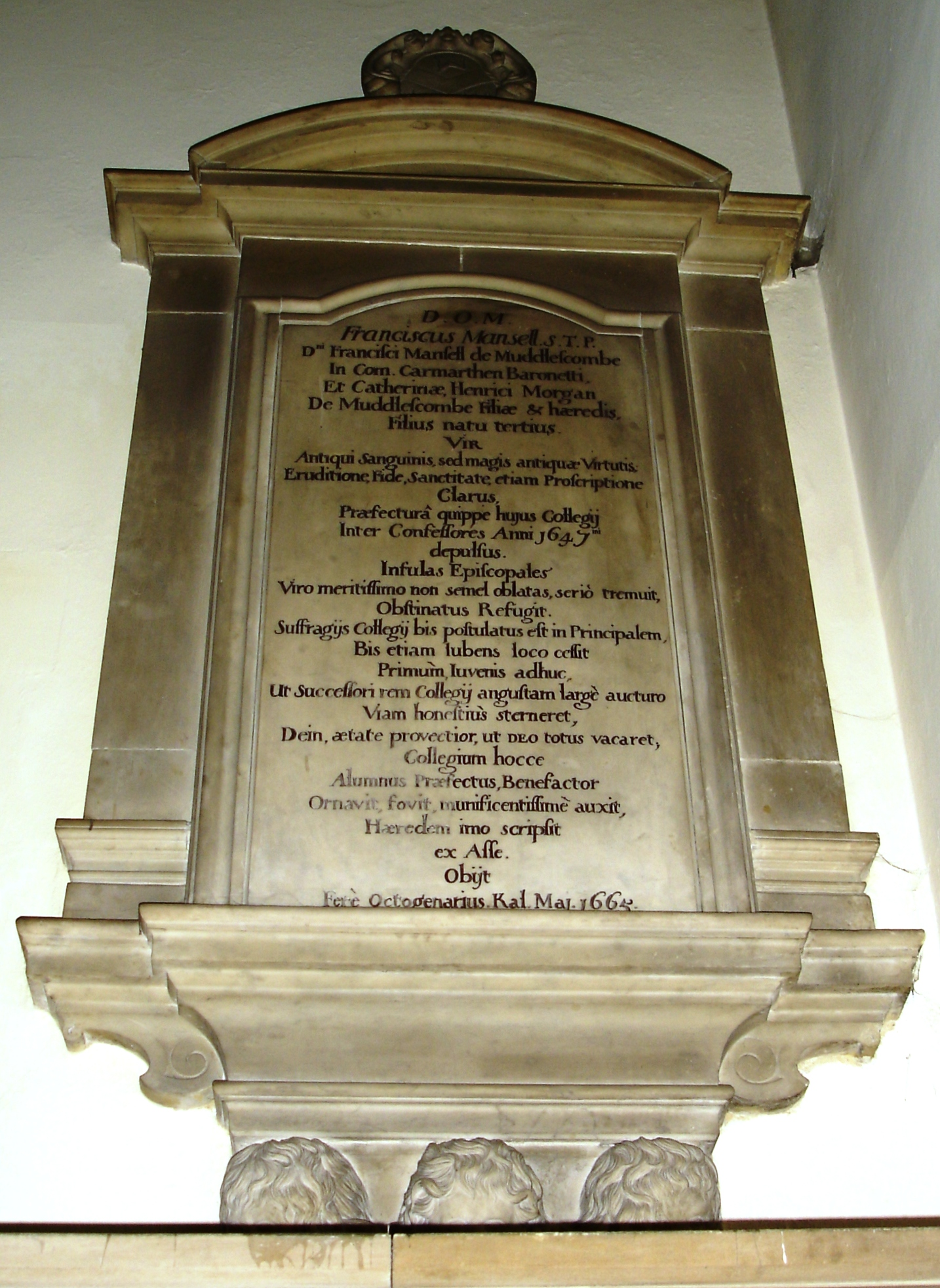
The college chapel memorial to Principal Francis Mansell

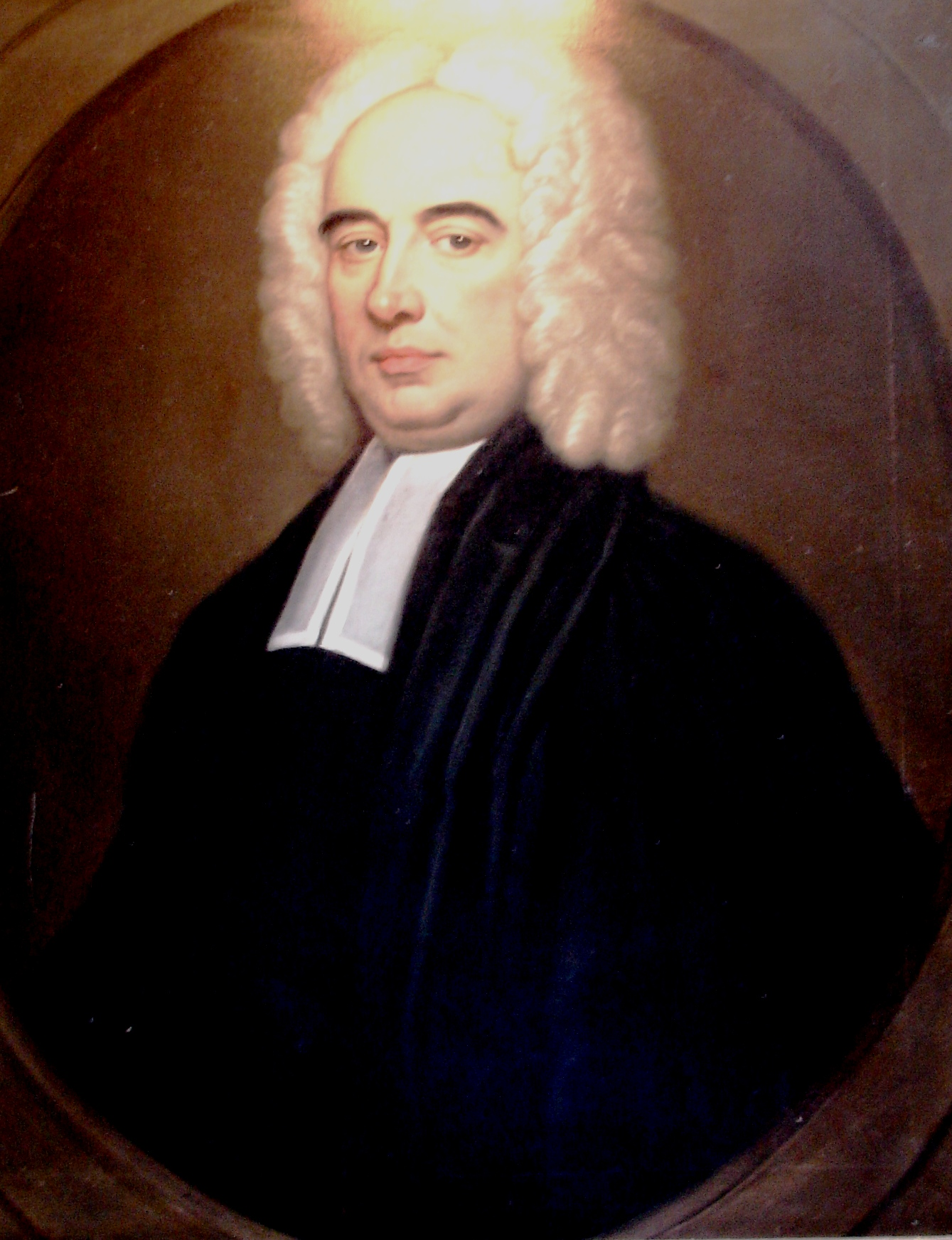
The portrait of Principal Thomas Pardo hangs in the college hall.

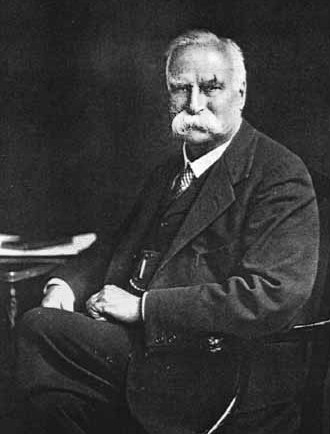
Sir Edward Bagnall Poulton

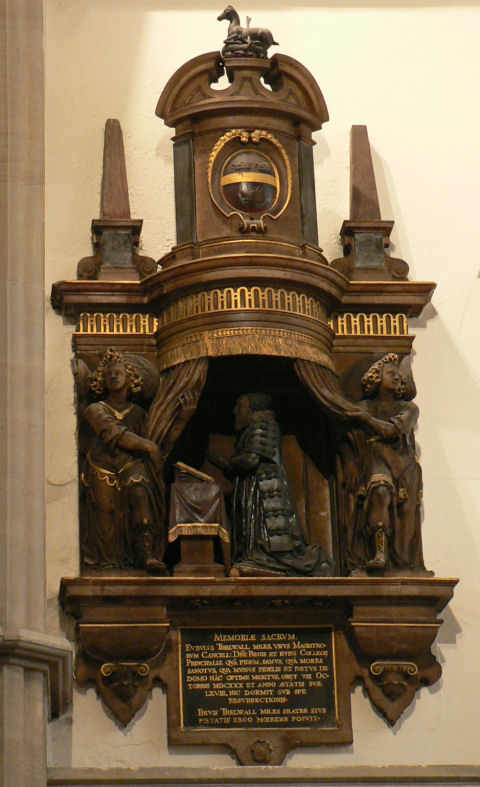
The college chapel memorial to Principal Sir Eubule Thelwall

Name	Fellow	Notes	Ref
David Acheson	1977	British applied mathematician and former president of the Mathematical Association	
Henry Archdall	1941	Australian priest and schoolteacher, who was a Welsh Supernumerary Fellow in his capacity as principal of St David's College, Lampeter	
Andrea Ashworth	1997–2000	Junior Research Fellow in English, who won the Somerset Maugham Award from the Society of Authors in 1999 for Once in a House on Fire, her autobiography about her traumatic childhood	
William Aubrey	1571–95	Regius Professor of Civil Law (1553–59), one of the eight original Fellows of the college	
J. N. L. Baker (OM)	1939–71	College Lecturer in Geography (1932–71) and Bursar (1939–62); Lord Mayor of Oxford (1964–65)	
James Bandinel (OM)	1754–76	University Proctor (1776) and Public Orator (1776–84)	
Peter Beer	1996–2006	Retired Air Vice-Marshal who held the college position of Home Bursar	
Colin Bennetts	1975–78	College chaplain for three years, later becoming Bishop of Coventry (1998–2008)	
Richard Bosworth	2011–present	Historian of the 20th century, appointed as a senior research fellow	
Henry Bould (OM)	1623–38	Named as one of the founding scholars in the college's third charter (1622) before becoming a Fellow	
Daniel Brevint	1637–48; 1660–62	The first holder of the Fellowship for Channel Islanders created by Charles I	
Thomas Briscoe (OM)	1834–59	Vice-Principal (1849–58), vicar of Holyhead (1858–95)	
Mark Brouard	1993–	Helen Morag Fellow and former head of Oxford University’s Department of Chemistry	
Clark L. Brundin (HF)	1963–85	Engineer who later became Vice-Chancellor of the University of Warwick (1985–92)	
John Caldwell	1999–2005	Musicologist and composer, who became an emeritus fellow on his retirement	
Brian Cantor	1987–95	Senior Research Fellow in Material Processing, Vice-Chancellor of the University of York since 2002	
G. D. Hale Carpenter	1933–48	Hope Professor of Entomology (1933–48), succeeding Sir Edward Bagnall Poulton	
Alan Carrington	1984–87	Professor of Chemistry 1984–87; a former Fellow of Downing College, Cambridge; Royal Society Research Professor at Southampton University (1979–84 and 1987–99); awarded the Faraday Lectureship Prize (1985) and Davy Medal (1992)	
David Chapman (HF)	1907–44	Physical chemist who ran the college laboratories (the last college labs in Oxford)	
Thomas Charles-Edwards	1997–2011	Jesus Professor of Celtic	
Arthur Church (OM)	1908–12	University Reader in Botany (1910–30), elected a Fellow of the Royal Society in 1921	
Patricia Clavin	2003–2021	Fellow and Tutor in History; winner of the 2015 British Academy Medal; Professor of Modern History at Worcester College, Oxford from 2021	
J. R. Cohu (OM)	1882–90	Clergyman, headmaster and writer on biblical topics	
John Cotterell	1571–75	Clergyman and former principal of White Hall and Laurence Hall, and one of the eight original Fellows of the college	
Keith Cox	1973–98	Geologist with a particular interest in flood basalts	
Patricia Crone	1979–90	Historiographer of early Islamic history	
Leslie Cross	1927–47	College chaplain and tutor in theology, Estates Bursar (1941–43) and senior tutor (1945–47); appointed an emeritus fellow in 1960	
Patricia Daley	1991–	Fellow and Tutor in Geography, Vice-Principal (2018-2021) and first Black person to hold a fellowship at Oxford	
Francis Davies (OM)	By 1640 – ?	Bishop of Llandaff (1667–75), who was reputedly a Fellow of the college, although the college's records do not substantiate this	
Paul Davies	2009–present	Allen & Overy Professor of Corporate Law since 2009; previously a Fellow of Balliol College then a professor at the London School of Economics	
Frederic de Winton	1876–32	The last Leoline Fellow; Archdeacon of Colombo (1902–25)	
Percy Dodd (OM)	1919–31	Classicist whose substantial bequest to the college is used to support non-academic travel by undergraduates	
Edward Edwards (OM)	1747–83	Welsh cleric and friend of Samuel Johnson, vice-principal (1762–83)	
Sir Goronwy Edwards (OM/HF)	1919–48	Welsh historian who served as senior tutor and vice-principal; left to become director of the Institute of Historical Research and professor of history at the University of London	
Jonathan Edwards (OM)	1636–48	Later Archdeacon of Derry	
William Edwards	1874–77	Later one of H.M. Inspectors of School in Wales for nearly 50 years	
John Ellis (OM)	1696–1713	Welsh cleric and antiquarian	
John Ellis	1628–31	Founder of Dolgellau Grammar School	
Thomas Ellis (OM)	1649–73	Fellow during and after the English Commonwealth, vice-principal under Francis Mansell	
Thomas Ellis (OM)	1731–61	Became Senior Fellow	
Daniel Silvan Evans	1897–1900	Welsh lexicographer, professor of Welsh at University College of Wales, Aberystwyth and chancellor of Bangor Cathedral	
Daniel Evans	1817–46	Welsh poet (known as Daniel Ddu o Geredigion)	
Ellis Evans (OM/HF)	1978–96	Jesus Professor of Celtic (1978–96)	
Roy Evans	1998–99	Civil engineer who was a Welsh Supernumerary Fellow in his capacity as Vice-Chancellor of the University of Wales, Bangor	
Niall Ferguson	1992–present	Laurence Tisch Professor of History at Harvard University since 2004, senior research fellow since 2002 (having previously been an Official Fellow in History)	
Edmund Ffoulkes (OM)	1843–55	Anglican priest (and nephew of Principal Henry Foulkes) who converted to Roman Catholicism and back to Anglicanism, becoming vicar of the University Church of St Mary the Virgin	
Sir Idris Foster (HF)	1947–78	Jesus Professor of Celtic (1947–78)	
John Fraser	1921–45	Jesus Professor of Celtic (1921–45)	
Herbert George (OM)	1919–39	Chemistry tutor, who also acted as the college's Librarian and Bursar	
Lewis Gilbertson (OM)	1840–72	Served as Junior Bursar for a time, then as vice-principal (1855–72); tried to move the college towards Anglo-Catholicism and involved in the renovation of the chapel in 1864	
Charles Godfray	2006–present	Hope Professor of Entomology since 2006	
Albert Goodwin (OM)	1933–53	History Lecturer (1931) then Fellow; later professor of history at the University of Manchester	
David Grant	2005–06	Engineer who was a Welsh Supernumerary Fellow in his capacity as Vice-Chancellor of Cardiff University	
John Gray	1976–97	Political philosopher, who became School Professor of European Thought at the London School of Economics	
Ernest Howard Griffiths	1905, 1909, 1913, 1917	Physicist and principal of the University College of South Wales and Monmouthshire, and a Welsh Supernumerary Fellow	
John Griffiths (OM)	1863–16	Mathematician with a particular interest in analytical geometry	
Sir John Rigby Hale (OM/HF)	1949–64	Historian of the Renaissance	
David Hargreaves	1979–84	University Reader in Education; later became professor of education at the University of Cambridge (1988–2000)	
Paul Harvey	1997–present	Professor of Zoology	
Felicity Heal	1980-2011	Historian of early modern Britain; Fellow in History and first woman Fellow of Jesus College; now Emeritus Fellow; editor of the 2021 Jesus College history	
Anthony Heath	1970–86	Professor of Sociology at Oxford (1999–2010)	
Raymond Hide (HF)	1983–96	Geophysicist, working in meteorology, oceanography and geomagnetism	
John Higginson	1571 – after 1622	A Leicestershire priest who was one of the eight original Fellows of the college, and was still alive in 1622 when the college's third charter was granted by King James I	
Sir John Houghton (OM/HF)	1960–83	Professor of Atmospheric Physics (1976–83) and chair of the United Nations Intergovernmental Panel on Climate Change	
James Howell	1623	Elected to a Fellowship, but never formally admitted before his place was taken by another in 1626	
Thomas Huet	1571–91	Precentor of St David's Cathedral (1562–88), one of the eight original Fellows of the college	
Humphrey Humphreys (OM)	1673–80	Bishop of Bangor (1689–1701), Bishop of Hereford (1701–12)	
Thomas Huyck	1571–75	Chancellor of the Diocese of London, one of the eight original Fellows of the college	
Edward James (OM)	1589 or 1590 – about 1596	Welsh cleric who translated the first Book of Homilies into Welsh in 1606	
Francis Jayne	1868–73	Lecturer in modern history (1871–79), later Bishop of Chester	
John David Jenkins (OM)	1852–76	Leoline Fellow and Canon of Pietermaritzburg, later called the "Rail men's Apostle" for his ministry to railway workers in Oxford	
Robert Johnson	1571–1625	One of the eight original Fellows of the college, later Archdeacon of Leicester and founder of Oakham and Uppingham Schools	
Hugh Jones (OM)	1839–44	Welsh cleric, later Archdeacon of St Asaph	
John Viriamu Jones	1897–98	Scientist who was first principal of the University of Wales, Cardiff, first Vice-Chancellor of the University of Wales and the college's first Welsh Supernumerary Fellow	
John Jones (OM)	1667–68	Welsh cleric, physician, inventor and chancellor of Llandaff Cathedral	
Maurice Jones (OM/HF)	1923–?	Welsh Supernumerary Fellow (the length of his tenure of the Fellowship is unclear), principal of St David's College, Lampeter (1923–38)	
Merfyn Jones	2004–05	Historian who was a Welsh Supernumerary Fellow in his capacity as Vice-Chancellor of the University of Wales, Bangor	
Samuel Jones (OM)	1653–56	Non-conformist clergyman who established an academy in Wales for dissenting ministers	
Joseph Keble	1648–?	Lawyer and writer; said to have been appointed by the Parliamentary commissioners during the English Civil War, but not included in Hardy's list of Fellows	
Paulina Kewes (OM)	2003–	Helen Morag Fellow and Tutor in English Literature	
Sir Malcolm Knox	1931–36	Philosopher who became professor of Moral Philosophy at St Andrews University (later becoming its principal)	
David Lewis	1839–46	Vice-Principal (1845–46) who resigned his Fellowship on conversion to Catholicism under influence of the Oxford Movement	
Wallace Lindsay (HF)	1880–99	Classicist who became professor of humanity at St Andrews University	
Hugh Lloyd	1614–?	Bishop of Llandaff (1660–67) who was reputedly a Fellow of the college, although the college's records do not substantiate this	
John Lloyd (OM)	1765–73	Welsh cleric	
John Lloyd	1571–1607	Former Dean of St Asaph, judge of the High Court of Admiralty, and one of the eight original Fellows of the college	
William Lloyd (OM)	1641–48; 1660–85	Bishop of St Asaph (1680–92), Bishop of Lichfield and Coventry (1692–99) and Bishop of Worcester (1699–1717), whose fellowship was interrupted by English Civil War	
Robert Lougher	1571–85	Principal of New Inn Hall, Oxford (1564–70 and 1575–80), Regius Professor of Civil Law and one of the eight original Fellows of the college	
Richard Lucas (OM)	1671–84	Later prebend of Westminster Abbey and President of Sion College	
Henry Maurice (OM)	1670–85	Chaplain to Leoline Jenkins on diplomatic missions abroad; elected Lady Margaret Professor of Divinity at Oxford shortly before his death in 1691	
Edmund Meyrick (OM)	1662–63	Benefactor of Jesus College who married shortly after his appointment as a probationary Fellow, making him ineligible for a full Fellowship	
Maurice Meyricke	1622–?	Named as one of the founding Fellows in the college's third charter (1622); college records do not give the end-date of his Fellowship	
Kenneth Morgan (OM)	1991–92	Welsh historian, who was a Welsh Supernumerary Fellow in his capacity as Vice-Chancellor of the University of Wales	
Sir John Morris-Jones (OM)	1904–?	Professor of Welsh at the University College of North Wales from 1895, who held a research fellowship (for an unclear length of time) at Jesus College as well	
Robert Owen (OM)	1845–64	Theologian and antiquarian, who was forced to resign his Fellowship after an allegation of immorality	
Christopher Page	1977–80	Junior Research Fellow, now a Fellow of Sidney Sussex College, Cambridge specialising in medieval music	
Tim Palmer	2010–present	Physicist, who has held the post at Oxford of Royal Society 2010 Anniversary Research Professor of Atmospheric Oceanic and Planetary Physics since 2010	
John Parry	1711–?	Bishop of Ossory (1672–77); college records do not give the end-date of his Fellowship	
William Parry (OM)	1714–27	Clergyman and antiquarian	
Robert Pearce	2007–08	Lawyer who was a Welsh Supernumerary Fellow in his capacity as Vice-Chancellor of the University of Wales, Lampeter	
Sir Edward Bagnall Poulton (OM)	1898–1943	Hope Professor of Zoology (1893–1933); succeeded by G. D. Hale Carpenter	
Theodore Price (OM)	1621–?	Principal of Hart Hall, Oxford and Prebend of Westminster Abbey, who was appointed to a Fellowship when he was made one of the commissioners for settling the college statutes in 1621 (although college records do not give the end-date of his Fellowship)	
Thomas Prichard (OM)	1615–?	Appointed as a Fellow in 1615, then named as one of the founding Fellows in the college's third charter (1622); college records do not give the end-date of his Fellowship	
William Prichard (OM)	1615–?	Named as one of the founding Fellows in the college's third charter (1622); college records do not give the end-date of his Fellowship	
Brinley Rees	1975–76	Welsh Supernumerary Fellow in his capacity as principal of St David's College, Lampeter (1975–80)	
Rice Rees (OM)	1828–39	Welsh cleric and historian; Hardy gives his election year as 1830	
David George Ritchie	1878–94	Scottish philosopher, who was later professor of Logic and Metaphysics at the University of St Andrews	
Keith Robbins	1996–97; 2002–03	Historian who was a Welsh Supernumerary Fellow in his capacity as Vice-Chancellor of the University of Wales, Lampeter	
Percy Seymour (OM)	1924–43	Australian classicist, Bursar (1930–35)	
Robert Steel (OM/HF)	1954–56; 1974–75; 1979–80	Geographer who left his fellowship to become professor of geography at Liverpool University; a Welsh Supernumerary Fellow on two occasions in his capacity as principal of the University College of Swansea (1974–82)	
George Stradling	1641–42	Dean of Chichester Cathedral (1672–88)	
Henry Stuart Jones	1928–29, 1932–33	Former Camden Professor of Ancient History at Oxford, who was later a Welsh Supernumerary Fellow in his capacity as principal of the University College of Wales, Aberystwyth	
Fredric William Taylor (OM)	1980—	Halley Professor of Physics at Oxford University); Head of Atmospheric, Oceanic and Planetary Physics (1980-2001)	
Thomas Llewellyn Thomas (OM)	1872–97	Welsh-language scholar who served as senior tutor and vice-principal (acting as principal 1887–95 during Daniel Harper's illness), but lost the 1895 election to become principal	
William Thomas (OM)	1635–?	Later Bishop of St David's and Bishop of Worcester; college records do not show when his Fellowship terminated	
Sir James Thursfield (HF)	1864–81	Naval historian and journalist, who became first editor of the Times Literary Supplement	
Sir Peter Tizard (HF)	1972–83	First Professor of Paediatrics at Oxford University	
Graham Tomlin	1989–94	Chaplain, later vice-principal of Wycliffe Hall, Oxford	
James Vincent (OM)	1816–24	Later Dean of Bangor	
Colin Webb	1973–2005	Professor of Physics at Oxford (1992–2002)	
James Williams (OM)	1813–22	Later Chancellor of Bangor Cathedral	
John Williams (OM)	1783–?	Welsh cleric, and Master of the free school at Llanrwst; college records do not give the end-date of his fellowship	
Leonard Woodward	1939–70	Chemist who was an authority on Raman spectroscopy	
Edward Wynne (OM)	1703–11	Chancellor of the Diocese of Hereford (1707–54) and an Anglesey landowner	
Robert Wynne (OM)	1681–91	Chancellor of St Asaph (1690–1743); the elder brother of William	
William Wynne (OM)	1692–1704	Welsh cleric and historian; the younger brother of Robert	
