= Derek Long =

British chemist (1925–2020)

Derek A. Long (11 August 1925 – 16 July 2020) was a professor of structural chemistry at the University of Bradford, working in the field of Raman spectroscopy.

== Life ==
Long was born on 11 August 1925 in Gloucester, England and was educated at Sir Thomas Rich's School and Jesus College, Oxford, where he studied chemistry with Leonard Woodward and obtained a first-class honours degree followed by a doctorate. His area of research was Raman spectroscopy. He then worked at the University of Minnesota, Minneapolis for a year before returning to Oxford in 1950 as a research fellow, and then in 1956 moved to the University College of Wales, Swansea as a lecturer. In 1966, having risen to the rank of Reader at Swansea, he was appointed Professor of Structural Chemistry at the University of Bradford, the first person to hold the title. He was the first director of the university's Molecular Spectroscopy Unit from 1982 onwards, until his retirement (with the title of Emeritus Professor) in 1992. He has been awarded an honorary doctorate by the University of Reims and made a Foreign Member of the Accademia Nazionale dei Lincei, Rome. He died on 16 July 2020.

== Works ==
Long's first published paper was co-written with Chapman in 1949 for the Transactions of the Faraday Society on "Relative intensities in the Raman spectra of some Group IV tetrahalides". In total, he published in the region of 200 scientific papers on Raman spectroscopy, including articles on its history and development. He was the first in Britain to construct a recording Raman spectrometer (1948) and a hyper Raman spectrometer (1970). He was the joint founding editor of the Journal of Raman Spectroscopy (1973 onwards), later becoming editor-in-chief. His book, Raman Spectroscopy (1977), has achieved a considerable reputation and been translated into various languages. A further book, The Raman Effect, was published in 2002.
