= Jesus College Boat Club =

The name Jesus College Boat Club may refer to at least two rowing clubs, including:

- Jesus College Boat Club (Cambridge)
- Jesus College Boat Club (Oxford)
