= Thomas Pardoe =

Thomas Pardoe may refer to:

- Thomas Pardoe (painter) (1770–1823), British enameler
- Thomas Pardoe (boxer) (1912–1992), English boxer
- T. Earl Pardoe (1885–1971), head of the Brigham Young University drama program

== See also ==
- Thomas Pardo (died 1763), principal of Jesus College, Oxford
- Thomas Letson Pardo (1840–1925), Ontario farmer, manufacturer and political figure
