= Edward Edwards (priest, died 1783) =

Welsh scholar and clergyman

Edward Edwards (c. 1726 – 2 September 1783) was a Welsh scholar and clergyman. He was a Fellow of Jesus College, Oxford for over thirty-five years, and was vice-principal for more than twenty years. His particular scholastic interest was in the works of the Greek philosopher Xenophon.

== Life ==
Edwards was the son of Lewis Edwards and was born in Talgarth in the parish of Tywyn, Merionethshire, in North Wales. He was educated at Jesus College, Oxford, where he matriculated in May 1743 – he was said to be 17 years old at that time. He obtained his Bachelor of Arts degree in January 1747 and was elected to a fellowship of the college in the same year. He retained his fellowship until 1783, and also served as vice-principal of the college from 1762 until 1783 (beginning when Thomas Pardo was principal, continuing in post throughout the principalship of Humphrey Owen and into the time of Joseph Hoare). He was also awarded the higher degrees of Bachelor of Divinity (1756) and Doctor of Divinity (1760).

He was ordained deacon on 23 July 1749 at Cuddesdon by the Bishop of Oxford, Thomas Secker. He was ordained priest by Secker on 10 June 1750 at Christ Church Cathedral, Oxford. He was rector of the parish of Besselsleigh, Oxfordshire from at least 1770. In 1783, Edwards resigned his fellowship, having been appointed by the college as rector of Aston Clinton, Buckinghamshire on 31 July 1782. His time at Aston Clinton was limited, since one source gives his date of death as 2 September 1783, and a letter written by Samuel Johnson confirms that Edwards was dead by 1784.

Edwards and Samuel Johnson were friends and exchanged letters – Johnson described Edwards as "my convivial friend" and stayed with Edwards at Jesus College on a visit to Oxford in 1782. Edwards had an interest in matters connected with Wales, but his primary concern was Greek literature. He prepared an edition of Xenophon's Memorabilia, and published an essay on Socratic ethics in 1773 in the light of Xenophon's writings. His edition was printed with the Greek text and a Latin version before his death; the publication was completed by his friend Henry Owen in 1785.
