= Thomas Ellis (priest, died 1673) =

Welsh clergyman and antiquarian

Thomas Ellis (1625 – April 1673) was a Welsh clergyman and antiquarian.

== Life ==
Ellis was born at Ystumllyn, near Criccieth, Caernarvonshire. He matriculated at Jesus College, Oxford in 1640, graduating with a B.A. degree in 1644, and taking his M.A. degree in 1646. In 1648, when the Parliamentary visitors came to the college, and Ellis was asked whether he meant to submit to the authority of Parliament, he replied that he could not "without the hazard of shipwrackinge of my soule". He later submitted and was appointed Fellow of the college in 1649, although he was a critic of the Parliamentary-appointed Principal, Michael Roberts. Ellis kept his fellowship on the Restoration, becoming vice-principal under Francis Mansell. He hoped to be appointed to succeed Mansell in 1661, but the position went to Leoline Jenkins and Ellis then gave up his teaching duties (although he retained his fellowship until 1667).

Ellis had a particular interest in the study of Welsh history. However, his publication record was not without difficulty. Robert Vaughan of Hengwrt intended to publish a new edition of The Historie of Cambria by David Powel and asked Ellis to complete the work, using Vaughan's notes as well as his own. However, in 1663, after 128 sheets of the book had been printed, Ellis complained that all of Vaughan's material had been published in 1661 by Percie Enderbie and refused to continue. Memoirs of Owen Glendowr, published in 1775, was attributed to Ellis, but Sir John Edward Lloyd later showed that Vaughan had written it, with Ellis simply being the copyist.

In 1665, King Charles II, his court and Parliament moved to Oxford to escape the plague, and Ellis's fortunes improved. He succeeded his kinsman John Ellis as rector of St Mary's, Dolgellau, Merionethshire. He died in April 1673 in Ystumllyn, and was buried there.
