= Francis Howell (philosopher) =

Francis Howell (1625–1679) was Principal of Jesus College, Oxford, from 1657 to 1660.

== Life ==
Howell was born in Gwinear in Cornwall. He was White's Professor of Moral Philosophy between 1654 and 1657. He was a Fellow of Exeter College, Oxford and was appointed to the position of Principal of Jesus College by Oliver Cromwell, in preference to Seth Ward, who was the choice of the fellows of the college. The college has had strong links to Wales since its foundation. In contrast, Howell was originally from Cornwall and was the first principal not to be either Welsh or of Welsh descent (and the last until 1921). Howell remained in post until The Restoration, when Francis Mansell became Principal for the third and final time.
