= Jesus College Boat Club (Oxford) =

British rowing club

- The club's blade colours
- Coordinates: 51.743503°N 1.249915°W
- Home water: River Thames (known in Oxford as the Isis)
- Founded: c. 1815 (unofficially), 1835 (formally)
- Key people: Columbus Layton (President); Esther Tan (Captain of Coxes); Ruedi Baumann (Senior Member)
- Head of the River: Never won
- Torpids: Women: 1980–83
- University: University of Oxford
- Colours
- Affiliations: British Rowing (boat code JEO); Jesus College Boat Club (Cambridge) (Sister college)
- Website: jcbc.jesus.ox.ac.uk

Jesus College Boat Club is a rowing club for members of Jesus College, Oxford, one of the constituent colleges of the University of Oxford. The club was formed in 1835, but rowing at the college predates the club's foundation: a boat from the college was involved in the earliest recorded races between college crews at Oxford in 1815, when it competed against Brasenose College. In the early years of rowing at Oxford, Jesus was one of the few colleges that participated in races. Neither the men's nor the women's 1st VIIIs have earned the title of "Head of the River", which is gained by winning Eights Week—the main inter-college rowing competition at Oxford.

A number of college members have rowed for the university against Cambridge University in the Boat Race and the Women's Boat Race. Barney Williams, a Canadian rower who studied at the college, won a silver medal in rowing at the 2004 Summer Olympics, and participated in the Boat Race in 2005 and 2006. Other students who rowed while at the college have achieved success in other fields, including John Sankey, who became Lord Chancellor, Alwyn Williams, who became Bishop of Durham, and Maurice Jones, who became Principal of St David's College, Lampeter. Another college rower, James Page, was appointed Secretary of the Amateur Rowing Association and coached both the Oxford and Cambridge University boat clubs.

The college boathouse, which is shared with the boat club of Keble College, is in Christ Church Meadow, on the Isis (as the River Thames is called in Oxford). It dates from 1964 and replaced a moored barge used by spectators and crew-members. The last college barge had been purchased from one of the Livery Companies of the City of London in 1911. It is now a floating restaurant further down the Thames at Richmond, and for some years was painted in the college colours of green and white.

== History ==
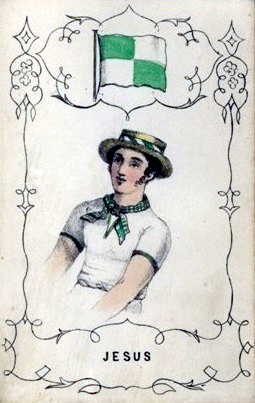
An 1840s depiction of the college's rowing outfit

The early records of the club have been lost, but there are references to a Jesus College boat in material that survives from the early 19th century. There are references to "pleasure boating" at Oxford in letters and poems written in the late 18th century, but races between crews from different colleges did not start until the early 19th century. Rowing in eights (boats with eight oarsmen, each pulling one oar, and steered by a coxswain) began at Eton, where there is a record of the school owning three eights by 1811, and then progressed to Oxford. The first record of an inter-college race, between eights from Jesus College and Brasenose College, dates from 1815. These may have been the only two colleges who had boats racing at that time, and the Brasenose boat was usually victorious. There were few rowers, and races between fours (boats with four oarsmen and a coxswain) tended to attract more interest than races between eights. Students would row to the inn at Sandford-on-Thames, a few miles south of Oxford, and race each other on the way back. The races would start at Iffley Lock and finish at King's Barge, off Christ Church Meadow. Flags hoisted on the barge would indicate the finishing order of the crews. Crews would set off one behind the other, the trailing boat(s) trying to catch, or "bump", the boat ahead. The bumped boat and the bumping boat would then drop out and the bumping boat would start the next day's race ahead of the bumped boat. The aim was to become the lead boat, known as Head of the River. For identification, crews wore college colours and emblazoned the rudder of the boat with the college coat of arms. Crews from Jesus College painted leeks (an emblem of Wales) on their oars for further distinction. In early races, some rowers wore high hats while others, including the Jesus crews, wore Tam o'shanters in college colours (green with a white band for Jesus); crews from Jesus College wore these until at least 1847.

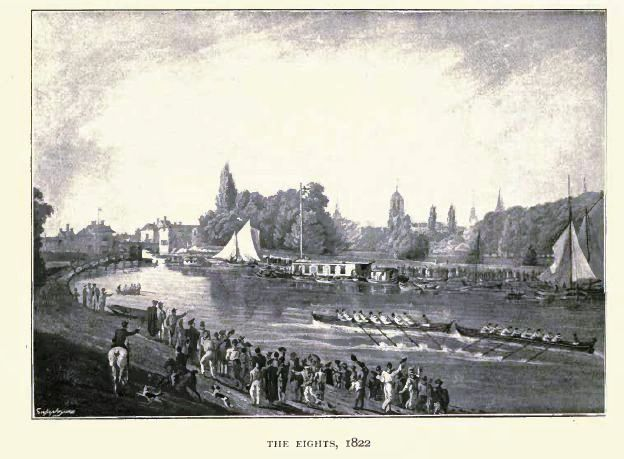
A print of eights racing at Oxford in 1822, thought to depict the Jesus College boat

In 1822, crews from Jesus and Brasenose raced each other to become Head of the River. One Brasenose rower apparently "caught a crab", slowing the boat. The Brasenose boat was bumped by the Jesus boat, but rowed on regardless and claimed that it was still Head of the River. Jesus and Brasenose men competed over which college's flag should be hoisted to denote the winning boat. One of the Brasenose crew ended the dispute by saying "Quot homines tot sententiae, different men have different opinions, some like leeks and some like onions", referring to the emblem on the Jesus oars, and it was agreed to row the race again. The Brasenose crew won the rematch. The incident has been said to be shown in an 1822 picture, the earliest depiction of an eights race at Oxford, painted by I. T. Serres (Marine Painter to George IV). However, the print was published on 1 March 1822 and it would have taken several months to prepare and engrave. It also shows a summer scene. Both of these points suggest that the print depicts either an imaginary scene or an unrecorded event from 1821.

A "bump" during Torpids 1999: Jesus Men's 1st VIII catch Hertford.

Races gradually became more formalised, and regulations were introduced prohibiting colleges from using professional rowers or members of other colleges. A race for the colleges' second boats (Torpids) was introduced in 1826, and eventually boats with less than eight oars were excluded from the races. During the late 1820s and early 1830s, Jesus did not take part in races, but the college was mentioned as having a second boat by 1836. The formal foundation of the club dates from 1835, and official records of inter-college races begin in 1837. The Jesus College 1st VIII started the competition that year in second position, behind the Christ Church 1st VIII, but after being bumped on successive nights by Exeter, Balliol and Queen's colleges, Jesus took no further part in that year's competition. In 1838, the Jesus College boat rowed in last place on one evening, but did not participate in the races again until 1844. The club's fortunes varied in the years thereafter. In 1859, the eight achieved an unusual "overbump" (catching the crew that had started three places ahead of them, after the boat immediately ahead of it had bumped the boat it was chasing) and so went up three positions in one race. However, the college boat did not compete in 1860 and it finished in last place in 1864. From 1864 onwards, said Ernest Hardy (in his 1899 history of the college), "the boating record of the College has not been good" – the college did not take part in the races in many years, and it seldom improved its position by more than one or two places when it did participate. The college resumed regular participation in the races in 1882; although it was in last place in 1889, the college improved its position, and went up by nine places between 1894 and 1896. Hardy also commented that the 1896 Jesus College boat had a reputation of being one of the faster boats in the university. The crew entered for the Ladies' Challenge Plate at the Henley Regatta, but lost to Eton, the eventual winners.

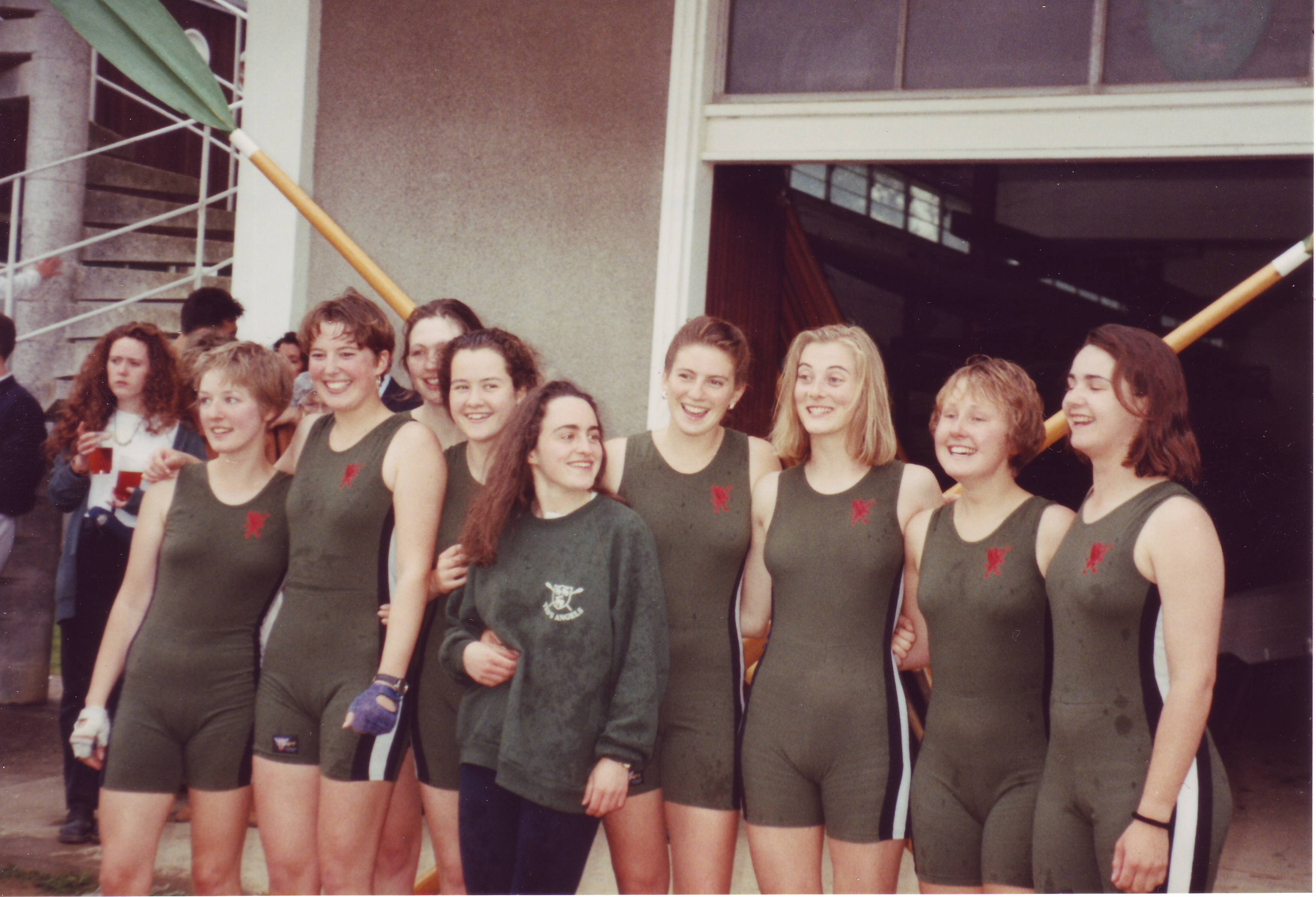
The women's 1st VIII, 1993

By 1930, the college 1st VIII had reached its highest position on the river for thirty years. In 1947, the college chaplain Leslie Cross presented a new set of oars to the club. He retired that year, and the college magazine, noting that Cross had been a particularly generous supporter of the club, stated that the oars had already been used to good purpose. The 1st VIII progressed further in the 1950s, making five bumps in 1951 and four in 1952 to reach the first division, with a high point of seventh in 1957. It later returned to the second division, before re-entering the first division in 1970. Its highest position in recent years was seventh in the first division in 2000; it has been back in the second division since 2004, and finished eighth in the second division in 2011.

Women were first admitted to Jesus College in 1974; the college was one of the first five men's colleges to do so. The women's 1st VIII was Head of the River in Torpids between 1980 and 1983. In 1993, the women's 1st VIII won their "blades" in the first divisions of both Torpids and Eights Week, an achievement that led to the crew being described in the Jesus College Record as vying "not just for the College team of the decade, but perhaps for the team of the last three decades", in any sport. The same crew also won the Novices' Trophy at the Wallingford Regatta in the same year. The women's 1st VIII has not maintained its position since then. After some years in the third division, it ended the 2011 Eights Week in twelfth place in the second division, winning blades in the process.

== Club structure and finance ==
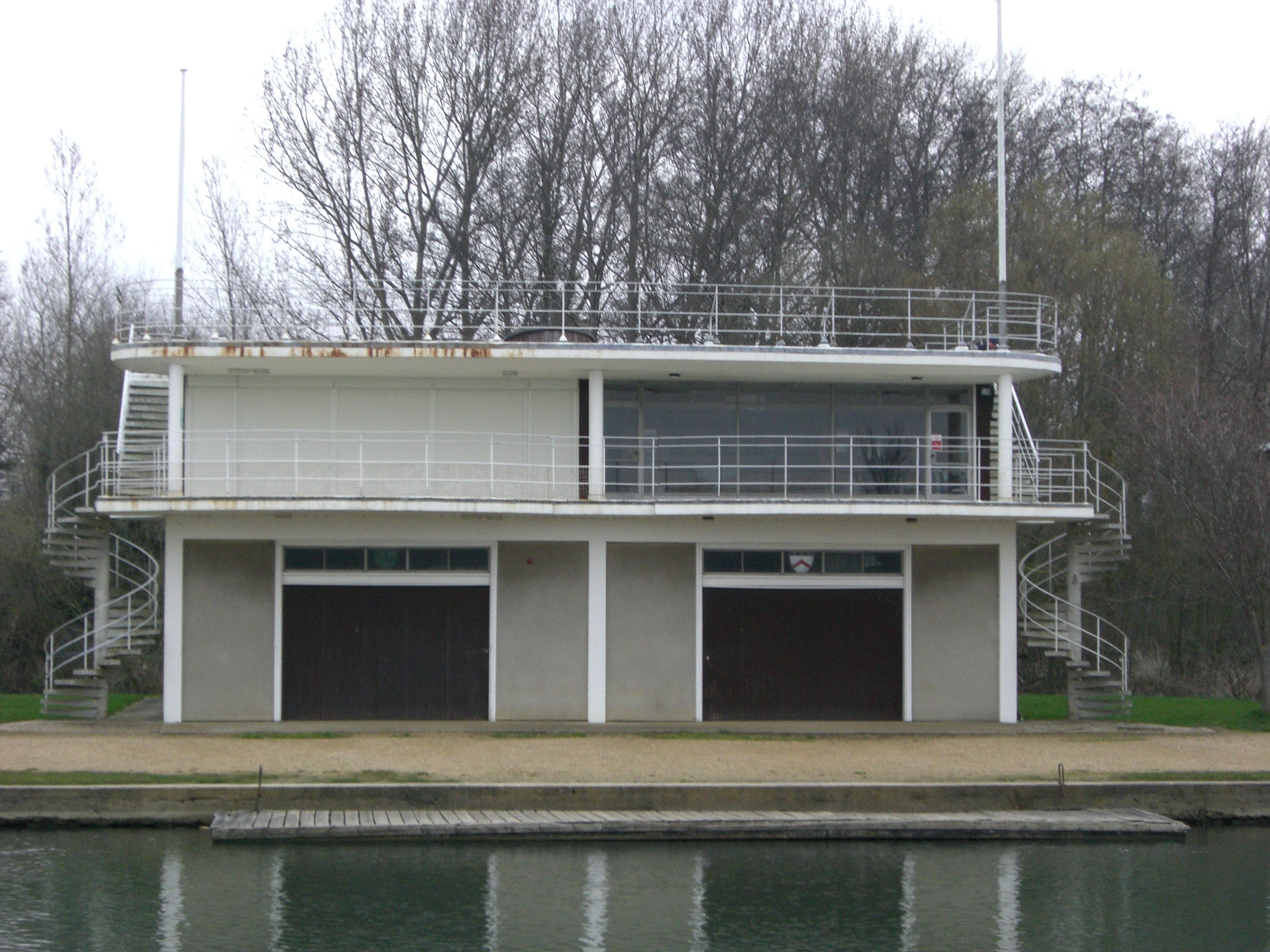
On the left is the club's boathouse on the Isis. The right-hand half of the building is used by Keble College.

All members of the college who have coxed or rowed in a JCBC boat are Ordinary Members of the Boat Club, a status that they retain until one month after leaving the college. The club is run by a committee, consisting of a President, the Men's and Women's Captains of Boats, Men's and Women's Vice-Captains of Boats, Captain of Coxes, Treasurer, Secretary, Boathouse Safety Officer, Kit Officer, a Middle Common Room representative, two Social Secretaries, and as of Michaelmas Term 2024 an inaugural Junior Common Room representative was created. Members of the committee hold office for one year, starting on Sunday of the sixth week of Trinity Term – the day after the last day of Eights Week. The Senior Member of the club is Peter Mirfield, a Fellow and Tutor in Law at the college.

The college uses a proportion of student fees to fund social and sporting activity. The allocation for sport, including rowing, is overseen by the Committee of Amalgamated Clubs, which has representatives from the Junior and Middle Common Rooms (for undergraduates and postgraduates) as well as from the college's sport clubs.

Old Members of the college who rowed when they were students can join the Cadwallader Club. The club, which was revitalised in 1974 and organises an annual dinner for members, also receives contributions for the Cadwallader Trust; this has been a registered charity since December 1982 and supports rowing at the college both with capital expenditure and training costs. In the year ending 5 April 2022, the trust's expenditure was £1,300. Members of the Cadwallader Club have helped to provide new boats and blades for the men's and the women's 1st VIIIs, and on the Saturday of Eights Week 2008, the trust presented the boat club with a new coxed four, named Cadwallader. Cadwallader Club members are also non-voting members of the boat club.

== Rowers ==
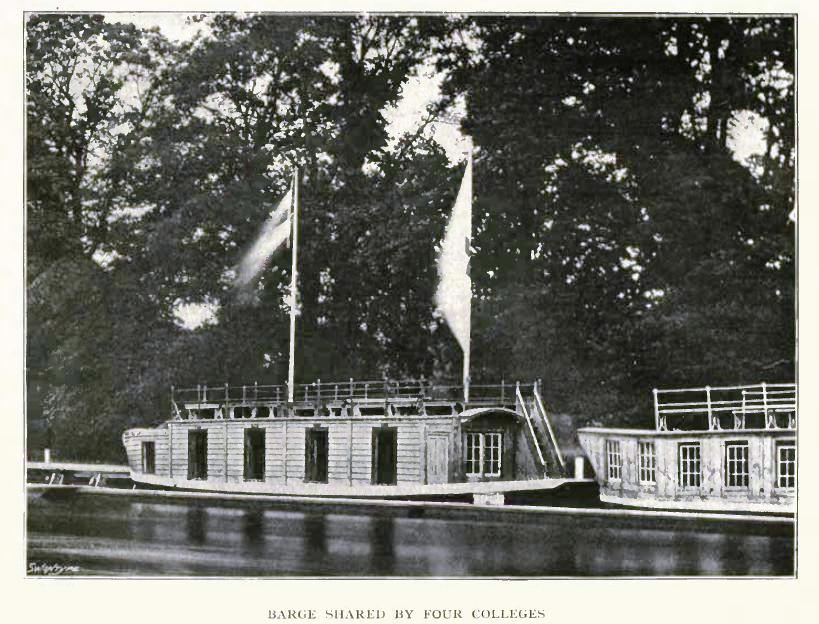
Jesus College shared this barge with three other colleges during the 19th century.

D. W. Griffith, the stroke of the Jesus College boat, was present at the inaugural meeting of the Oxford University Boat Club on 23 April 1839. However, Jesus College oarsmen played an infrequent part in university rowing in the 19th century. No Jesus College student served on the OUBC committee between 1839 and 1899, the last year for which Sherwood gives records. Two students from the college (W. S. Thompson and E. W. Davies (cox)) were part of the losing Oxford crew in the second Oxford–Cambridge boat race in 1836. Between 1858 and 1899, seven others trialled, unsuccessfully, for places in the Oxford University crew. Since then, college representation in the Boat Race has been more frequent: M. L. Thomas and D. R. Glynne Jones (1952) and M.L. Thomas (President, 1953); Boris Mavra (1992, 1993 and 1995); the Canadian 2004 Olympic rowing silver medallist Barney Williams (2005 and 2006); and Brodie Buckland (2007). Justin Hutchinson rowed for Oxford's reserve crew, known as Isis, in the 2002 and 2003 Boat Races, as did Tim Farquharson and Tom Commins, both undergraduates studying Engineering Science in 2009 and 2015 respectively. Various women have won their "Blue" for competing in the Women's Boat Race against Cambridge: Anna Bean and Ann Bevitt (1989); Louise Sanford (1997); Claire Weaver (1998); and Sarah Marshall (2023).

Some prominent individuals rowed while they were students at the college. The historian Albert Pollard was Captain of Boats in 1890, having rowed in the boat that was last on the river in 1889. Alwyn Williams (later Bishop of Durham), who was a student from 1906 to 1911, was captain of the Boat Club, as was James Page ("Freddie"), who went on to become secretary of the Amateur Rowing Association from 1952 to 1972 and a rowing coach for both Oxford and Cambridge Boat Clubs. Maurice Jones (later Principal of St David's College, Lampeter) was a cox, as were Gordon Roe (later Bishop of Huntingdon) and the chemist Frank Greenaway. John Sankey (later Lord Chancellor) rowed in a Torpid boat that went down four places, whilst the boat in which the baritone David Ffrangcon Davies rowed went up five places in Torpids and four in Eights Week. Angus Buchanan, who won the Victoria Cross in 1916 during the First World War, rowed in a college four in 1919, despite having been blinded in 1917. Anton Muttukumaru (later Commander of the Ceylon Army) rowed at bow in a college four.

== College barges ==
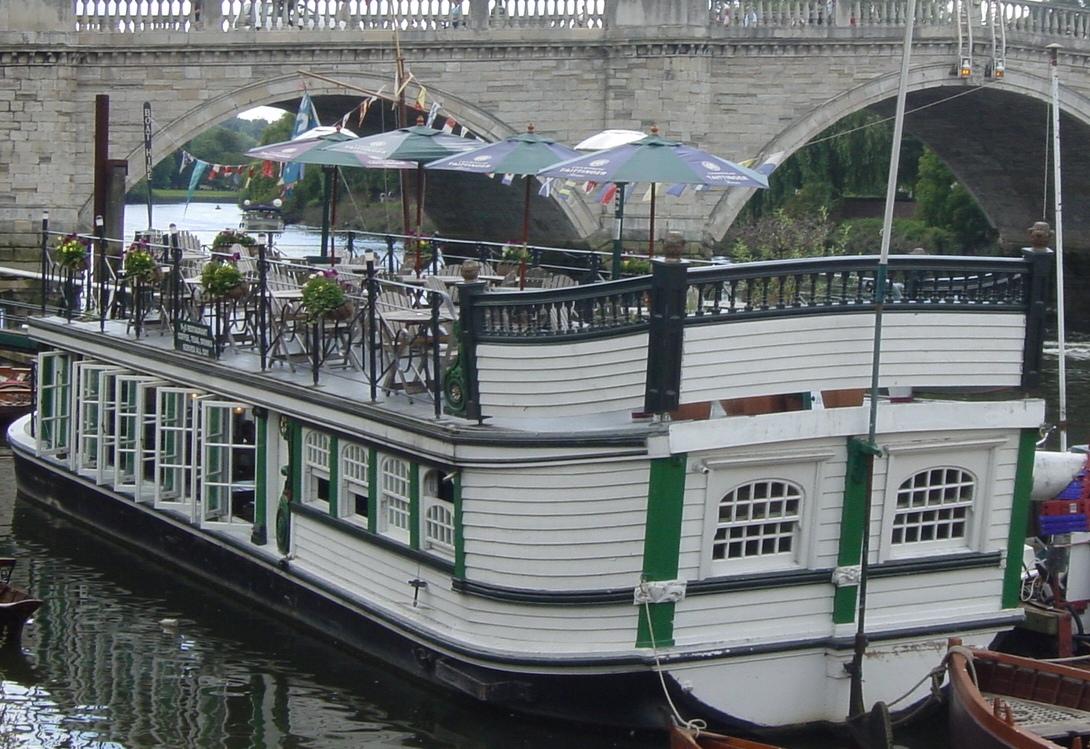
The last college barge (pictured in 2004) is now a floating restaurant at Richmond-upon-Thames.

Colleges began to keep barges moored on the side of the river on Christ Church Meadow from 1839; these would be used for crews to change, for spectators to watch the races and for social functions. Jesus shared a barge with New, St John's and Pembroke after 1857. In 1911, Jesus purchased their own barge from Salters, at a cost of £940.14s.8d (approximately £95,700 as of 2025). It had previously been owned by one of the Livery Companies of the City of London and had been used in the days when the Lord Mayor's Show took place on the River Thames in London rather than through the streets. After sinking in 1955, it was salvaged and restored. In 1964, the college replaced the barge with a boathouse, which is shared with the boat club of Keble College). The barge was moved to Maidenhead where it was later restored. It returned to Oxford in 1987, but was badly damaged by fire in January 1988. After further restoration, it was moved to Richmond-upon-Thames, where it is moored alongside Richmond Bridge and used as a restaurant. The barge was decorated for some years in the college colours of green and white, with a Welsh red dragon on the prow; by 2009, however, it had been repainted with blue instead of green.

== Honours ==
=== Boat Race representatives ===
The following rowers were part of the rowing club at the time of their participation in The Boat Race.

Men's boat race

Year	Name
1836	William S. Thompson
1836	D. T. Davis (cox)
1952	M. L. Thomas
1952	D. R. Glynne-Jones (cox)
1953	M. L. Thomas
1990	Christopher J. Heathcote
1992	Boris Mavra

Year	Name
1993	Boris Mavra
1995	Boris Mavra
2005	Barney Williams
2006	Barney Williams
2007	William Buckland
2022	David Ambler
2026	Jamie Arnold

Women's boat race

Year	Name
2023	Sarah Marshall
2024	Sarah Marshall
2025	Sarah Marshall

== See also ==
- University rowing (UK)
