= James Page (rower) =

British rower

James Houghton Page OBE TD (14 January 1900 – 16 December 1977) was a British rower who was secretary of the Amateur Rowing Association from 1952 to 1972.

== Life ==
Page was born on 14 January 1900 in Lambeth, London. He went to school at Dulwich College, where he was captain of shooting, before attending Jesus College, Oxford, where he was captain of the boat club. He was a master at St Paul's School from 1926 to 1963, where he was a rowing coach. He maintained links with Oxford, successfully coaching Oriel College from their position in 21st place in 1928 to become Head of the River between 1933 and 1936. He also coached Oxford and Cambridge Boat Clubs at various times. He was captain of Thames Rowing Club in 1934 and in 1947–48. In 1952, he became honorary secretary of the Amateur Rowing Association (secretary from 1963 onwards), retiring in 1972. He was elected as Master of the Broderers' Company in 1960, a steward of the Henley Royal Regatta in 1962, and Master of the Fletchers' Company in 1971.

Page also served in the Armed Forces and the police. He was commissioned in the Royal Field Artillery in 1918 and joined the Territorial Army whilst at Oxford. During the Second World War, Page commanded the 52nd Anti-Tank Regiment from 1939 onwards, before transferring to the Royal Air Force Volunteer Reserve. He served in India as a pilot officer, serving until 1947 when he retired with the rank of wing commander. He was appointed an Officer of the Order of the British Empire on retirement. He also received the Territorial Decoration for his services. He became a special constable with the City of London Police in 1933, rising to the rank of superintendent in 1963. He died on 16 December 1977.
