= Jonathan Edwards (academic) =

Welsh theologian and academic

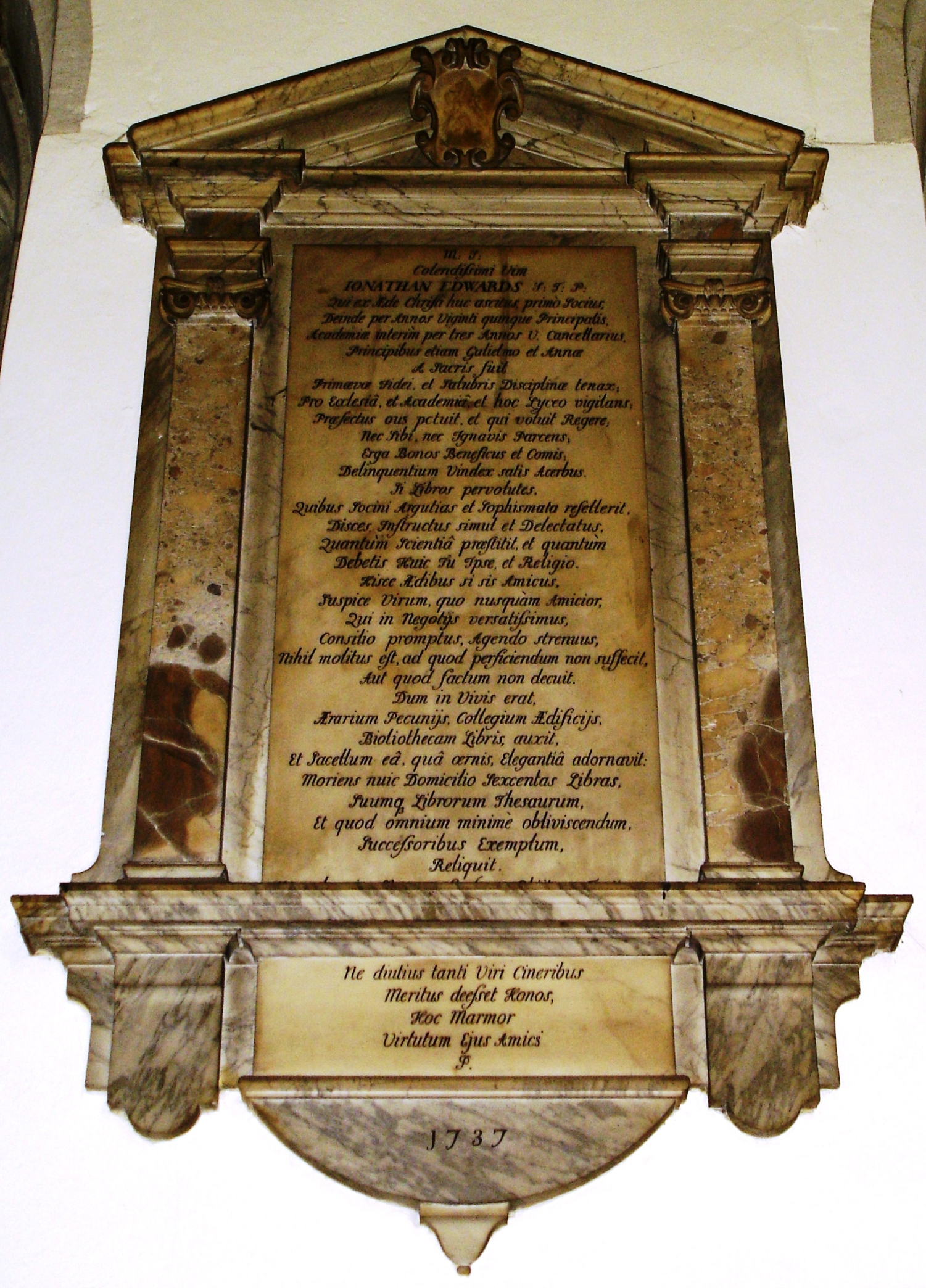
The memorial stone to Edwards in the Jesus College chapel.

Jonathan Edwards (1629 – 20 July 1712) was a theologian and Principal of Jesus College, Oxford, from 1686 to 1712.

Born in Wrexham, Wales, Edwards studied at Christ Church, Oxford, from 1655 to 1659. He became a Fellow of Jesus College in 1662, Vice-Principal in 1668 and Principal on 2 November 1686. He was also Vice-Chancellor of the University of Oxford from 1689 to 1691, the first principal of the college to be so. He was rector of Kiddington, Hinton Ampner and Llandysul and vicar of Clynnog Fawr. He was also appointed Treasurer of Llandaff Cathedral.

He was involved in theological debates with Socinians and Antinomians, publishing A Preservative against Socinianism (in four parts, between 1693 and 1703) and A Vindication of the Doctrine of Original Sin from the exceptions of Dr. Daniel Whitby (1711). He died in 1712, bequeathing his library to Jesus College and money for the restoration of the chapel, in which he was buried.

Academic offices
Preceded by John Lloyd	Principal of Jesus College, Oxford; 1686–1712	Succeeded by John Wynne
Preceded by Gilbert Ironside	Vice-Chancellor of Oxford University; 1689–1692	Succeeded by Henry Aldrich
