= William Jones (college principal) =

Oxford Jesus College principal (1676–1725)

William Jones (26 February 1676 – 29 November 1725), born Kidwelly, Wales, was Principal of Jesus College, Oxford, from 1720 to 1725. He had previously been a student of the college, obtaining his BA in 1697, his MA in 1700, his BD in 1708 and his DD in 1720.
