= Daniel Brevint =

English clergyman (c. 1616-1695)

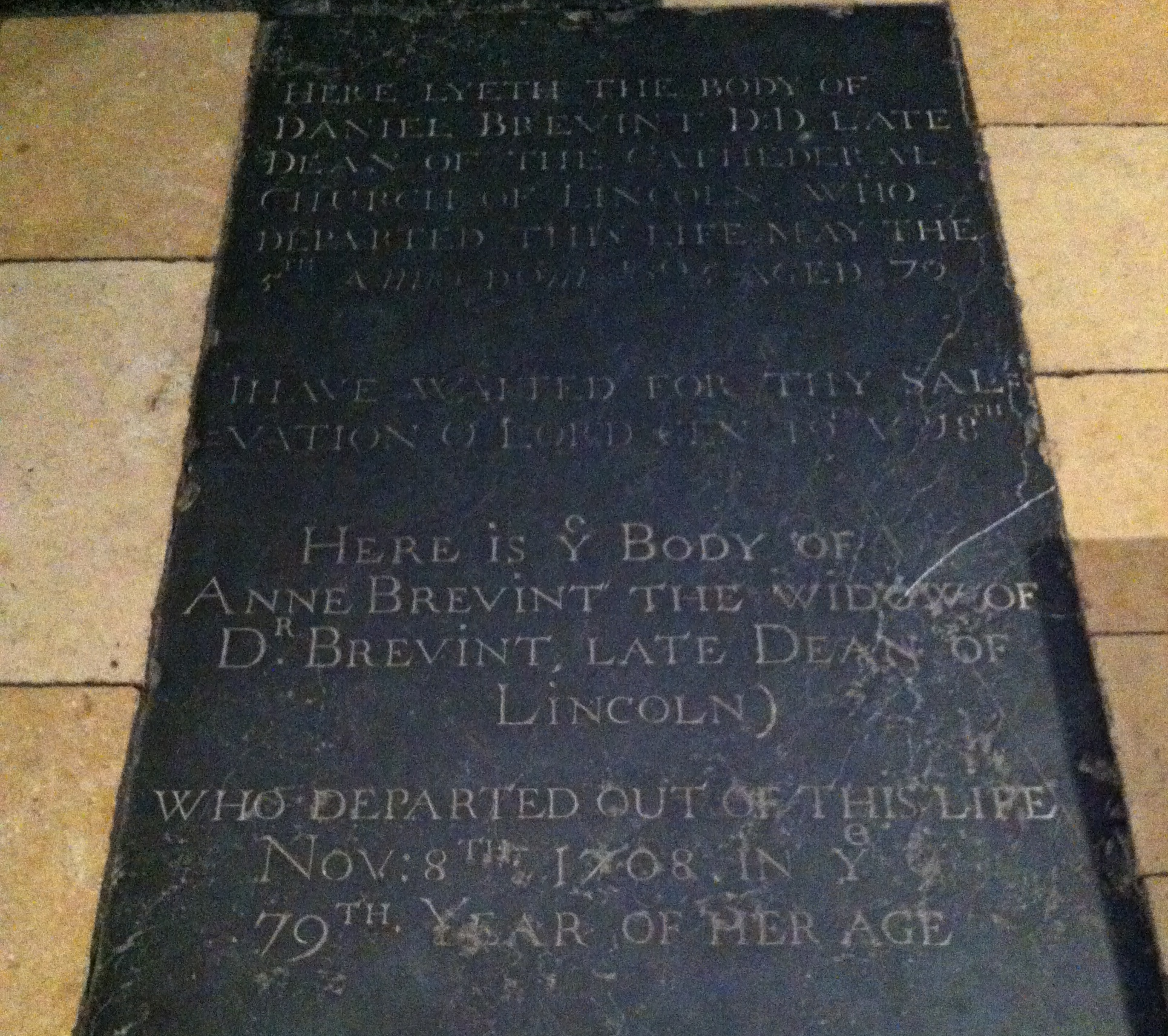
Memorial to Daniel Brevint in Lincoln Cathedral

Daniel Brevint or Brevin (baptised 11 May 1616 – 5 May 1695) was Dean of Lincoln from 1682 to 1695.

== Life ==
Brevint was from the parish of Saint John, Jersey, Channel Islands and was the son and grandson of clergymen. He studied, like his father before him, at the Protestant University of Saumur, and graduated with an MA in 1634. He married Anne de Carteret, daughter of Philippe de Carteret II. When King Charles I created three fellowships for Channel Islanders at Jesus College, Oxford in 1636, Brevint was chosen from Jersey. He held this position until 1648, when his fellowship was removed by Parliamentary commissioners, and he then returned to Jersey, serving as pastor of Grouville. He was ordained deacon and priest in Paris in 1651 by Bishop Thomas Sydserf.

When King Charles II was restored in 1660, he returned to England, becoming prebendary of Durham Cathedral and rector of Brancepath in December 1660. He was appointed Dean of Lincoln on 7 January 1682. He died in the deanery in 1695 and was buried in the cathedral.

== Works ==
Brevint's works included anti-Catholic writings and a famous devotional work on the eucharist: Missale Romanum (1672), The Christian Sacrament and Sacrifice (1673), Saul and Samuel at Endor (1674) Fifty years after Brevint's death, an abridgement of "The Christian Sacrament and Sacrifice" (1673) prepared by John Wesley became Methodism's core "authoritative doctrine on the Sacrament" and remains so today.
