= Frederic de Winton =

Anglican priest

The Venerable Frederic de Winton
- Anglican Archdeacon of Colombo
- Church: Anglican Church of Ceylon
- See: Diocese of Colombo
- In office: 1902–1925

Personal details
- Born: 19 January 1852
- Died: 25 April 1932 (aged 80) Bognor Regis

Frederic Henry de Winton MA (1852–1932) was an Anglican clergyman and the last Missionary Fellow of Jesus College, Oxford. De Winton was Archdeacon of Colombo from 1891 until 1901.

Born on 19 January 1852 into an ecclesiastical family, (Note: his father, Henry de Winton, was Archdeacon of Brecon from 1875 until 1895) he was educated at Uppingham School and Balliol College, Oxford.

He was elected to a Leoline Fellowship at Jesus College, Oxford in 1876. This category of fellow at Jesus College was established by Leoline Jenkins, a former principal of the college, to provide priests to serve in "His Majesty's fleet at sea and foreign plantations", under the direction of the Lord High Admiral and the Bishop of London respectively. De Winton was the last of these fellows, since they were abolished in 1877 by the Oxford and Cambridge Universities Commission without prejudice to the rights of existing holders. He held the position until his death, by which time he had become the most senior fellow at the college.

He was made deacon at Oxford on 24 September 1876.

In 1877 he went to Ceylon as chaplain to the Bishop of Colombo. He held various parochial charges in Ceylon including Diocesan Inspector of Schools followed by incumbencies at St Mark, Badulla then St John, Kalutara until his appointment as Archdeacon in 1902. He held this position until 1925. Alfred Hazel, Principal of the college at the time of de Winton's death, said that he had devoted his life to Colombo, where he was a "well-known and well-loved, if rather eccentric, figure". He retired to England and died in Bognor Regis on 25 April 1932.

== Notes and references ==
- Hardy, Ernest George (1899). Jesus College. F.E. Robinson & Company. ISBN 978-0-415-18632-2.
- "The Clergy List, Clerical Guide and Ecclesiastical Directory" London, John Phillips, 1900
- "Boyd, Ven. Charles", Who Was Who, A & C Black, an imprint of Bloomsbury Publishing plc, 1920–2007 (online ed.), Oxford University Press, 2007
- "Winton, de Ven. Frederic Henry", Who Was Who, A & C Black, an imprint of Bloomsbury Publishing plc, 1920–2007 (online ed.), Oxford University Press, 2007
- Crockford's Clerical Directory, 1908, p. 397
- Hazel, Alfred (3 May 1932). "The Rev. F. H. de Winton". The Times. p. 19.
- The Rev. F. H. De Winton The Times (London, England), Friday, 29 April 1932; p. 19; issue 46120
