= John Ellis (religious writer) =

Welsh clergyman and writer, born 1598

John Ellis (1598/9 – December 1665) was a Welsh Anglican clergyman and religious writer.

== Life ==
Ellis was born at Gwylan, Maentwrog, Merionethshire. He was educated at Hart Hall, Oxford (matriculation 1617, B.A. 1622, M.A. 1625, B.D. (1632); he also received a D.D. from the University of St Andrews in 1634). He was ordained deacon in 1621 and priest in 1622. He was a fellow of Jesus College, Oxford, from 1628 to 1631, when he married.

In 1629, he was made rector of Wheatfield, Oxfordshire, holding the position for about seventeen years. In about 1646, he added the positions of rector of Chinnor, Oxfordshire and rector of Dolgellau, Merionethshire. He had an income of over £200 per year in 1648, from his positions as rector of Dolgellau and of Towyn and from the prebend of Y Faenol, Caernarvonshire. He was described as "the best paid minister in Wales". In 1657, he argued in correspondence that a national college should be established in Wales. He made his will on 4 December 1665 and died within the week. He left money for a schoolmaster to be employed in Dolgellau, which led to the foundation of Dolgellau Grammar School. He was succeeded as rector of Dolgellau by Thomas Ellis, referred to as his kinsman.

== Works ==
In 1641, Ellis published Bellum in idumaeos, a commentary on the Book of Obadiah, dedicating his work to Thomas Tipping of Wheatfield. Clavis fidei (1642), on the Apostles' Creed, was dedicated to John Lisle, and later translated into English. After the Restoration, in September 1660, Ellis published Defensio fidei on the Thirty-nine Articles, which was reprinted several times in London and in Amsterdam.
