= Leslie Cross =

British theologian (1895–1974)

Leslie Basil Cross (18 April 1895 – 12 April 1974) was a theologian and a university chaplain and tutor.

Cross held various positions at Jesus College, Oxford – in addition to teaching students for the whole of the Theology degree at Oxford, he was Estates Bursar (1941–43) and Senior Tutor (1945–47). He invariably answered the telephone by saying "Cross of Jesus". He opposed the college's concentration on science subjects during his tenure, urging in the 1930s that its chemistry laboratory be replaced by student bedrooms. He was also non-resident Vice-Principal of Ripon Hall, Oxford from 1933 to 1954. He was appointed to an emeritus fellowship of Jesus College in 1960, and died on Good Friday 1974 at the age of 78.
