= Leonard Woodward =

British chemist

Leonard Ary Woodward (7 May 1903 – 5 June 1976) was a British chemist who was associated with the University of Oxford for more than 30 years, and who was a leading authority in the field of Raman spectroscopy.

== Biography ==
Woodward was born in Blandford, Dorset, England the son of Henry Martin Woodward, an electrical engineer, and Mary Ellen Woodward, educated at Lincoln College, Oxford, where he was a scholar and was awarded a first-class degree. He then went to the University of Leipzig where he obtained his doctorate. After teaching at the University of Nottingham and the University of Manchester, he worked for the Department of Scientific and Industrial Research in the Fuel Research Station. He was appointed Fellow and Tutor in Chemistry at Jesus College, Oxford in 1939, holding the position until his retirement in 1970. He was then appointed an Emeritus Fellow. He also served the college as Dean and, later, Vice-Principal.

During the Second World War, he worked with D. L. Chapman, another Fellow of Jesus College, in researching the separation of uranium isotopes by gaseous diffusion. At the end of the war, he worked on Raman spectroscopy, a field in which he was regarded as one of the leading authorities, publishing many papers. He was also highly regarded as a chemistry tutor.

He died in Oxford, aged 73.
