= Thomas Pardo =

Oxford Jesus College principal (died 1763)

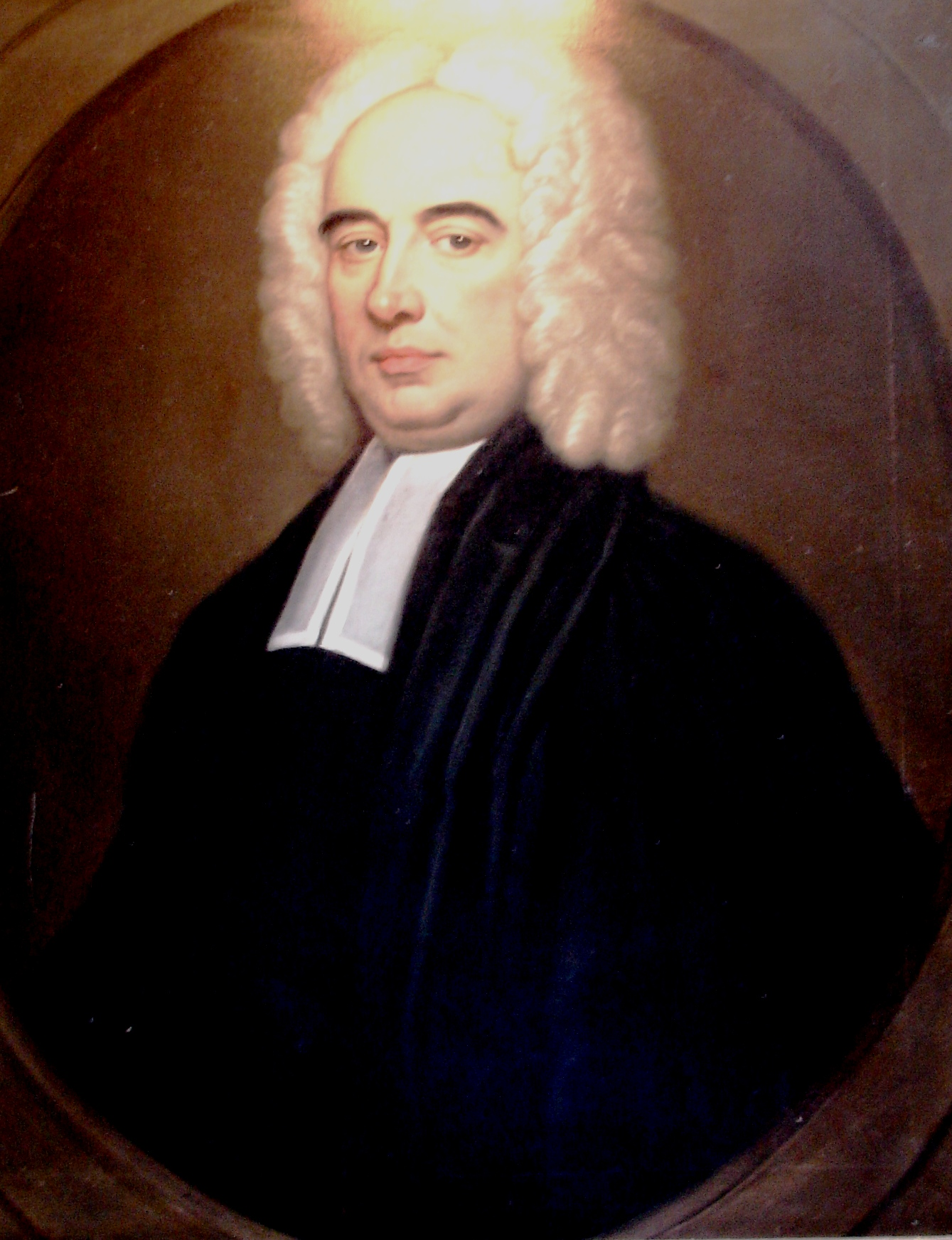
Pardo's portrait in the college hall

Thomas Pardo (died 1763) was Principal of Jesus College, Oxford, from 1727 to 1763.

Pardo, from Kidwelly, Carmarthenshire, Wales, was a scholar at Jesus College from December 1707 and was elected a fellow of the college in 1711. He was the most senior fellow when elected principal in 1727. He held the position of chancellor of St David's from 1749 to 1753. During his time, the north-west corner of the inner quadrangle was completed and alterations to the hall, in particular the ceiling, were carried out, with Pardo himself paying £20 towards the cost. He donated a further £157 10s in 1756 for improvements to the front of the college. He held the position of principal for 36 years, the second-longest tenure in the college's history (after Henry Foulkes). He died in Bath, Somerset in 1763.
