= Joseph Hoare (Welsh academic) =

British priest (1709–1802)

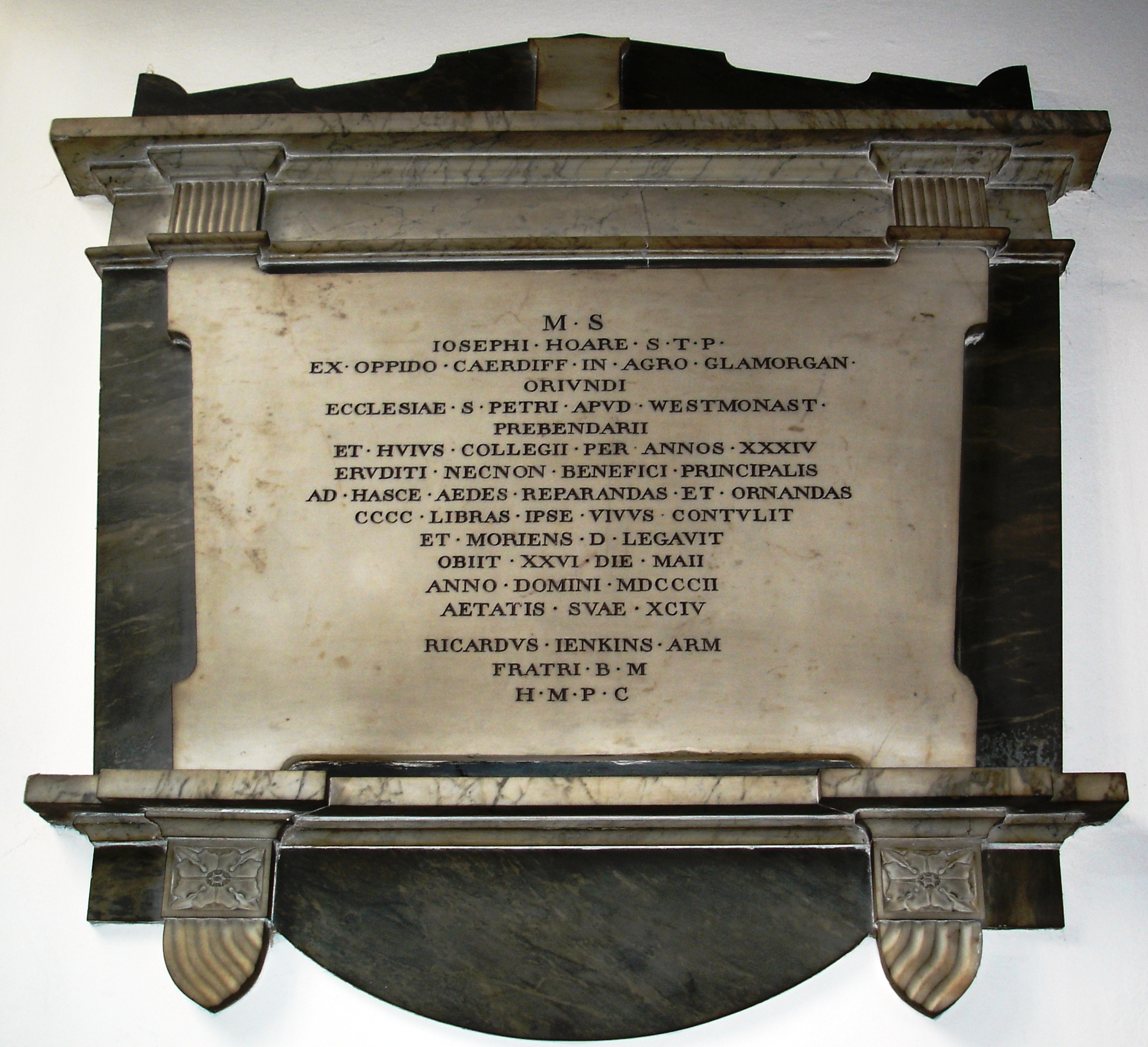
The memorial stone to Hoare in the Jesus College chapel

Joseph Hoare FRS (1709 – 26 May 1802) was a Welsh clergyman and Principal of Jesus College, Oxford, from 1768 to 1802.

The son of Joseph Hoare, from Cardiff, Wales, Hoare studied at Jesus College from 1727 (when he was 18), obtaining his BA in 1730 and his MA in 1733. He was a Prebendary of Westminster Abbey. He was elected a Fellow of the Royal Society in May 1753.. He was appointed Principal of Jesus in 1768. During his time as Principal, he donated £200 towards restoration of the college's Old Quadrangle. In 1798, he also subscribed £100 for the "prosecution of the [French Revolutionary] war" and £21 for muskets and necessaries for the University corps.

Hoare held the post of Principal for forty-four years, the third-longest time in the college's history.

Hoare became deaf in later life, and eventually died in 1802 after inadvertently placing the leg of a chair on the tail of his cat, Tom. The cat attacked Hoare who died shortly after the resulting wounds became infected. The following epitaph was composed on the unusual manner of his death:

Poor Dr Hoare! He is no more!
Bid Cambria’s harp-strings mourn.
The Head of a House died the death of a mouse,
And Tom must be hanged in return
