= Henry Foulkes =

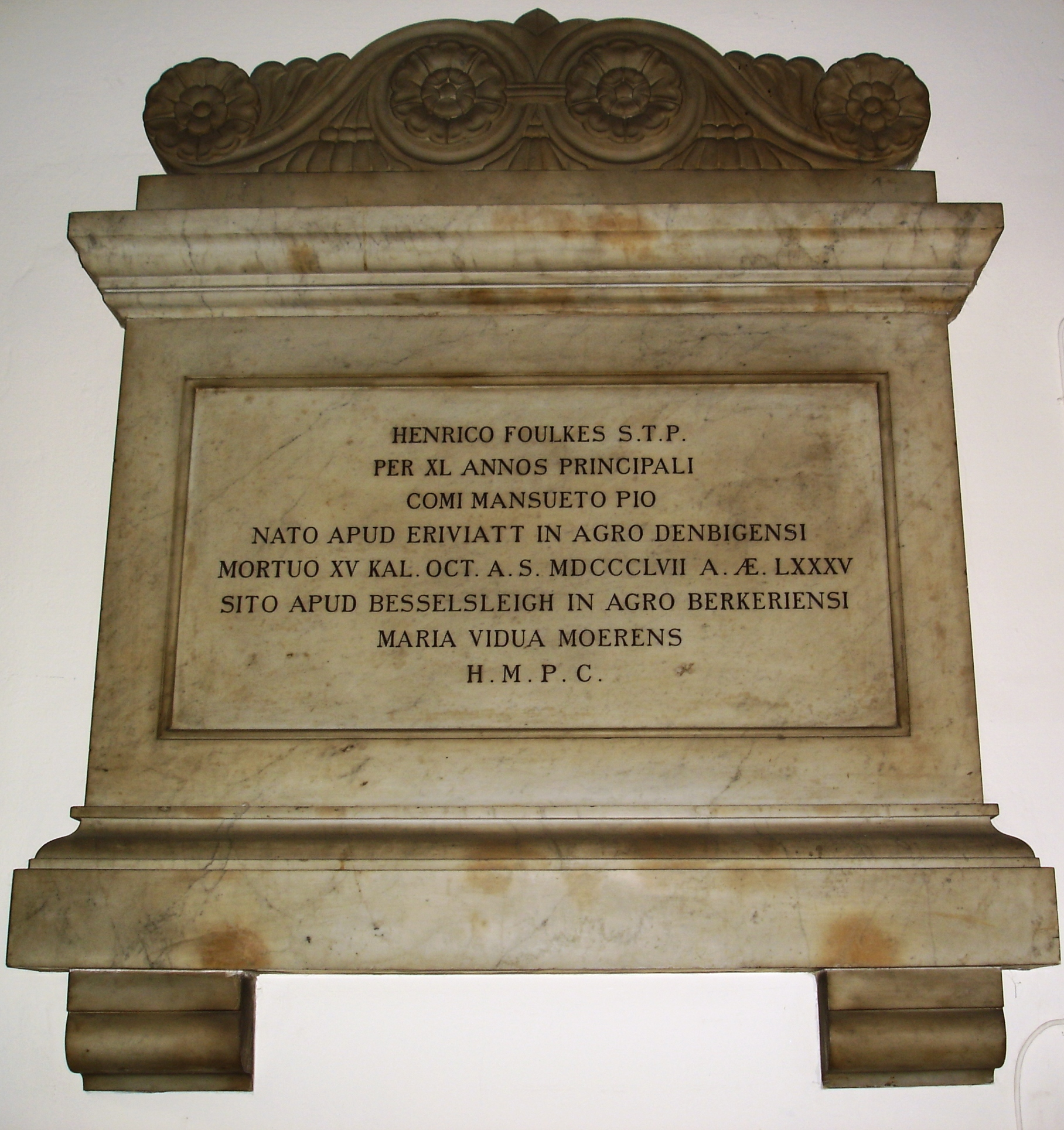
The memorial stone to Foulkes in the Jesus College chapel

Henry Foulkes (b. c.1773 – 17 September 1857) of North Wales was Principal of Jesus College, Oxford, from 1817 to his death. He holds the record for the longest-serving Principal of the college.

He studied at Jesus College, and was awarded his BA in 1794, his MA in 1797, his BD in 1804 and his DD in 1817. At the time of his death, he was reported as being 84 years old, and he had not played a part in university life for some years on account of the "infirmities attendant on old age".
