= Francis Mansell =

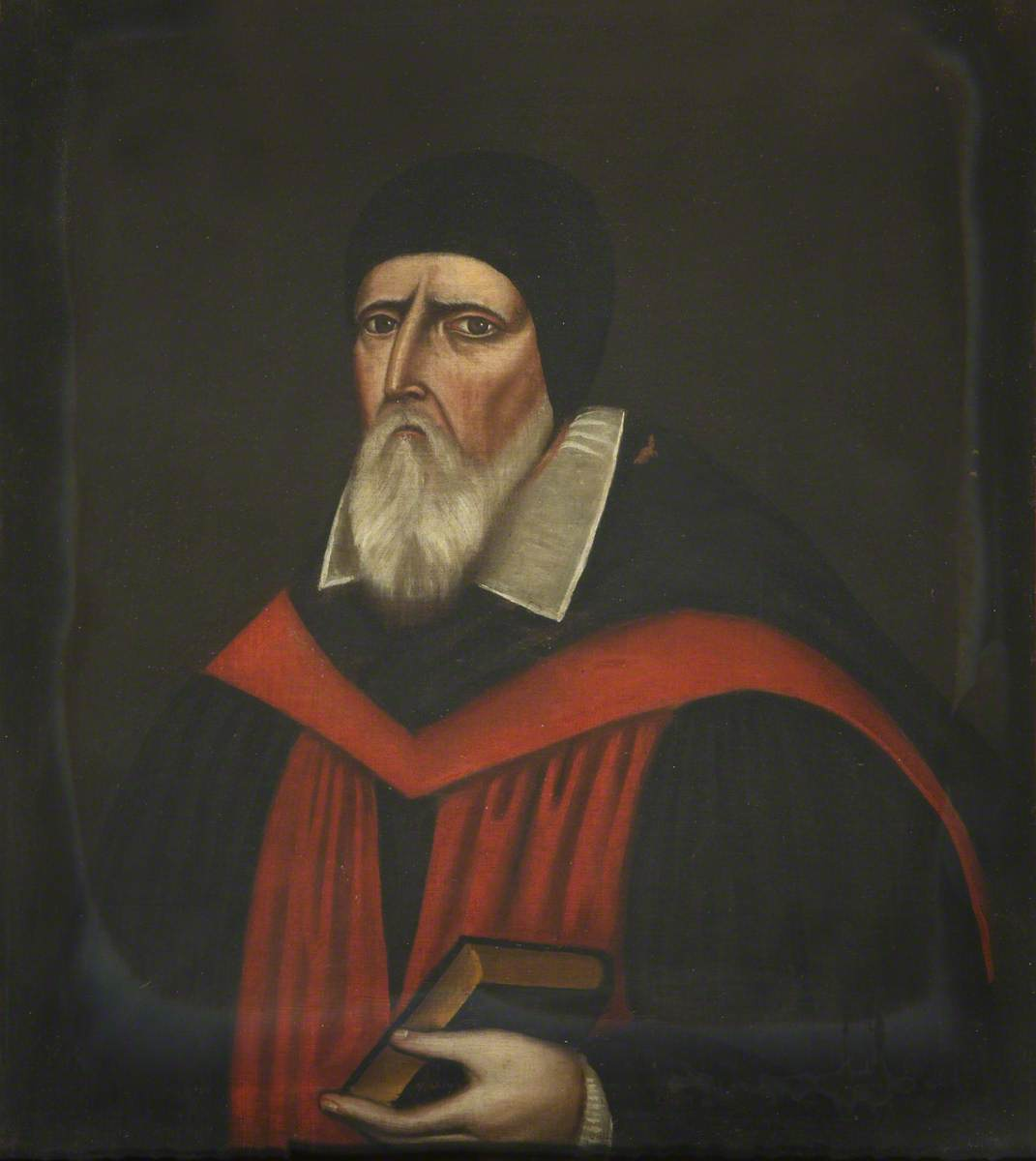
Francis Mansell

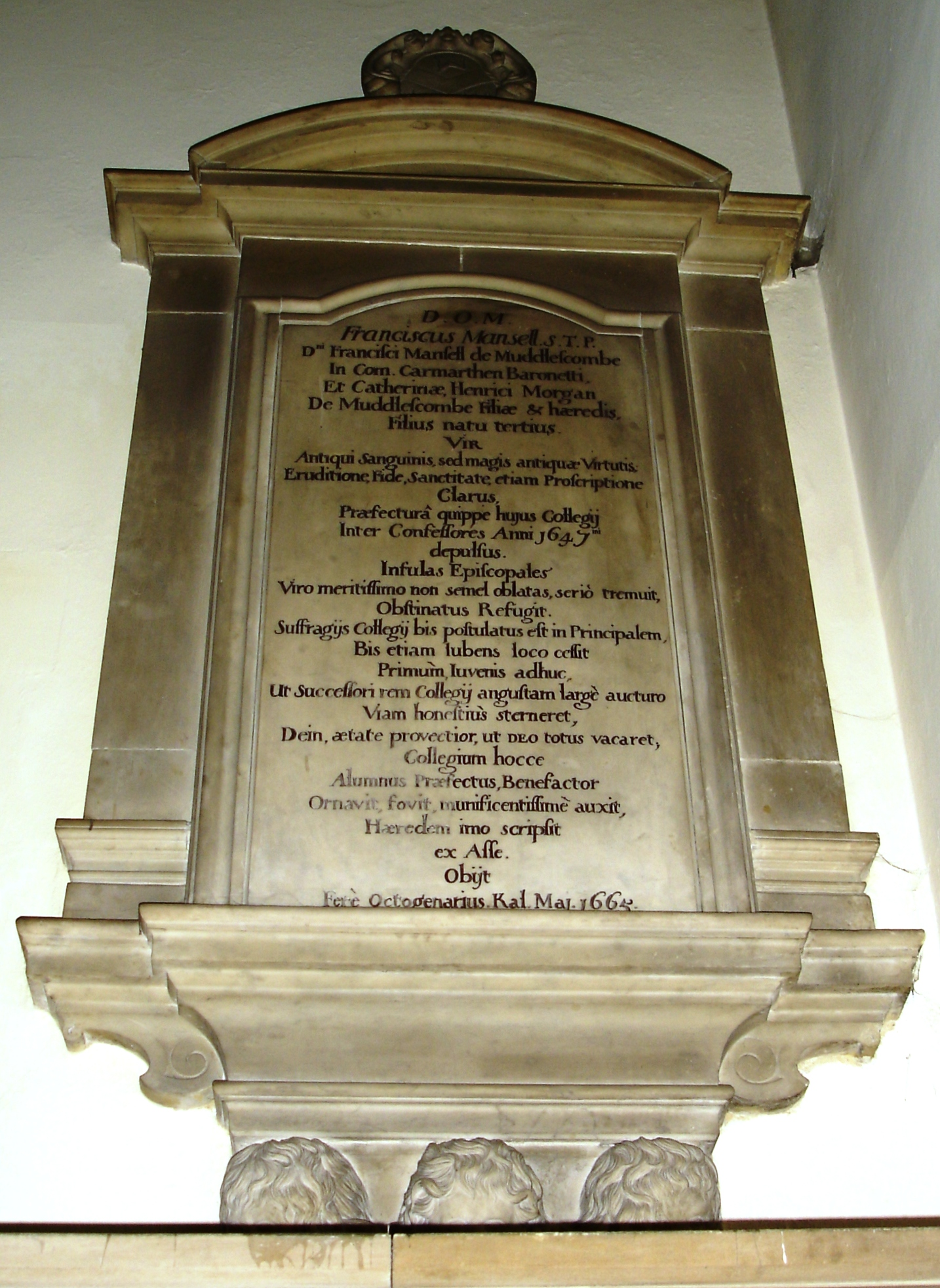
The memorial to Francis Mansell in the college chapel

Francis Mansell (bap. 23 March 1579 – 1 May 1665) was Principal of Jesus College, Oxford, on three occasions: from 1620 to 1621; from 1630 to 1648, when he was ejected by the Parliamentary visitation of the University of Oxford; and from 1660 to 1661. Mansell remained an inhabitant of the college until his death on 1 May 1665. He had previously studied there and left all his property to the college.

== Biography ==
He was born at Muddlescombe, Carmarthenshire, the third son of Sir Francis Mansel (died 1628), first of the Mansel baronets, and his first wife Catherine Morgan. He was educated at the Free School in Hereford and then at Jesus College, graduating Bachelor of Arts in 1611. He became Doctor of Divinity in 1624. His election as Principal of Jesus College in 1620 was in the face of strong opposition, and he apparently thought it prudent to resign a year later and wait for a more favourable opportunity. His re-election in 1630 following the death of his successor Eubele Thelwall seems to have been uncontroversial.

== Civil War and Restoration ==
During the English Civil War he was a staunch Royalist, who attempted to raise Welsh troops for the Royalist cause, leading to his ejection from the university in 1648. He retired to Glamorgan, as did his protege (and successor as Principal of Jesus) Leoline Jenkins. They both took refuge at the house of Sir John Aubrey, first of the Aubrey baronets, at Llantrithyd, as did Gilbert Sheldon, the future Archbishop of Canterbury. Both Mansell and Jenkins remained there until 1651, when Parliament ejected Jenkins for running a "seditious academy" (in fact a private boys school), and both he and Mansell returned to Oxford. Here, due to the respect in which he was universally held, Mansell was given rooms in his old college. He was left in peace, and at the Restoration of Charles II briefly resumed the office of Principal, but due to his failing eyesight, he resigned a year later in favour of Jenkins.

He was possibly the Francis Mansel who, as a wine importer from Chichester, Sussex, helped King Charles II escape from England to France in 1651 after he had been on the run from the Battle of Worcester. He lent the King a ship so that he could escape to France.

In character, he was described as "strict and severe", but also as a man who was held in great affection and respect by his friends.
