= List of politicians, lawyers, and civil servants educated at Jesus College, Oxford =

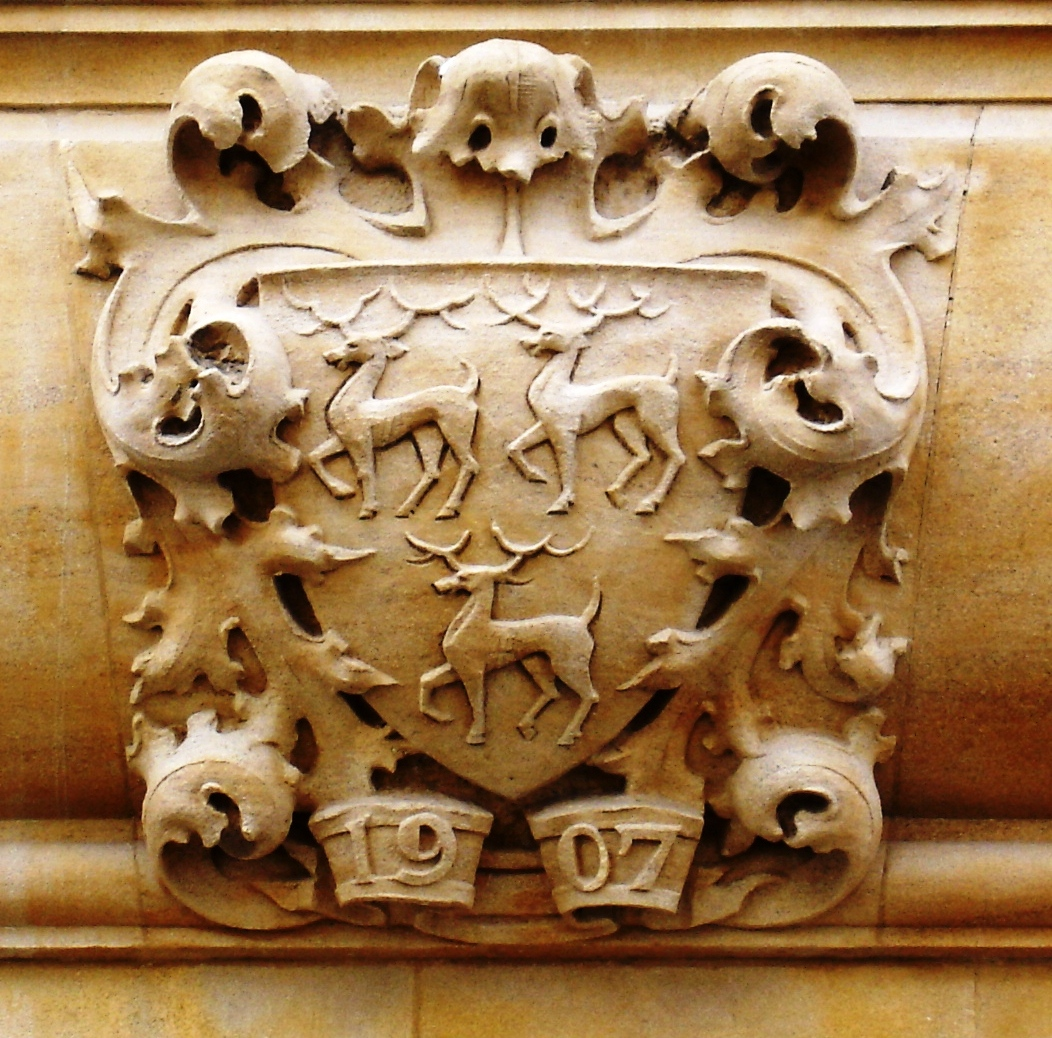
The crest of Jesus College above the entrance on Ship Street

Jesus College is one of the constituent colleges of the University of Oxford in England. The college was founded in 1571 by Queen Elizabeth I at the request of Hugh Price, a Welsh clergyman, who was Treasurer of St David's Cathedral in Pembrokeshire. The college still has strong links with Wales, and about 15% of students are Welsh. There are 340 undergraduates and 190 students carrying out postgraduate studies. Women have been admitted since 1974, when the college was one of the first five men's colleges to become co-educational. Old members of Jesus College are sometimes known as "Jesubites".

Harold Wilson studied at Jesus College from 1934 to 1937, and was later the prime minister of the United Kingdom during two periods (from October 1964 to June 1970, and from March 1974 to April 1976). More than 30 other Members of Parliament (MPs) have been educated at the college, from Sir John Salusbury who was elected as MP for Denbighshire in 1601 to Theresa Villiers who was elected as MP for Chipping Barnet in 2005. Sir Leoline Jenkins, who became a Fellow and later the Principal of the college, was Secretary of State for the Northern Department from 1680 to 1681 and Secretary of State for the Southern Department from 1681 to 1685. Sir William Williams served as Speaker of the House of Commons from 1680 to 1685 and as Solicitor General for England and Wales from 1687 to 1689. Evan Cotton was MP for Finsbury East before holding the position of President of the Bengal Legislative Council from 1922 to 1925. Several Welsh politicians have been educated at the college, some representing constituencies in Wales (such as Sir John Wogan, representing Pembrokeshire at various times between 1614 and 1644) and others working outside Parliament, such as D. J. Williams, a co-founder of the Welsh nationalist party Plaid Cymru.

Other students at the college have subsequently held political offices in other countries. Norman Manley was Chief Minister of Jamaica from 1955 to 1962. P. T. Rajan was Chief Minister of Madras Presidency between April and August 1936. Heather Wilson was the first Old Member of the college to sit in the United States House of Representatives, where she represented New Mexico's 1st congressional district from 1998 to 2009. The Australian politician Neal Blewett was a member of the Australian House of Representatives from 1977 to 1994, a Government Minister from 1983 to 1994 and High Commissioner to the UK from 1994 to 1998. Pixley ka Isaka Seme, who studied for a BCL between 1906 and 1909, was one of the founder members of the African National Congress.

Several prominent judges and lawyers were educated at the college. Viscount Sankey, who was Lord Chancellor from 1929 to 1935, studied for a BA in History and BCL between 1885 and 1891. Lord du Parcq was appointed as a Lord of Appeal in Ordinary in 1946. Sir Richard Richards became Lord Chief Baron of the Exchequer in 1817. The Scottish MP and lawyer Lord Murray was appointed a Senator of the College of Justice in 1979. The solicitor Sir David Lewis was Lord Mayor of the City of London from 2007 to 2008. Other lawyers who studied at the college include James Chadwin QC, who defended the Yorkshire Ripper, and Sir Arthur James, who prosecuted the Great Train Robbers and later became a judge of the Court of Appeal. Academic lawyers include J Duncan M Derrett, Professor of Oriental Laws in the University of London from 1965 to 1982, and Alfred Hazel, Reader in English Law at All Souls College, Oxford.

== Alumni ==
Abbreviations used in the following tables

- M – Year of matriculation at Jesus College (a dash indicates that the individual did not matriculate at the college)
- G – Year of graduation / conclusion of study at Jesus College (a dash indicates that the individual graduated from another college)
- DNG – Did not graduate: left the college without taking a degree
- ? – Year unknown; an approximate year is used for table-sorting purposes.
- (F/P) after name – later became a Fellow or Principal of Jesus College, and included on the list of Principals and Fellows
- (HF) after name – later became an Honorary Fellow of Jesus College, and included on the list of Honorary Fellows

Degree abbreviations

- Undergraduate degree: BA – Bachelor of Arts
- Postgraduate degrees:

- BCL – Bachelor of Civil Law
- MA – Master of Arts
- MPhil – Master of Philosophy
- DCL – Doctor of Civil Law
- DPhil – Doctor of Philosophy

The subject studied and the degree classification are included, where known. Until the early 19th century, undergraduates read for a Bachelor of Arts degree that included study of Latin and Greek texts, mathematics, geometry, philosophy and theology. Individual subjects at undergraduate level were only introduced later: for example, Mathematics (1805), Natural Science (1850), Jurisprudence (1851, although it had been available before this to students who obtained special permission), Modern History (1851) and Theology (1871). Geography and Modern Languages were introduced in the 20th century. Music had been available as a specialist subject before these changes; medicine was studied as a post-graduate subject.

=== Politicians from England and Wales ===
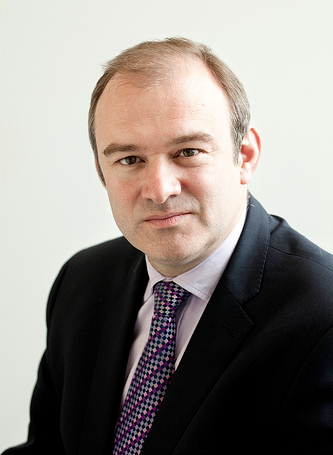
Ed Davey, appointed Secretary of State for Energy and Climate Change in 2012

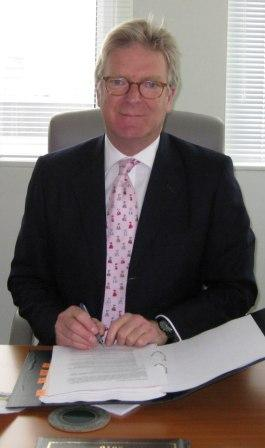
Edward Garnier, MP and former solicitor general for England and Wales

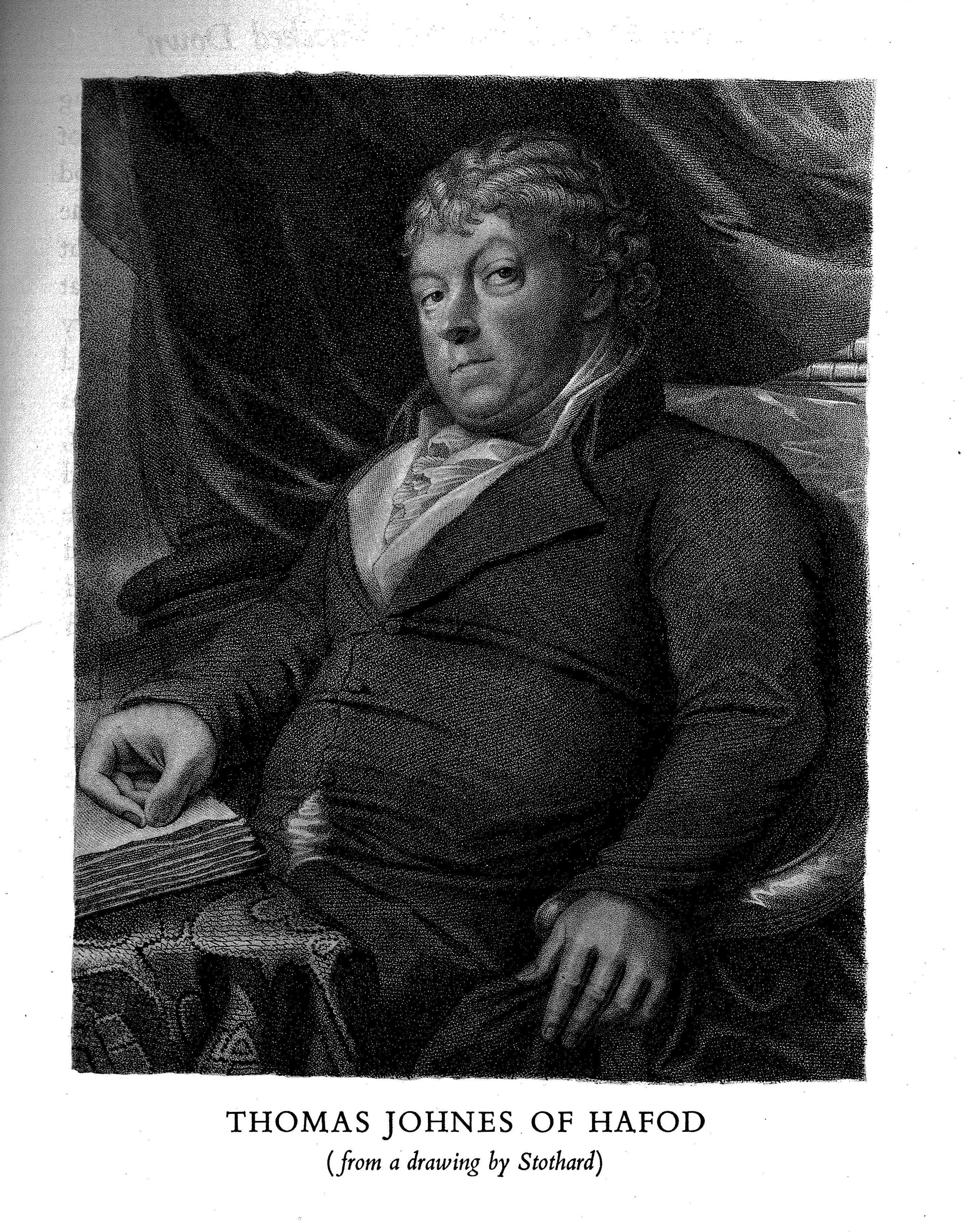
Thomas Johnes, British MP

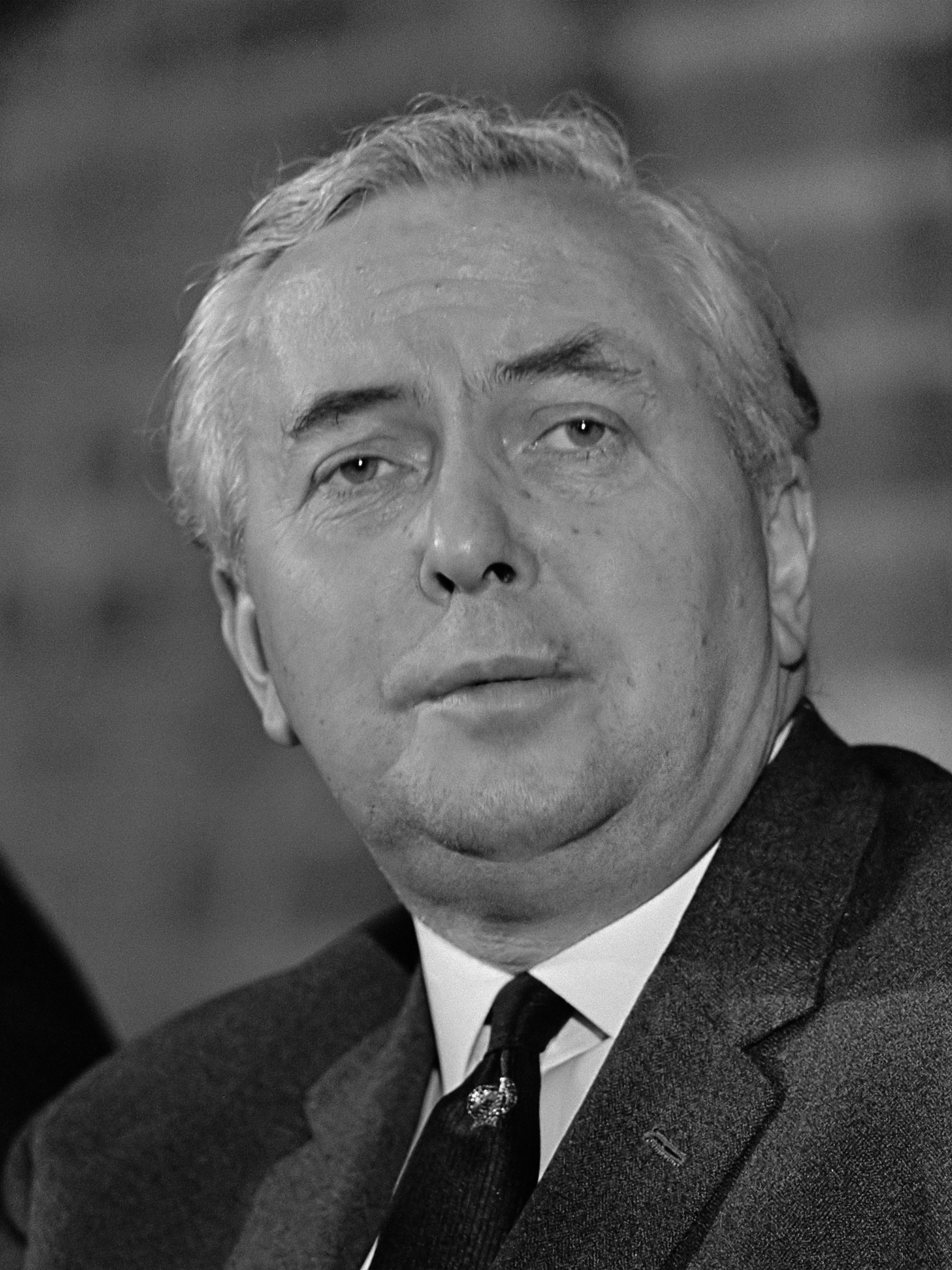
Harold Wilson, former British Labour prime minister

Name	M	G	Degree	Notes	Ref
Sir John Aubrey, 2nd Baronet	1668	DNG	–	MP for Brackley (1698–1700)	
Sir John Aubrey, 3rd Baronet	1698	DNG	–	MP for Cardiff (1706–1710)	
Thomas Bulkeley, 7th Viscount Bulkeley	1769	1773	MA (1773), DCL (1810)	MP for Anglesey (1774–1784); donated the copy of Guido Reni's St Michael subduing the Devil hanging in the college chapel	
Sarah Coombes	2010	2013	BA History and Politics (2013)	MP for West Bromwich (2024–present)	
Sir Evan Cotton	1887	1892	BA Modern History (2nd, 1891), BA Jurisprudence (2nd, 1892) (2nd in Classics Honour Mods, 1889)	Liberal MP for Finsbury East (1918), President of the Bengal Legislative Council (1922–1925)	
J. E. Daniel	1919	1925	BA Literae Humaniores (1st, 1923), BA Theology (1st, 1925)	Welsh theologian and chairman of Plaid Cymru (1939–1943)	
Edward Davey	1985	1988	BA PPE (1st)	President of the Jesus College JCR; became Liberal Democrat MP for Kingston and Surbiton (1997 to date); appointed Secretary of State for Energy and Climate Change in 2012. Since 2020 he has been the leader of the Liberal Democrats.	
Geraint Davies	1978	1982	BA PPE	President of the Jesus College JCR; became Labour MP for Croydon Central (1997–2005)	
Bruce Douglas-Mann	1948	1951	BA PPE (2nd)	Labour MP for Kensington North (1970–1974) and Mitcham and Morden (1974–1982); joined the SDP, but lost his seat at the by-election following his change of party	
Sir Francis Edwards, 1st Baronet	1872	1875	Pass degree	Liberal MP for Radnorshire (1892–1895, 1900 – January 1910 and December 1910 – 1918)	
William Foxwist	1628	DNG	–	Welsh judge who was MP for Caernarfon (1647–1648), Anglesey (1654–1655), Swansea (1659) and St Albans (1660)	
Edward Garnier QC	1971	1974	BA Modern History (3rd)	Conservative MP for Harborough (1992–2017), Solicitor General (2010–2012)	
Sir William Glynne, 1st Baronet	1654	1656	BA	MP for Caernarfon in the Third Protectorate Parliament	
Ian Grist	1957	1960	BA Modern History (2nd)	Labour MP for Cardiff North (1974–1983), then MP for Cardiff Central (1983–1992)	
Leoline Jenkins (F/P)	1641	DNG	–	Studies interrupted by the English Civil War, but awarded DCL in 1661; a lawyer and diplomat who served as Secretary of State (1680–1684)	
Delyth Jewell	?	?	M.St. Celtic studies	Deputy Minister for Social Care, Mental Health and Women's Health since 2026, Plaid Cymru MS for Blaenau Gwent Caerffili Rhymni	
Thomas Johnes	?	?	?	MP for Cardigan, Radnorshire and Cardiganshire in succession between 1775 and 1816; Lord Lieutenant of Cardiganshire (1800–1816)	
Sir Thomas Littleton, 2nd Baronet	1638	DNG	–	MP for Wenlock in the Short and Long Parliaments (1661–1679), then MP for East Grinstead (1679) and Yarmouth (1681)	
Sir Charles Lloyd, 1st Baronet	1679	DNG	–	MP for Cardigan boroughs (1698–1701), High Sheriff of Cardiganshire (1690) and High Sheriff of Carmarthenshire (1716)	
Sir Herbert Lloyd, 1st Baronet	1738	DNG	–	MP for Cardigan boroughs (1761–1768)	
John Meyrick	?	?	?	MP for Pembroke (1702–1708) and Cardigan (1710–1712); later a judge in Anglesey	
Andrew McIntosh, Baron McIntosh of Haringey	1951	1954	BA PPE (2nd)	Former leader of the Labour Group on the Greater London Council; Deputy Government Chief Whip (1997–2003)	
Sir Roger Mostyn, 3rd Baronet	1690	DNG	–	MP who represented Flintshire, Flint and Cheshire between 1701 and 1734	
Sir James Perrot	1586	DNG	–	Welsh writer; MP for Haverfordwest in the reigns of Elizabeth I, James I and Charles I	
James Philipps	1610	?	?	High Sheriff of Cardiganshire in 1649; MP representing Cardiganshire, Pembrokeshire and Cardigan Boroughs between 1653 and 1661	
William Price	1707	DNG	–	High Sheriff of Merionethshire and High Sheriff of Caernarvonshire	
William Bowen Rowlands	1854	1859	BA	Liberal MP for Cardiganshire (1886–1895)	
Tom Rutland	2010	2013	BA Philosophy, Politics and Economics (2013)	President of the Jesus College JCR; President of the Oxford University Students' Union (2013–14); MP for East Worthing and Shoreham (2024–present)	
Sir John Salusbury	1581	DNG	–	MP for Denbighshire in 1601; also wrote sonnets and love lyrics	
Sir Thomas Salusbury, 2nd Baronet	–	1642	DCL	MP for Denbighshire in the Short Parliament of 1640; awarded an honorary DCL by King Charles I during the English Civil War	
Samuel Segal, Baron Segal (HF)	1919	1923	BA Physiology (2nd)	Labour MP for Preston (1945–1950) and Deputy Speaker of the House of Lords (1973–1982)	
Peter Thomas, Baron Thomas of Gwydir (HF)	1938	1946	BA Jurisprudence	Studies interrupted by World War II, when he served in the RAF and was a prisoner of war; then Conservative MP for Conwy (1951–1966) and Hendon South (1970–1987), and Secretary of State for Wales (1970–1974)	
James Tinn	1955	1958	BA PPE (3rd)	Labour MP for Cleveland (1964–1974) and for Redcar (1974–1987)	
John Vaughan, 1st Earl of Carbery	1592	DNG	–	Comptroller to the household of Prince Charles (later King Charles I) and MP for Carmarthenshire; brother of William Vaughan, who also attended the college	
Theresa Villiers	1990	1991	BCL	Conservative MEP for London (1999–2005), MP for Chipping Barnet (2005–2024), Minister of State for Transport (2010–2012), Secretary of State for Northern Ireland (2012–2016) and Secretary of State for Environment, Food and Rural Affairs (2019–2020)	
John White	1607	DNG	–	High Sheriff of Pembrokeshire, MP for Southwark (1640–1645)	
Alan W. Williams	1963	1969	BA Chemistry (1st), DPhil	Labour MP for Carmarthen (1987–1997) and Carmarthen East and Dinefwr (1997–2001)	
Sir Charles Williams	1610	DNG	–	MP for Monmouthshire 1620–1621 and 1640–1641	
D. J. Williams	1916	1918	BA English (4th)	Welsh nationalist and writer; one of the founders of Plaid Cymru in 1925; his thesis was "The nature of literary creation"	
Hugh Williams	1712	DNG	–	MP for Anglesey (1725–1734), grandson of Sir William Williams	
Sir William Williams	1650	DNG	–	MP for Chester (1670–1685), Speaker of the House of Commons (1680–1685) and Solicitor General (1687–89); grandfather of Hugh Williams	
Sir Watkin Williams-Wynn, 3rd Baronet	1710	DNG	–	Welsh politician and prominent Jacobite who was said to have had "a record of idleness and extravagance" at College; awarded an honorary DCL in 1732 and presented a 10 imperial gallons (45 L) punch bowl to College to commemorate this	
Harold Wilson (HF)	1934	1937	BA PPE (1st)	Awarded pre-entry scholarship to read Modern History but changed degree subject; twice served as British prime minister (October 1964 – June 1970 and March 1974 – April 1976)	
Sir John Wogan	1607	DNG	–	MP for Pembrokeshire in the 17th century	
Lewis Wogan	1663	DNG	–	High Sheriff of Pembrokeshire (1672)	
William Wynne	1820	DNG	–	MP for Merioneth (1852–1865), High Sheriff of Merionethshire (1867)	

=== Politicians in other countries ===
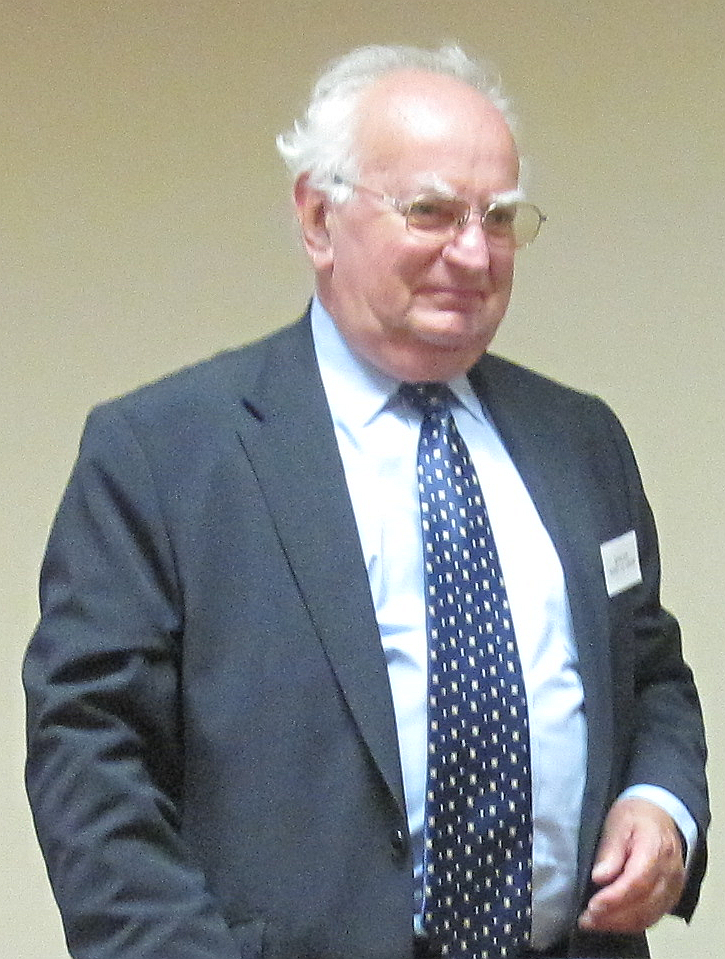
Terry Le Sueur, the Chief Minister of Jersey from 2008 to 2011

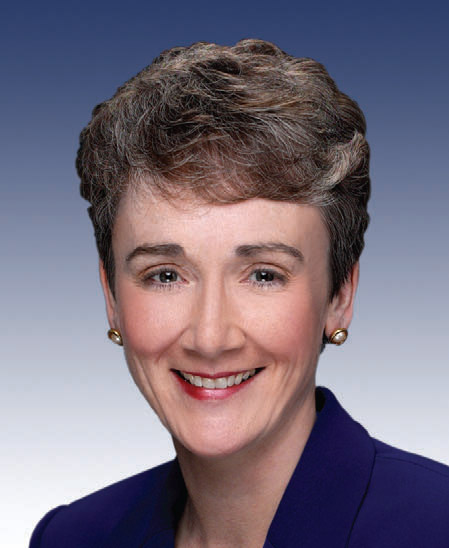
Heather Wilson, former member of the US House of Representatives

Name	M	G	Degree	Notes	Ref
Lalith Athulathmudali	1955	1960	BA Jurisprudence (2nd, 1958), BCL (2nd, 1960)	President of the Oxford Union (1958); a Sri Lankan politician; killed by the Tamil Tigers in 1993	
Neal Blewett (HF)	1957	1959	BA PPE (2nd)	Member of the Australian House of Representatives (1977–1994), Government Minister (1983–1994), High Commissioner to the UK (1994–1998)	
Joseph Clearihue	1911	1914	BA Jurisprudence (2nd, 1913), BCL (3rd, 1914)	Canadian Rhodes scholar; later became a member of the Legislative Assembly of British Columbia and a county court judge; also chairman of the council of Victoria College, British Columbia (which became the University of Victoria under his leadership)	
Don Baron Jayatilaka	1910	1912	BA Jurisprudence (3rd)	Ceylonese statesman (vice-chairman of the Board of Ministers, Leader of the State Council, and Minister for Home Affairs)	
Terry Le Sueur	?	1963	BA Physics (3rd)	Chief Minister of Jersey 2008–2011	
Thomas Lloyd	1658	1661	Law and medicine	Politician in the province of Pennsylvania	
Norman Manley (HF)	1914	1921	BA Jurisprudence, BCL (2nd)	A Rhodes scholar whose studies were interrupted by World War I; Chief Minister of Jamaica (1955–1962)	
P. T. Rajan	1912	1915	BA Modern History (4th)	Chief Minister of Madras Presidency (April – August 1936)	
Harold Rushworth	?	?	BA Jurisprudence	Emigrated to New Zealand in 1923, becoming an MP for the Country Party in 1928	
Pixley ka Isaka Seme	1906	1909	BCL	Founder member of the African National Congress	
Heather Wilson	1982	1985	MPhil (1984), DPhil in International Relations (1985)	Republican member of the US House of Representatives, representing New Mexico's 1st congressional district (June 1998 – January 2009); the first Jesus Old Member elected to the House	

=== Judges ===
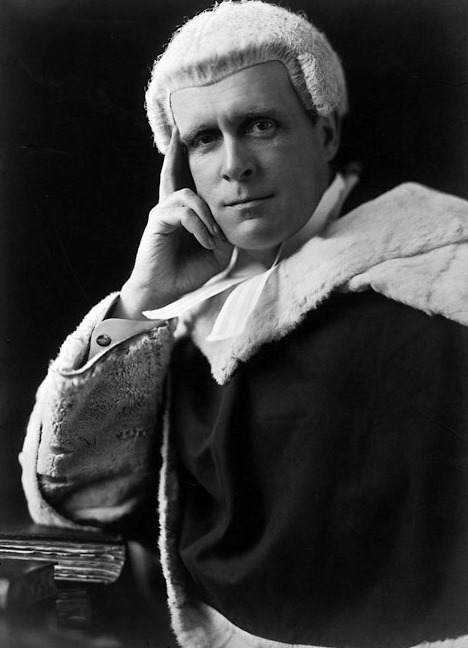
Viscount Sankey

Name	M	G	Degree	Notes	Ref
Austin Amissah	1951	1954	BA Jurisprudence (2nd)	Ghanaian lawyer, judge and academic	
Sir John Blake-Reed (HF)	1901	1905	BA Literae Humaniores (3rd)	British judge in various courts in Palestine, Cairo and Alexandria (1919–1949)	
Herbert du Parcq, Baron du Parcq (HF)	1904	1905	BCL	British judge, appointed a Lord of Appeal in Ordinary in 1946	
William Evans	–	1873	BA Literae Humaniores (1872, 3rd), BA Jurisprudence (4th, 1873)	Matriculated as a non-collegiate student in 1868, transferring to Jesus College in 1869; a barrister and legal author, then a county court judge assigned to mid-Wales; died whilst sitting at Oswestry County Court	
Sir Arthur James (HF)	1934	1938	BA Jurisprudence (1st, 1937), BCL (1st, 1938)	Barrister (who prosecuted the Great Train Robbers) then a judge of the High Court and Court of Appeal	
Sir Vincent Lloyd-Jones (HF)	1921	1924	BA English (2nd, 1923), BA Jurisprudence (3rd, 1924)	High Court judge (1960–1972)	
Michael Long	?	1949	BA Jurisprudence (3rd)	Director of Public Prosecutions for Belize (1980–1981), Resident Judge of the Sovereign Base Areas of Cyprus (1981–1985)	
Ronald Murray, Lord Murray (HF)	1947	1949	?	MP for Edinburgh Leith (1970–1979), Lord Advocate (1974–1979), appointed a Senator of the College of Justice in 1979	
Sir David Poole (HF)	1957	1961	BA Literae Humaniores (2nd)	Barrister, then a High Court judge	
Sir John Powell	1650	1653	BA	Judge of the Court of Common Pleas and of the Court of King's Bench; presided over the trial of the Seven Bishops in 1688	
Sir Richard Richards	1771	–	–	Transferred to Wadham College and then The Queen's College; an MP (briefly) who became Lord Chief Baron of the Exchequer	
John Sankey, 1st Viscount Sankey (HF)	1885	1891	BA Modern History (2nd, 1889), BCL (3rd)	Lord Chancellor (1929–1935), also High Steward of Oxford University	
John Seys-Llewellyn	1931	1934	BA French and German (2nd)	Barrister (who participated in the prosecution of the Nuremberg Trials); later a county court judge	

=== Other lawyers ===
Name	M	G	Degree	Notes	Ref
James Chadwin QC	1951	?	?	Barrister; defended the Yorkshire Ripper	
Charles Clark	1954	1957	BA Jurisprudence (3rd)	Lawyer and publisher; an expert on copyright	
J Duncan M Derrett	1940	1947	BA Modern History	Professor of Oriental Laws in the University of London (1965–1982)	
Sir David William Evans	1885	1888	?	Welsh solicitor who was director and legal advisor of the King Edward VII National Memorial Association for the Prevention and Treatment of Tuberculosis, and knighted for public services to Wales; previously won his "Blue" in rugby (1887 and 1888) and played as a Welsh rugby union international, winning six caps (1889–1891)	
Sidney Hayward QC	1919	1922	BA Jurisprudence (2nd) (1st class in Mods in Mathematics)	Barrister and writer on housing and planning law	
Alfred Hazel (F/P)	1888	1894	BA Literae Humaniores (2nd, 1892), BA Jurisprudence (1st, 1893), BCL (2nd)	All Souls Reader in English Law, Liberal MP for West Bromwich (1906 – January 1910)	
Sir David Lewis (HF)	1966	1969	BA Jurisprudence	Former senior partner of Norton Rose Fulbright, Lord Mayor of London (2007–2008)	
Llywarch Reynolds	1868	1875	BA	Welsh solicitor and Celtic scholar; many of the antiquarian manuscripts he collected are now held by the National Library of Wales	
John Williams	1773	–	–	Transferred to Wadham College and graduated from there; serjeant-at-law and legal writer	
Edward Wynne (F)	1698	1702	BA (1702), MA (1705) BCL and DCL (1711)	Advocate at Doctors' Commons, chancellor of the Diocese of Hereford and an Anglesey landowner	
Edward Wynne	1753	DNG	–	Barrister and legal writer; son of the lawyer William Wynne	
William Wynne	1709	1712	BA	Serjeant-at-law and author of The Life of Sir Leoline Jenkins (1724); son of Owen Wynne and father of barrister Edward Wynne	

=== Civil servants and diplomats ===
Name	M	G	Degree	Notes	Ref
Sir Frederick Atkinson (HF)	1938	1947	BA PPE	Chief Economic Adviser to HM Treasury (1977–1979)	
Sir Goronwy Daniel (HF)	1937	1940	DPhil	Permanent Under-Secretary of the Welsh Office (1964–1969), Principal of University of Wales, Aberystwyth (1969–1979)	
Eryl Davies	1940	1942	BA English	Chief Inspector of Schools for Wales (1972–1982)	
Gunasena de Soyza	1923	1926	BA Literae Humaniores (2nd)	High Commissioner for Ceylon in Britain (1960–1961)	
Sir Walter Jenkins	1893	1897	BA	Director of Naval Contracts at the Admiralty (1919–1936)	
Sir Philip Jones (HF)	1949	1953	BA Literae Humaniores	Civil servant who was later chairman of Total Oil Marine (1990–1998) and chairman of the Higher Education Funding Council for Wales (1996–2000)	
Sir Archibald Lush	?	?	?	Chief Inspector of Schools for Monmouthshire (1944–1964), awarded a knighthood for social services to Wales	
Christopher Lintrup Paus	1900	1904	MA	Diplomat who served at the British Embassy in Oslo as commercial counsellor and as the British consul in Oslo	
Sir Thomas Williams Phillips (HF)	1902	1906	BA Literae Humaniores (1st)	Permanent Secretary of the Ministry of Labour (1935–1944) and Chairman of the War Damage Commission (1949–1959)	
Sir David Roberts	?	?	BA	Diplomat who served as Ambassador to Syria, High Commissioner to Sierra Leone, Ambassador to the United Arab Emirates and Ambassador to Lebanon	
Sir Archibald Rowlands	?	?	BA Modern Languages	Permanent Secretary to the Ministry of Aircraft Production during the Second World War	
Sir Ben Bowen Thomas (HF)	1920	?	BA Modern History	Permanent Secretary to the Welsh Department of the Department of Education (1945–1963), President of University College of Wales, Aberystwyth (1964–1975)	
Sir Edgar Vaughan (HF)	1925	1929	BA Modern History (1st, 1928), BA PPE (1st, 1929)	Ambassador to Colombia (1964–1966)	
Owen Wynne	1668	1672	BA	Secretary to Sir Leoline Jenkins when he was Secretary of State, and for his successors; described as "an early example of the permanent civil servant"	
