= List of honorary fellows of Jesus College, Oxford =

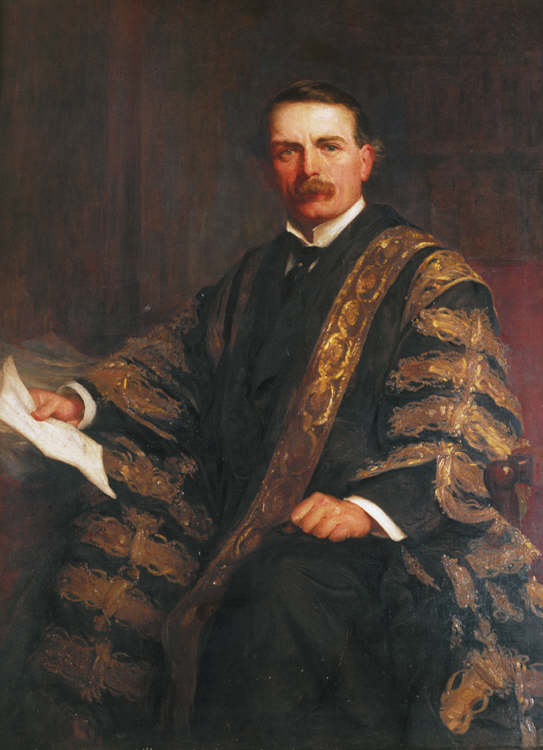
David Lloyd George, pictured in 1911, was elected an Honorary Fellow of Jesus College, Oxford in 1910 and said that he would prize no honour more highly.

The Governing Body of Jesus College, Oxford, (one of the constituent colleges of the University of Oxford in England) has the ability to elect "distinguished persons" to Honorary Fellowships. Under the statutes of the college, Honorary Fellows cannot vote at meetings of the Governing Body and do not receive financial reward. They can be called upon to help decide whether to dismiss or discipline members of academic staff (including the Principal).

The first three Honorary Fellows, all former students of the college, were elected in October 1877: John Rhys, the first Jesus Professor of Celtic who was later an Official Fellow (1881–95) and Principal (1895–1915); the historian John Richard Green; and the poet Lewis Morris. Three other former Principals (John Christie, Sir John Habakkuk and Sir Peter North) have been elected Honorary Fellows on retirement. Many Honorary Fellows had previous academic connections with the college, either as Fellows or Old Members (former students), but others did not. Some of those without previous connections were distinguished Welshmen – Jesus College has had strong links with Wales since its establishment in 1571. For example, the Welsh businessman Sir Alfred Jones was elected in 1902, the Welsh judge Sir Samuel Evans was elected in 1918, and the Welsh opera singer Bryn Terfel was elected in 2008. The Welsh politician David Lloyd George was elected to an Honorary Fellowship in 1910 when he was Chancellor of the Exchequer. He wrote to John Rhys, the Principal at the time, to thank the college for the honour, saying:

I wish to express to you and to the Fellows of Jesus College my deep sense of the great honour which you have done me in electing me to be one of your body. It is a very special gratification to me to be associated in this intimate way with Jesus College. As a Welshman, I have watched with pleasure and pride the prosperity, especially since you have been Principal, of the college which is so closely connected with our country, little thinking ever to find myself a member of it; and I can honestly say that no honour can fall to my lot which I shall prize more highly than this Fellowship which you have conferred upon me. Please accept and express to the Fellows of the college my hearty and sincere thanks. Ever yours sincerely,

— D. LLOYD GEORGE.

The college noted in 1998 that the number of Honorary Fellows was markedly below the average of other Oxford colleges and it adopted a more methodical approach to increase numbers. Seven Honorary Fellows were elected that year, followed by another five in 1999. The first woman to be elected as an Honorary Fellow was the journalist and broadcaster Francine Stock, an Old Member of the college, in 2007. The Honorary Fellows have included two Old Members who later became Prime Minister of their respective countries: Norman Manley, who studied at Jesus College as a Rhodes Scholar and who was Chief Minister of Jamaica from 1955 to 1962, and Harold Wilson, who was twice British Prime Minister (1964–70 and 1974–76). As of 2015, the longest-serving Honorary Fellow is Frederick Atkinson, elected in 1979.

== Honorary Fellows ==
The abbreviations used in the "Link" column denote the person's connection with the college before election as an Honorary Fellow:

- CL – A college lecturer: Joliffe taught students at Jesus College, but he was not one of the Fellows
- F – A former Fellow of the college, included on the list of Principals and Fellows
- OM – Old Member of the college, included on the list of alumni
- P – Principal, also included on the list of Principals and Fellows

A dash denotes that the person had no previous academic link with the college.

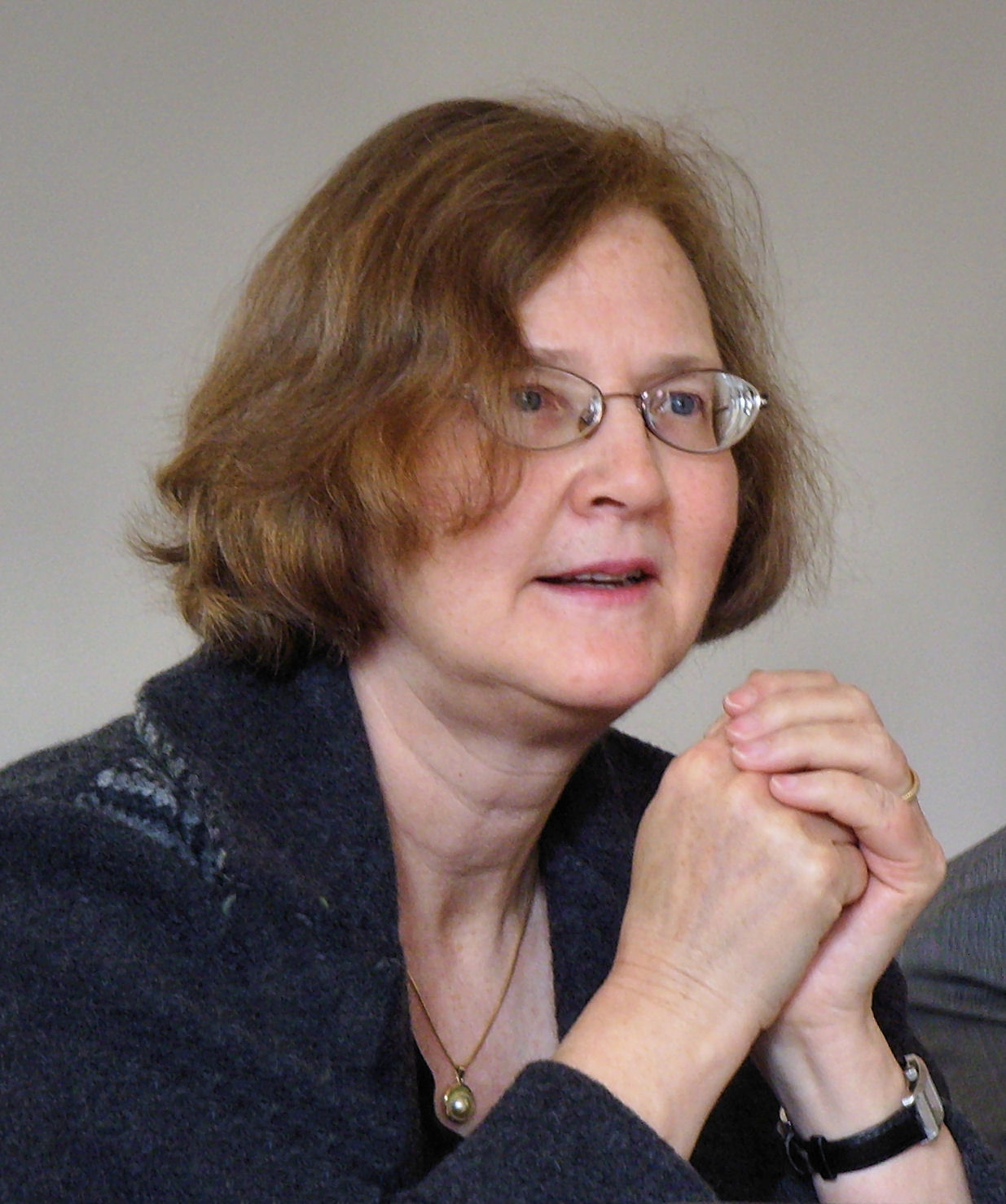
Elizabeth Blackburn was awarded a Nobel Prize in 2009 and appointed an Honorary Fellow in 2011.

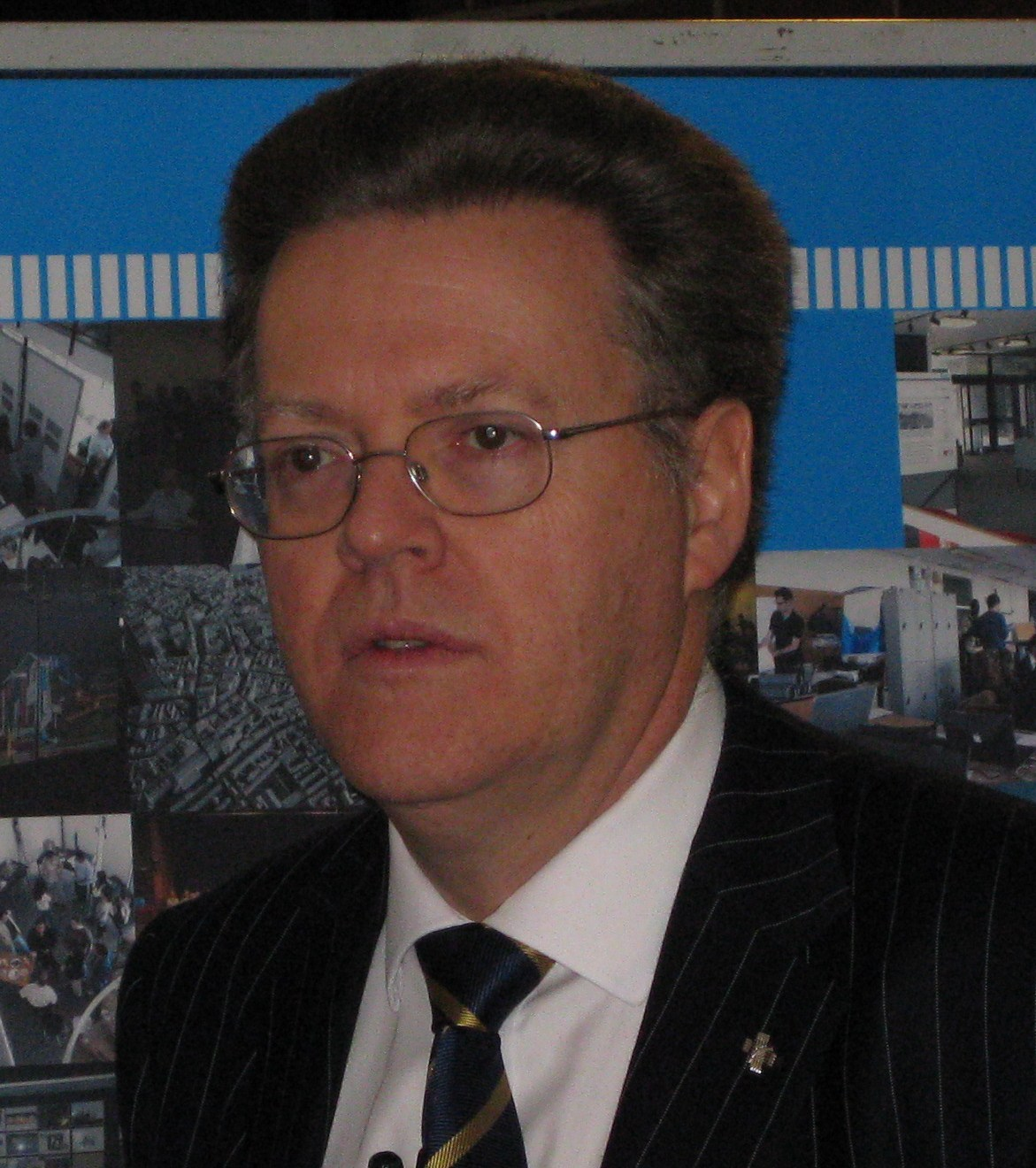
Keith Burnett, a student from 1972 to 1979, was appointed an Honorary Fellow in 2007.

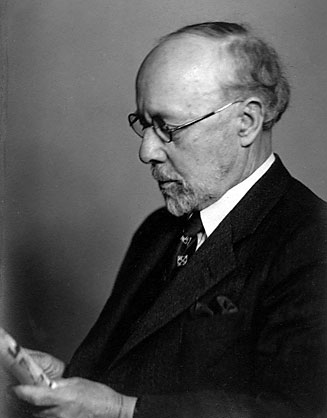
John Garstang, a student from 1895 to 1899, was appointed an Honorary Fellow in 1956.

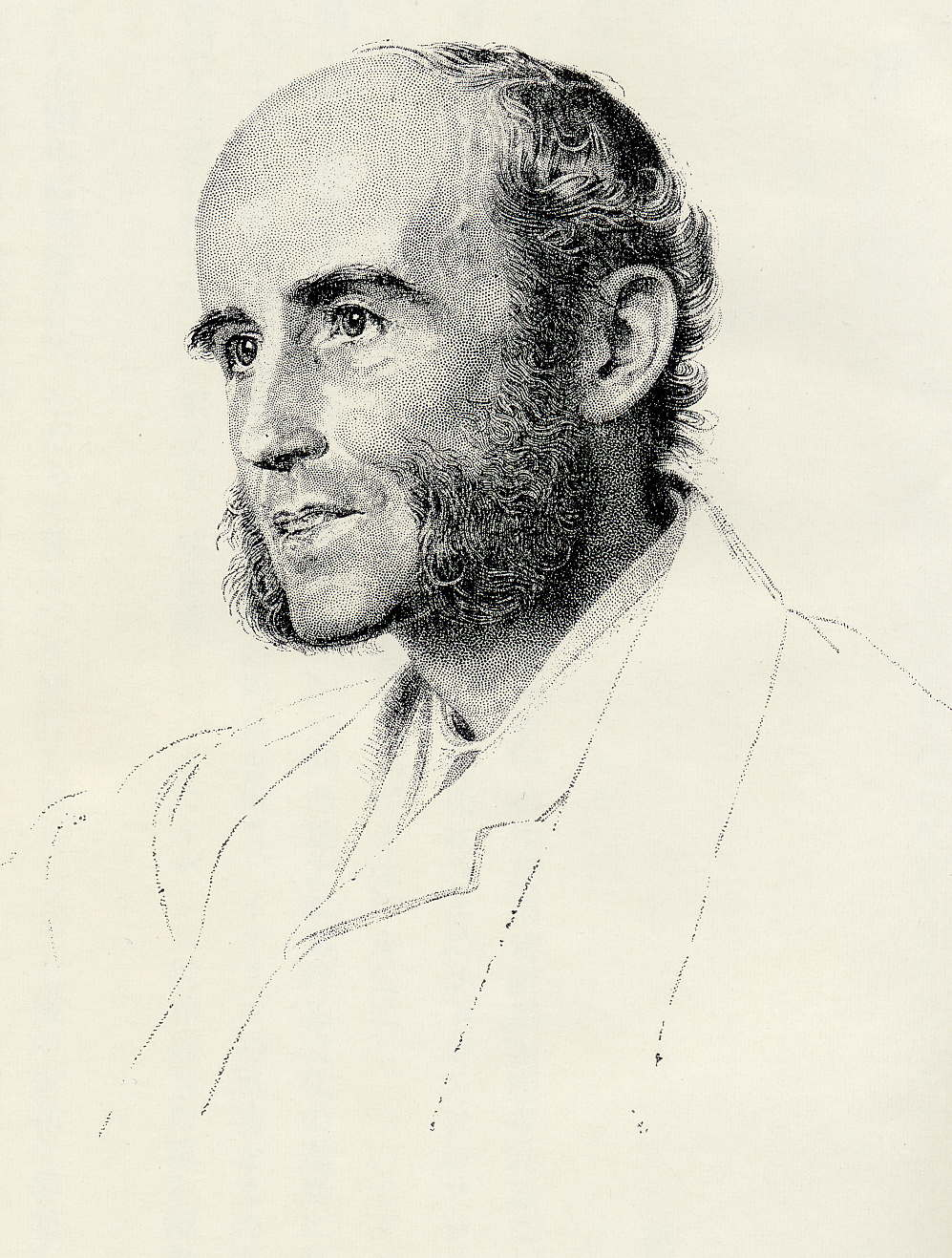
John Richard Green, one of the first Honorary Fellows in 1877, was a student from 1856 to 1859.

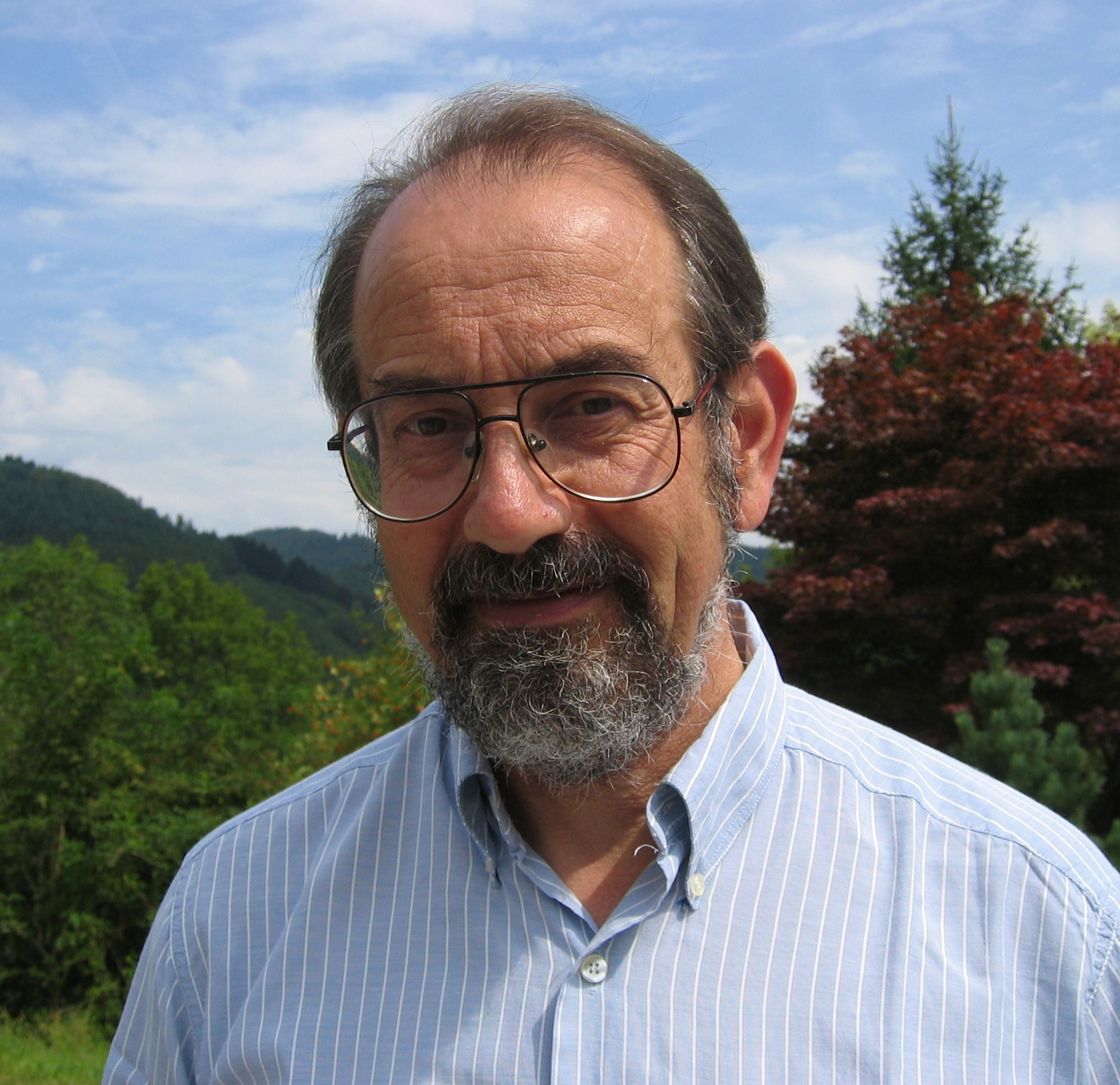
Nigel Hitchin, appointed an Honorary Fellow in 1998, was a student from 1965 to 1968.

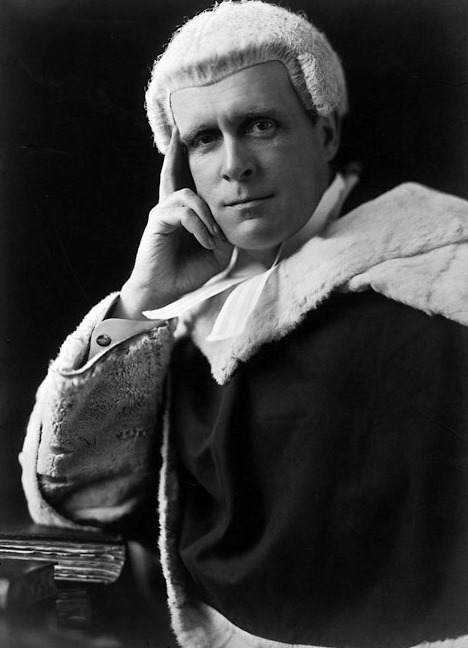
Lord Sankey, appointed an Honorary Fellow in 1917, was a student from 1885 to 1891.

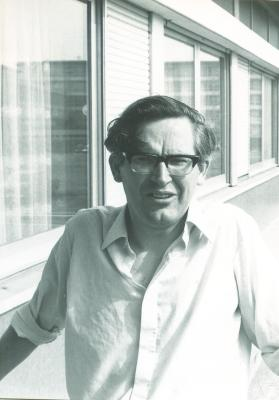
David Williams, appointed an Honorary Fellow in 2008, was a student from 1956 to 1962.

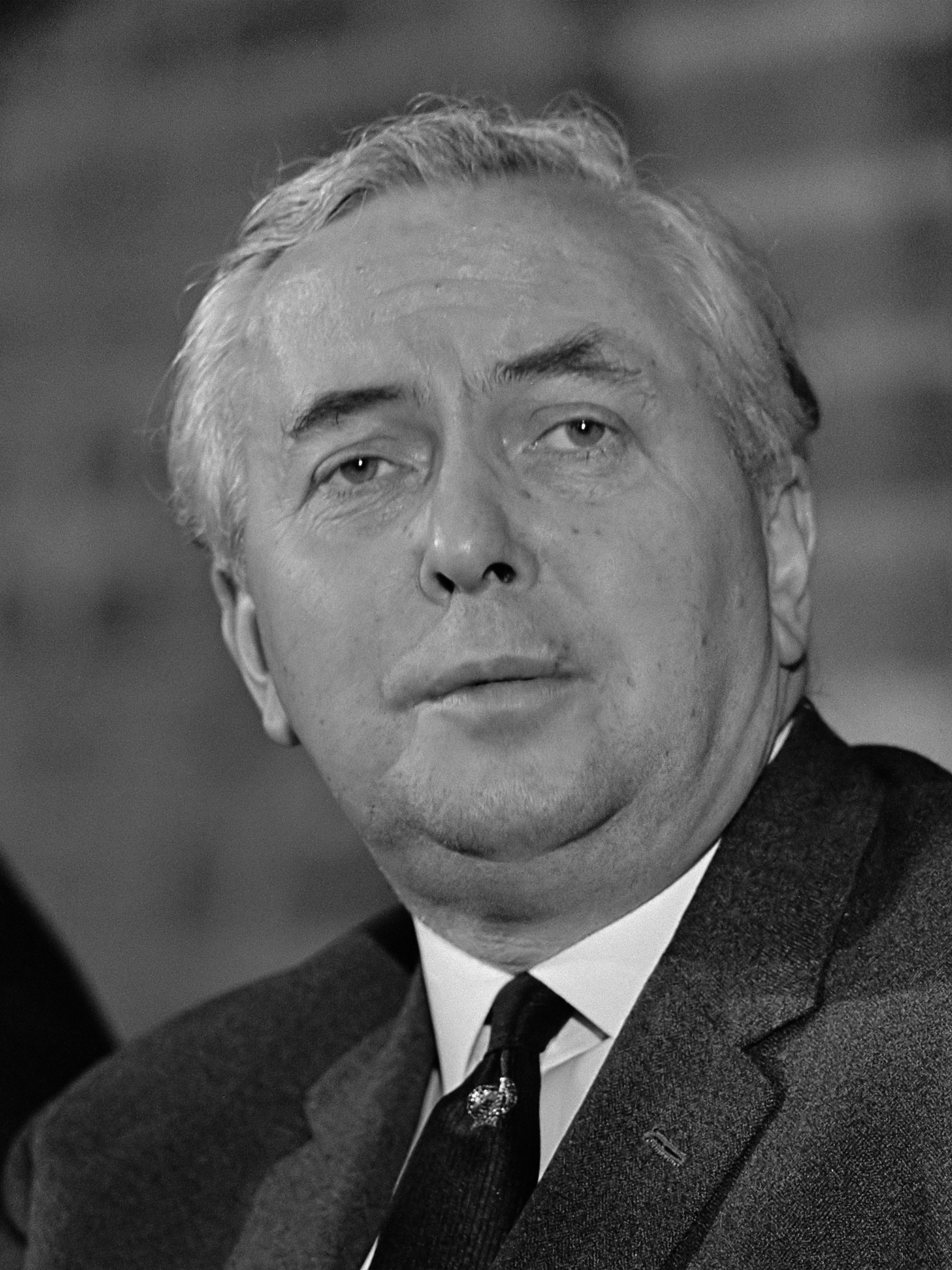
Harold Wilson, a student from 1934 to 1937, was appointed an Honorary Fellow in 1963.

A list of the college's Honorary Fellows
Name	Year elected	Link	Notes	Ref
Anatole Abragam	1976	OM	French physicist, who was also an Honorary Fellow of Merton College, Oxford	
Roger Ainsworth	2002	OM	Master of St Catherine's College, Oxford (2002 onwards) and professor of sngineering science at Oxford University (1998 onwards)	
Sir Thomas Allen	2001	–	Opera singer	
Sir Frederick Atkinson	1979	OM	Civil servant, who served as Chief Economic Adviser to HM Treasury (1977–79)	
Warren Ault	1971	OM	American Rhodes Scholar, who became Huntington Professor of History at Boston University	
Elizabeth Blackburn	2011	–	Molecular biologist who was awarded the Nobel Prize in Physiology or Medicine in 2009; awarded an honorary doctorate by the university in 2011	
Sir John Blake-Reed	1960	OM	Judge in Egyptian courts	
Neal Blewett	1998	OM	Member of the Australian House of Representatives (1977–94) and Minister in various Government departments (1983–94); High Commissioner to the UK (1994–98)	
William Boyd	2007	OM	Novelist and screen	
Clark Brundin	1995	F	Engineer and founding director of the Said Business School	
Sir Keith Burnett	2007	OM	Physicist, and Vice-Chancellor of the University of Sheffield (2007 onwards)	
Sir Cyril Burt	1947	OM	Professor of Education (1924–31) then Professor of Psychology (1931–50), both at the University of London	
Sir John Carter	1998	OM	Chief Executive of Commercial Union (1994–98)	
Sir Geoffrey Cass	1998	OM	Chairman of the Royal Shakespeare Company (1985–2000)	
David Chapman	1944	F	Fellow in Chemistry (1907–44) and Vice-Principal (1926–44), responsible for the college laboratories (which were the last college labs in Oxford)	
John Christie	1967	P	Principal from 1949 to 1967	
Kenneth Cragg	1999	OM	Former Assistant Bishop of Jerusalem, and writer on relations between Islam and Christianity	
Sir Goronwy Daniel	1979	OM	The first Permanent Under-Secretary at the Welsh Office (1964–69), then Principal of the University College of Wales, Aberystwyth (1969–79)	
Sir William Boyd Dawkins	1882	OM	Professor of Geology and Paleontology at the Victoria University of Manchester (1873–1908)	
Herbert du Parcq, Baron du Parcq	1935	OM	British judge, who was appointed a Lord of Appeal in Ordinary in 1946	
Alfred George Edwards	1920	OM	Bishop of St Asaph (1889–1934) and the first Archbishop of Wales (1920–34)	
Sir Goronwy Edwards	1949	F / OM	Professor of History at the University of London and Director of the Institute of Historical Research (1948–60)	
Ellis Evans	1997	F / OM	Jesus Professor of Celtic (1978–96)	
Sir Geraint Evans	1979	–	Welsh opera singer, given an Honorary Fellowship as a tribute to his services to Welsh music and culture	
Sir Richard Evans	1998	OM	Historian, specialising in 20th-century German history	
Sir Samuel Evans	1918	–	President of the Probate, Divorce and Admiralty Division of the High Court (1910–18)	
Sir Christopher Foster	1992	F	Professor of Urban Studies and Economics at the London School of Economics (1976–78), Chairman of the Better Government Initiative (2006 onwards)	
Sir Idris Foster	1978	F	Jesus Professor of Celtic (1947–78)	
John Garstang	1956	OM	Archeologist	
John Richard Green	1877	OM	Historian, author of A History of the English People	
R. Geraint Gruffydd	1992	OM	Professor of Welsh at University of Wales, Aberystwyth (1970–79), Director of the Centre for Advanced Welsh and Celtic Studies (1985–93)	
Sir John Habakkuk	1984	P	Principal from 1967 to 1984, and also served as Vice Chancellor of Oxford University (1973–77)	
Sir John Rigby Hale	1986	F / OM	Historian of the Renaissance	
Raymond Hide	1997	F	Senior Research Fellow (1983–96); geophysicist, working in meteorology, oceanography and geomagnetism	
Nigel Hitchin	1998	OM	Savilian Professor of Geometry (1997 onwards)	
Samuel Hooke	1964	OM	Biblical scholar who was Professor of Old Testament Studies at the University of London	
Sir John Houghton	1983	F / OM	Professor of Atmospheric Physics (1976–83)	
Sir Arthur James	1972	OM	Barrister (who prosecuted the Great Train Robbers) then judge of the High Court (1965–73) and Court of Appeal (1973–76)	
Arthur Jolliffe	1934	CL	Assistant tutor in mathematics at Jesus College (1903–20), then Professor of Mathematics at the University of London (1920–36)	
Sir Alfred Jones	1902	–	Welsh businessman who helped to found the School of Tropical Medicine at the University of Liverpool	
Maurice Jones	1953	F / OM	Principal of St David's College, Lampeter (1923–38)	
Sir Philip Jones	1990	OM	Civil servant, who was later chairman of Total Oil Marine (1990–98) and chairman of the Higher Education Funding Council for Wales 1996–2000	
Sir David Lewis	1998	OM	Former Senior Partner of Norton Rose, who served as Lord Mayor of London (2007–2008)	
Hywel Lewis	1986	OM	Professor of History and Philosophy of Religion, University of London (1955–77)	
Wallace Lindsay	1927	F	Classicist who became Professor of Humanity at St Andrews University in 1899	
David Lloyd George	1910	–	Welsh politician who was Chancellor of the Exchequer (1908–15) and Prime Minister (1916–22)	
Sir Vincent Lloyd-Jones	1960	OM	High Court judge (1960–72)	
Magnus Magnusson	1990	OM	Television presenter (including Mastermind), journalist, translator and writer	
Norman Manley	1958	OM	Chief Minister of Jamaica (1955–62)	
Sir Bernard Miller	1968	OM	Chairman of the John Lewis Partnership (1955–72)	
Alec Monk	1999	OM	Chairman and chief executive of Gateway (1981–89), chairman of Charles Wells (1998–2003)	
Derec Llwyd Morgan	1999	OM	Professor of Welsh (1989–95), then Vice-Chancellor and Principal (1995–2004), at the University of Wales, Aberystwyth	
Sir Lewis Morris	1877	OM	Anglo-Welsh poet, who was elected to an Honorary Fellowship rather than a full Fellowship because he owned too much property to qualify for a Fellowship under the terms of the college statutes then in force	
Ronald Murray, Lord Murray	1999	OM	MP for Edinburgh Leith (1970–79), Lord Advocate (1974–79), Senator of the College of Justice (1979–95)	
Sir Peter North	2005	P	Principal from 1984 to 2005, and also Vice-Chancellor of Oxford University (1993–97)	
Sir Thomas (T. H.) Parry-Williams	1968	OM	Professor of Welsh at the University of Wales, Aberystwyth (1920–52)	
Sir Thomas Williams Phillips	1948	OM	Civil servant, who was Permanent Secretary of the Ministry of Labour (1935–44) and Chairman of the War Damage Commission (1949–59)	
Albert Pollard	1930	OM	Historian, particularly of Henry VIII, and Assistant Editor of the Oxford Dictionary of National Biography	
Sir David Poole	1997	OM	High Court judge	
Sir John Rhys	1877	OM	First Jesus Professor of Celtic (1877–1915), who was an Honorary Fellow (1877–81) before being appointed to a full Fellowship, serving as Bursar (1881–95) and as Principal (1895–1915)	
John Sankey, 1st Viscount Sankey	1917	OM	Lord Chancellor (1929–35), who was also High Steward of Oxford University	
Samuel Segal, Baron Segal	1966	OM	MP for Preston (1945–50), Deputy Speaker of the House of Lords (1973–82)	
Sir Seymour Sharkey	1918	OM	Physician at St Thomas's Hospital, London	
Glyn Simon	1966	OM	Bishop of Llandaff (1957–71) and Archbishop of Wales (1968–71)	
Robert Skidelsky, Baron Skidelsky	1997	OM	Economist and biographer of John Maynard Keynes	
Sir Georg Solti	1990	–	Conductor of the Chicago Symphony Orchestra (1969–91) and the London Philharmonic Orchestra (1979–83); his association with Jesus College began in 1988 when his daughter, Gabrielle, became a student	
Carole Souter	2011	OM	Chief Executive of the Heritage Lottery Fund since 2003	
Robert Steel	1982	F / OM	Geographer, who was a Fellow from 1954 to 1957 before becoming Professor of Geography at Liverpool University (1957–74) and Principal of the University College of Swansea (1974–82)	
Edwin Stevens	1973	OM	Inventor of the world's first wearable hearing aid and a major benefactor to the college; the college flats in North Oxford were named "Stevens Close" to mark his donations	
Francine Stock	2007	OM	Journalist and broadcaster; the college's first female Honorary Fellow	
Walter H. Stockmayer	1976	OM	American Rhodes Scholar; chemist and pioneer of polymer science	
Whitley Stokes	1882	–	Lawyer and Celtic scholar	
Sir Graham Sutton	1958	OM	Director-General of the Meteorological Office (1953–65)	
Sir Bryn Terfel	2008	–	Welsh opera singer	
Sir Ben Bowen Thomas	1963	OM	Permanent Secretary to the Welsh Department of the Department of Education (1945–63), President of University College of Wales, Aberystwyth (1964–75)	
Peter Thomas, Baron Thomas of Gwydir	2001	OM	MP for Conwy (1951–66) and Hendon South (1970–87), Secretary of State for Wales (1970–74)	
Sir James Thursfield	1908	F	Naval historian and journalist, who became the first editor of the Times Literary Supplement in 1902	
Sir Peter Tizard	1983	F	First Professor of Paediatrics at the University of Oxford (1972–83)	
Sir Edgar Vaughan	1966	OM	British Ambassador to Colombia (1964–66)	
Alwyn Williams	1935	OM	Bishop of Durham (1939–52) then Bishop of Winchester (1952–61)	
David Williams	2008	OM	Probability theorist who has been professor of mathematics at Cambridge, Bath and Swansea Universities	
Gwilym Williams	1971	OM	Bishop of Bangor (1957–82) and Archbishop of Wales (1971–82)	
Harold Wilson, Baron Wilson of Rievaulx	1963	OM	Prime Minister (October 1964 – June 1970 and March 1974 – April 1976)	
Clifford Woodward	1935	OM	Bishop of Bristol (1933–46) and Bishop of Gloucester (1946–53)	
Michael Woolfson	1999	OM	Professor of Theoretical Physics at the University of York (1965–94)	
Sir Edward Wright	1963	OM	Professor of Mathematics at Aberdeen University (1936–62), then Principal and Vice-Chancellor of Aberdeen University (1962–76)	
Edwin Yoder	1998	OM	American journalist and Pulitzer Prize winner (1979)	

== See also ==
- List of Honorary Fellows of Keble College, Oxford
