= Edward Wynne =

Edward Wynne may refer to:

- Edward Wynne (colonial administrator), proprietary governor of the Ferryland colony from 1621 to 1626
- Edward Wynne (chancellor) (1681–1755), Welsh lawyer and landowner
- Edward Wynne (jurist) (1734–1784), English lawyer and scholar
- Ed Wynne (born 1961), English guitarist
- Ed Wynne (saxophonist), musician with the Doobie Brothers
- Edward Wynne-Pendarves (1775–1853), British politician

== See also ==
- Ed Wynn (1886–1966), American actor and comedian
- Edward Wynn (1889–1956), English bishop
- William Watkin Edward Wynne (1801–1880), Welsh politician and antiquarian
