= David Willis (linguist) =

British linguist and Celticist

David Willis FBA
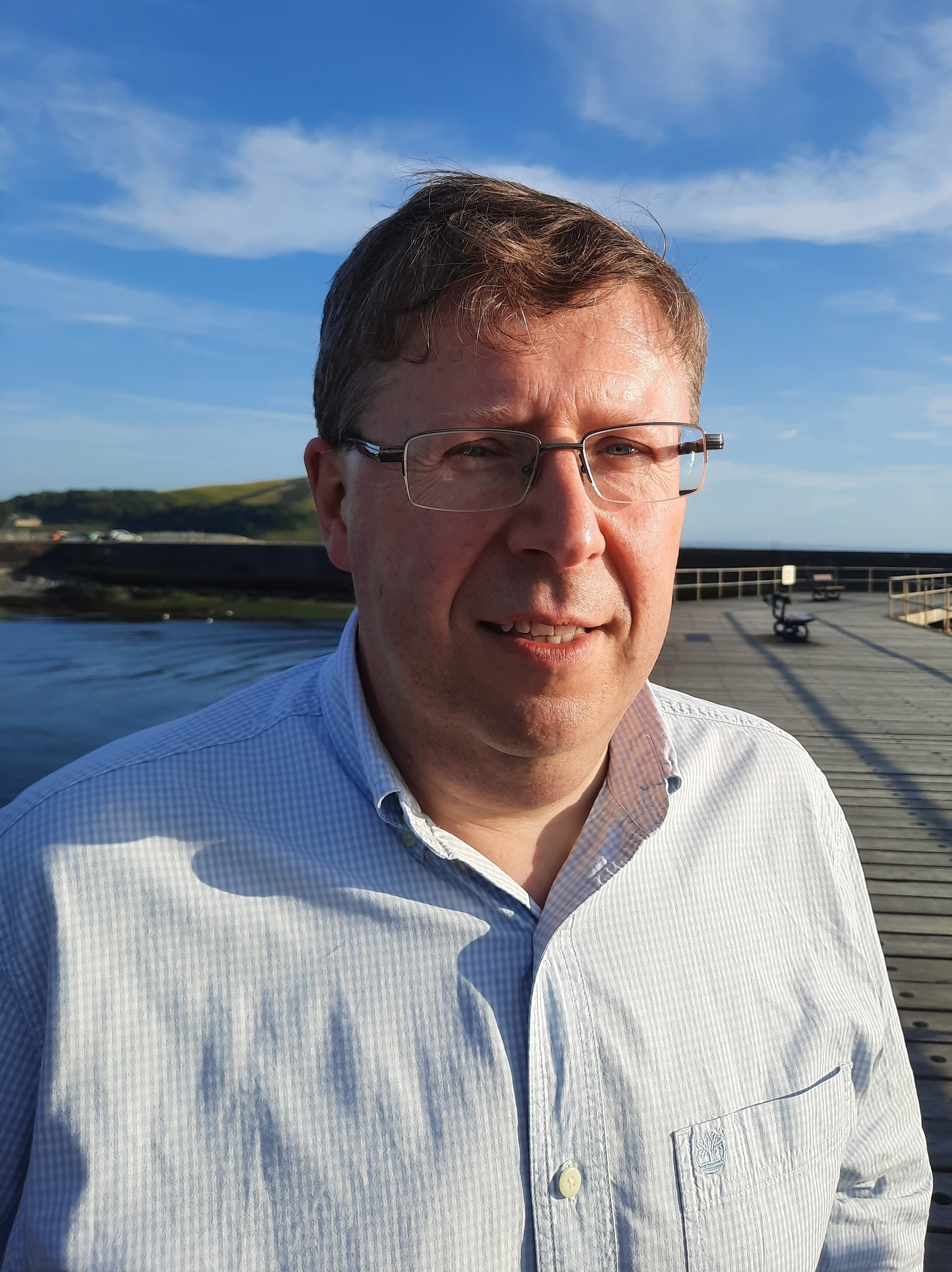
- Born: David W. E. Willis
- Occupations: Linguist and academic
- Title: Jesus Professor of Celtic

Academic background
- Thesis: The loss of verb-second in Welsh: Study of syntactic change (1996)
- Doctoral advisor: Ellis Evans

Academic work
- Discipline: Celtic languages and linguistics
- Institutions: Somerville College, Oxford; University of Manchester; Selwyn College, Cambridge; Jesus College, Oxford
- Main interests: language change and syntax
- Notable works: The history of negation in the languages of Europe and the Mediterranean

David W. E. Willis is a linguist and Celticist. In 2020 he took up the post of Jesus Professor of Celtic at the University of Oxford. He had previously held posts in historical linguistics at the University of Manchester and at the University of Cambridge, where he was a Fellow of Selwyn College.

He was a Junior Research Fellow at Somerville College, Oxford. In 2022, he was elected a Fellow of the British Academy (FBA), the United Kingdom's national academy for the humanities and social sciences.

== Education ==
Willis completed a BA in Russian and German and an MPhil in General Linguistics at St John's College, Oxford before transferring to Jesus College for his DPhil on the history of word order in the Welsh language, completed in 1996. Ellis Evans, one of Willis's predecessors in the Jesus Chair of Celtic, served as his doctoral supervisor.

== Research ==
Willis's research is in the areas of language change and syntax, with particular reference to the Celtic and Slavic languages as well as to English. The synchronic and diachronic syntax of Welsh has been a particular focus: his first book was on the loss of verb-second in the history of Welsh, and he has co-authored a textbook on the syntax of the present-day language. He is also an expert in the syntax of negation and on Jespersen's cycle cross-linguistically.

== Selected publications ==
- Willis, David. 1998. Syntactic change in Welsh: A study of the loss of verb-second. Oxford: Oxford University Press. ISBN 9780198237594
- Willis, David. 2000. On the distribution of resumptive pronouns and wh-trace in Welsh. Journal of Linguistics 36(3), 531–573.
- Borsley, Robert, Maggie Tallerman, and David Willis. 2007. The syntax of Welsh. Cambridge: Cambridge University Press. ISBN 9780511486227
- Willis, David. 2007. Syntactic lexicalization as a new type of degrammaticalization. Linguistics 45(2), 271–310.
- Breitbarth, Anne, Christopher Lucas, Sheila Watts, and David Willis (eds.). 2009. Continuity and change in grammar. Amsterdam: John Benjamins. ISBN 9789027255426
- Willis, David, Christopher Lucas, and Anne Breitbarth (eds.). 2013. The history of negation in the languages of Europe and the Mediterranean, Volume I: Case studies. Oxford: Oxford University Press. ISBN 9780199602537
- Breitbarth, Anne, David Willis, and Christopher Lucas (eds.). 2020. The history of negation in the languages of Europe and the Mediterranean, Volume II: Patterns and processes. Oxford: Oxford University Press. ISBN 9780199602544
