= Thomas Charles-Edwards =

Emeritus academic at Oxford University

Thomas Charles-Edwards FRHistS FLSW FBA
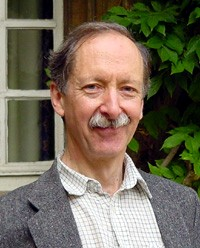
- Born: Thomas Mowbray Owen Charles-Edwards; 11 November 1943 (age 82)

Academic background
- Education: Ampleforth College
- Alma mater: Corpus Christi College, Oxford; Dublin Institute for Advanced Studies

Academic work
- Discipline: History
- Institutions: Corpus Christi College, Oxford; Jesus College, Oxford
- Main interests: Irish Dark Age

Thomas Mowbray Owen Charles-Edwards (born 11 November 1943) is an emeritus academic at the University of Oxford. He formerly held the post of Jesus Professor of Celtic and is a Professorial Fellow at Jesus College.

== Biography ==
He was educated at Ampleforth College before reading History at Corpus Christi College, Oxford, where he studied for a doctorate after taking the Diploma in Celtic Studies under Sir Idris Foster. He studied at the Dublin Institute for Advanced Studies from 1967 to 1969. He then was a junior research fellow and then a fellow in history at Corpus Christi College before being appointed to the chair of Celtic.

His expertise is in the fields of the history and language of Wales and Ireland, during the so-called Irish Dark Age (during the Roman Empire) and the general "Dark Ages", which followed the collapse of the Roman Empire in the west.

He is a Fellow of the Royal Historical Society, a Fellow of the British Academy and a Founding Fellow of the Learned Society of Wales. He was elected honorary member of the Royal Irish Academy in 2007.

He is a great-grandson of Thomas Charles Edwards, first Principal of Aberystwyth University.

== Publications ==
- Charles-Edwards, Thomas (1971). "The Date of the Four Branches of the Mabinogi". Transactions of the Honourable Society of Cymmrodorion (1971, Part 2): 263–298. hdl:10107/1418639.
- — (1978). "Honour and Status in some Irish and Welsh Prose Tales". Ériu. 29. Royal Irish Academy: 123–141. JSTOR 30007769.
- — (1978). "The Authenticity of the Gododdin: An Historian's View". In Bromwich, R.; Brinley Jones, R. (eds.). Astudiaethau ar yr Hengerdd: Studies in Old Welsh Poetry, cyflwynedig i Syr Idris Foster. Cardiff: University of Wales Press. pp. 44–71. ISBN 0708306969.
- —; Kelly, Fergus, eds. (1983). Bechbretha: an Old Irish law-tract on bee-keeping. Early Irish Law Series. Vol. 1. Dublin Institute for Advanced Studies. ISBN 9781855002098.
- —; Owen, Morfydd; Walters, D. B., eds. (1986). Lawyers and Laymen: Studies in the History of Law presented to Professor Dafydd Jenkins on his seventy-fifth birthday. Cardiff: University of Wales Press. ISBN 0708309259.
- — (1989). The Welsh Laws. Writers of Wales. Cardiff: University of Wales Press. ISBN 070831032X.
- — (1991). "The Arthur of History". In Bromwich, R.; Jarman, A. O. H.; Roberts, B. F. (eds.). The Arthur of the Welsh: The Arthurian legend in Medieval Welsh Literature. Arthurian Literature in the Middle Ages. Vol. 1. Cardiff: University of Wales Press. pp. 15–32. ISBN 0708313078.
- —, ed. (25 March 1993). Early Irish and Welsh Kinship. Oxford: Clarendon Press. ISBN 9780198201038.
- — (30 November 2000). Early Christian Ireland. The Cambridge History of Ireland. Cambridge University Press. ISBN 0521363950.
- —; Owen, Morfydd; Russell, Paul, eds. (April 2002). The Welsh King and His Court. Cardiff: University of Wales Press. ISBN 9780708316276.
- —, ed. (13 November 2003). After Rome. Short Oxford History of the British Isles. Oxford University Press. ISBN 9780199249824.
- —; Russell, Paul, eds. (2005). Tair Colofn Cyfraith. The Three Columns of Law in Medieval Wales: Homicide, Theft and Fire. Vol. 5. Bangor: Welsh Legal History Society. ISBN 0954163745.
- — (29 November 2012). Wales and the Britons 350–1064. Oxford History of Wales. Oxford University Press. ISBN 978-0-19-821731-2.
- —; Reid, Julian (31 August 2017). Corpus Christi College, Oxford: A History. Oxford University Press. ISBN 978-0-19-879247-5.
