= Maggie Tallerman =

British linguist (born 1957)

Academic background
- Education: University of Hull

Academic work
- Discipline: Linguistics
- Institutions: Newcastle University; Durham University

Maggie Tallerman is a professor of linguistics at Newcastle University. Her research interests include Celtic linguistics, language origins and evolution (evolutionary linguistics), language typology, morphology and morphosyntax. She is a leading expert in the fields of language evolution and syntax of the Welsh language.

== Education ==
Tallerman gained her PhD from the University of Hull in 1987 on the ‘Mutation and the syntactic structure of Modern Colloquial Welsh’ under the supervisor Nigel B Vincent. She gained her B.A. (Hons) in 1979 in linguistics, also at the University of Hull.

== Career ==
Tallerman has previously held positions at the University of Durham, Department of Linguistics, as Lecturer, Senior Lecturer and Reader (1982-2004).

Tallerman's research interests include Celtic linguistics, language origins and evolution. Her particular interests include Brythonic Celtic and Language Evolution.

== Publications ==
Her works include:

- 2015 Understanding Syntax published by Routledge.
- 2012 with Kathleen Gibson, editor The Oxford Handbook of Language Evolution.
- 2007 with Robert D. Borsley and David Willis. The Syntax of Welsh. Cambridge: Cambridge University Press, 2007.
- Tallerman, Maggie. VSO word order and consonantal mutation in Welsh. Linguistics 1990, 28, 389–416.

== Memberships ==
- EVOLANG - The International Conferences on the Evolution of Language: http://www.evolang.org/
- Linguistics Association of Great Britain
- Linguistic Society of America
- Philological Society
