= Borsley =

Borsley is a surname. Notable people with the surname include:

- Bob Borsley (born 1959), British sport shooter
- Robert D. Borsley (born 1949), British linguist
