= Stuart Archibald Moore =

English antiquarian (1842–1907)

- Born: September 1842
- Died: 29 June 1907 (aged 64); Southwick
- Occupation: Antiquarian

Stuart Archibald Moore (September 1842 – 29 June 1907) was an English legal antiquarian.

== Biography ==
Moore was born in September 1842. He was the fourth son of Barlow Brass Moore of The Lawn, South Lambeth, Surrey, by his wife Harriet Adcock. Educated at the Philological School, Marylebone Road, he became secretary to Sir Thomas Duffus Hardy, deputy keeper of the public records, and afterwards practised as a record agent. Elected F.S.A. on 2 May 1869, he contributed to 'Archæologia' in 1886 a paper on the 'Death and Burial of King Edward II.' Moore quickly obtained distinction as an antiquarian lawyer and an authority on questions relating to foreshore, fishery, and cognate matters. On 24 January 1880, somewhat late in life, he became a student of the Inner Temple, and being called to the bar on 25 June 1884, at once obtained a lucrative practice. He fought with great pertinacity and success the claims of the crown to foreshore, arguing that the crown parted long ago with its foreshore rights to the lords of manors bounded by the sea. His 'History of the Foreshore and the Law relating thereto' (1888) is full of interesting extracts from ancient records, and constitutes the subject's brief against the crown.

Moore loved yachting, and was one of the finest amateur seamen of his time; he commanded his own 80-ton fishing ketch. in which he carried the vice-commodore's flag of the Royal Cruising Club all round Great Britain and the greater part of Ireland, with little regard for weather. He was a frequent correspondent of 'The Times,' chiefly on yachting and other seafaring matters. About two years before his death he was seized with paralysis of the lower limbs and retired to his vessel, in which he continued to live, bearing his affliction with courage and cheerfulness. Shortly before his death he wrote two letters to 'The Times' on secret commissions (8 Jan.) and on the Channel tunnel (8 Feb.). He died somewhat suddenly on 29 June 1907, on board his yacht at Southwick, and was buried there. He married Isabel Kate, daughter of John Knight Higgins of Southampton, and had issue two sons. Besides the work mentioned, he published: 1. 'The Thames Estuary : its Tides, Channels, &c., a Practical Guide for Yachts,' 1894. 2. 'History and Law of Fisheries ' (with his son 'Hubert Stuart Moore), 1903. He also edited 'Letters and Papers of J. Shillingford, 1447–50,' for the Camden Society (1871), and 'Cartularium Monasterii Sancti Johannis Baptiste in Colecestria,' for the Roxburghe Club (1897), as well as 'Domesday Book for Northamptonshire, extended and translated,' 1863.
