= Kenneth Morgan, Baron Morgan =

Welsh historian and author (born 1934)

The Right Honourable The Lord Morgan FRHistS FBA FLSW
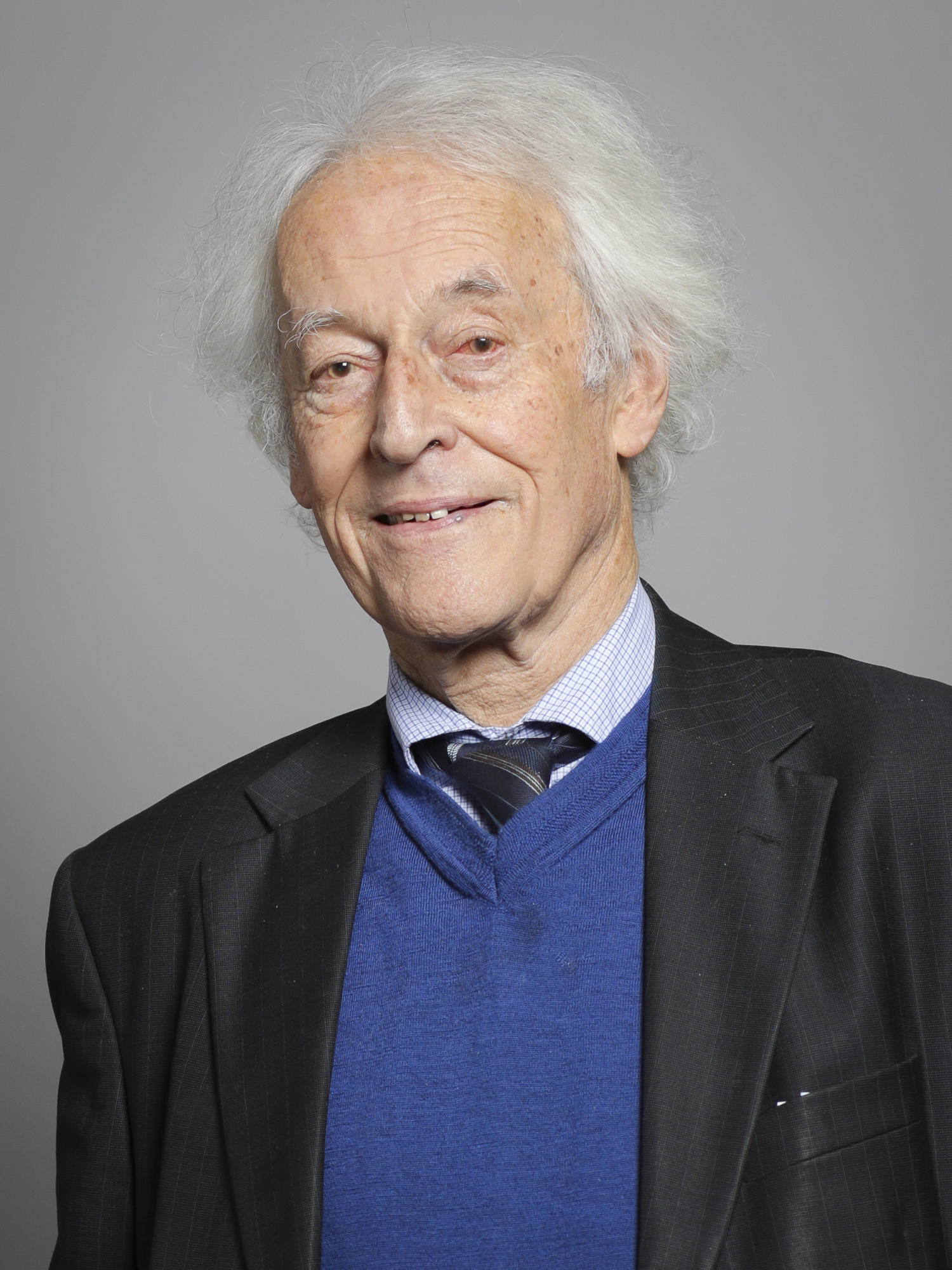

Member of the House of Lords
- Lord Temporal
- Life peerage 12 June 2000

Vice-Chancellor of the University of Wales, Aberystwyth
- In office 1989–1995
- Preceded by: Gareth Owen
- Succeeded by: Derec Llwyd Morgan

Personal details
- Born: 16 May 1934 (age 92)
- Party: Labour
- Spouses: Jane Morgan (d. 1992); Elizabeth Gibson (m. 2009)
- Education: Oriel College, Oxford
- Occupation: Historian

Kenneth Owen Morgan, Baron Morgan, FRHistS FBA FLSW (born 16 May 1934) is a Welsh historian and author, known especially for his writings on modern British history and politics and on Welsh history. He is a regular reviewer and broadcaster on radio and television. He has been an influential intellectual resource in the Labour Party.

== Life ==
He grew up in rural Wales and attended Aberdovey Council School in rural Wales, University College School in Hampstead (in London), and Oriel College, Oxford. The first two appealed to him. As for Oxford he recalled, "The disagreeable nature of the undergraduates was matched by the mediocrity of the tutors. They were astonishingly poor ... All in all, Oriel seemed more like a backwoods seminary of mid-Victorian days than a modern educational institution." He had better luck outside his insular college. "On the intellectual side, I attended a variety of lectures which seemed to me brilliant and what I really needed in Oxford, by people like Asa Briggs, Christopher Hill, Hugh Trevor-Roper, and the incomparable and deeply entertaining Alan Taylor." He returned to Oxford for doctoral work, specializing in the role of Wales in British politics in the late 19th century, with a focus on Gladstone. He greatly enjoyed graduate work, taking his DPhil in 1958.

He taught at University of Wales Swansea from 1958 to 1966 and held an ACLS Fellowship at Columbia University, New York in 1962–1963, also teaching there in 1965. He was a Fellow of Queen's College, Oxford, from 1966 to 1989 and served as Vice-Chancellor of the University of Wales from 1989 to 1995. In this capacity, he served as a Welsh Supernumerary Fellow of Jesus College, Oxford, from 1991 to 1992. He was principal of the University of Wales, Aberystwyth in the 1990s.

In 1983 he was elected Fellow of the British Academy and in 1992 he was made an Honorary Fellow of Queen's College, Oxford, and in 2002 of Oriel College. He became a Druid of the Gorsedd of Bards in 2008 and in 2009 received the gold medal from the Honourable Society of Cymmrodorion for lifetime achievement. He is also a Founding Fellow of the Learned Society of Wales.

== Politics ==
Morgan is a member of the Labour Party, and on 12 June 2000 he was made a life peer as Baron Morgan, of Aberdyfi in the County of Gwynedd. He has served on the Lords Select Committee on the Constitution.

== Family ==
He was married to the historian and criminologist Jane Morgan, who died in 1992; they had two children together, David and Katherine. In 2009 he married Elizabeth Gibson, senior lecturer in law at the universities of Tours and Bordeaux before she became professor in British studies and law at the university of Poitiers. They have five grandchildren.

== Writing ==
Kenneth Morgan is the author of many works, such as The People's Peace, his notable history of postwar Britain, and has completed biographies of many politicians, including David Lloyd George, Keir Hardie, James Callaghan, and Michael Foot. He is the editor of the best-selling The Oxford Illustrated History of Britain, to which he contributed the two final chapters (1914–2000 and 2000–10), and which has sold close on a million copies.

He also edited the Welsh History Review from 1961 to 2003. Wales in British Politics, 1868–1922, dealt with the enlarged franchise, the campaign for disestablishment, Home Rule legislation (mainly with regard to Ireland) and contrasting attitudes to an imminent World War. Freedom or Sacrilege dealt with contrasting stances on the issue of Welsh church disestablishment but where he came down in favour of the freedom obtained under the latter.

=== Labour history ===
In the 1950s to 1970s, labour history was redefined and expanded in focus by a number of historians, amongst whom the most prominent and influential figures were E. P. Thompson and Eric Hobsbawm. The motivation came from current left-wing politics in Britain and the United States and reached red-hot intensity. Morgan was a more traditional liberal historian who followed the new trends and explains their dynamic:

the ferocity of argument owed more to current politics, the unions’ winter of discontent [in 1979], and rise of a hard-left militant tendency within the world of academic history as well as within the Labour Party. The new history was often strongly Marxist, which fed through the work of brilliant evangelists like Raphael Samuel into the New Left Review, a famous journal like Past and Present, the Society of Labour History and the work of a large number of younger scholars engaged in the field. Non-scholars like Tony Benn joined in. The new influence of Marxism upon Labour studies came to affect the study of history as a whole.

Morgan sees benefits:

In many ways, this was highly beneficial: it encouraged the study of the dynamics of social history rather than a narrow formal institutional view of labour and the history of the Labour Party; it sought to place the experience of working people within a wider technical and ideological context; it encouraged a more adventurous range of sources, ‘history from below’ so-called, and rescued them from what Thompson memorably called the ‘condescension of posterity’; it brought the idea of class centre-stage in the treatment of working-class history, where I had always felt it belonged; it shed new light on the poor and dispossessed for whom the source materials were far more scrappy than those for the bourgeoisie, and made original use of popular evidence like oral history, not much used before.

Morgan tells of the downside as well:

But the Marxist – or sometimes Trotskyist – emphasis in Labour studies was too often doctrinaire and intolerant of non-Marxist dissent–it was also too often plain wrong, distorting the evidence within a narrow doctrinaire framework. I felt it incumbent upon me to help rescue it. But this was not always fun. I recall addressing a history meeting in Cardiff...when, for the only time in my life, I was subjected to an incoherent series of attacks of a highly personal kind, playing the man not the ball, focusing on my accent, my being at Oxford and the supposedly reactionary tendencies of my empiricist colleagues.

== Works ==
- David Lloyd George, Welsh Radical as World Statesman (1963)
- Wales in British Politics, 1868–1922 (1963, rev ed 1992) online
- Freedom or Sacrilege (1966)
- The Age of Lloyd George (1971)
- (ed.) Lloyd George, Family Letters (1973)
- Lloyd George (1974)
- Keir Hardie, Radical and Socialist (1975) online[
- Consensus and Disunity: The Lloyd George Coalition Government 1918–1922 (1979) online
- (jointly with Jane Morgan) Portrait of a Progressive (1980), a biography of Christopher Addison
- David Lloyd George 1863–1945 (1981)
- Rebirth of a Nation: Wales 1880–1980, part of the Oxford History of Wales (1981) online
- Labour in Power, 1945–1951 (1984) online
- (joint ed.) Welsh Society and Nationhood (1984)
- (ed.) The Oxford Illustrated History of Britain (1984, many rev eds down to 2009, almost lm.copies sold)
- Labour People (1987, rev ed 1992)
- (ed.) The Oxford History of Britain (1987, rev ed 2010)
- The Red Dragon and the Red Flag (1989)
- (ed.) The Oxford Mini History of Britain (1989, in 5 vols.)
- Britain and Europe (1995)
- The People's Peace: Britain since 1945 (1989, rev ed 2001)
- Modern Wales, Politics, Places and People (1995)
- (ed.) The Young Oxford History of Britain and Ireland (1996)
- Callaghan: A Life (1997)
- (ed.) Crime, Police and Protest in Modern British Society (1999)
- The Great Reform Act of 1832 (2001)
- The Twentieth Century (2001)
- Universities and the State (2002)
- Michael Foot: A Life (2007)
- Ages of Reform (2011)
- (ed.) 'David Lloyd George 1863–2013' (2013), Journal of Liberal History issue 77, Online,
- Revolution to Devolution: Reflections on Welsh Democracy (2014)
- My Histories (2015)

Academic offices
Preceded by Gareth Owen	Principal, then Vice-Chancellor of the University of Wales Aberystwyth; 1989–1995	Succeeded by Derec Llwyd Morgan
Orders of precedence in the United Kingdom
Preceded by The Lord Hodgson of Astley Abbotts	Gentlemen; Baron Morgan	Followed by The Lord Luce
