= Gareth Owen (zoologist) =

Welsh zoologist and academic

Gareth Owen, CBE (4 October 1922 – 4 May 2002) was a Welsh zoologist and academic. He was Principal of the University College of Wales, Aberystwyth from 1979 to 1989 and additionally Vice-Chancellor of the University of Wales from 1985 to 1987. He had served as a Royal Air Force (RAF) pilot during the Second World War, and then lectured in zoology at the University of Glasgow and Queen's University Belfast.

== Personal life ==
In 1953, Owen married Beti Jones. Together they had three children: one son and two daughters.

== Honours ==
In the 1988 Birthday Honours, Owen was appointed a Commander of the Order of the British Empire (CBE) in recognition of his service as Principal of University College of Wales, Aberystwyth. He was awarded an honorary Doctor of Science (DSc) degree by Queen's University Belfast in 1982, and a Doctor of Laws (LLD) by the University of Wales in 1989.

Academic offices
Preceded by Goronwy Daniel	Principal of the University College of Wales, Aberystwyth; 1979–1989	Succeeded by Kenneth O. Morgan
