= Peter Batkin =

English auctioneer

Peter Batkin

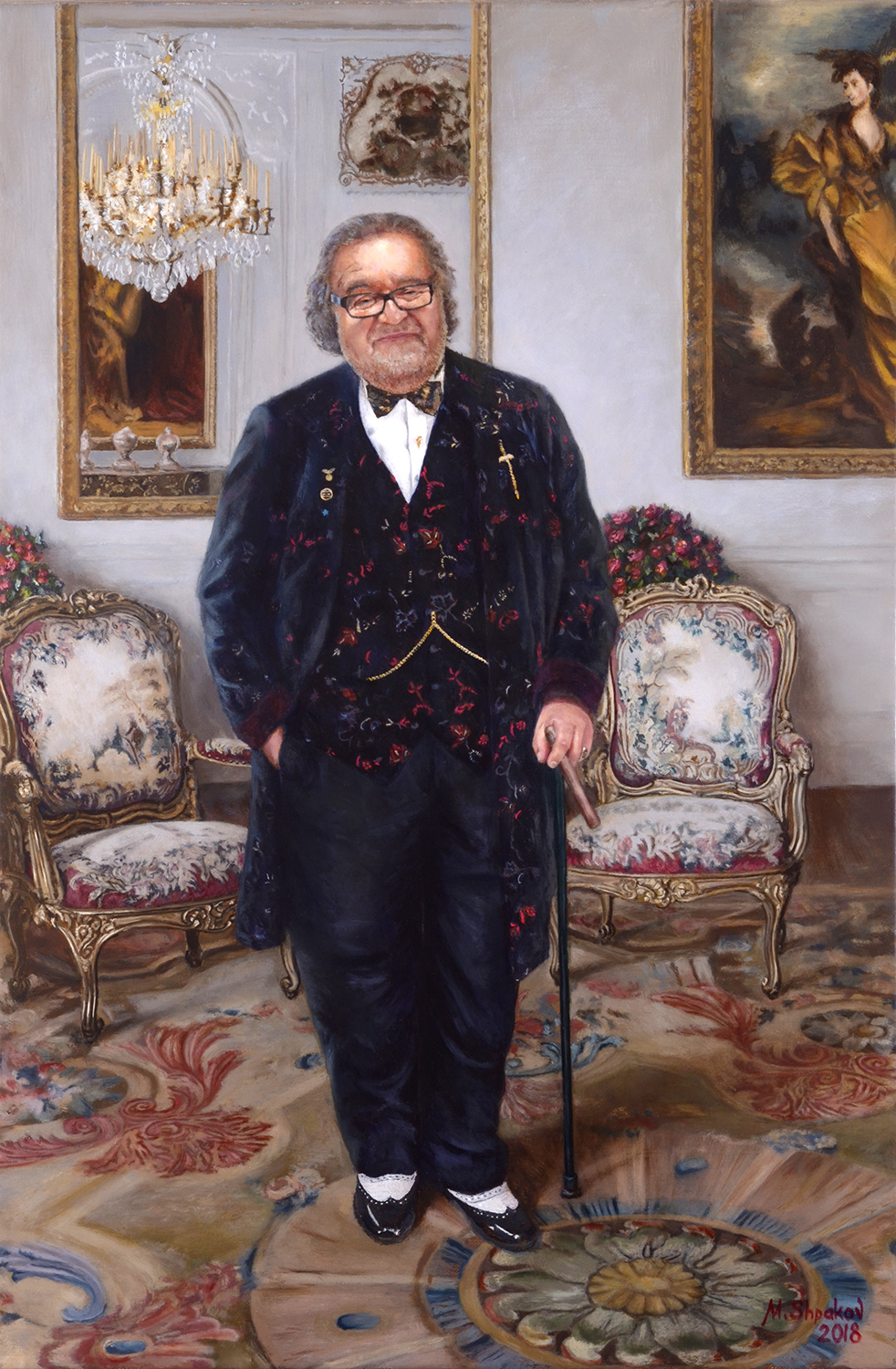
'Peter Batkin, Eccentric Auctioneer' by Michael Shpakov, 2018

Peter Joram Batkin (11 April 1953 – 12 January 2018) was an English auctioneer known for his activities in Russia. He sold the book collection of the spy Kim Philby and was instrumental in the creation of the space memorabilia auction market.

Batkin, who was of Russian descent, attended St Marylebone Grammar School from 1964 to 1971 before starting his career in Sotheby's as a porter; he was to remain with the company from 1973 to 2000, ending his time there as a director and at one time was the company's "man in Russia". According to Art Historian Michel Strauss, Batkin was "an expansive and generous man, immaculately and exotically dressed in a pin-striped suit, bow tie and two-tone shoes" who was "regularly sent out to Russia to make connections with museum and government officials..." He was a familiar sight in the dining clubs of London, was a Freemason and was a member of The Eccentric Club, the latter paying tribute to him as "a true gentleman and a caring soul." His reputation as a cigar smoker is immortalised in a painting hung in the St James, London cigar specialist JJ Fox's.

Very proud of his Jewish heritage, Batkin was a member of Belsize Square Synagogue in London. He lived in Wembley with his wife, Judith Madeline Kellermann. After retiring from the art world Batkin developed his long-running interest in film-making, working on an exposé on corruption in marathon running. With his wife and son, he also started a commercial cleaning firm, Bespoke Cleaning.

Peter Batkin died in January 2018 after suffering a stroke. He was survived by his widow Dr Judith Kellermann and their children Tobias and Alice.
