= Plas Bodewryd =

Grade II* listed privately owned country house in Bodewryd, Anglesey

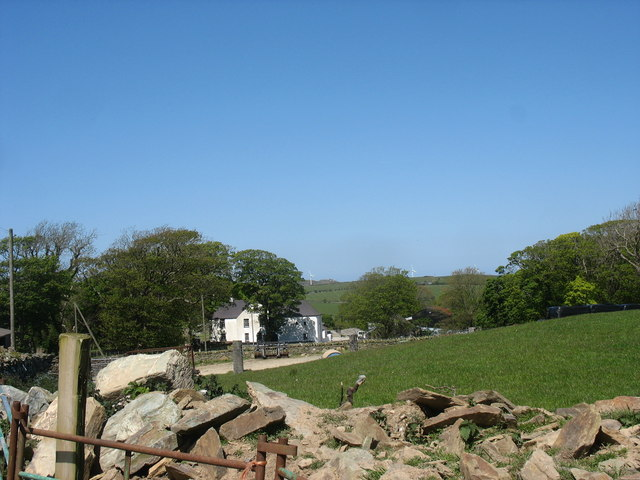
- Plas Bodewryd

General information
- Type: Private Residence
- Location: Bodewryd, United Kingdom
- Coordinates: 53.3899°N 4.4073°W

Design and construction
- Designations

Listed Building – Grade II*
- Official name: Plas Bodewryd
- Designated: 2 September 1952
- Reference no.: 5334

Plas Bodewryd is a Grade II* listed privately owned country house in Bodewryd, Anglesey, which was owned by the Wynne family until 1755 then the Lords Stanley of Alderley until the 20th century.

== History ==
The house was the residence of the prominent Wynne family. Gweirydd ap Rhys Goch of Henllys may have been an ancestor of the Wynn(e) family of Bodewryd. Margaret Wynne (d.1723) passed the estate to her son, the agriculturalist and lawyer Dr Edward Wynne (1681–1755) who was Chancellor of Hereford. On his death, the estate passed to his sister's granddaughter, Margaret Owen, heiress of the Penrhos estate, Anglesey, who married Sir John Thomas Stanley, 6th Baronet. Their son was John, 1st Lord Stanley of Alderley in whose family the estate remains for some decades. The present owners are the Tudor family who purchased the property in the 1950s.

== Architecture ==
The present house comprises a central block dating from the late 15th or early 16th century with a south wing added or rebuilt in the early 17th century. The central block was extended in the late 17th century and further wings added in the early 18th and late 19th centuries, giving the house a predominantly 18th century style.
