= John Fraser (Celticist) =

- Born: 1882; Inverness, Scotland
- Died: 18 May 1945 (aged 62–63)
- Title: Jesus Professor of Celtic

Academic background
- Education: University of Aberdeen; Trinity College, Cambridge; University of Jena

Academic work
- Discipline: Celtic languages
- Institutions: University of Oxford
- Main interests: Scottish Gaelic and Scottish place name studies

John Fraser (1882 – 18 May 1945) was Jesus Professor of Celtic at the University of Oxford.

== Life ==
He was born in Inverness, Scotland, and studied at the University of Aberdeen, Trinity College, Cambridge and the University of Jena. After lecturing in Celtic at Aberdeen University, he was appointed Jesus Professor of Celtic in 1921, becoming thereby a Professorial Fellow of Jesus College, Oxford. He held the position until his death in 1945.

He had a particular research interest in Scottish Gaelic and Scottish place name studies, but left no substantial work beyond his many contributions to learned periodicals. His papers are now held by Aberdeen University.
