= Neil Rhind =

English journalist and writer (1937–2024)

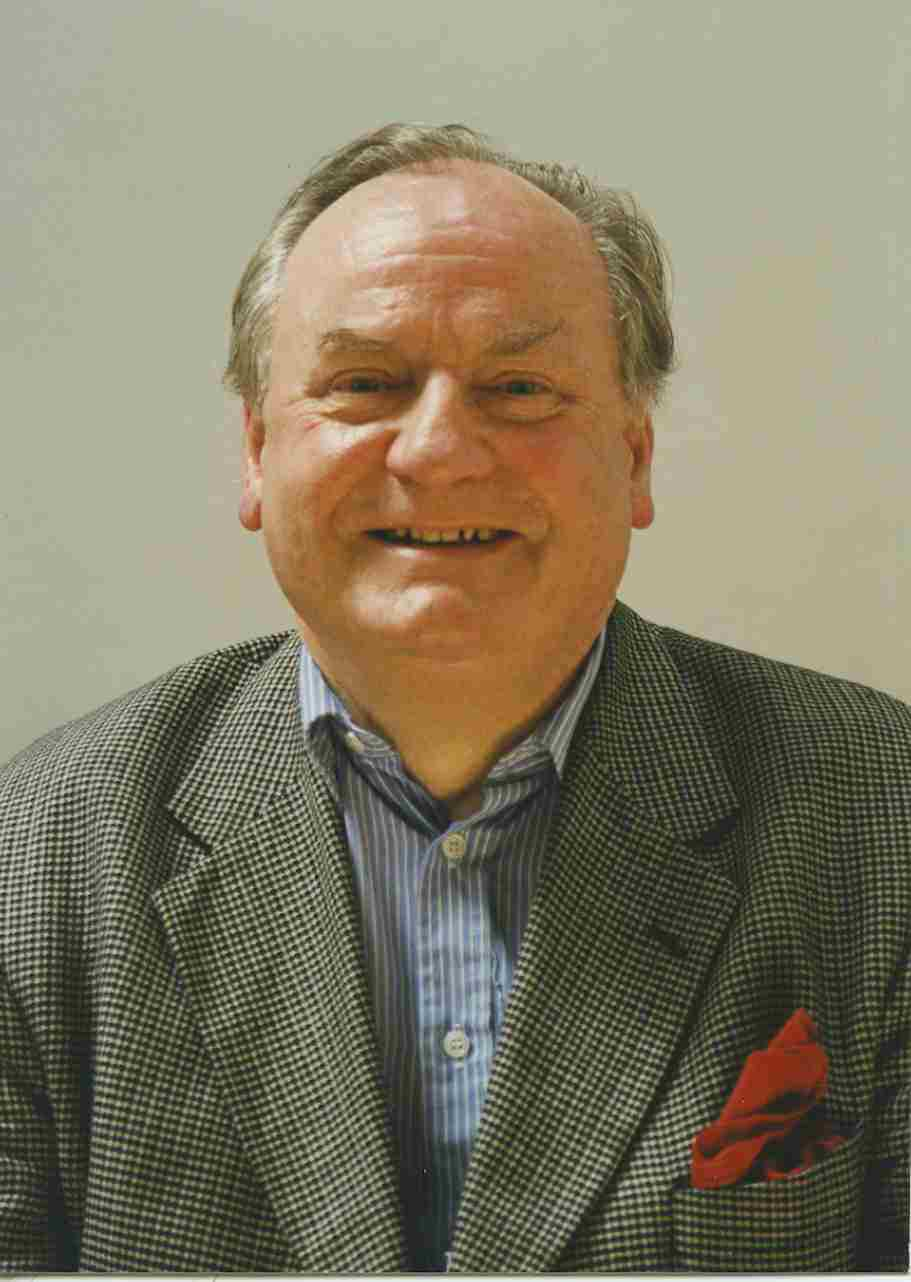
Neil Rhind

Neil Biron Rhind MBE (9 January 1937 – 10 February 2024) was an English journalist, writer and an authority on the social and historical development of Blackheath and surrounding areas of south-east London.

== Early life ==
Rhind was born and has lived most of his life in Blackheath, London. He is the youngest of four siblings born to Doris Pamela and William Alexander, a naval officer. During World War II, Rhind was evacuated and separated from his siblings for a time. He returned to Blackheath in 1951. Rhind was educated at St Marylebone Grammar School. He married Elizabeth on 3 September 1960, had two children, and lived in The Lane in Blackheath's Cator Estate.

== Journalism career ==
From 1957 to 1959, Rhind served in RAF air traffic control, mainly at Uxbridge. He worked briefly as a librarian before joining the Odham Newnes Press where he worked as the Packaging Review Yearbook editor. From 1963 he was assistant editor and then managing editor of the Good Food Guide.

In 1967 he became a freelance writer working as a press officer for The Consumers' Association and press officer of the Greenwich Theatre, during and following its rebuilding and reopening. In 1969 he became press officer of the Blackheath Society.

From 1969, prompted by fierce local opposition to the Greater London Development Plan (London Ringways) and its adverse effect on Blackheath, Rhind became involved in documenting and protecting the social and architectural history of his home district, Blackheath and Greenwich.

== Work on Blackheath ==
In 1971 Rhind joined the Greenwich and Lewisham Antiquarian Society (renamed the Greenwich Historical Society in 1991) and was elected to its council in 1973. He succeeded Sir Leslie Monson as president in 1982, in turn being succeeded by Sir Robert Somerville in 1984. He gave two presidential addresses - The Cator Estate and Blackheath: Some Sporting Myths, and Thoughts on Jack the Ripper, the Blackheath Connection, later becoming a vice-president.

Rhind joined the Blackheath Society committee in 1974, succeeded Ken Bound as chairman in September 1993, resigning in May 1998. He collated an archive collection of over 15,000 images of Blackheath which were being digitised and made available online. In 2016 he was appointed president of the Society.

Rhind was a long-standing member of the Lewisham Local History Council (an advisory group set up by Lewisham Council), and a member of the Greenwich Industrial History Society and Lewisham Local History Society. He was chairman of the Blackheath Schools of Art and Music Trust and founder of the Friends of Ranger's House. He was an honorary life member of the Westcombe Society and a past chairman of the London Borough of Lewisham Conservation Advisory Committee.

Rhind was a leading contributor to the Blackheath Conservation Area Appraisal submitted to Lewisham Council in 2007.

=== Blackheath Preservation Trust ===
Rhind was director and secretary of the Blackheath Preservation Trust from October 1972 to May 2001. The Trust was set up in 1938 to combat the demolition and destruction of buildings of architectural and historic merit. As secretary, Rhind was involved in work relating to the Blackheath Art Club, Blackheath railway station/Chapman House, Brigade House, Brooklands House, The Cedars, Eagle House in Lewisham, Martin House, Park Hall, Poplar Cottage, Vanbrugh Castle, the Westcombe Woodlands, and Blackheath Halls (in 1977, the BPT bought the property, then threatened with demolition by developers; the BPT retained the freehold until it was acquired by Trinity Laban Conservatoire of Music and Dance). His interest in the preservation trust movement led to a time as an advisor to the Vivat Trust.

=== 2012 Olympics ===
Rhind was a supporter of NOGOE (No to Greenwich Olympic Equestrian Events) which organised ultimately unsuccessful opposition to the use of an area of Blackheath just outside the Greenwich Park gates, known as Circus Field, for Olympic equestrian events. Campaigners claimed that it would be unlawful for the London Borough of Greenwich to give planning permission for London 2012 to use the land because the enclosure of any part of the Heath, including Circus Field, would be contrary to the Metropolitan Commons Act 1866, which established the concept of metropolitan commons being available at all times for the benefit of members of the public. A NOGOE petition gathered over 12,000 signatures, but the argument was rejected by Greenwich.

== Writing ==
Rhind wrote several books, starting in 1968 with The Consumer Wakes Up, and Make Me Understand Pregnancy and Childbirth and The Greenwich Theatre Book in 1969.

His output then mainly focused on subjects related to Blackheath, including four volumes on Blackheath Village and Environs. Drawing on his research and writing, Rhind led numerous walks in the Blackheath area describing buildings of architectural or historical interest, and gave many talks on local history.

== Honours ==
Rhind was awarded an MBE in the 1999 New Year Honours for services to the preservation of the historical character of Blackheath. He was elected a Fellow of the Society of Antiquaries of London in June 2005 and, in January 2011, appointed an Honorary Fellow of the University of London, Goldsmiths College for his work in the conservation and historic research of south-east London. On 17 May 2017, he was awarded the Freedom of the Royal Borough of Greenwich.

== Death ==
Rhind died on 10 February 2024, aged 87.
