= Derec Llwyd Morgan =

Welsh academic and university vice-chancellor

Derec Llwyd Morgan (born as Derek Lloyd Morgan; 15 November 1943) is a Welsh academic who is a former Vice-Chancellor of the University of Wales, Aberystwyth.

== Biography ==
Morgan was educated at Amman Valley Grammar School, (now Ysgol Dyffryn Aman) Carmarthenshire, Wales before studying at the University College of North Wales, Bangor, for a Bachelor of Arts degree. He obtained his doctorate with a thesis entitled A critical study of the works of Charles Edwards (1628-1691?) from Jesus College, Oxford.

He was a lecturer at the University College of Wales, Aberystwyth from 1969 before moving back to the Department of Welsh at Bangor in 1975, rising to become Reader (1983–1989). He was also Director of the Research Centre Wales from 1985 to 1989. In 1989, Morgan was appointed Professor of Welsh at Aberystwyth, also serving as Vice-Principal in 1994–1995. He was then Vice-Chancellor and Principal from 1995 until 2004, when he became Professor Emeritus. As Vice-Chancellor, he was an ex officio Welsh Supernumerary Fellow of Jesus College, Oxford in 1997–1998 and 2003–2004.

He was made an Honorary Fellow of Bangor in 1996 and of Jesus College, Oxford in 1999. He was awarded a DLitt by the University of Wales in 1999 and an honorary DUniv in 2006. He has also served on the Broadcasting Council for Wales, Independent Television Commission, the Court and Council of the National Library of Wales, the Council of the National Eisteddfod of Wales and the Sir Kyffin Williams Trust. He is also a Founding Fellow of the Learned Society of Wales and is a Member of its inaugural Council.

Academic offices
Preceded by Kenneth O. Morgan	Vice-Chancellor of the University of Wales Aberystwyth; 1994–2004	Succeeded by Noel Lloyd
