= William Wynne (lawyer) =

Welsh lawyer and author

William Wynne (baptised 1692 – 16 May 1765) was a Welsh lawyer and writer.

== Life ==
Wynne, the youngest son of the Welsh civil servant Owen Wynne, was baptised at St. Margaret's, Westminster in 1692. His father, who served as secretary to Sir Leoline Jenkins and succeeding Secretaries of State, died in 1700. William Wynne was educated at Jesus College, Oxford, matriculating in 1709, obtaining his BA degree in 1712 and his MA in 1723. He became a member of Middle Temple in 1712 and was called to the bar in 1718. He was assisted in his legal career by family ecclesiastical connections – John Wynne, Bishop of St Asaph from 1715 onwards, was a relative, and his father-in-law was a trusted adviser to successive Bishops of Hereford. Wynne was one of the lawyers who represented Francis Atterbury, Bishop of Rochester, in his trial in 1723 on charges of high treason. He also advised Edmund Gibson, Bishop of London in the 1740s, on legal matters concerning the marriage of Gibson's daughter. Wynne was made a serjeant-at-law in 1736.

Wynne's writings included Observations Touching the Dignity and Antiquity of the Degree of Serjeant at Law (1756) (written at a time when the position of the serjeants in the Court of Common Pleas was under threat), and The Life of Sir Leoline Jenkins (1724), using papers inherited from his father. He died on 16 May 1765 and was buried in Westminster Abbey seven days later. One of his sons was the lawyer Edward Wynne.
