= David Poole (judge) =

Sir David Anthony Poole (8 June 1938 – 18 June 2006) was an English barrister and High Court judge. He is perhaps best known for representing Eric Cantona on charges of a "flying kick" assault of an opposition spectator in 1995.

== Life and career ==
Poole was educated at Ampleforth College, and read Classics at Jesus College, Oxford, from 1957 to 1962, being elected JCR President in 1960. He was made an honorary Fellow of the College in 1997. After a postgraduate diploma in science at UMIST, he worked in industry for some years before changing to a legal career. He was called to the Bar by Middle Temple in 1968, where he became a bencher in 1992. He played rugby for Oxford University (though missing out on a Blue), London Irish, the Bar and the Northern Circuit.

As a barrister, he took on a mix of criminal and civil cases. He was appointed a Queen's Counsel in 1984, after which he concentrated mostly on criminal work, mainly for the prosecution. As a lawyer for the defence, his scientific background enabled him to be at the forefront of early challenges to DNA evidence.

In March 1995, Poole was instructed to represent by Manchester United star footballer Eric Cantona when Cantona was charged with assault on an opposition supporter. Playing against Crystal Palace at Selhurst Park in a Premier League match, Cantona was taunted by a spectator, Matthew Simmons. Enraged, Cantona launched a flying kick at Simmons. Brought before Croydon Magistrates' Court, Cantona was sentenced to two weeks' imprisonment, but then given bail pending an appeal and finally served 120 hours of community service.

Poole was a Crown Court Recorder from 1982 until 1995, when he was appointed as a High Court judge in the Queen's Bench Division and received the customary knighthood. He presided over several notorious trials, including that of the paedophile Sidney Cooke in 1999, and the murderer John Paul Allan in 2003.

As a result of adverse press coverage, he halted the first trial of Leeds United players Lee Bowyer and Jonathan Woodgate, and two friends, on 11 April 2001. The defendants were charged with affray and grievous bodily harm after an Asian student, Safraz Najeib, was assaulted in Leeds city centre. Poole held that an article in the Sunday Mirror created a "substantial risk" of prejudice to the trial; its editor, Colin Myler, resigned three days later.

At a retrial later that year, Woodgate was convicted and sentenced to community service, but Bowyer was acquitted. Poole never retired, continuing to work until shortly before his death in June 2006.

== Affiliations ==
Poole chaired the Association of Lawyers for the Defence of the Unborn from 1985 to 1991. He became a bencher of Middle Temple in 1992 and was made an honorary Fellow of Jesus College, Oxford, in 1997.

== Death ==
Poole died in 2006, aged 68, of undisclosed causes, survived by his wife, the former Pauline O'Flaherty, and their four sons William, Alex, Gareth and Simon.
