= St Marylebone Grammar School =

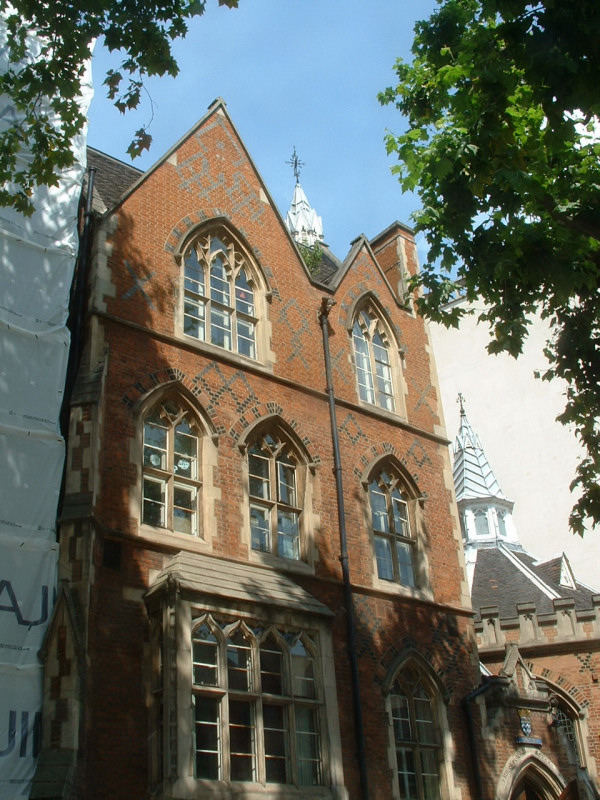
- The original building, in August 2011
- City of Westminster, London; United Kingdom

Information
- Motto: ex animo tamquam Deo
- Established: 1792
- Closed: 1981

St Marylebone Grammar School (SMGS) was a grammar school located in the London borough of the City of Westminster. It was open from 1792 to 1981.

== History ==
=== Philological School ===
Founded as the Philological Society by Thomas Collingwood, under the patronage of the Prince Frederick, Duke of York and Albany, its object was to help "the heads of families, who by unexpected misfortune, have been reduced from a station of comfort and respectability." Founded in Mary Street (later renamed Stanhope Street), NW1, it moved to Marylebone Road in 1827. Its fortunes improved largely due to Edwin Abbott, headmaster from 1827 to 1872. After Abbott, the school's financial position deteriorated.

=== Grammar school ===
In 1901 it was accepted in trust by the London County Council and renamed St Marylebone Grammar School. After World War II it recovered. Under headmaster Philip Wayne it developed artistic activities, acquired shared use of playing fields in Sudbury Hill, and established a country base in the village of Forest Green, near Leith Hill. In 1957 the motto "ex animo tamquam Deo" ("from the heart, as from God") was added to the school's crest at the suggestion of the deputy headmaster Kenneth Crook.

After Philip Wayne, SMGS was led by Harry Llewellyn-Smith as headmaster until 1970. During his period a new and separate science block was built a short walk away from the school's main site. Roy Mansell led the science team and was for a short period, following Patrick Hutton's tenure, the final headmaster.

=== Closure ===
Soon after headmaster Patrick Hutton (formerly head of English at St Paul's School) arrived in 1970, the Inner London Education Authority (ILEA) proposed to merge SMGS with the local secondary modern school, Rutherford School, later part of North Westminster School. ILEA itself came into conflict with the new Conservative government, whose secretary of state for education Margaret Thatcher took an interest in SMGS. By 1981, however, SMGS had closed.

== Current use of buildings ==
The former science block continued in educational use as the Cosway Street Centre, part of City of Westminster College, but was later demolished. The main school building consisted of the original school building on Marylebone Road and two later wings in Lisson Grove; the Lisson Grove buildings were demolished and replaced with an office block. The original building is Grade II listed and remains intact. From 2002 to 2024 it was part of Abercorn School.

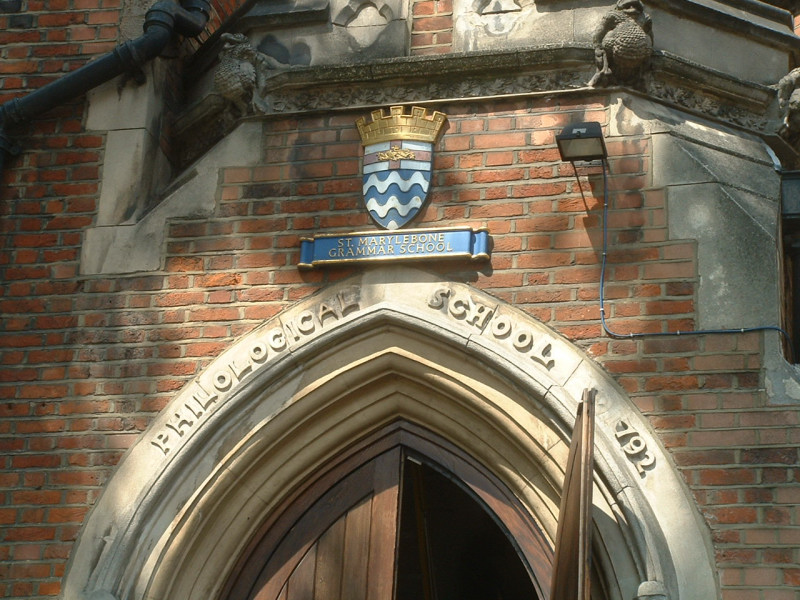
LCC plaque with the school name; the original name and date of the school is incorporated into the arch below the plaque.

Former pupils of the school are known as Old Philologians.

- Adam Ant (Stuart Goddard), pop singer
- John Barnes, footballer
- Steve Barron, film director
- Simon Reich, professor in the Division of Global Affairs at Rutgers University - Newark in Newark, New Jersey
- Charles Bateman, architect
- Peter Batkin, art expert
- Marshal of the Royal Air Force Sir Michael Beetham, a former Chief of the Air Staff of the RAF
- Barry Blue (Barry Green), pop singer and writer
- Anastasios Christodoulou, secretary general of the Association of Commonwealth Universities from 1980 to 1996
- Len Deighton, author
- William Floyd, head of the Department of Ergonomics and Cybernetics at Loughborough University from 1960 to 1975
- Benny Green, musician
- Geoffrey Stern, writer, broadcaster, composer and expert on International Communism
- Victor Gauntlett, petrochemical entrepreneur and car enthusiast
- Sir Leicester Harmsworth, 1st Baronet, Liberal MP for Caithness from 1900 to 1918 and Caithness and Sutherland from 1918 to 1922
- Robin Harper, Member of the Scottish Parliament for the Lothians (1999–2011), first member of the Green Party to be elected to a parliament in the UK
- Michael Henley, Bishop of St Andrews, Dunkeld and Dunblane from 1995 to 2004
- Sir Charles Solomon Henry, 1st Baronet, Liberal MP for Wellington (Shropshire) from 1906 to 1918 and the Wrekin from 1918 to 1919
- Eric Hobsbawm, historian and author
- Anthony A. Hyman, molecular cell biologist and director of the Max Planck Institute for Molecular Cell Biology and Genetics
- Jerome K. Jerome, Edwardian author
- Martyn Lloyd-Jones, Welsh preacher
- Sir Vincent Lloyd-Jones, judge
- Andrew Loog Oldham, producer and manager of the Rolling Stones
- Francis Paget, Bishop of Oxford from 1901 to 1911
- Sir Michael Pepper, Pender Professor of Nanoelectronics at UCL since 2009
- John Price, cricketer
- Neil Rhind, writer and historian
- Sir Landon Ronald, conductor
- Irving Scholar, chairman, Tottenham Hotspur Football Club (1980s)
- E. H. Sothern, Shakespearean American Actor
- John Staddon, professor, psychobiologist, Duke University
- Sir Cyril Taylor, social entrepreneur
- Julien Temple, film director
- Sir Brian Vickers, professor of English literature from 1975 to 2003 at ETH Zurich
- Glenn White, professor of astronomy at The Open University
- Stuart Woolf, historian at the University of Essex
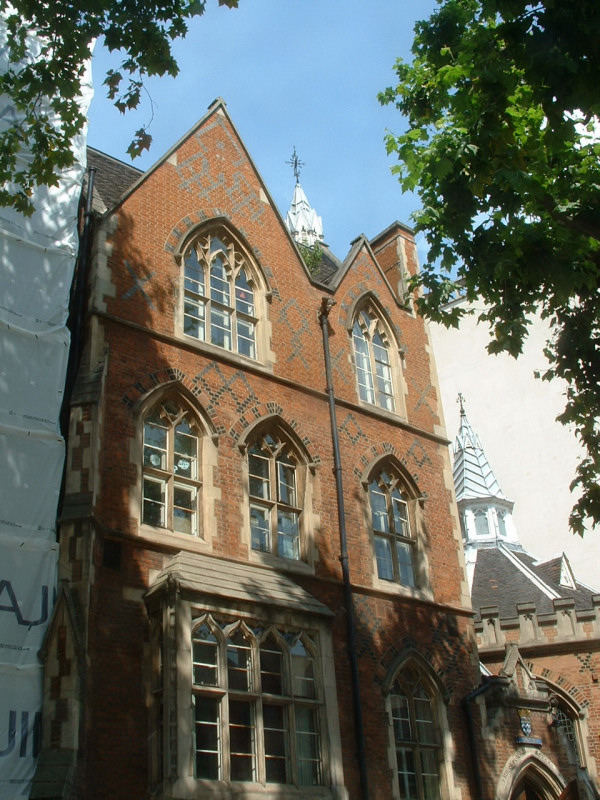
Marylebone Grammar School's original building, August 2011. At this time the adjoining office building was being rebuilt and was covered in scaffolding and plastic sheeting.

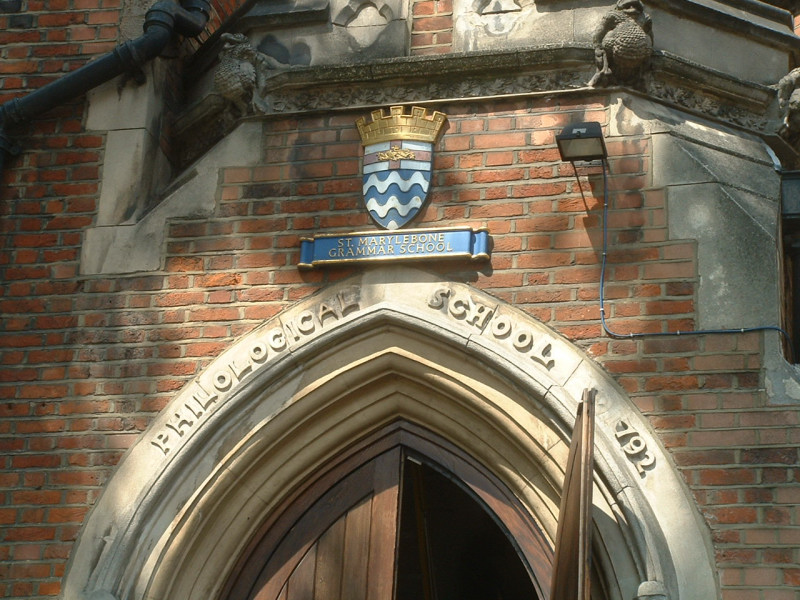
Plaque above the main entrance to the old Marylebone Grammar School building. The school's former name and date is shown on the archway, The Philological School 1792
