= Jesus Professor of Celtic =

Academic position at the University of Oxford

The Jesus Chair of Celtic is a professorship in Celtic studies at the University of Oxford within the Faculty of Medieval and Modern Languages. The holder is also a Professorial Fellow of Jesus College, Oxford. Just six people have held the chair since it was established in 1876, the first of whom was Sir John Rhys. The previous post-holder, Thomas Charles-Edwards, retired in 2011. An appeal to ensure the continuation of the chair successfully raised £3.25 million by the end of 2018, and in 2020 the post was taken up by its current incumbent David Willis.

== History ==
The reforms at Oxford University during the mid-19th century provided the impetus for the establishment of a chair in Celtic, with a major impetus provided by Matthew Arnold's Poetry lectures 'On the Study of Celtic Literature'. At the time that the Royal Commission was established in 1852, there were 19 fellowships and 18 scholarships at Jesus College. Seven of each were limited to those from north Wales, and seven of each to south Wales and Monmouthshire. There were also exhibitions for students from Wales, with the Meyricke bequest making the north Wales exhibitions particularly valuable, despite the lower numbers of residents in north Wales compared to south Wales. The restrictions were said to be "ruining the College as a place of education", since it took little effort for a Welsh boy to achieve a scholarship or exhibition despite the deficiencies in their education; and many then became fellows of the college without obtaining anything more than a third- or fourth-class degree. The commissioners appointed in 1852 to consider reforms of the university were known to favour abolishing local restrictions on fellowships and scholarships, such as those requiring the holder to be from a particular school or area. The college therefore proposed to the commissioners in 1854 that the divisions between north and south Wales fellowships and scholarships should be removed, and that the number of fellows should be reduced by two in order to endow a Professorship of Welsh.

The commissioners, however, proposed that a fellowship should be devoted to the Laudian Professor of Arabic. The college objected, on the basis that a Celtic Professorship was more appropriate for the college given its Welsh connections, and the commissioners conceded some ground, allowing the fellowship to be applied to such purposes as might be decided upon later. The college's proposal was later adopted, with the first Jesus Professor of Celtic, the distinguished Welsh scholar Sir John Rhys, being elected in 1876.

It is the oldest chair in the Faculty of Medieval and Modern Languages, University of Oxford and is still the only chair in Celtic at an English university.

The professor also controls access to the Celtic Library at Jesus College, a specialist collection for researchers.

== List of Jesus Professors of Celtic ==
- Sir John Rhys : 1877–1915
- John Fraser : 1921–1945
- Sir Idris Foster : 1947–1978
- D Ellis Evans : 1978–1996
- Thomas Charles-Edwards : 1997–2011
- David Willis : 2020–

== See also ==
- List of professorships at the University of Oxford
- Chair of Celtic, Glasgow
