= Hugh Williams (of Chester) =

Welsh Whig politician

Hugh Williams (c.1694 – January 1742), of Chester, was a Welsh Whig politician who sat in the House of Commons from 1725 to 1734.

== Early life ==
Williams was the eldest son of John Williams, of Chester and Glascoed, and his wife Catherine Owen, daughter of Sir Hugh Owen, 2nd Baronet MP, of Orielton, Pembrokeshire. He was grandson of Sir William Williams, 1st Baronet. He matriculated at Jesus College, Oxford on 3 June 1712, entered Gray's Inn on 10 February 1713, and was called to the bar in 1718.

== Marriage and family ==
He married firstly Ursula Bridgeman, daughter of Sir John Bridgeman, 3rd Baronet, and secondly Susannah Norris, daughter of Edward Norris, but had no children by either. He succeeded to his father's estates of Bridge House, Chester, Bodelwyddan, Flints. and Nantanog, Anglesey.

== Political career ==
Williams first contested Chester as a Whig at the 1722 general election, but was unsuccessful. He was elected Member of Parliament for Anglesey at a by-election on 10 April 1725, on the Bulkeley interest, and was elected again at the general election of 1727, defeating Thomas Lloyd, of Llanidan each time. He voted with the Government on every recorded occasion and spoke on several motions between 1732 and 1734. He voted for the Excise Bill in 1733 which made him so unpopular at Anglesey that without Bulkeley support at the 1734 general election, he withdrew before the poll and stood unsuccessfully again at Chester.

== Death ==
Williams died without issue on 14 January 1742. His widow remarried to Hugh Warburton of Winnington Hall.

Parliament of Great Britain
Preceded by The Viscount Bulkeley	Member of Parliament for Anglesey; 1725–1734	Succeeded by Nicholas Bayly
