= Owen Wynne (civil servant) =

Welsh civil servant and lawyer

Owen Wynne (1652–1700) was a lawyer and civil servant in the seventeenth century.

== Life ==
Wynne, born in 1652, was from Llechylched, Anglesey, north Wales and was part of a family that claimed descent from Hwfa ap Cynddelw, lord of Llifon in the twelfth century. Wynne was educated at Jesus College, Oxford, matriculating in 1668 and obtaining his Bachelor of Arts degree in 1672. He later obtained a doctorate in law and seems to have become a member of Doctors' Commons in 1694. When the Welsh lawyer and academic Sir Leoline Jenkins – who had been the Principal of Jesus College during Wynne's time in Oxford – became Secretary of State for the Northern Department in 1680 (and later Secretary of State for the Southern Department), Wynne became his confidential secretary. Wynne continued as undersecretary to the succeeding Secretaries of State until about 1690, and was secretary to the commissioners that King James II sent to William of Orange in 1688. He has been described by one historian as "an early example of the permanent civil servant." He was warden of the Mint until 1690 and, in 1693 was secretary to the commissioners for prizes. He was the father of the lawyer and author William Wynne, who wrote The Life of Sir Leoline Jenkins using papers inherited from his father. Owen Wynne died in 1700.
