= Frederick Atkinson =

Sir Frederick John Atkinson, KCB (7 December 1919 – 10 June 2018) was a British civil servant.

Atkinson was educated at Dulwich College and Jesus College, Oxford. He lectured at Jesus and Trinity Colleges before joining the Economic Section of the Cabinet Office in 1949. He spent 1952 to 1954 at the British Embassy in Washington D.C. before returning to work in HM Treasury. He was the Chief Economic Adviser to the Department of Trade and Industry from 1970 to 1973, an Assistant Secretary-General at the Organisation for Economic Co-operation and Development from 1973 to 1975, Deputy Secretary and Chief Economic Adviser at the Department of Energy from 1975 to 1977, before his final posting, as Chief Economic Adviser to HM Treasury and Head of the Government Economic Service from 1977 to 1979. He was awarded the CB in 1971 and knighted on his advancement to KCB in 1979. He was appointed an Honorary Fellow of Jesus College, Oxford in 1979.
