= Idris Foster =

Welsh scholar (1911–1984)

- Born: 23 July 1911; Carneddi, Bethesda, Caernarfonshire, Wales
- Died: 18 June 1984 (aged 72)
- Title: Jesus Professor of Celtic

Academic background
- Education: University College of North Wales

Academic work
- Discipline: Celtic languages
- Institutions: University of Oxford
- Main interests: Medieval Welsh and Irish

Sir Idris Llewelyn Foster (23 July 1911 – 18 June 1984) was a Welsh scholar and Jesus Professor of Celtic at the University of Oxford from 1947 until 1978.

He was born in Carneddi, Bethesda, Caernarfonshire, Wales, and studied Latin and Welsh at the University College of North Wales, Bangor. He was appointed Head of the Department of Celtic at the University of Liverpool in 1936. His academic career was interrupted by World War II, when he worked in Naval Intelligence, contributing to the Geographical Handbook Series. He was appointed as the third holder of the Oxford chair in Celtic (originally held by Sir John Rhys) in 1947 and became a Fellow of Jesus College, Oxford at the same time. He was knighted in 1977 and retired the following year back to his birthplace, where he died in 1984.

His work in the field of Celtic Studies was in Medieval Welsh and Irish, both poetry and prose. He made a particular contribution to the study of tale of Culhwch ac Olwen, and his edition of the tale was published in 1992, after his death, by the assistance of his friends Rachel Bromwich and D. Simon Evans.

He was involved in many Welsh organisations and societies, particularly the National Eisteddfod, where he was Chairman of the Council and President of the Court, the National Library of Wales (Treasurer and Vice-President), and the Church in Wales (member of the Governing Body). The National Library of Wales holds the archive of his papers.
