= Edward Wynne (jurist) =

Edward Wynne (baptised 25 February 1734 – 27 December 1784) was an English lawyer and scholar.

== Life ==
Wynne was the son of William Wynne, sergeant-at-law, and was baptised at St Clement Danes, London on 25 February 1734. He was admitted as a member of the Middle Temple in 1749 (being called to the bar in 1758). He matriculated at Jesus College, Oxford in 1753, but left the college without taking a degree. His wealth meant that he did not need to work actively as a lawyer. On his father's death in 1765, he inherited the estate of Little Chelsea in Kensington, London; he also owned the manor of Polsew at St Erme, near Truro in Cornwall. On his mother's death in 1779, he inherited property in Somerset. He owned a house in Essex Street, London, as well as property in Dudley and Wales. His inheritance also included his father's library, which contained the collections of Narcissus Luttrell. Wynne had a library of almost 2,800 volumes, including many books on English law and Roman law. In 1765, he published A Miscellany Containing Several Law Tracts, which included some of Wynne's own works and one of his father's works (Observations Touching the Antiquity and Dignity of the Degree of Serjeant at Law). His most important work was Eunomus, or, Dialogues Concerning the Law and Constitution of England (1768), an attempt to explain English legal principles and defend it against charges that it was only interesting to lawyers. It also attempt to refute criticism of cost and delay in the legal process. It reached its fifth edition in 1822, although it was overshadowed by William Blackstone's Commentaries on the Laws of England.

Wynne, who never married, died of cancer of the mouth, at his house in Little Chelsea, London, on 27 December 1784. He was buried in Westminster Abbey, in the same grave as his parents. His property was divided between his sister and his brother, who was a Fellow of All Souls College, Oxford. His library was auctioned after his death in a sale that lasted eleven days.
