= Ellis Evans =

Welsh academic (1930–2013)

D. Ellis Evans FBA
- Born: 23 September 1930; Carmarthenshire, Wales
- Died: 26 September 2013 (aged 83)
- Title: Jesus Professor of Celtic (1978–1996)

Academic background
- Education: Jesus College, Oxford

Academic work
- Discipline: Celtic studies
- Institutions: University of Wales, Swansea; Jesus College, Oxford; Faculty of Medieval and Modern Languages, University of Oxford

David Ellis Evans FBA (23 September 1930 – 26 September 2013) was a Welsh scholar and academic. Having lectured at the University of Wales, Swansea, he returned to his alma mater the University of Oxford, serving as Jesus Professor of Celtic from 1978 until he retired in 1996.

== Early life and education ==
Evans was born on 23 September 1930 in Llanfynydd, Carmarthenshire, Wales. He was educated at Llandeilo Grammar School. After studying at Jesus College, Oxford and he received a doctorate from the University of Oxford.

== Academic career ==
Evans lectured at the University of Wales, Swansea from 1957 to 1978, rising to become a professor. In 1978, he returned to Oxford University as Jesus Professor of Celtic and also became a Professorial Fellow of Jesus College. He was appointed as a Fellow of the British Academy in 1983, having delivered the Academy's Sir John Rhys Memorial Lecture in 1977, named in honour of the first Oxford Celtic Professor. He retired in 1996.

His particular research interest was early Celtic culture throughout Europe, dealing with its relationship with that of the classical world, and in the history of the Insular Celtic languages, including the early literatures of Wales and Ireland. A volume of essays on these topics by fellow Celticists was published in 1995 in honour of his 65th birthday; Essays in honour of Professor D. Ellis Evans on the occasion of his sixty-fifth birthday.

== Selected works ==
- Evans, D. Ellis (1967). Gaulish personal names: a study of some Continental Celtic formations. Oxford: Oxford University Press. ISBN 978-0198119302.
