= Vincent Lloyd-Jones =

British judge

Sir Harry Vincent Lloyd-Jones (16 October 1901 – 23 September 1986) was a Welsh barrister who later became a judge of the High Court.

== Life ==
Lloyd-Jones was educated at St Marylebone Grammar School, University College, London and Jesus College, Oxford. At Oxford, he was an exhibitioner and obtained B.A. degrees in English (1923) and also in Jurisprudence (1924). Whilst at Oxford, he was President of the Oxford Union Society in the summer term of 1925. He was called to the bar by Inner Temple in 1926 and practised as a barrister on the Wales and Chester Circuit. He was appointed a King’s Counsel in 1949. He also held the positions of Recorder of Chester (1952–58) and of Cardiff (1958–60).

Lloyd-Jones was appointed a High Court Judge, assigned to the Probate, Divorce and Admiralty Division on 11 January 1960. He received the customary knighthood on his appointment. He was appointed to honorary fellowships of Jesus College (1960) and University College London (1962). He retired in 1972, and died in 1986.

Vincent Lloyd-Jones was the brother of the notable evangelical preacher Martyn Lloyd-Jones.
