= Goronwy Daniel =

Welsh academic and civil servant

Sir Goronwy Hopkin Daniel KCVO (21 March 1914 – 17 January 2003) was a Welsh academic and civil servant.

Born at Ystradgynlais, Brecknockshire, Wales, Daniel was educated at Pontardawe Grammar School, Amman Valley County School and University of Wales, Aberystwyth, where he gained a first-class degree. He obtained a D.Phil. from Jesus College, Oxford. In 1940 he married Valerie, daughter of Richard Lloyd George. They had one son and two daughters.

He joined the civil service in 1943, rising to Chief Statistician in the Ministry of Fuel and Power and eventually to Permanent Under-Secretary at the Welsh Office when it was set up in 1964.

In 1969 he returned to Aberystwyth to become Principal of the University College of Wales, and was knighted the same year. He held the post for ten years. In 1977 he was appointed a Lieutenant of Dyfed. In 1982 he was appointed Chairman of the Welsh Fourth Channel Authority, having been one of the prime movers in its creation.

== Offices held ==
Academic offices
Preceded by Sir Thomas Parry	Principal of the University College of Wales Aberystwyth; 1969–1979	Succeeded by Gareth Owen
