= Edward Wynne (chancellor) =

Welsh lawyer, landowner and Chancellor of Hereford (1681–1755)

The Worshipful Edward Wynne

Chancellor of the Diocese Hereford
- In office 1707–1755

Personal details
- Born: 1681 Llantrisant, Ynys Môn
- Died: 30 June 1755 (aged 73–74) Hereford, England
- Spouse: Anne Lloyd (d.1739)
- Education: Jesus College, Oxford: (BA; MA; BCL; DCL)
- Occupation: Lawyer; Landowner

Edward Wynne (1681 – 30 June 1755) of Plas Bodewryd, Bodewryd, Anglesey, was a Welsh lawyer and landowner, Fellow of Jesus College, Oxford, an advocate at Doctors' Commons, and Chancellor of the Diocese of Hereford (1707–55) who has been regarded as "undoubtedly, one of the chief men of Anglesey in the first half of the 18th century."

== Education ==
Wynne was part of the Wynn family from Plas Bodewryd, Anglesey. He was the younger son of Edward Wynn, who was rector of Llantrisant, Anglesey at the time of his son's birth in 1681, and his wife Margaret, who was the eldest daughter of Robert Morgan, Bishop of Bangor. Wynne's elder brother, John, died in infancy. Wynne was educated at Jesus College, Oxford, where he matriculated on 18 December 1698, aged 17. He obtained various degrees thereafter: Bachelor of Arts (1702), Master of Arts (1705), Bachelor of Civil Law and Doctor of Civil Law (both 1711). He was appointed to a Fellowship of the college in 1703, retaining this position until 1711.

== Career ==
Wynne's uncle, Humphrey Humphreys, became Bishop of Hereford in 1701, and Humphreys appointed him Chancellor of Hereford in 1707. Wynne became an advocate in Doctors' Commons in 1712, his career being helped by the fact that his mother lived on the family estate at Plas Bodewryd, Anglesey and managed matters there until her death in 1723.

Wynne held the position of Chancellor of the diocese for many years, only leaving office a year before his death in 1755. In 1748, he endowed an annual sermon to be preached on the birthday of Bishop Humphries (24 November). He was regarded as a devoted servant of the diocese, with an interest in its history and administration. He was also noted as being a progressive landowner, bringing advances in agricultural matters from Herefordshire to his estate on Anglesey. In particular, he was said to have been the first landowner on Anglesey to grow turnips, which he did in 1714. He has been described as "undoubtedly, one of the chief men of Anglesey in the first half of the 18th century." Wynne was a patron of the Anglesey-born poet and cleric Goronwy Owen in Owen's youth, and it is known that Owen transcribed some documents for Wynne in 1739, when Owen was 16.

== Family ==
Wynne married Anne Lloyd, heiress of John Lloyd from the Vale of Clwyd. However, none of their children survived infancy. They were estranged for some time, but reconciled before Anne's death on 29 July 1739. Wynne himself died on 30 June 1755, and was buried on 4 July 1755. As Wynne had no children of his own who could inherit, the family estate passed to his sister's granddaughter, Margaret Owen, who married Sir John Stanley, 6th Baronet, in 1763.
