= Robert D. Borsley =

British linguist

Robert D. Borsley (born 15 March 1949, in Coventry) is emeritus professor of linguistics at the University of Essex, UK.

He studied at the University College of North Wales (now the University of Wales, Bangor) and the University of Edinburgh, where he did his Ph.D. He worked at the Adam Mickiewicz University in Poznań, University College London, the IBM UK Scientific Centre in Winchester and University College Dublin, before becoming a lecturer in linguistics at the University of Wales, Bangor in 1986. He was awarded a Personal Chair in 1997. In 2000, he moved to the University of Essex, where he remained until his retirement in 2017.

His research is concerned with syntactic theory, and he has worked within a number of frameworks, particularly Head-Driven Phrase Structure Grammar and Principles and Parameters. He has worked on the syntax of English, Welsh, Breton and Polish.
