= Bibliography of Welsh history =

Published works on the history of Wales

This is a bibliography of published works on the history of Wales. It includes published books (by historians, antiquarians and translators), journals, and educational and academic history-related websites; it does not include self-published works, blogs or user-edited sites. Works may cover aspects of Welsh history inclusively or exclusively (see titles for guidance).

The list's primary purpose is to provide clearly-formatted sources for editors of articles on (or which contain elements of) Welsh history. Wikilinks to authors may provide further bibliographies. A Google Books link may be included, where search terms may yield individual page views or a free e-book.

== Mediaeval writers ==
- Anon: Chronicle of the Princes (Brut y Tywysogion) - see 1859
- Anon: Annales Cambriae - see 1888
- Bede - see online sources
- Gerald of Wales - see 1806 and 1868
- Gildas - see 1841

== 18th and 19th centuries ==
- Cambrian Register. Vol. 2. Williams, Strand, London. 1799. - downloadable PDF
- Giraldus de Barri (1806). The Itinerary of Archbishop Baldwin through Wales, AD 1188. Vol. 2. Translated by Hoare, Richard. London: William Miller.
- Fenton, Richard (1811). A historical tour through Pembrokeshire. Longman, Hurst, Rees, Orme & co.
- Jones, John (1824). The History of Wales. London: J Williams.
- Giles, John Allen (1841). The works of Gildas and Nennius from the Latin. London: James Bohn. - downloadable pdf
- Lewis, Samuel (1845). A topographical dictionary of Wales: Abbey to Llandyvrydog. Vol. 1 (3 ed.). Oxford University. - downloadable pdf
- Lewis, Samuel (1848). A topographical dictionary of Wales. Vol. 2. S. Lewis & Co.
- Archæologia Cambrensis: "Chronicle of the Princes". 3. Vol. X. 1859. - Translated from lost Latin text; in Welsh: Brut y Tywysogion
- Dimock, James F., ed. (1868). Giraldi Cambrensis opera. Volume 6: Itinerarium Kambriae et Descriptio Kambriae. London: Longman, Green, Reader, and Dyer.
- Williams (Ysgafell), Jane (1869). A History of Wales: Derived from Authentic Sources. London: Longmans, Green & Co. - re-published in 2010
- Wilson, John Marius (1872). Imperial Gazetteer of England and Wales. A. Fullarton & Co.
- Phillips, John Roland (1874). Memoirs of the Civil War in Wales and the Marches. Longmans, Green, & Co.
- Laws, Edward (1888). The History of Little England Beyond Wales. London: George Bell. - written from the perspective of Little England beyond Wales, i.e. Pembrokeshire and southwest Carmarthenshire, but includes wider areas
- Phillimore, Egerton (1888). "The Annales Cambriae and Old Welsh Genealogies, from Harleian MS. 3859". In Phillimore, Egerton (ed.). Y Cymmrodor. Vol. IX. Honourable Society of Cymmrodorion.
- Phillimore, Egerton (1892). "Note (a) to The Settlement of Brittany". In Phillimore, Egerton (ed.). Y Cymmrodor. Vol. XI. London: Honourable Society of Cymmrodorion.
- Meyer, Kuno (1896). "Early Relations Between Gael and Brython". In Evans, E. Vincent (ed.). Transactions of the Honourable Society of Cymmrodorion. Session 1895–1896. Vol. I. London: Honourable Society of Cymmrodorion.

== 20th century ==
- Baring-Gould, Sabine; Fisher, John (1911). The Lives of the British Saints. Vol. III. London: The Honourable Society of Cymmrodorion.
- Lloyd, John Edward (1912). A History of Wales from the Earliest Times to the Edwardian Conquest (2 ed.). Longmans, Green, and Co. "Lloyd history of Wales."
- An Inventory of the Ancient Monuments in Wales and Monmouthshire: County of Pembroke. Vol. VII. Royal Commission on the Ancient and Historical Monuments of Wales. 1925.
- Williams, Albert Hughes (1941). Prehistoric Times to 1063. An Introduction to the History of Wales. Vol. I. University of Wales Press.
- Reid, Alan (1973). The castles of Wales. G. Philip. ISBN 978-0-540-07052-7.
- Laing, Lloyd (1977). "Wales and the Isle of Man". The Archaeology of Late Celtic Britain and Ireland, c. 400–1200 AD. Frome: Book Club Associates / Methuen & Co. ISBN 978-0-416-65970-2.
- Morgan, Kenneth O. (1981). Rebirth of a nation: Wales 1880–1980. Oxford University Press, University of Wales Press. ISBN 978-0-19-821736-7.
- Williams, Gwyn A. (1985). When was Wales?: a history of the Welsh. Black Raven Press. ISBN 978-0-85159-003-5.
- Cunliffe, Barry (1987). Iron Age communities in Britain (2 ed.). Routledge & Kegan Paul. ISBN 978-1-134-27723-0.
- Davies, Rees R. (1987). Conquest, coexistence and change: Wales 1063–1415. Clarendon Press, University of Wales Press. doi:10.1093/acprof:oso/9780198208785.001.0001. ISBN 978-0-19-821732-9.
- Frere, Sheppard Sunderland (1987). "The End of Roman Britain". Britannia: A History of Roman Britain (3rd, revised ed.). London: Routledge & Kegan Paul. ISBN 978-0-7102-1215-3.
- Jenkins, Geraint Huw (1987). The foundations of modern Wales, 1642–1780. Clarendon Press, University of Wales Press. ISBN 978-0-19-821734-3.
- Williams, Glanmor (1987). Recovery, reorientation and reformation: Wales c.1415–1642. Clarendon Press, University of Wales Press. ISBN 978-0-19-821733-6.
- Jones, Barri; Mattingly, David (2007). "The Economy". An Atlas of Roman Britain. Cambridge: Blackwell Publishers. ISBN 978-1-84217-067-0.
- Laing, Lloyd; Laing, Jennifer (1990). "The non-Romanized zone of Britannia". Celtic Britain and Ireland, c. 200–800: The Myth of the Dark Ages. New York: St. Martin's Press. ISBN 978-0-312-04767-2.
- Walker, David (1990). Medieval Wales. Cambridge University Press. ISBN 978-0-521-31153-3.
- Maund, K. L. (1991). Ireland, Wales, and England in the Eleventh Century. Boydell & Brewer Ltd. ISBN 978-0-85115-533-3.
- Higham, Nicholas (1992). Rome, Britain and the Anglo-Saxons: Britain Without Rome. London: Routledge. ISBN 978-1-85264-022-4.
- Bartrum, Peter (1993). A Welsh Classical Dictionary. National Library of Wales. ISBN 978-0-7083-0561-4.
- Davies, John (1994). A History of Wales. Penguin History. ISBN 978-0-14-014581-6. - see also 2007 below
- Barrett, John C. (1994). Fragments from Antiquity: An Archaeology of Social Life in Britain, 2900-1200 BC. Oxford and Cambridge, Massachusetts: Blackwell. ISBN 978-0-631-18954-1.
- Lynch, Frances (1995). Gwynedd (A guide to ancient and historic Wales series). HM Stationery Office Books. ISBN 978-0-11-701574-6.
- Phillips, Mervyn (1997). Wales - Nation and Region. Gomer Press. ISBN 978-1-85-902423-2.

== 21st century ==
- Davies, R. R. (2000). The Age of Conquest: Wales, 1063–1415. Oxford: Oxford University Press. ISBN 978-0-19-820878-5.
- Lynch, Frances; Aldhouse-Green, Stephen; Davies, Jeffrey L. (2000). Prehistoric Wales. Sutton Publishing. ISBN 978-0-7509-2165-7.
- Pettifer, Adrian (August 2000). Welsh Castles: A Guide by Counties (1st ed.). Boydell & Brewer. ISBN 978-0-85115-778-8.
- Roberts, Michael; Clarke, Simone (2000). Women and Gender in Early Modern Wales. University of Wales Press. ISBN 978-0-7083-1550-7.
- Pollard, Joshua (2001). "Wales' Hidden History, Hunter-Gatherer Communities in Wales: The Neolithic". In Morgan, Prys; Aldhouse-Green, Stephen (eds.). History of Wales, 25,000 BC AD 2000. Stroud, Gloucestershire: Tempus Publishing. ISBN 978-0-7524-1983-1.
- Remfry, P. M. (2002). A Political Chronology of Wales, 1066 to 1282. SCS Publishing. ISBN 978-1-899376-46-9.
- Moore, David (2005). The Welsh wars of independence: c.410-c.1415 (2 ed.). Tempus. ISBN 978-0-7524-3321-9.
- Koch, John T. (2006). Celtic Culture: A Historical Encyclopedia. Vol. 1–5. ABC-CLIO. ISBN 978-1-85109-440-0.
- Maund, Kari (2006). The Welsh kings: warriors, warlords and princes (3 ed.). Tempus. ISBN 978-0-7524-2973-1.
- Davies, John (2007). A History of Wales. Penguin History. ISBN 978-0-14-028475-1.
- Jenkins, Geraint H. (2007). A Concise History of Wales. Cambridge University Press. ISBN 978-0-521-82367-8.
- Davies, John; Jenkins, Nigel; Baines, Menna; Lynch, Peredur I., eds. (2008). The Welsh Academy Encyclopaedia of Wales (1st ed.). Cardiff: University of Wales Press. ISBN 978-0-7083-1953-6.
- Davies, John (2009). The Making of Wales (2 ed.). The History Press. ISBN 978-0-7524-5241-8.
- Williams (Ysgafell), Jane (2010) [1st pub. 1869]. A History of Wales: Derived from Authentic Sources. Cambridge: Cambridge University Press. ISBN 978-1-108-02085-5.
- Farmer, David (2011). The Oxford Dictionary of Saints (5th., rev ed.). Oxford University Press. ISBN 978-0-19-959660-7.
- Charles-Edwards, T. (2013). Wales and the Britons, 350–1064. Vol. 1. Oxford University Press. ISBN 978-0-19-821731-2.
- Davies, Russell (2015). People, Places and Passions:" Pain and Pleasure": A Social History of Wales and the Welsh, 1870–1945. University of Wales Press. ISBN 978-1-78316-237-6.
- Allen, Grant (2016). Anglo-Saxon Britain. Wentworth Press. ISBN 978-1-360-29010-2.
- Ross, David (2019). Wales History of a Nation. Waverley Books Ltd. ISBN 978-1-84-934333-6.

== Online sources ==
=== National ===
- Dictionary of Welsh Biography (National Library of Wales)
- Oxford Dictionary of National Biography - subscription or sign in with library ID
- Welsh Journals online (National Library of Wales)
- Welsh Newspapers online (National Library of Wales)
- Royal Commission on the Ancient and Historical Monuments of Wales
- Coflein RCAHMW online site: Roman remains in Wales
- Cadw (Welsh Government Historic Environment Service)
- Historic Wales (Welsh Government mapping site)
- Ecclesiastical History of the English Nation (Bede) Book I, Fordham University
- Ecclesiastical History of the English Nation (Bede) Book II, Fordham University
- Ecclesiastical History of the English Nation (Bede) Book III, Fordham University
- Ecclesiastical History of the English Nation (Bede) Book IV, Fordham University
- Ecclesiastical History of the English Nation (Bede) Book V, Fordham University
- "Nennius: The History of the Britons, in Six Old English Chronicles (1847)". Translated by J. A. Giles.
- Historical, geographical and ecclesiastical sources on GENUKI
- British History online (Wales)
- Historical maps at the National Library of Scotland
- Domesday Book (1086), covering some border areas of Wales

=== Local ===
- Heneb (formerly the four regional Archaeological Trusts - Clwyd-Powys, Dyfed, Glamorgan-Gwent and Gwynedd)
- "GGAT 72 Overviews" (PDF). A Report for Cadw by Edith Evans BA PhD MIFA and Richard Lewis BA. Glamorgan-Gwent Archaeological Trust. 2003. Archived from the original (PDF) on 1 February 2023.
- G. H. Smith (2008). "Iron Age Settlements in Wales: Cadw Defended Enclosures Publication – Hillforts and Hut Groups in North-West Wales" (PDF). Gwynedd Archaeological Trust.
