= British Academy Book Prize =

Award held annually from 2000 to 2005

The British Academy Book Prize was an annual book award held by the British Academy in the period from 2000 and 2005. Eligible titles were those covering areas of the humanities and social sciences.

== Winners ==
- 2001 Rees Davies for The First English Empire: Power and Identities in the British Isles 1093-1343, jointly with Ian Kershaw for Hitler: 1936–1945, Nemesis
- 2002 Stanley Cohen for States of Denial: Knowing about Atrocities and Suffering
- 2003 Elizabeth Cowling for Picasso Style and Meaning
- 2004 Diarmaid MacCulloch for Reformation: Europe's House Divided 1490-1700
- 2005 N.A.M. Rodger for The Command of the Sea: A Naval History of Britain, 1649-1815
