= A History of Christianity =

A History of Christianity may refer to:

- A History of Christianity (Johnson book), 1976 book by the English journalist and popular historian Paul Johnson
- A History of Christianity (TV series), 2009 BBC television series presented by the English historian Diarmaid MacCulloch
- A History of Christianity: The First Three Thousand Years, 2009 book by the English historian Diarmaid MacCulloch

== See also ==
- A Short History of Christianity, 2012 book by the Australian historian Geoffrey Blainey
- Christianity: A History, 2009 television series produced by Pioneer Productions
