= A History of the Jews =

1987 book by Paul Johnson

- Title page for A History of the Jews (1987)
- Author: Paul Johnson
- Language: English
- Genre: Non-fiction
- Publication date: 1987
- Publication place: United Kingdom

A History of the Jews is a 1987 historical book by British historian Paul Johnson. The book provides a broad survey of Jewish history, tracing the development of Jewish culture, religion, and identity from ancient times to the modern era. Johnson explores the Jewish people's contributions to civilization, their resilience in the face of persecution, and their influence on global history.

== Background ==
Paul Johnson, a historian and journalist, is known for his works on history and civilization, including Modern Times (1983), and A History of Christianity (1976). In A History of the Jews, Johnson aims to provide a comprehensive narrative of Jewish history from its origins to the 20th century. Unlike some academic treatments of Jewish history, the book is written for a general audience, balancing scholarly research with engaging storytelling.

== Summary ==
The book is divided into several chronological sections, covering key periods in Jewish history:

- Ancient Israel: Johnson discusses the early Hebrews, the biblical narratives until the doomed Judah's revolts against Babylon and the formation of Jewish identity during and after the Late Bronze Age collapse. Starting with Abraham or more precisely, with the city of Hebron, which certainly does exist, even if the tradition that Abraham is buried there is taken to be a myth. The fact that Jews continue to live in Hebron today allows Johnson to begin with an example of what he calls “Jewish obstinacy over 4,000 years.” Johnson makes a case for Merneptah to be the pharaoh of the Exodus. He also hints, very briefly, that the Exodus story may have arisen out of various Semitic movements out of Egypt at different times during the reigns of Rameses II and Merneptah. Contrary to most authors today (and then), Johnson saw the Book of Joshua as historically reliable. Johnson also supported the existence of a united monarchy under the reigns of Saul, Ish-bosheth, David, and Solomon; while acknowledging that the biblical narrative can be exaggerated.
- The Second Temple Period: Covers Jewish history under Persian, Greek, and Roman rule, including the idea of the Messiah, the Maccabees, the Apocalyptic literature, Herod, Jesus, Early Christianity, Paul, the Jewish–Roman wars, the rise of Rabbinic Judaism and the split of Christianity and Judaism.
- The Middle Ages: Examines Augustine's teachings about Jews and Judaism within their contemporary context of Christian anti-Judaism and the imperial church's exercise of coercive force against religious minorities, Muhammad's views on Jews and Jewish life in Christian and Islamic lands, highlighting periods of coexistence and persecution.
- The Enlightenment and Emancipation: Discusses Jewish integration into European society and the challenges of modernity, specifically the Protestant Reformation (particularly Martin Luther's antisemitism), Baruch Spinoza, the disillusionment provoked by Sabbatai Zevi, Israel ben Eliezer, the rise of Hasidism, the end of the Jewish ghettos, finalizing with Karl Marx’s atheist apocalypticism and antisemitic views.
- The 20th Century: Covers Zionism, the Israeli–Palestinian conflict (until 1987), Nazism, the Holocaust, the Sergeants affair, the establishment of the State of Israel and Israel's nuclear weapons program.

Throughout the book, Johnson also reflects on Jewish contributions to philosophy, science, economics, and politics, emphasizing their role in shaping Western civilization.

== Reception ==
A History of the Jews has been widely praised for its accessibility and breadth. Some critics have commended Johnson’s engaging writing style and ability to synthesize complex historical themes. A review by Kirkus Reviews highlights Johnson’s sympathetic approach to Jewish history and his focus on external influences shaping Jewish life. The review also commends his treatment of the "rise of modern Israel."

However, some scholars have criticized the book for its occasional generalizations and lack of deeper analysis on certain topics. Despite these criticisms, the book remains a useful introduction to Jewish history.

== Influence ==
The book has been used as a reference in discussions on Jewish identity, historical resilience, and the Jewish diaspora. It has been cited in academic works and is often recommended for readers interested in a broad yet accessible overview of Jewish history. HarperCollins, the publisher, describes the book as a "comprehensive 4,000-year survey" of Jewish history, emphasizing its role as a national bestseller.

Aish.com, a Jewish educational website, has noted Johnson’s deep admiration for Jewish perseverance and their impact on civilization. He emphasized that the Jewish people’s resilience, innovation, and moral contributions have shaped global history in profound ways. Johnson is quoted as saying, "No people has ever insisted more firmly than the Jews that history has a purpose and that humanity has a destiny." His perspective contrasts with many secular historians, as he attributes Jewish survival and influence to a strong sense of purpose and ethical values.
