= When Was Wales? =

Book by Gwyn A. Williams

When Was Wales? is a 1985 book on the history of Wales by Professor Gwyn A. Williams, a Welsh historian and political activist.

The book is described as his perhaps most influential work. Williams suggests in the book that the Welsh nation has been shaped by a series of conflicts, splits, and ruptures.

A quotation from the book is that Wales is a nation that has "survived in crisis." It suggests that Wales has developed some form of collective amnesia, "Half-memories, folklore … fantasy are rampant. We are a people with plenty of traditions but no historical memory." The review suggests that if Williams were alive today, he would be impressed to see the spectacle of a Wales national football team match of a socially progressive bilingual community.

His former mentee, Professor James Walvin, says, "I think 'When was Wales' is one of the brilliant books of that generation of writing by historians." The book was published during the same year that Williams co-presented 'The Dragon Has Two Tongues", launching his television career. The director of the series Colin Thomas recalls, "I had tried to get Gwyn and Wynford to do a joint book to coincide with the program, but they wouldn't have it. They both wrote books on Welsh history. At the end of filming, Gwyn gave a signed copy of his book 'When was Wales?' to Wynford. He had written in it 'to my beloved enemy' (laughs)."

== See also ==
- A History of Wales (book)
- History Grounded
