= A History of Wales (book) =

Book by John Davies

- Author: John Davies
- Publisher: Penguin Books
- Publication date: 1990
- Pages: 736
- ISBN: 0713990988

A History of Wales or Hanes Cymru (Welsh language equivalent) is a book on the History of Wales by the Welsh historian, John Davies. The book was first published in both Welsh and English in 1990 and has since been renewed in more recent versions.

== About and response ==
The book was first published in Welsh and is considered the definitive guide to Welsh history.

The book was written for Allen Lane as Hanes Cymru in 1990, which was the first book that Penguin ever published in Welsh. The book went on to win a Welsh Arts Council prize and soon afterwards was considered one of the best single book histories of Wales. The English version of the book was then published in 1993.

A new version was published in 2007 and has been described as an authoritative masterpiece by Visit Wales. The book discusses the history of the Ice Age in Wales right up until the end of the 20th century in an unbroken storyline that is discussed in a facetious and memorable way by one of the best possible storytellers.

A new version of the book was published on the 14th of November. This new version discussed recent political events in Wales with Davies responding to a question posed by Gwyn Alf Williams' When Was Wales?, by saying that Wales was yet to reach its fullness with the suggestion that this was yet to come.

In response to the 2014 release, Betsan Powys said of the book (in Welsh) "Oh yes, - the only book ever on Welsh history that I've read from cover to cover - and enjoyed it". The book makes additions that discuss the history of Wales from 1979 onwards. Powys says that Davies incorporates the imagery, the words and the statistics in a way that leads and colours at the same time.

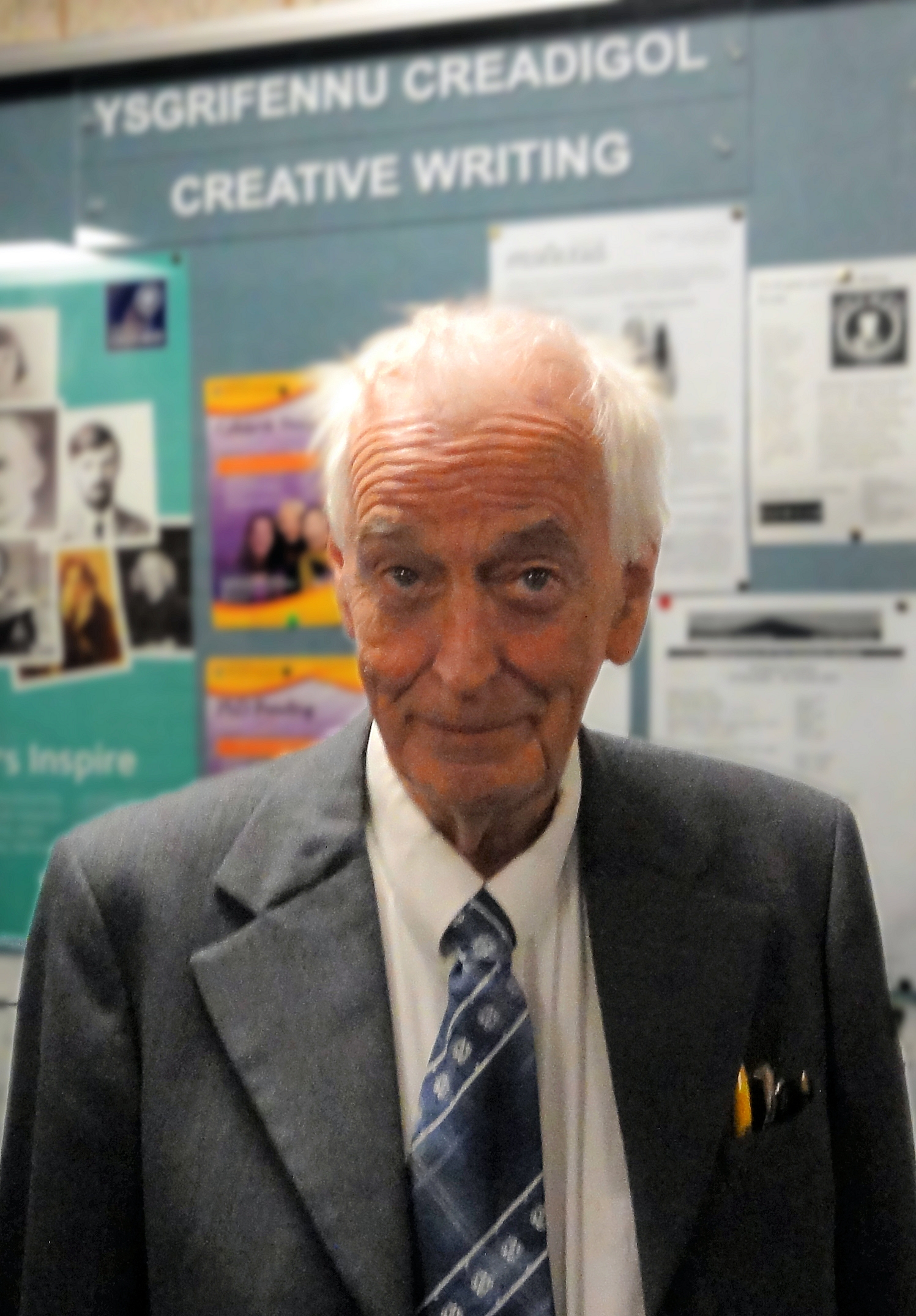
Author, John Davies

Huw Jones, Chairman of the S4C Authority said of the book in 2015, following the death of Davies, "I was once asked to name a Welsh book that everybody should read. My answer was 'Hanes Cymru' – 'The History of Wales' by John Davies. It's a classic volume and a labour of love which presents a deep academic understanding of Wales' history but is both approachable and eloquent, with the English version that followed proving just as successful. It's a must-read for anyone who wants to understand Wales."

Presenter Huw Edwards also commented on Davies and the book; "He had an extraordinary way of sharing his message in an engaging and lively way – in both languages –and that was incontrovertibly proved in his excellent and comprehensive work The History of Wales."

The book has been described by journalist Russel Davies as one of the intellectual foundation blocks of a nation-building process that began in Wales after the 1979 devolution referendum. The book describes the complexities of Wales from a nationalistic perspective with both the rich and powerful discussed alongside the less fortunate and powerless.

Fellow Welsh author, Jon Gower said of Davies, "The fact that he went off to write the history of Wales in nightclubs in Florence is evidence of that – he took very few notes when he went there. He had all the detail in his head and he was very funny."

== See also ==
- When Was Wales?
- History Grounded
