= Oxford History of Wales =

Book series

The Oxford History of Wales is a history series on the history of Wales, written by leading historians for each period. One of the volumes in the series Conquest, Coexistence and Change: Wales 1063–1416 was joint winner of the Wolfson History Prize in 1987.

The series was commissioned by The Oxford University Press, with the first volume (volume 6 in the series) published in 1980. The Series General Editor was the late Glanmor Williams

The series is as yet incomplete with five out of the six planned volumes having so far been published.

== Volumes and Authors ==
The volumes published or announced for the series are as follows:

- Wales and the Britons, 350–1064 — T. M. Charles-Edwards (29 November 2012)
- Conquest, Coexistence and Change: Wales 1063–1416 — R. R. Davies (1987) (republished under the title The Age of Conquest)
- Recovery, Reorientation and Reformation: Wales c.1416–1642 — Glanmor Williams (1987) (republished under the title Renewal and Reformation)
- The Foundations of Modern Wales: Wales 1642–1780 — Geraint H. Jenkins (1987)
- Rebirth of a Nation: Wales 1880–1980 — Kenneth O Morgan (26 March 1980)
