= Lower than the Angels (book) =

2024 book by Diarmaid MacCulloch

- Author: Diarmaid MacCulloch
- Genre: Non-fiction
- Publisher: Penguin Books
- Publication date: 19 September 2024
- Publication place: United Kingdom
- Pages: 688
- ISBN: 9780241400937

Lower than the Angels: A History of Sex and Christianity is a 2024 book by English historian and Oxford University Emeritus Professor of the History of the Church Diarmaid MacCulloch. The book explores the history of Christian debates over sex, gender and family.

== Title ==
The book's title is drawn from chapter 2 of the Epistle to the Hebrews in the New Testament, quoting the Septuagint (Greek) translation of Psalm 8:5, which describes humankind as "for a little while lower than the angels". The original Hebrew speaks of God making humanity "little less than god" (or "the gods"). MacCulloch uses this phrase to query the nature of angels and their capacity for sexuality in the Bible, compared to humanity.

== Reception ==
Lower than the Angels received positive reviews. Former Archbishop of Canterbury Rowan Williams gave the book a 5-star review in The Daily Telegraph, writing that the book offers "a compelling and encyclopedic survey of how Christianity makes sense of sexual desire". In a review in the New York Times, Princeton University lecturer Spencer Strub praised MacCulloch's "dry wit and flair for narrative sweep". Writing in The Guardian, Kathryn Hughes labelled the book "masterly" and wrote that MacCulloch effectively navigated the complexity of the topic without his writing becoming polemical. In a review in the Financial Times, Anglican priest Lucy Winkett described the book as a "magisterial" account, and wrote that it provided "an important and timely contribution to the current debates not just within the Church, but in societies that should understand the influence of Christian teaching on these subjects for good or ill". A review in The Times noted that in addition to its scholarly rigour, the book was often quite humorous.

In a more mixed review for the London Review of Books, Tudor historian Lucy Wooding praised the book as "an erudite, judicious and often sympathetic account of Christian history". However, she noted that it was also "manifestly a book written by a man" which featured little discussion of pregnancy, childbirth and babies, ignoring the fact that "in almost every century under discussion, the point of sex wasn’t just the sexual encounter itself but the pregnancy that might ensue". Wooding further opined that, among MacCulloch's extensive coverage of Christian theological debates, the existence of the Church as a communal "body of faithful believers trying to do the right thing" risked being obscured.
