= Hugh Vaughan-Thomas =

Welsh cricketer

Hugh Vaughan-Thomas (13 May 1910 — 20 October 1986) was a Welsh cricketer. He was a right-handed batsman who played for Glamorgan.

Vaughan-Thomas who, in addition to excelling at cricket, was a talented hockey and tennis player, made his only first-class appearance in 1933, against Gloucestershire. He scored just two runs in the only innings in which he batted.

He was also the younger brother of the famous BBC radio and TV broadcaster Wynford Vaughan-Thomas.
