= Diarmaid MacCulloch =

English historian

The Reverend Diarmaid MacCulloch FSA FRHistS FBA FRSL
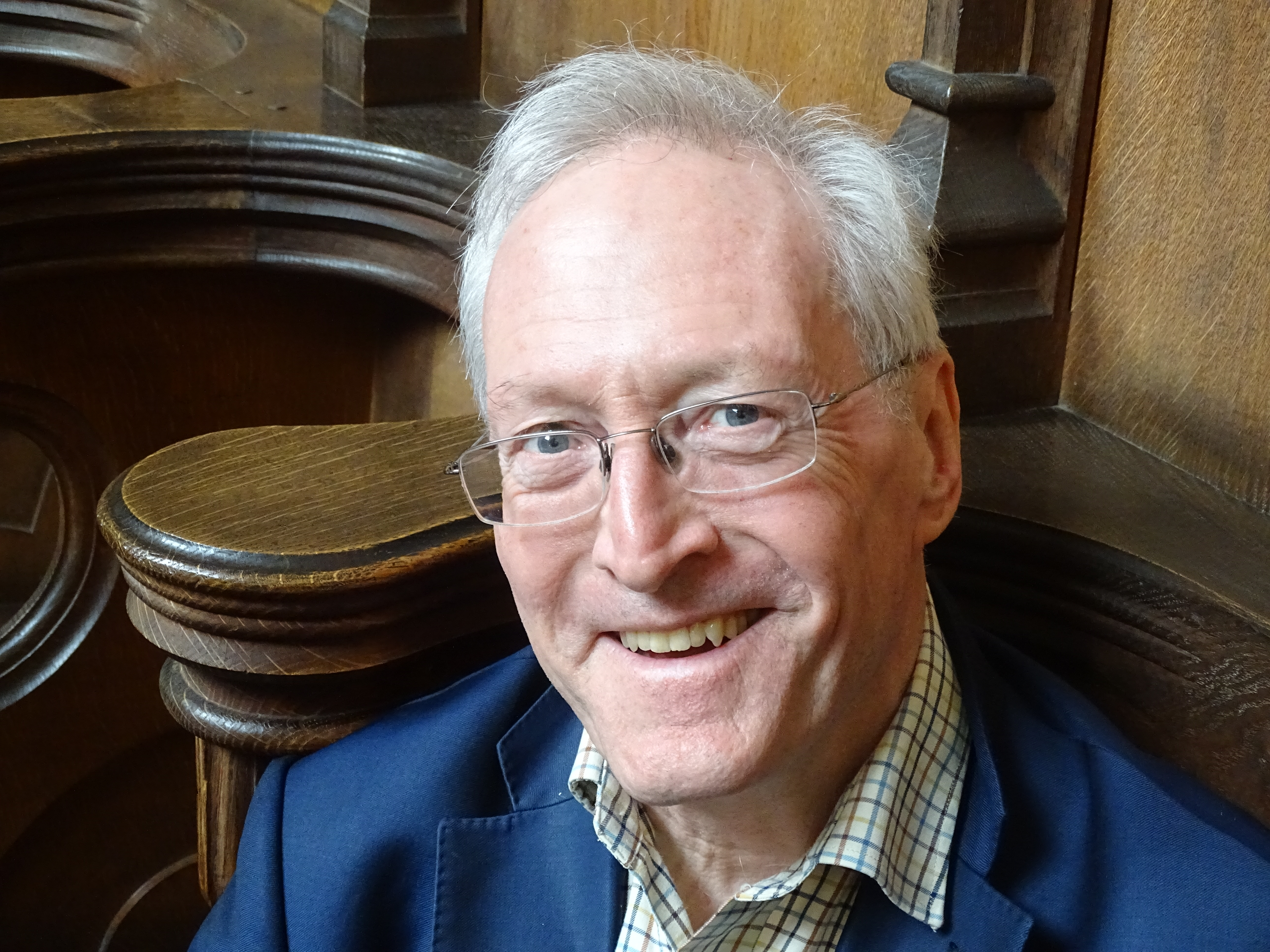
- Born: Diarmaid Ninian John MacCulloch; 31 October 1951 (age 74); Kent, England
- Awards: James Tait Black Prize; National Book Critics Circle Award; British Academy Book Prize; Wolfson History Prize; Hessell-Tiltman Prize; Cundill Prize in History

Academic background
- Education: Churchill College, Cambridge; University of Liverpool; Ripon College Cuddesdon
- Doctoral advisor: Geoffrey Elton

Academic work
- Discipline: History
- Sub-discipline: Ecclesiastical history
- Institutions: Wesley College, Bristol; University of Bristol; St Cross College, Oxford
- Doctoral students: Ethan H. Shagan; Alec Ryrie
- Notable works: The Reformation: A History; A History of Christianity

Ecclesiastical career
- Religion: Christianity (Anglican)
- Church: Church of England
- Ordained: 1987 (deacon)

Diarmaid Ninian John MacCulloch FSA FRHistS FBA FRSL (/ˈdɜːrməd/; born 31 October 1951) is an English academic and historian, specialising in ecclesiastical history and the history of Christianity. Since 1995, he has been a fellow of St Cross College, Oxford; he was formerly the senior tutor. Since 2020, he has been a senior research fellow and archivist at Campion Hall, Oxford. From 1997 to 2019, he was Professor of the History of the Church at the University of Oxford.

Though ordained a deacon in the Church of England, he declined ordination to the priesthood because of the church's attitude to homosexuality. In 2009 he encapsulated the evolution of his religious beliefs: "I was brought up in the presence of the Bible, and I remember with affection what it was like to hold a dogmatic position on the statements of Christian belief. I would now describe myself as a candid friend of Christianity." MacCulloch sits on the editorial board of the Journal of Ecclesiastical History.

== Life ==
Diarmaid MacCulloch was born in Kent, England, to the Rev. Nigel John Howard MacCulloch (an Anglican priest) and Jennie Chappell. He moved to Suffolk as a boy when his father was appointed rector of Wetherden and Haughley. He attended Hillcroft Preparatory School, Haughley and Stowmarket Grammar School. He subsequently studied history at Churchill College, Cambridge, where he obtained a Bachelor of Arts degree in 1972; this was promoted to a Master of Arts degree in 1976. During that period, he was also organ scholar at the college. After completing a Diploma in Archive Administration at Liverpool University in 1973, he then returned to Cambridge to complete a PhD degree in 1977 on Tudor history under the supervision of Geoffrey Elton, combining this with a position as Junior Research Fellow at Churchill College.

MacCulloch joined the Gay Christian Movement in 1976, serving twice on its committee and briefly as honorary secretary. From 1978 to 1990 he tutored at Wesley College, Bristol, and taught church history in the department of theology at the University of Bristol. He interrupted his teaching to study for the Oxford Diploma in Theology (awarded 1987) at Ripon College Cuddesdon. In 1987 he was ordained a deacon in the Church of England and from 1987 to 1988 he served as a non-stipendiary minister at All Saints' Clifton with St John's in the Diocese of Bristol. However, in response to a motion put before the General Synod in 1987 by Tony Higton regarding the sexuality of clergy, he declined ordination to the priesthood and ceased to minister at Clifton.

Regarding the conflict between his homosexuality and the Church of England and his own retreat from orthodoxy he said:

I was ordained Deacon. But, being a gay man, it was just impossible to proceed further, within the conditions of the Anglican set-up, because I was determined that I would make no bones about who I was; I was brought up to be truthful, and truth has always mattered to me. The Church couldn't cope and so we parted company. It was a miserable experience.

MacCulloch was awarded a Doctor of Divinity (DD) degree by the University of Oxford in 2001.

In 1996 his book Thomas Cranmer: A Life won the James Tait Black Memorial Prize. His 2003 book Reformation: Europe's House Divided 1490–1700 won the 2004 National Book Critics Circle Award, the 2004 British Academy Book Prize and the Wolfson History Prize. A History of Christianity: The First Three Thousand Years was published in September 2009 with a related 6-part television series called A History of Christianity which first aired on BBC4 in 2009 and then on BBC2 and BBC4 in 2010. The book won McGill University's Cundill Prize in History, a $75,000 prize, the largest such prize in Canada at the time.

In 2011, he delivered the Gifford Lectures on Silence in Christian History: the witness of Holmes' Dog at the University of Edinburgh. In 2012, he wrote and presented How God Made the English, a three-part documentary series tracing the history of English identity from the Dark Ages to the present day. In 2013 he presented a documentary on Thomas Cromwell and his place in English ecclesiastical and political history. His 2015 series Sex and the Church on BBC Two explored how Christianity has shaped western attitudes to sex, gender and sexuality throughout history.

In 2018, MacCulloch published the biography Thomas Cromwell: A Life. MacCulloch sits on the European Advisory Board of Princeton University Press.

In 2019, MacCulloch retired as Professor of the History of the Church and was made professor emeritus. In addition to his position at St Cross College, he has been a senior research fellow in church history and archivist at Campion Hall, Oxford since 2020.

== Honours ==
MacCulloch was elected a Fellow of the Society of Antiquaries of London (FSA) in 1978, a Fellow of the Royal Historical Society (FRHistS) in 1982, and a Fellow of the British Academy (FBA) in 2001. In 2003, he was awarded an honorary Doctor of Letters (DLitt) degree by the University of East Anglia. He was knighted in the 2012 New Year Honours for services to scholarship. While Debrett's gives his formal style as "Prof Sir", MacCulloch has expressed the preference that he not be addressed in that manner, in accordance with protocol which dictates that clergy holding knighthoods are addressed as "Sir" only if so honoured before their ordination. He was elected a Fellow of the Royal Society of Literature (FRSL) in 2025.

- 1996 James Tait Black Memorial Prize for Thomas Cranmer: A Life
- 2004 National Book Critics Circle Award for Reformation: Europe's House Divided 1490–1700
- 2004 British Academy Book Prize for Reformation: Europe's House Divided 1490–1700
- 2004 Wolfson History Prize for Reformation: Europe's House Divided 1490–1700
- 2010 Hessell-Tiltman Prize for A History of Christianity
- 2010 Cundill Prize in History for A History of Christianity

In 2021, he was awarded a Festschrift titled "Contesting Orthodoxies in the History of Christianity: Essays in Honour of Diarmaid MacCulloch".

== Selected works ==
=== Filmography ===
- A History of Christianity (TV series) (2009)
- How God Made the English (2012)
- Henry VIII's Enforcer: The Rise and Fall of Thomas Cromwell (2013)
- Sex and the Church (2015)

=== Books ===
- Suffolk and the Tudors: Politics and Religion in an English County 1500–1600 (Oxford, Clarendon Press, 1986) ISBN 9780198229148
- Groundwork of Christian History (London, Epworth Press, 1987)
- The Later Reformation in England (1990) ISBN 9780333419298
- Henry VIII: Politics, Policy, and Piety (1995) ISBN 9780333578575
- Thomas Cranmer: A Life (Yale University Press, 1996) ISBN 9780300074482
- Tudor Church Militant: Edward VI and the Protestant Reformation (1999)
  - republished as The Boy King: Edward VI and the Protestant Reformation (2001) ISBN 9780312238308
- Reformation: Europe's House Divided 1490–1700 (2003)
  - republished as The Reformation: A History (2005)
  - German: Die Reformation 1490-1700 (Deutsche Verlags-Anstalt, 2008) ISBN 9783421059505
- A History of Christianity: The First Three Thousand Years. London: Allen Lane. 2009. ISBN 978-0-7139-9869-6.
- Silence: A Christian History (London, Allen Lane, 2013)
- All Things Made New: The Reformation and its Legacy (London, Allen Lane, 2016) ISBN 9780190616816
- Thomas Cromwell: A Life (London, Allen Lane, 2018) ISBN 9780670025572
- Tudor Rebellions (2020) ISBN 9780367345525
- Lower than the Angels: A History of Sex and Christianity (2024)

=== Articles ===
- Diarmaid MacCulloch, "Fighting Monks" (review of Francis Young, Silence of the Gods: The Untold History of Europe's Last Pagan Peoples, Cambridge, 2025, 432 pp., ISBN 978 1 00 958657 3; and Aleksander Pluskowski, The Black Cross: A History of the Baltic Crusades, Yale, 2026, 447 pp., ISBN 978 0 300 27906 1), London Review of Books, vol. 48, no. 9 (21 May 2026), pp. 13–16. "Anglophone readers are doubly blessed with this pair of illuminating introductions to a region of Europe still unfamiliar to many." (p. 16.)
