= Sex and the Church =

2015 British television documentary

- Genre: Documentary
- Directed by: Robin Dashwood (episode 1); Charles Colville (episode 2 & 3)
- Presented by: Diarmaid MacCulloch
- Country of origin: United Kingdom
- Original language: English
- No. of series: 1
- No. of episodes: 3 (list of episodes)

Original release
- Network: BBC Two
- Release: 10 April – 24 April 2015

Sex and the Church is a British documentary series about how Christianity has shaped western attitudes to sex, gender and sexuality throughout history. It was shown on BBC Two and hosted by historian Diarmaid MacCulloch.

MacCulloch, whose books have won a number of prizes, is not only an Oxford Professor of the History of the Church but also a veteran campaigner for the Gay Christian Movement.

== Episode list ==
No.	Title	Directed and produced by	Original release date
1	"From Pleasure to Sin"	Robin Dashwood	10 April 2015
How Christianity shaped western attitudes to sex, gender and sexuality in its first thousand years
2	"Sexual Revolution"	Charles Colville	17 April 2015
Institutionalising marriage from the eleventh century and the changes brought about by the Reformation
3	"Christianity v The West"	Charles Colville	24 April 2015
Explores how the official Christian Church and Western society have moved apart on issues of sex and gender over the last 300 years.

== Synopsis ==
=== From pleasure to sin ===
For the Jews, procreation was the vital aspect of sex, but it was celebrated as part of a polygamous male-centred culture. Celibacy, adultery and homosexuality were outlawed. The Greek culture dominant at the time of Christ celebrated sexuality, particularly the male body and wives had no more rights than slaves. But there was another strand, the world of the spirit being more important to Plato and Aristotle with a denial of the flesh.

Jesus decreed monogamy and no divorce but said little else about it and he was not representative of his church in other ways. Paul praised celibacy but was divided: he called one woman an apostle but forbade women from speaking in church.

In the second century, Anthony of Egypt became the most famous of hermits who brought in the idea of monks and nuns from the Syrian understanding of Buddhism and Hinduism. The apocryphal Gospel of James elaborated Mary's story and introduced the idea of her perpetual virginity and miraculous conception. People began to explain away Jesus's brothers and sisters, so that the most important marriage in the Christian story does not involve sex at all. Clement of Alexandria taught that sex except for procreation is wrong and Origen castrated himself to avoid temptation.

After Constantine's vision of the Cross before the Battle of the Milvian Bridge had in his view given him the empire, he aligned Christianity with imperial power. Jerome tried to be a monk but became secretary to the bishop of Rome where he attacked Helvidius who claimed that Mary had enjoyed family life, and claimed that Joseph as well as Mary was a virgin.

Augustine's sexual conflicts lay at the root of his teaching about sex summed up by the biblical exhortation "make no provision for the flesh". Holiness demanded control, the opposite of lust which he decided was a consequence of the fall: it explains our conviction that sex is shameful.

When Roman power collapsed in the fourth century, Christianity stepped into the power vacuum. Teaching was spread by the monasteries and the penitential laid out endless rules about sex: on only 100 days a year was any sex permitted and years of penitence were decreed for any non-acceptable behaviour such as oral sex or masturbation.

=== Sexual revolution ===
It was not until Pope Gregory VII in the 11th century that marriage became a Christian ceremony. To ensure inheritance, couples must then be married by a priest and rules including the prohibition of seventh cousins marrying gave large powers to the church who would sell dispensations for marriage or annulment for large sums. Under the Sarum Rite, marriages only took place in the porch of the church, but this ambivalence slowly dissolved. In 1139 priestly marriages were declared invalid and the celibate priests increasingly saw themselves as superior. Women who had learning and a voice through the monasteries, were now excluded from the new universities and some resorted to mysticism, which often had erotic overtones.

Excessive sexual desire even for your own wife was now seen as wrong. But alongside this grew the tradition of courtly love, which celebrated adultery and even homosexuality. Thomas Aquinas said that the greatest castle needed a sewer and the churches allowed brothels—the 'stews'—next to the cathedral.

In the 16th century Martin Luther rebelled against the church's monopoly. He rejected Augustine's idea of original sin as transmitted through sex, and the sacramental nature of marriage. He decided that all clergy should be married, leading by example and having six children in eight years. The Anabaptists of Münster went a lot further, and John of Leiden even introduced polygamy during the year-long siege of the town by the local bishop. He was captured and tortured with several others and their bodies displayed in a cage on the side of the church.

One aim of the Counter-Reformation was to put this revolution back in the box. Part of the effort was the establishment of the Pious schools by Joseph Calasanz in Spain in the early 17th century. Unfortunately the headmaster of the school in Naples, Father Stefano Cherubini, was found to be sexually abusing his pupils. Because of his powerful Papal connections, Calasanz didn't sack him but instead promoted him, so that he eventually displaced Calasanz.

Across Europe, women were accused of witchcraft by both Catholics and Protestants. Many were tortured into confessing sex with the devil in the Würzburg witch trial. In 1590, even bad weather was blamed on witchcraft and 80 of 100 burned at the stake were women.

=== Christianity versus the West ===
The 18th century saw the enlightenment with the Christian authorities losing control of sex. In London's Covent Garden there were all types of prostitutes by 1711 and meeting places for gays called "Molly houses" where same-sex marriage was performed.

John Wesley's evangelical revival saw a new role for women with the woman preachers such as Sarah Crosby and women started to become the bulk of the congregations. But after Wesley's death, the Methodist conference in 1803 stopped women preachers and a promising start faded out, just as in the early church.

The French Revolution stripped the church of its wealth and killed 2,000 priests, marriage became secular, divorce was permitted and homosexuality legitimised, though peace with the church was restored by Napoleon. Secular marriage was restored in the 1830s in England by civil registration which spread to all European countries and divorce was permitted from 1857, although the Church of England wouldn't accept the remarriage of divorcees until 2002.

Very often reforming legislation was supported by some within the church. Thus Josephine Butler led the campaign against the Contagious Diseases Act; Bishop John Colenso argued in favour of tolerance of polygamy where it was traditional in Africa; in 1930 the Lambeth Conference accepted the need for condoms in specific situations; Derrick Sherwin Bailey argued for the decriminalization of homosexuality.

But the Catholic church generally battened down the hatches, although scandals forfeited trust, with Pope Benedict resigning at the height of the child sexual abuse scandals.
