= History Grounded =

Book by Elin Jones

History Grounded or Hanes yn y Tir (Welsh version) is a book on the history of Wales by Welsh historian Elin Jones.

The book is aimed at children and is used in all schools in Wales to aid Welsh history teaching and is provided in both Welsh and English.

== About ==
The book was launched on 29 September 2021. The book is a visual journey of the last 5,000 years of Welsh history and includes references to the first people to live in Wales, the importance of Owain Glyndŵr, Wales' role in the slave trade and the influence of the sea. The book's cover shows the Red Wall of Wales including references to local areas and campaigns including LGBT+ and Black lives matter. According to the publisher of the book, Gwasg Carreg Gwalch, suggested that the book is "must-have" and is suitable for children aged 8 to 12. The publisher says that the book includes a diverse account of Welsh history with diversity becoming a more important theme in recent times ad added that “This is the most comprehensive, colourful, and ambitious Welsh history book for children. It’s a game changer.”

Journalist Ifan Morgan Jones says that the book is "always engaging and never dry." The author's distinct voice is clear explains that those who live peacefully are often not remembered to the same extent as others, and that primary sources can even perpetuate slanted views. The book also acknowledges that history is often written by privileged rich men throughout the ages, and so Elin Jones brings forth the narratives of women. Ifan Morgan Jones suggests that the book could be used as a teaching aid for the new Welsh history curriculum of 2022/2023.

Jones was interviewed about the book on BBC Radio Wales by Roy Noble in 2022.

== Welsh history teaching ==
=== Launch in schools ===
The book was provided to schools by the Welsh Government in early 2022 in time for the 2022/2023 academic year. Improving the teaching of Welsh history was part of the cooperation agreement between Plaid Cymru and Welsh Labour.

Jeremy Miles, Minister for Education and the Welsh Language, said that he wants to make sure that pupils get an education where they leave school with an appreciation for Wales' history including major events and experiences of people and communities from different parts of Wales.

Elin Jones, the author said that the book puts an emphasis on pupils local area as well as a diverse Welsh history. Jones said that the aim of the book was to allow children to understand how their local history and Welsh history "shaped the landscape of Wales and how the clues to the history of their cynefin can be found around them in things like buildings and local place names."

Sian Gwenllian, the designated member from Plaid Cymru for the cooperation agreement, noted Wales' story has become compulsory, in the school curriculum and that Elin Jones' book adds a "positive development" and will help to support teachers in teaching Welsh history. Gwenllian added that a proper understanding of Welsh history is an "integral part of ensuring that young people in Wales understand their nation’s past, present and future."

=== Concerns of Elin Jones ===
The book is now found in every school in Wales. Elin Jones said that she was worried that the state of Welsh history teaching will be in the "same position as we were 20 years ago". Jones said that she wants to see "more than legislating" and that teachers need to be shown how to deliver the history which includes ethnic minority history and incorporating Welsh history teaching with a wider context. She said that there is no guidance for teachers to deliver this.

== Awards ==
The book made the shortlist for the Tir na n-Og Welsh language secondary age shortlist in 2022, described as "A beautiful book that, in its simplicity of presentation and language, makes complex history accessible to the reader."

== See also ==
- A History of Wales (book)
- When Was Wales?
