= Wynford Vaughan-Thomas =

Welsh journalist

Wynford Vaughan-Thomas CBE
- Born: Lewis John Wynford Thomas; 15 August 1908; Swansea, Glamorgan, Wales
- Died: 4 February 1987 (aged 78); Fishguard, Pembrokeshire, Wales
- Education: Bishop Gore School
- Alma mater: Exeter College, Oxford
- Occupations: Broadcaster, journalist and writer
- Employer(s): BBC, HTV
- Spouse: Charlotte Rowlands (m. 1946)

Lewis John Wynford Vaughan-Thomas (né Thomas) CBE (15 August 1908 – 4 February 1987) was a Welsh newspaper journalist and radio and television broadcaster. In later life he took the name Vaughan-Thomas after his father.

== Early life and education ==
Thomas was born in Swansea, in South Wales, the second son of Dr. David Vaughan Thomas, a Professor of Music, and Morfydd Lewis, the daughter of Daniel Lewis who was one of the leaders of the Rebecca Riots in Pontarddulais. He was the older brother of Hugh Vaughan-Thomas.

He attended Swansea Grammar School, in the Mount Pleasant district of Swansea. At Exeter College, Oxford, he read modern history and gained a second class academic degree.

== Career ==
=== BBC ===
In the mid-1930s, Vaughan-Thomas joined the BBC and, in 1937, gave the Welsh-language commentary on the coronation of King George VI and Queen Elizabeth. This was the precursor to several English-language commentaries on state occasions he was to give after the Second World War. During the war, he established his name and reputation as one of the BBC's most distinguished war correspondents. His most memorable report was from an RAF Lancaster bomber during a real bombing raid over Nazi Berlin. Other notable reports were from the Battle of Anzio, the Burgundy vineyards, Lord Haw-Haw's broadcasting studio and the Belsen concentration camp.

In 1953, he was one of a team of BBC commentators on the coronation of Queen Elizabeth II. He commentated on the funeral of his fellow wartime BBC correspondent Richard Dimbleby in 1965.

=== Harlech Television ===
In 1967, after leaving the BBC, Vaughan-Thomas was one of the founders of Harlech Television (HTV, now ITV Wales), being appointed director of programmes. As a frequent TV broadcaster himself throughout his early career with the BBC, he had adopted the required BBC accent of the time, but employed his more natural native Welsh accent to even better effect in his later career.

He served as a Governor of the British Film Institute between 1977 and 1980.

In 1985, Vaughan-Thomas notably presented the 13-part series The Dragon Has Two Tongues with Gwyn Alf Williams. The series saw lengthy and often passionate discussions on Welsh history, with the two presenters representing opposing points of view, Williams being a Marxist historian and Vaughan-Thomas being described by Geraint H. Jenkins as his "affable Whiggish co-presenter".

=== Writing ===
Vaughan-Thomas wrote numerous books, many on Wales and a favourite subject of his, the Welsh countryside.

His wartime overview and experiences, and his successful broadcasting career later, enabled him to view life and its vagaries with what he called "pointless optimism"—a perspective that served him.

His 1961 book Anzio was adapted as the 1968 Italian-American film Anzio, about the Battle of Anzio, the Allied seaborne assault on the Italian port of Anzio south of Rome during the Second World War.

=== Heritage ===
In May 1970, when president of the Council for the Protection of Rural Wales, Vaughan-Thomas officially opened the Pembrokeshire Coast Path in the Pembrokeshire Coast National Park at its southern end, at Amroth.

== Private life ==
In 1946, Thomas married Charlotte Rowlands.

== Honours ==
He was appointed Officer of the Order of the British Empire (OBE) in the 1974 Birthday Honours for services to Wales, and promoted Commander (CBE) in the 1986 Birthday Honours for services to Welsh culture.

He died in Fishguard, Pembrokeshire, on 4 February 1987, aged 78.

== Memorial ==
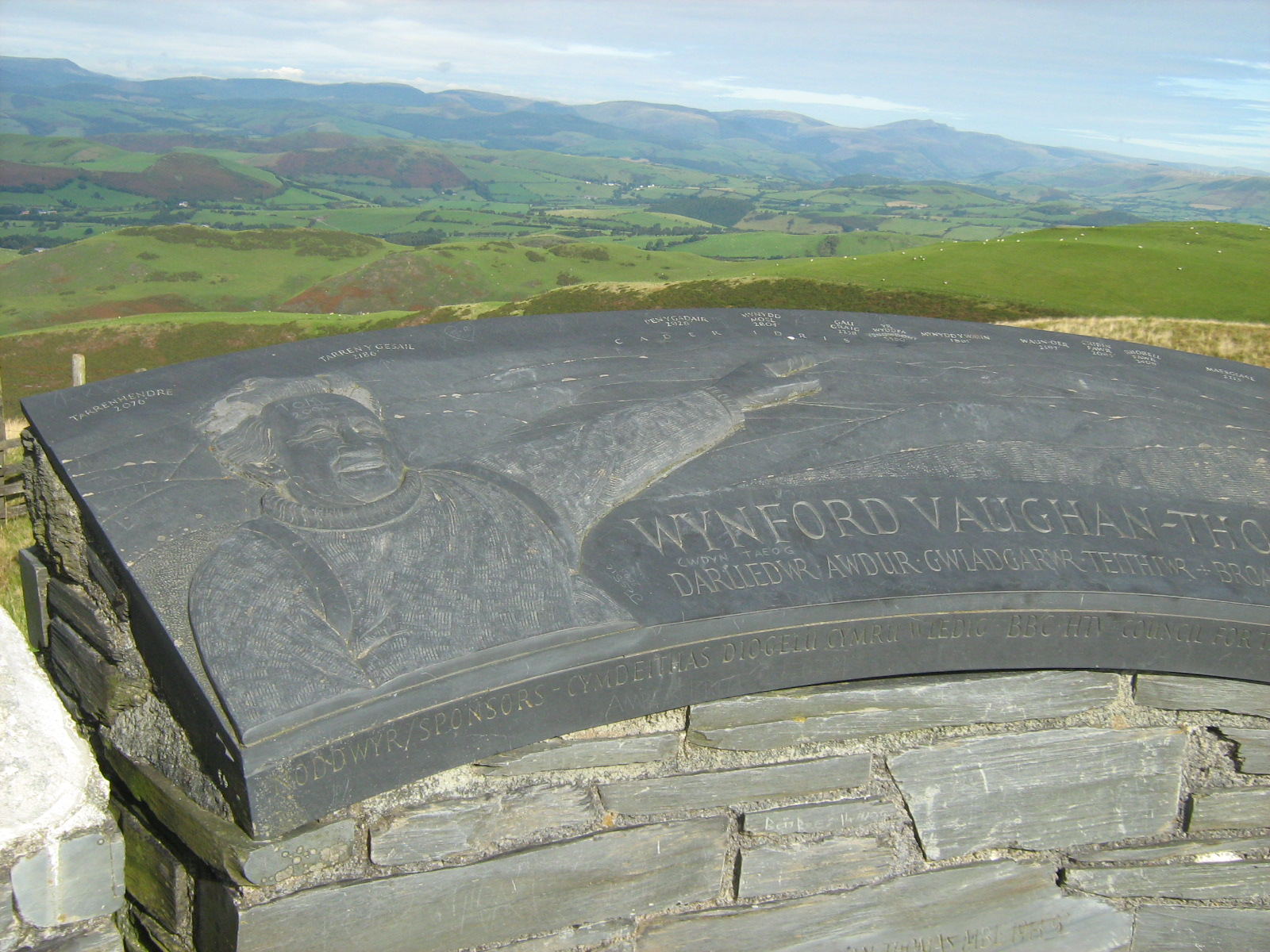
Memorial toposcope, Vaughan-Thomas pointing towards Snowdon

A memorial was constructed after his death, completed and unveiled in 1990 at Cadair viewpoint, near Aberhosan (at 52.5489°N 3.7183°W), in the form of a toposcope looking out over the rolling hills and mountains of Wales, with a depiction of Vaughan-Thomas pointing towards Snowdon, Wales' highest peak, which is just visible on a clear day.

== Works ==
- Anzio (1961)
- Madly in All Directions (1967)
- The Shell Guide to Wales (1969, with Alun Llewellyn)
- Portrait of Gower (1976)
- Great Little Trains Of Wales (1976)
- Trust to Talk (1980)
- Wynford Vaughan-Thomas's Wales (1981)
- Princes of Wales (1982)
- The Countryside Companion (1983)
- Dalgety (1984)
- Wales: a History (1985)
- How I Liberated Burgundy: And Other Vinous Adventures (1985)
