= How God Made the English =

2012 British history TV series

- Genre: Documentary
- Directed by: Anna Cox (episodes 1 and 2); Gillian Bancroft (episode 3)
- Presented by: Diarmaid MacCulloch
- Country of origin: United Kingdom
- Original language: English
- No. of series: 1
- No. of episodes: 3 (list of episodes)

Original release
- Network: BBC Two
- Release: 17 March – 31 March 2012

How God Made the English was a British documentary series about the English national identity and its history. It was shown on BBC Two and hosted by historian Diarmaid MacCulloch.

== Episode list ==
No.	Title	Director and Producer	Original release date
1	"A Chosen People?"	Anna Cox	17 March 2012
2	"A Tolerant People?"	Anna Cox	24 March 2012
3	"A White and Christian People?"	Gillian Bancroft	31 March 2012

== A Chosen People? ==
In the first episode Bede’s history is suggested as the origin of the English identity as a Chosen people by God.
