= A History of Christianity: The First Three Thousand Years =

2009 book by Diarmaid MacCulloch

- Cover of the first edition
- Author: Diarmaid MacCulloch
- Language: English
- Subject: Ecclesiastical history
- Publisher: Allen Lane
- Publication date: 2009
- Media type: Print
- Pages: xvii, 1161 p.
- ISBN: 978-0-7139-9869-6
- Dewey Decimal: 270
- LC Class: BR150 .M33 2009

A History of Christianity: The First Three Thousand Years is a 2009 book written by the English ecclesiastical historian Diarmaid MacCulloch, Professor of the History of the Church at the University of Oxford. It is a survey of the historical development of the Christian religion since its inception in the 1st century to the contemporary era. The first American edition was titled Christianity: The First Three Thousand Years, published in 2010 by Viking Press, imprint of Penguin Books.

== Reception ==
In a review at the London Review of Books, Frank Kermode notes that the subtitle of the book, 'The First Three Thousand Years', includes the ancient world of Greece, Rome, and Judaism (c. 1000 BC – AD 100) that so influenced Christianity.

A review by the then Archbishop of Canterbury Rowan Williams for The Guardian describes the book as beginning "with what turns out to be one of many tours de force in summarising the intellectual and social background of Christianity in the classical as well as the Jewish world, so that we can see something of the issues to which the Christian faith offered a startlingly new response.... [MacCulloch] shows an extraordinary familiarity with specialist literature in practically every area." The book is "a landmark in its field, astonishing in its range, compulsively readable, full of insight even for the most jaded professional and of illumination for the interested general reader. It will have few if any, rivals in the English language" and provides "crucial testimony to the resilience of the Christian community in a remarkable diversity of social settings."

Eamon Duffy's review for The Daily Telegraph remarks that MacCulloch "tries to write, he tells us, with historical detachment, but also as a 'candid friend’ of Christianity, a movement which he believes still has a long history ahead of it" and that he "has given us a model of lucid and sympathetic exposition, vast in scale, wide in coverage, and conspicuously fair-minded."

Jon Meacham in his New York Times review writes that it "is difficult to imagine a more comprehensive and surprisingly accessible volume on the subject than MacCulloch's." He characterizes as mutually-corrupting the "accommodations with the princes of the world [that] drove the rise of the faith," which the book relates. Thus, for "'most of its existence, Christianity has been the most intolerant of world faiths,' MacCulloch says, 'doing its best to eliminate all competitors, with Judaism a qualified exception.'" MacCulloch describes the Christian faith as "a perpetual argument about meaning and reality." Meacham makes the related point that "questions of meaning – who are we, how shall we live, where are we going? – tend to be framed in theological and philosophical terms." Still, "history matters, too, and historians, MacCulloch says, have a moral task: 'They should seek to promote sanity and to curb the rhetoric which breeds fanaticism'."

Historian Paul Johnson in a review for The Spectator writes that the author "seems anxious to downgrade the importance and uniqueness of Jesus of Nazareth in founding the religion which bears his name" and that the "section on Jesus is not much more than 20 pages, and reflects all the most irritating aspects of modern Anglican New Testament criticism." Still, "the source notes are often more interesting than the text, and the bibliography is thorough and up-to-date, the most useful part of the entire work." He writes that "[o]nce the author gets into his story with St Paul and the founding of the church, the narrative becomes more interesting and fruitful. The great strength of the book is that it covers, in sufficient but not oppressive detail, huge areas of Christian history which are dealt with cursorily in traditional accounts of the subject... including the evolution of the early Christian sects, the Eastern Church in its entirety, the rise of Orthodoxy in both the Greek world and Russia" to the present throughout the world. So, "a commendable effort." Brian Van Hove, a Roman Catholic historian, criticised the book for various reasons including secular bias.

== Awards and honours ==
- 2010 Hessell-Tiltman Prize, which is for high literary merit but not primarily of academic achievement
- 2010 Cundill Prize in History, which is for promoting literary and academic achievement in history.

== See also ==
- A History of Christianity (TV series) (2009) presented by Diarmaid MacCulloch for the BBC
- Paul Johnson (1976). A History of Christianity. Touchstone Simon and Schuster ISBN 0-684-81503-6
- Reginald H. Fuller (1965). The Foundations of New Testament Christology, Scribners.
- John P. Meier (1991-2016). A Marginal Jew: Rethinking the Historical Jesus, v. 1-5. Anchor Bible Reference Library Series, Yale University Press.
