= The Dragon Has Two Tongues =

British television documentary series

The Dragon Has Two Tongues was a 13-part television series, broadcast in the UK in 1985 by HTV and Channel 4. It was about the history of Wales and was presented jointly by Gwyn Alf Williams and Wynford Vaughan-Thomas, and produced by Colin Thomas.

The series has been described as ground-breaking in terms of its length and subject matter but also in terms of its presentation, with two presenters representing opposing points of view, Williams being a Marxist historian and Vaughan-Thomas a journalist associated with the establishment. Gwyn Alf Williams' presentational style was described as "the most passionate and the most articulate about the importance of the past in understanding the present and anticipating the future". In his entry on Williams in the Dictionary of Welsh Biography, Geraint H. Jenkins wrote that "the fiery Marxist historian ran rings around his affable Whiggish co-presenter".

A copy of the recording is held in the archive of the National Library of Wales but it has not been repeated on UK television, despite a broadcast at a later date in Ireland. An attempt to post it online in 2017 was stopped by ITV Wales on copyright grounds, despite initially offering to sell the rights to the footage. In 2021 the Welsh Government was asked to preserve the series for future generations after ITV Wales had claimed that it could not be released in any format due to third-party copyright problems.

The title had been previously used by Glyn Jones in 1968 for his study of inter-war Welsh literature. The book emphasised the relationship between writers, their community and their language, and was the first academic study of Welsh writing in English. It was updated and re-issued several times and won the New Welsh Readers’ Poll in 2018 as the best essay collection ever published in English.

== Production ==
Colin Thomas was asked to produce, write and direct the series by HTV Wales, with Wynford Vaughan-Thomas already committed as sole presenter. Thomas realised when contemplating the series that his view of Welsh history did not align with Vaughan-Thomas's, and inspired by Colin MacArthur's book 'Television and History', he decided to add a second presenter. His first idea was the feminist historian Angela V. John but as Vaughan-Thomas would not accept John at any cost, Colin Thomas suggested Gwyn Williams, whom Vaughan-Thomas reluctantly accepted.
