= John C. Barrett =

British archaeologist and prehistorian (1949–2024)

John C. Barrett, FSA (1949 – 27 December 2024) was a British archaeologist and prehistorian who was Emeritus Professor of Archaeology at the Department of Archaeology, University of Sheffield. His research was primarily focussed on archaeological theory, European Prehistory from early agriculture to Romanisation, and the development of commercially funded archaeology in the UK. Barrett has been seen as an influential figure in the development of archaeological theory, critiques of archaeological practice, and British Prehistory.

== Education ==
Barrett's interest in archaeology came from encountering excavations at St Albans around the age of 12. He later graduated from the University of Wales (University College Cardiff).

== Academic career ==
=== Early positions and Fragments from Antiquity ===
Barrett first taught at the University of Leeds as a lecturer from 1976 and became a Senior Lecturer at the University of Glasgow in 1980. While at Glasgow, Barrett co-directed excavations and projects at major Prehistoric sites in Scotland, such as the Pitcarmick excavations in North East Perth. Barrett had contributed a section on Early Bronze Age hoards and metalwork to the 1985 book Symbols of Power: At the Time of Stonehenge, written by D.V. Clarke, T.G. Cowie and Andrew Foxon which had been published by the National Museum of Antiquities of Scotland. Barrett further wrote Fields of Discourse: Reconstituting a Social Archaeology in 1988 which continues to be an influential and revisited framework in modern archaeological practice.

In 1994, also during his tenure at Glasgow, Barrett wrote Fragments from Antiquity: An Archaeology of Social Life in Britain, 2900-1200 BC which became an influential text amongst archaeologists studying British prehistory. In the text, Barrett criticised the trend amongst processual archaeologists to focus on the generalisation of past societies into a series of processes, instead arguing that archaeologists should instead think about the individuals of the past, who are otherwise forgotten. He therefore accepts the role that post-processual theory plays in the book, but argued that "this is not a book about archaeological theory", and instead "an empirical study aimed at building a history of the period between about 2900 and 1200 BC in southern Britain".

=== Research and positions at the Department of Archaeology, University of Sheffield (1995 onward) ===
Barrett joined the Department of Archaeology at the University of Sheffield in 1995 and appointed to a chair in Archaeology in 2001. Barrett further acted as Head of Archaeology between 2002 and 2006, Dean of Arts (2007-2008), and Acting Head of Department of Biblical Studies (2009-2011). Additionally, Barrett was invited as a Visiting Professor to the University of Heidelberg in 2005.

From the mid-1990s until 2009, Barrett acted as a consultant on the Framework Archaeology project which provided archaeological services to BAA during the construction of Heathrow Terminal 5 and expansion of London Stanstead Airport in conjunction with Oxford Archaeology and Wessex Archaeology.

== Death ==
Barrett died on 27 December 2024.

== Select publications ==
- Barrett, J.C. (2013) "Genes and Agents: Closing the Theoretical Gap". In S. Bergerbrant & S. Sabatini (eds.) Counterpoint: Essays in Archaeology and heritage Studies in Honour of Professor Kristian Kristiansen. Oxford: Archaeopress, 575-582
- Barrett, J.C. (2013) "The Archaeology of Mind: It's not what you think", Cambridge Archaeological Journal 23(1), 1-17.
- Barrett, J.C. (2011) "The Neolithic Revolution: an ecological perspective", in Hadjikoumis A., Robinson E. & Viner S. (eds.) The dynamics of neolithisation in Europe: studies in honour of Andrew Sherratt. Oxford: Oxbow Books.
- Barrett, J.C. and Ko, I. (2009) "A Phenomenology of Landscape: a crisis in British Field Archaeology?", Journal of Social Archaeology. 9(3), 275-294
- Barrett, John. C.; Halstead, Paul, eds. (2004). The emergence of civilisation revisited. Oxford: Oxbow Books. ISBN 978-1842171660.
- Halstead, Paul; Barrett, John C., eds. (2004). Food, cuisine and society in prehistoric Greece. Oxford: Oxbow Books. ISBN 978-1842171677.
- Andrews, G.A., Barrett J.C. Lewis J.S.C. (2000) "Interpretation not record: the practice of archaeology". Antiquity 74, 525-30
- Barrett, J.C. (1994) Fragments from Antiquity: An Archaeology of Social Life in Britain, 2900-1200 BC
- Barrett, John C.; Bradley, Richard; Green, Martin (1991). Landscape, monuments, and society: the prehistory of Cranborne Chase. Cambridge: Cambridge University Press. ISBN 978-0521321280.
- Barrett, John C. (January 1988). "Fields of Discourse: Reconstituting a Social Archaeology". Critique of Anthropology. 7 (3): 5–16. doi:10.1177/0308275X8800700301. S2CID 142987820.
