= Fragments from Antiquity =

Book by John C. Barrett

- The paperback cover of the book.
- Author: John C. Barrett
- Language: English
- Subject: Archaeology
- Publisher: Blackwell
- Publication date: 1994
- Publication place: United Kingdom
- Media type: Print (Hardcover & Paperback)
- Pages: 172

Fragments from Antiquity: An Archaeology of Social Life in Britain, 2900-1200 BC is a book on the archaeology of Britain in the Late Neolithic and Early Bronze Ages written by the British archaeologist John C. Barrett, then a senior lecturer at the University of Glasgow. It was first published in 1994 by the Oxford-based company Blackwell as a part of their ‘Social Archaeology’ series, edited by the archaeologist Ian Hodder of the University of Cambridge.

An adherent of the post-processual school of thought in archaeological theory, in Fragments from Antiquity, Barrett eschews the 'grand narrative' approach which he associates with processualism, instead focusing in on the much smaller period of time between 2900 and 1200 BCE.

Although many of Barrett's interpretations of the evidence remained controversial, Fragments from Antiquity has remained an influential text amongst archaeologists studying British prehistory.

== Background ==
=== John C. Barrett ===
Barrett had contributed a section on Early Bronze Age hoards and metalwork to the 1985 book Symbols of Power: At the Time of Stonehenge, a work written by D.V. Clarke, T.G. Cowie and Andrew Foxon which had been published by the National Museum of Antiquities of Scotland.

== Synopsis ==
"A characteristic of modern archaeological writing is to avoid… intimacies. We produce more generalized histories, not of 'people' but of 'processes', which place this or any other life in a larger context of economic and settlement systems, or in the mechanisms of social evolution. These layers of generalization have the effect of finally burying the individual, a move in archaeological writing which creates an unbridgeable distance between our own images of the past and the subjective and local intimacies of people’s own lives as they were once lived."

— Barrett, in his Introduction, 1994.

In the book's introduction, Barrett criticises the trend amongst processual archaeologists to focus on the generalisation of past societies into a series of processes, instead arguing that archaeologists should instead think about the individuals of the past, who are otherwise forgotten. He therefore accepts the role that post-processual theory plays in the book, but argues that "this is not a book about archaeological theory", instead being "an empirical study aimed at building a history of the period between about 2900 and 1200 BC in southern Britain" a timespan that he considers to be "one of the most remarkable periods in European prehistory".
