= A History of the American People =

1997 book by Paul Johnson

- Cover of the first edition
- Author: Paul Johnson
- Cover artist: Mark Cohen
- Language: English
- Subject: History of the United States
- Publisher: Original Great Britain Edition Weidenfeld & Nicolson; HarperCollins
- Publication date: 1997 (original edition); 1999 (most recent edition)
- Publication place: United Kingdom
- Media type: Print (hardcover and paperback)
- Pages: 1088
- ISBN: 978-0-06-093034-9
- LC Class: E178.J675 1998

A History of the American People is a 1997 book about the history of the United States by the historian Paul Johnson. First published in Great Britain, it presents Johnson's view of American history from Colonial America to the end of the 20th century. The book is 1,088 pages long and has sold over 4 million copies worldwide. He started research in 1965, working on the book for 32 years.
