= Gwyn A. Williams =

Welsh historian

- Professor Gwyn A. Williams
- Born: Gwyn Alfred Williams; 30 September 1925; Dowlais, Wales
- Died: 16 November 1995 (aged 70); Dre-fach Felindre, Carmarthenshire, Wales
- Education: University College Wales, Aberystwyth
- Occupations: Professor, Historian, Presenter
- Writing career
- Language: English

Gwyn Alfred "Alf" Williams (30 September 1925 – 16 November 1995) was born in the iron town of Dowlais situated above the industrial town of Merthyr Tydfil in South Wales to Thomas John Williams and Gwladys Williams (née Morgan), who were left-wing schoolteachers. Williams became a Welsh historian who was particularly known for his work on the work of Italian Marxist Antonio Gramsci and of the Spanish painter Francisco Goya as well as on Welsh history.

== Life ==
Williams attended Cyfarthfa Grammar School in Merthyr Tydfil and later attended University College Wales, Aberystwyth, where he read history. During World War II, he joined the British Army and fought in Normandy. Williams received his doctorate for a dissertation later published as Medieval London: from commune to capital. He was a communist, a member of the Young Communist League of Britain in his youth and he was the first historian to publish an analysis in English on Antonio Gramsci.

== Career ==
In 1954, Williams was appointed Lecturer in Welsh History at Aberystwyth University where he worked with another historian of Wales David Williams. He left Aberystwyth for the University of York where he was Chair of History from 1965 to 1974. He moved back to Wales in 1974, becoming Professor of History at University College Cardiff, where he stayed until his retirement in 1983. Throughout his career, Williams was known as an exciting lecturer, capable of drawing large crowds from across the university. After his retirement, he continued to write, but he focused more and more on television and film, presenting, with Wynford Vaughan-Thomas, a 13-part series in 1985 by HTV and Channel 4 on Welsh history entitled The Dragon Has Two Tongues.

Williams was also a supporter of Republicanism. He was later a member of Plaid Cymru. And he praised the anti-monarchy book The Enchanted Glass by Tom Nairn. In 1983 he took early retirement from his chair at Cardiff and began making films with Teliesyn, an independent Welsh broadcasting company based in Cardiff. In 1985 he had published his book When Was Wales?, which followed his earlier study of the history of the Welsh working class) and which compatriot Meic Stephens described as 'perhaps his most influential work.' Williams eventually moved from Cardiff to the village of Dre-fach Felindre in Carmarthenshire, West Wales where on 16 November 1995 he died.

== Awards ==
=== Fellowships etc ===
- David Davies Open Scholarship, University of Wales, Aberystwyth, 1943.
- Dr Samuel Williams Studenship, University of Wales, 1950.
- Fellowship of the University of Wales, 1952.
- Goldsmiths' Company's Post-Graduate Research Studenship, University College London, 1952.
- Alexis Aladin Russia Scholarship, University College of Wales, Aberystwyth, 1960.
- Simon Research Fellowship, University of Manchester, 1961.
- American Council of Learned Societies Fellowship, University of Pennsylvania, 1966.
- John Carter Brown Library Fellowship, Brown University, 1966.
- Visiting Fellowship, St Anthony's College, Oxford, 1970.

=== Prizes ===
- Alun Lews Memorial Essay Prize, University College of Wales, Aberystwyth, 1949.
- Dr Joseph Hamwee Graduate Prize, University College of Wales, Aberystwyth, 1950.
- Alexander Prize, Royal Historical Society, 1960.
- Welsh Arts Council Prizes: for Goya; 1977 for The Merthyr Rising, 1979.

== Tributes ==
Williams received many tributes upon his death. A festschrift for him was published in 1985. In 1996 Welsh historian Geraint H. Jenkins paid tribute to him. In 1998 Stephens observed:

'More than anyone of his generation Gwyn A. Williams infused scholarly history with immediate concerns, and his books, in range and content, reflect both his noted particularity and his international perspective.'

== Selected publications ==
A bibliography of Williams' work is available.

=== 1960s ===
- Mediaval London. Abingdon, Oxfordshire: Routledge. 2007 [originally 1963]. ISBN 0-415-41833-X.
- Artisans and sans-culottes Popular movements in France and Britain during the French Revolution (Second revised ed.). London: Libris. 1988 [originally 1968].

=== 1970s ===
- Proletarian order Antonio Gramsci, factory councils and the origins of Italian communism, 1911-1921. London: Pluto Press. 1975. ISBN 0 902818 65 1.
- "The making and unmaking of Antonion Gramsci". New Edinburgh Review. 27 (3): 7-15. 1975.
- Spriano, Paolo (1975). "Translator's Introduction". L'Occupazione delle fabbriche [The occupation of the factories: Italy 1920] (in Italian). Translated by Williams, Gwyn A. London: Pluto Press.
- The Merthyr Rising (Second ed.). Cardiff: University of Wales Press. 2013 [originally 1978]. ISBN 9781783160051.
- Madoc The Making of a Myth. Oxford: Oxford University Press. 1987 [originally 1979]. ISBN 0192851780.

=== 1980s ===
- The Search for Beulah Land. London: Routledge. 2022 [originally 1980]. ISBN 9781032271941.
- The Welsh in their History. London: Routledge. 2022 [originally 1982]. ISBN 9781032273006.

=== 1990s ===
- "With the history left in John Davies's New History of Wales". Planet. 82 (August/September). 1990.
- Excalibur The Search for Arthur. London: B.B.C. Books. 1994. ISBN 0563370203.
- Fishers of Men - Stories Towards an Autobiography. Llandysul: Gomer Press. 1996. ISBN 1859023274.
