= Lloyd Laing (archaeologist) =

Lloyd Laing (born 1944, Lanark, Scotland) is an archaeologist and ancient art historian specializing in early medieval Britain and Ireland, coins, and ceramics. He has published over 30 books and 60 papers, as well as many contributions to encyclopedias and magazines, either individually or jointly. He has directed many excavations in different parts of Britain. His wife, Jennifer Laing, is also an archaeologist.

He studied prehistoric archaeology and fine art at Edinburgh University before becoming assistant inspector of ancient monuments for Scotland from 1966 to 1969. He was a senior lecturer at the University of Liverpool and then the University of Nottingham, where he was later associate professor.

== Publications ==
BOOKS

Published as sole author

1. European Influence on Celtic Art: Artists and Patrons, Four Courts Press, Dublin, 248 pp, (2010).

2. The Archaeology of Celtic Britain and Ireland, c. 400-1200 AD, Cambridge University Press, 406 pp, (2006).

3. Pottery in Britain 4000 BC to AD 1900, Greenlight Publishing, Witham, 133 pp, (2003).

4. Later Celtic Art in Britain and Ireland, Shire Books, Aylesbury, 64 pp, 44 plates (1997, 2nd rev. ed.,1st pub 1987).

5. Celtic Britain, Routledge & Kegan Paul, London, & Scribners, New York. Also-Granada, London, ( PaIadin paperback), 197 pp, (1979)

6. Ancient Scotland, David & Charles, Newton Abbot & David & Charles Holdings, North Pomfret, VT., 144 pp. 12 figs, 13 Plates, (1976).

7. Archaeology of Late Celtic Britain and Ireland, c.400 - 1200 AD, Methuen & Co (Handbooks of Archaeology) London & Harper & Row, New York, 451 pp, 155 figs, 32 Pls, (1975).

8. Orkney and Shetland, an Archaeological Guide, David & Charles, Newton Abbot & David & Charles Holdings, North Pomfret, VT., 263 pp,72 figs, 16 pls, (1974).

9. Coins and Archaeology, Weidenfeld & Nicolson, London, & Shocken, New York, 336 pp, 28 pls, 44 figs, 16 maps, (1969).

As Joint author

1. Early English Art and Architecture, Alan Sutton, Stroud, 246 pp, illus, (1996). Co-author J Laing.

2. Medieval Britain: The Age of Chivalry, Herbert Press, London & St Martin's Press, New York, (1995), 224 pp, illus (rev. eds.1998). Co-author J Laing.

3. Britain's European Heritage, Alan Sutton, Stroud, 190 pp, 14 pls., 17 figs, (1995). Co-author J Laing.

4. Celtic Britain and Ireland. Art and Society, Herbert Press, London, 224 pp. illus, (1995). Co-author J Laing.

5. The Picts and the Scots, Alan Sutton, Stroud, 172 pp, 136 illus., (1993, rev.ed. 2001). Co-author J Laing.

6. Ancient Art. The challenge to Modern Thought, Irish Academic Press, Dublin, St Martin's Press, New York, 270 pp., (1993). Co-author J Laing.

7. Art of the Celts, Thames & Hudson, London, 216 pp.,.(1992). Co-author J Laing.

8. Celtic Britain and Ireland. c.200-800 AD, Irish Academic Press, Dublin, and St Martin's Press, New York, 263 pp, (1990). Co-author J Laing.

9. Dark Age Remains in Britain, London, Constable & Co, 318 pp, 96 plates, (1979). Co-author J Laing.

10. Origins of Britain, Routledge & Kegan Paul, London & Scribners, New York, 107 pp, 110 plates, Also London, (1980) & Granada (Paladin paperbacks),(1982).Co-author J Laing.

11. Anglo-Saxon England, Routledge & Kegan Paul, London & Scribners, New York,(1979), 195 pp, 111 plates. Also London, Granada (Paladin paperbacks), (1982). Co-author J Laing.

MONOGRAPHS

1. The Mote of Mark, a Dark Age Citadel in South-West Scotland, Oxford, Oxbow, 189 pp, (2006). Co-author D Longley.

2. A Catalogue of Celtic Ornamental Metalwork in the British Isles. c.400 -1200 AD, Oxford & Nottingham, Tempus Reparatvm (BAR Brit Ser 229), 120 pp' (1991).

3. The Dark Ages of West Cheshire, Chester, Cheshire County Council Monographs, 6 (1985), 67 pp, Co-author J Laing.

4. Excavations at Hest Bank, Lancashire, LiverpoolUniversity, Dept of History pubs. (1984), 12 pp.

5. Studies in Celtic Survival, (as Editor), Oxford, British Archaeological reports 37, (1977), 123 pp

6. Settlement Types in Post-Roman Scotland, Oxford, British Archaeological Reports 13, (1975), 46 pp.

7. Some Iron Age Mediterranean Imports in England, Oxford, British Archaeological Reports 5, 39 pp, Co-author P Harbison.

8. Distribution of Terra Nigra in Britain, Southampton, City Museum Pubs 6, (with G Rogers), (1966), 48 pp.
