= The Reformation: A History =

2003 history book by Diarmaid MacCulloch

- Author: Diarmaid MacCulloch
- Language: English
- Subject: Protestant Reformation
- Publication date: 2003
- Publication place: United Kingdom
- Media type: Print
- Pages: xxvii + 832 (UK), xxiv + 792 (US)
- ISBN: 978-0-14-028534-5
- Dewey Decimal: 270.6 (US)
- LC Class: BR305.3M33

The Reformation: A History is a 2003 history book by the English historian Diarmaid MacCulloch. It is a survey of the European Reformation between 1490 and 1700. It won the 2003 Wolfson History Prize (UK) and the 2004 National Book Critics Circle Award (US).

== Editions ==
English-language editions:

- Reformation: Europe's House Divided (Paperback). Penguin Books Ltd (2 September 2004). ISBN 978-0-14-028534-5
- Reformation: Europe's House Divided 1490–1700 (Hardcover). Allen Lane (30 September 2004). ISBN 978-0-7139-9370-7 (UK edition).
- The Reformation: A History (Hardcover). Viking Adult (3 May 2004). ISBN 978-0-670-03296-9 (US edition)
- The Reformation (Hardcover). Viking Books (June 2004). ISBN 978-0-670-03296-9 (UK edition)
- The Reformation (Paperback). Penguin (Non-Classics); Reprint edition (25 March 2005). ISBN 978-0-14-303538-1 (US edition)
- The Reformation (Paperback). Penguin Books; Reprint edition (May 2005). ISBN 978-0-14-303538-1 (UK edition).
- Reformation: Europe's House Divided 1490–1700 (Hardcover). The Folio Society (2013).
