= Modern Times: A History of the World from the 1920s to the 1980s =

1983 book by Paul Johnson

- Cover of the first edition
- Author: Paul Johnson
- Language: English
- Subject: 20th century politics and culture
- Publisher: Weidenfeld & Nicolson
- Publication date: 1983
- Publication place: United Kingdom
- Media type: Print (Hardcover and Paperback)
- Pages: 882 (1999 edition)
- ISBN: 0-75380-826-9 (1999 edition)

Modern Times: A History of the World from the 1920s to the 1980s is a book by British journalist and writer Paul Johnson, who gives an outline of world history during the 20th century from a conservative perspective. It was cited in National Review as one of the top ten books that changed North America and is described as a book that has "influenced intellectual thinking on a profound level". It was first published in 1983 and has since been reissued and updated.

== Summary ==
Johnson describes world history beginning with the aftermath of World War I, and ending with the collapse of Communism in Eastern Europe.

In the first part of the book, Johnson deals mainly with the shaping of the Soviet Union in the first decades after World War I, the collapse of democracy in Central Europe due to the rise of Fascism and National Socialism, the causes that led to World War II, and its development and outcome. He devotes a chapter ("An Infernal Theocracy, a Celestial Chaos") to the development of Imperial Japan and the chaotic situation within China during the Warlord Era.

In roughly the second half of the book, Johnson deals with the post-World War II events: the Cold War, the end of colonialism and the simultaneous birth of the Third World concept, the rise of the People's Republic of China and of independent India, the reconstruction and economic boom in post-war Europe, and the rise of the East Asian Tigers.
