= Elizabeth Cowling =

American cellist, musicologist and professor

- Born: 1910
- Died: 1997 (aged 86–87)

Elizabeth Cowling (1910 – 18 February 1997) was an American cellist, musicologist, music historian and teacher.

== Life ==
Cowling earned a Master’s degree in Cello Performance from Northwestern University, where she also received a Ph.D. in Music History and Literature in 1960. Her dissertation was titled "The Italian Sonata Literature for the Violincello in the Baroque Era", later published in 1967. Before pursuing the cello in higher education, Cowling had first earned a Bachelor’s in Philosophy from Carleton College, a liberal arts college in her hometown of Northfield, Minnesota, and then a Master’s in Economics from Columbia University.

Cowling taught as a professor and cello teacher at the University of North Carolina Greensboro for 31 years, from 1945 to 1976 when she retired. It was here that she established the largest archival collection of cello music-related material in the world, founding the University of North Carolina Greensboro Cello Music Collection. This was first the amalgamation of her extensive collection of manuscripts, sheet music and publications, with material from the Silva Cello Music Library. Cowling is credited with encouraging the acquisition of approximately 1,775 scores and thirteen boxes of archival material by the Friends of the Library at UNC Greensboro, from the family of the renowned Italian cellist, Luigi Silva, in 1963, following his death in 1961. This collection continued to grow, and today the university's special collections holds cello-related material from ten notable cellists, including Rudolf Matz, János Scholz, Maurice Eisenberg and Cowling's own personal collection.

In 1975, Cowling published The Cello with Scribner. At the time, the book was described as the most comprehensive biography of the cello to ever have been written, and it showcased Cowling’s research in the anatomy, making, and history of the instrument from its beginnings in the fifteenth century to modern day.

== Career ==
In 1929, Cowling travelled to Europe to study the cello, first in Paris with Paul Bazelaire, and then with Mischa Schnieder in Budapest. She also briefly learned with Pablo Casals in 1950. She continued to travel across America and Europe throughout her career, collecting photocopies of manuscripts, sheet music and other papers as she went.

In 1945, Cowling began teaching at the University of North Carolina Greensboro (formerly the Women’s College until 1963) as assistant professor in its School of Music. She first met Luigi Silva at Eastman College of Music in Rochester, New York, where he was teaching in 1946. This began a life long connection between Cowling and Silva, leading to her support of University of North Carolina Greensboro purchasing Silva's collection in 1963. It was also her research of these materials, among many others she collected throughout her career, that were the impetus to Cowling writing The Cello, in 1975, described in a review as "surely a labor of love, filled with personal experiences and reflections".

After retiring in 1976, Cowling donated approximately 1,050 cello-related items to the university's special collections in 1977, many of which were photocopies of manuscripts she encountered while researching across the US and Europe.

Cowling died on 18 February 1997 in Greensboro, North Carolina, at the age of 86. In her will, she left UNC Greensboro $190,000, part of which was used to continue developing the Cello Music Collections online database.
