= Rees Davies =

Welsh historian (1938–2005)

Sir Rees Davies CBE FBA FRHistS
- Born: Robert Rees Davies; 6 August 1938; Merionethshire, Wales
- Died: 16 May 2005 (aged 66); Oxford, England
- Occupation: Historian

Academic background
- Education: University of Oxford
- Thesis: The Lancaster and Bohun lordships in Wales in the 14th and early 15th centuries (1965)
- Doctoral advisor: K. B. McFarlane

Sir Robert Rees Davies (6 August 1938 – 16 May 2005) was a Welsh historian.

== Biography ==
Davies was born near Llandderfel, Merionethshire, and educated at Bala Grammar School. He was bilingual in Welsh and English. He received a First in his degree from University College London in 1959, later returning there as a lecturer in 1963. In 1959, he undertook a two-year postgraduate study of the Duchy of Lancaster's Welsh lordships in the later Middle Ages at Merton College, Oxford under the supervision of K. B. McFarlane.

In 1966, Davies married Carys Lloyd Wynne, with whom he had one son and one daughter.

In 1975, Davies was appointed professor of history at University College of Wales, Aberystwyth. His 1987 book Conquest, Coexistence and Change: Wales 1063–1415 won him the Wolfson Literary Award for History. In 1992 he became president of the Royal Historical Society.

In 1995, Davies was appointed the Chichele Professor of Medieval History at the University of Oxford and made a fellow of All Souls College. From 1995 to 2005, he served as chairman of the Ancient Monuments Board for Wales. Davies was appointed a Knight Bachelor for services to history in the Queen's 2005 New Year Honours.

Davies is best known for his reinvigoration of Welsh medieval scholarship and as a pioneer in the study of British history, rejecting earlier Anglo-centric treatments of the medieval histories of Britain and Ireland.

Davies died of cancer in Oxford, aged 66.

== Works ==
- 1978 Lordship and Society in the March of Wales, 1282–1400 (Oxford: Clarendon Press)
- 1984 Welsh Society and Nationhood: Historical Essays Presented to Glanmor Williams, jointly edited (Cardiff: University of Wales Press ISBN 0708308600)
- 1987 Conquest, Coexistence, and Change: Wales, 1063–1415, part of the Oxford History of Wales (Oxford: Clarendon Press)
- 1987 Wales: the Age Of Conquest, 1063–1415
- 1988 The British Isles, 1100–1500: Comparisons, Contrasts, and Connections (Edinburgh: J. Donald Publishers)
- 1990 Domination and Conquest: the Experience of Ireland, Scotland and Wales, 1100–1300 (Cambridge and New York: Cambridge University Press)
- 1995 The Revolt of Owain Glyn Dŵr (Oxford and New York: Oxford University Press ISBN 0198205082)
- 2000 The Age of Conquest: Wales, 1063–1415 (Oxford and New York: Oxford University Press)
- 2000 The First English Empire: Power and Identities in the British Isles: 1093–1343 (Oxford and New York: Oxford University Press)
- 2002 Owain Glyn Dwr: trwy ras Duw, Tywysog Cymru (Talybont, Ceredigion: Y Lolfa, in Welsh) ISBN 9780862436254
  - English translation by Gerald Morgan: Owain Glyndwr: Prince of Wales (Talybont, Ceredigion: Y Lolfa, 2009) ISBN 9781847711274
- 2004 From Medieval to Modern Wales: Historical Essays in Honour of Kenneth O. Morgan and Ralph A. Griffiths, edited with Geraint H. Jenkins, (Cardiff: University of Wales Press)
- 2009 Lords and Lordship in the British Isles in the Late Middle Ages, edited by Brendan Smith, (Oxford: Oxford University Press) ISBN 9780199542918

Academic offices
Preceded by Francis Michael Longstreth Thompson	President of the Royal Historical Society; 1993–1997	Succeeded by Peter Marshall
