= John Davies (historian) =

Welsh historian and television and radio broadcaster (1938–2015)

John Davies FLSW
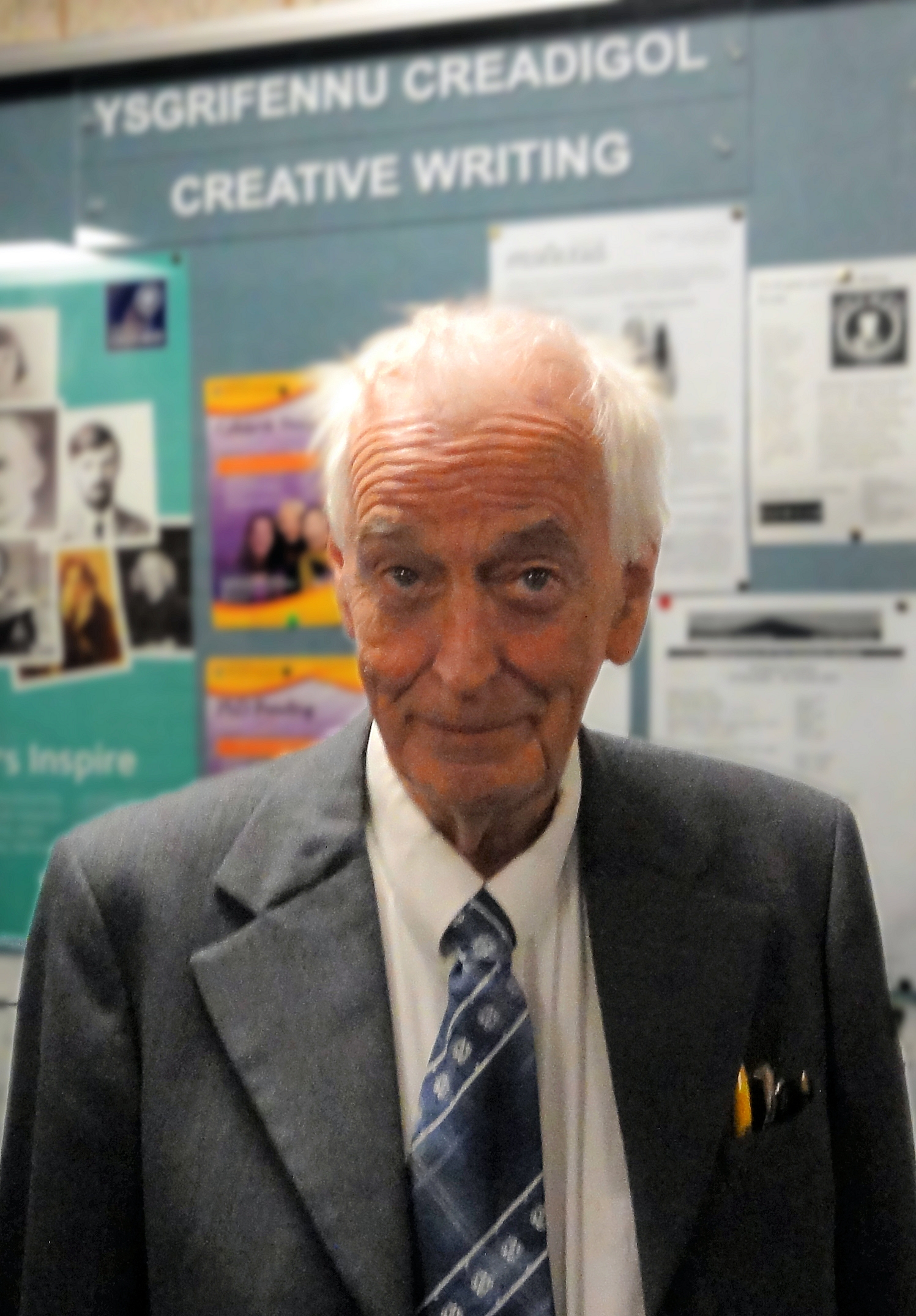
- Born: 25 April 1938; Treorchy, Wales
- Died: 16 February 2015 (aged 76); Cardiff, Wales
- Occupations: Historian and academic
- Children: 4 (including Anna Brychan)
- Awards: Glyndŵr Award (2005); Wales Book of the Year (2010)

Academic background
- Education: University College, Cardiff; Trinity College, Cambridge

Academic work
- Discipline: History
- Sub-discipline: Welsh history; Social history; Political history
- Institutions: Swansea University; Aberystwyth University
- Notable works: A History of Wales (1990)

John Davies (25 April 1938 – 16 February 2015) was a Welsh historian and a television and radio broadcaster. He attended university at Cardiff and Cambridge and taught Welsh at Aberystwyth. He wrote a number of books on Welsh history, including A History of Wales (Hanes Cymru in Welsh).

== Education ==
Davies was born in the Rhondda, Wales, and studied at both University College, Cardiff, and Trinity College, Cambridge.

== Life and work ==
Davies was married with four children. In later life he acknowledged that he was bisexual. After teaching Welsh history at Swansea University and Aberystwyth University, he retired to Cardiff, and appeared frequently as a presenter and contributor to history programmes on television and radio.

In the mid-1980s, Davies was commissioned to write a concise history of Wales by Penguin Books to add to its Pelican series of the histories of nations. The decision by Penguin to commission the volume in Welsh was "unexpected and highly commendable," wrote Davies. The Welsh version is titled Hanes Cymru, whilst the English version is titled A History of Wales.

"I seized the opportunity to write of Wales and the Welsh. When I had finished, I had a typescript which was almost three times larger than the original commission," wrote Davies. The original voluminous typescript was first published in hardback under the Allen Lane imprint. Davies took a sabbatical from his post at the University College of Wales and wrote most of the chapters while touring Europe. Davies dedicated Hanes Cymru to his wife, Janet Mackenzie Davies.

Hanes Cymru was translated into English and published in 1993, as there was "a demand among English-speakers to read what was already available to Welsh-speakers," wrote Davies. A revised edition was published (in both languages) in 2007.

In 2005, Davies received the Glyndŵr Award for an Outstanding Contribution to the Arts in Wales during the Machynlleth Festival. He won the 2010 Wales Book of the Year for Cymru: Y 100 lle i'w gweld cyn marw.

In 2011, Davies was elected as a Fellow of the Learned Society of Wales.

Davies lived in Grangetown, Cardiff, for which he coined the Welsh-language name Trelluest. To mark his 75th birthday in 2013, the Welsh-language television channel S4C broadcast a programme, Gwirionedd y Galon: Dr John Davies, about his life and his home and in 2014 published his autobiography in Welsh.

Davies died at the age of 76 in 2015 and, as a tribute to his longstanding friend, Jon Gower republished Davies' autobiography in English. He had four children including Anna Brychan, who was elected as Plaid Cymru Member of the Senedd for Caerdydd Penarth in May 2026.

== Works ==
- Cardiff and the Marquesses of Bute (Writers of Wales), University of Wales Press, January 1980, ISBN 0-7083-0761-2
- A History of Wales, Penguin, 1994, ISBN 0-14-014581-8 (Revised edition 2007, ISBN 0-14-028475-3)
- Broadcasting and the BBC in Wales, University of Wales Press, 1994, ISBN 978-0708312735
- The Making of Wales, The History Press, 2nd edition printing: Oct 1, 2009, ISBN 0-7524-5241-X
- The Celts, Cassell & Co, 2000 ISBN 0-304-35590-9, based upon the S4C documentary series The Celts
- The Welsh Academy Encyclopaedia of Wales, University of Wales Press, April 17, 2008, ISBN 0-7083-1953-X
- Wales: 100 Places to See Before You Die (with Marian Delyth), Y Lolfa, 2010, ISBN 978-1847713087
- Fy Hanes I: Hunangofiant (autobiography in Welsh), Y Lolfa, 2014, ISBN 978-1847719850
- A Life in History (autobiography translated into English by Jon Gower), Y Lolfa, 2015, ISBN 978-1784612177
