= A History of Christianity (TV series) =

Television series

- DVD cover
- Genre: Documentary
- Presented by: Diarmaid MacCulloch
- Country of origin: United Kingdom
- Original language: English
- No. of series: 1
- No. of episodes: 6

Production
- Running time: 60 mins

Original release
- Network: BBC Four
- Release: 5 November – 10 December 2009

A History of Christianity is a six-part British television series originally broadcast on BBC Four in 2009. The series was presented by the English ecclesiastical historian Diarmaid MacCulloch, Professor of the History of the Church at the University of Oxford.

== Overview ==
The aim of the BBC network was to produce "a new 'landmark' series which will examine the origins of Christianity and the relevance of the faith in the modern world". Presented by the English ecclesiastical historian Diarmaid MacCulloch, Professor of the History of the Church at the University of Oxford, the series considers the historical development of the Christian religion since its inception in the 1st century to the contemporary era, and its four main forms: Eastern Orthodoxy, Oriental Christianity, Roman Catholicism, and Protestantism.

== Episodes ==
#	Title	Directed and produced by	Original release date
1	"The First Christianity"	Gillian Bancroft	5 November 2009
Details how the origins of Christianity lie east of Jerusalem and Rome.
2	"Catholicism: The Unpredictable Rise of Rome"	Sian Salt	12 November 2009
Explores the rise of Roman Catholic Church.
3	"Orthodoxy: From Empire to Empire"	Sian Salt	19 November 2009
Explores Eastern Orthodox Christianity's fight for survival.
4	"Reformation: The Individual Before God"	Gillian Bancroft	26 November 2009
Looks at the Protestant Reformation and its attack on the Roman Catholic Church.
5	"Protestantism: The Evangelical Explosion"	Gillian Bancroft	3 December 2009
Traces the growth of Evangelical Protestantism across the globe.
6	"God in the Dock"	Sian Salt	10 December 2009
Examines the concept of scepticism in Western Christianity.

== Merchandising ==
A book written by Diarmaid MacCulloch, published in September 2009 and covering the same topic, is available:

- MacCulloch, Diarmaid (2009). A History of Christianity: The First Three Thousand Years (1st ed.). London and New York: Penguin Books. ISBN 978-0-7139-9869-6. OCLC 2009379999.

The series was released on DVD on 1 February 2010 with the title A History of Christianity.
