= A History of Christianity (Johnson book) =

1976 book by Paul Johnson

- Cover of the first edition
- Author: Paul Johnson
- Language: English
- Subject: History of Christianity
- Published: 1976
- Publication place: United Kingdom
- Media type: Print
- Pages: viii, 556 p. (1995 Touchstone edition)
- ISBN: 0-684-81503-6
- Dewey Decimal: 270-9002

A History of Christianity is a 1976 study of the history of Christianity by the British historian Paul Johnson. It has since been reissued and updated. The author aims to present a comprehensive factual history of the Christian religion.

== Contents ==
In the Prologue, Johnson writes:

"During these two millennia Christianity has, perhaps, proved more influential in shaping human destiny than any other institutional philosophy, but there are now signs that its period of predominance is drawing to a close, thereby inviting a retrospect and a balance sheet.... Christianity is essentially a historical religion. It bases its claims on the historical facts it asserts. If these are demolished it is nothing.... A Christian with faith has nothing to fear from the facts."

The narrative begins with Paul of Tarsus making his way from Antioch to Jerusalem, probably in 49 AD, to meet with the remaining followers of Jesus.

Chapters include:

- Part 1. The Rise and Rescue of the Jesus Sect (50 BC to 250 AD)]. Discusses Roman Judeo cultural world, Council of Jerusalem, Essenes, John the Baptist, textual evidence of Jesus, the ministry and teachings of Jesus, his crucifixion and post-resurrection appearances, the rise of the Church, Paul, the Zealots and their alliance with the Christians (unlike S. G. F. Brandon, Johnson didn't think that the historical Jesus was a political revolutionary influenced by the Zealots but is also sceptical about the flight to Pella), the Fall of Jerusalem, Valentinius, Marcion, Irenaeus, Tertullian, Origen, coming predominance of Roman Church and the bishop of Rome.
- Part 2. From Martyrs to Inquisitors (250 AD to 450 AD) – Diocletian's persecution, Constantine's conversion, first official Church, Arianism, Pelagianism, Jerome, Ambrose, Augustine.
- Part 3. Mitred Lords and Crowned Ikons (450 AD to 1054 AD) – Fall of the Western Roman Empire, Dark Age Christianity, monasticism, Christian relics, rise of Papacy, Carolingian age, Eastern Orthodox Church.
- Part 4. The Total Society and its Enemies (1054 AD to 1500 AD) – Height of Papacy, Middle Age theology, total Christian society, paying for Penance, corruption of Church, Crusades, millenarian revolts, Innocent III, Francis of Assisi.
- Part 5. The Third Force (1500 AD to 1648 AD) – Reformation and Counter-Reformation, with an emphasis on Erasmus.
- Part 6. Faith, Reason and Unreason (1648 AD to 1870 AD) – Christianity's conflict with the Enlightenment, beginning of retreat of total Christian Society, Pascal, Voltaire, Protestantism, French Revolution, rerise of the Papacy.
- Part 7. Almost Chosen Peoples (1500 AD to 1910 AD) – Christian missionaries, conversion of Latin America, East Asian Christianity, Francis Xavier, Alessandro Valignano, persecution of Japanese Christianity, American Christianity, 19th century missionary work, African Christianity.
- Part 8. The Nadir of Triumphalism (1870 AD to 1975 AD) – Modern Papacy, Modernity, Nazism, Christianity and World War II, decline of the Church in the West, Second Vatican Council, Humanae vitae.

Part 8 closes by discussing the possible ending of the millennial-long East-West Schism. How far the ending of schisms within Christianity will go is to be seen. "[T]he argument about the control of the Christian Church is almost as old as Christianity itself; and it may be that it will continue so long as there are men and women who assert that Christ was God, and who await the parousia. Perhaps it is part of the providential plan that the organization of Christianity should be a perpetual source of discord. Who can say? We should remember the words of Saint Paul, towards the end of his letter to the Romans, the key document of the faith: 'O depth of wealth, wisdom, and knowledge in God. How unsearchable his judgments, how untraceable his ways. Who knows the mind of the Lord? Who has been his counsellor?'"(p. 514)

The Epilogue focuses on the papacy of John Paul II, his role in the fall of Communism, the Post-Soviet recovery of the Russian Orthodox Church; and describes the history of Christianity as a matrix for "a constant process of struggle and rebirth – a succession of crises, often accompanied by horror, bloodshed, bigotry and unreason but [with] evidence too of growth, vitality and increased understanding." The book "has necessarily stressed [Christianity's] failures and shortcomings, and its institutional distortions" but in the context of "its stupendous claims and its unprecedented idealism."(p. 515–16) Johnson argues that Christianity is self-correcting, with an "outstanding moral merit to invest the individual with a conscience, and bid him to follow it." "[I]t is thus no accident that all the implantations of freedom throughout the world have ultimately a Christian origin."(p. 516) Indeed, "Europe was a Christian creation not only in essence but in minute detail."(p. 515) The apotheosis that Christianity has provided, Johnson writes, "has reflected an effort to rise above our frailties... [and, to] that extent, the chronicle of Christianity is an edifying one."(p. 517)

== Reception ==
Malcolm Muggeridge, writing in the New Statesman, describes the book as "masterly... [combining] great wealth of scholarship... with a vigorous, confident style."

Alan Brien in The Sunday Times called it "vivid, colourful, clear and often at once impassioned and witty", a history "not be left to students and scholars" and "a treat for the general reader."

Richard Marius in The Christian Century writes that "Paul Johnson, an English Roman Catholic, has given us the best one-volume history of Christianity ever done."

A Kirkus Reviews review characterizes Johnson as avoiding "all special theological pleading and abid[ing] by professional canons of evidence and objectivity." In fact, "he accents the conflicts, shortcomings, and institutional distortions and thereby effectively counters the homogenized interpretations of much orthodox church history." The book is termed "a bold achievement of compression and analysis."

W.H.C. Frend's New York Review of Books review "Christians vs. Christians" described it as "brilliantly, if somberly and sometimes even wrongheadedly, told" and "a tour de force, one of the most ambitious surveys of the history of Christianity ever attempted and perhaps the most radical."

Martin E. Marty's New York Times review of the book in October 1976 asserts that "whether one can represent Christianity in only 556 pages becomes pedantic and frivolous in the face of the fact that Paul Johnson has successfully done so." After Johnson's brief description of Jesus preaching the coming Kingdom of God, his death, and his followers' belief in Jesus's resurrection, Marty writes "along comes Paul,... the fanatic fool for Christ," and, for Johnson, "the greatest Christian," who "rescued Jesusism from its place among the more crabby Jewish sects of the day, picked up its hints of universal intent and then wrenched the faith and himself into a context where the 'salvation mechanism' is available for all people." Near the end, the review describes the book as "a reliable if hard-edged story of the public church."

Donald Cantuar in Churchman (1977) expresses deep appreciation to Johnson's "tour de force", as for example in his estimation of Paul's impact: "The truth is that Paul did not invent Christianity. Or pervert it; he rescued it from extinction. Paul was the first pure Christian: the first to comprehend Jesus’s system of theology, to grasp the magnitude of the changes it embodied, and the completeness of the break with Judaic law." (p. 35)

Colin Gunton's review in Religious Studies describes the book as "long and enthralling", though it recounts reasons of state "encompass[ing] in the name of religion the subversion of the truth" for much of Christian history. He characterizes Johnson's view of Augustine of Hippo "as the villain of the story" and Paul and Erasmus as its heroes. This follows from the Augustinian account as a "total Christian society," necessarily implying a "compulsory society." (p. 242) Johnson contrasts that account with the Pauline theology of truth and human rebirth and the Erasmian view of Christianity as in "full alliance with the Renaissance," including a distaste for persecution and oppression. The review cites Johnson's argument for Erasmus and Paul as providing pedigree of principles for the American Revolution and the Founding Fathers when "for the first time since the Dark Ages a society came into existence in which institutional Christianity was associated with progress and freedom rather than against them."(p. 428)

== See also ==
- Diarmaid MacCulloch (2009). A History of Christianity: The First Three Thousand Years
