= Paul Johnson (writer) =

British writer and journalist (1928–2023)

Paul Johnson CBE
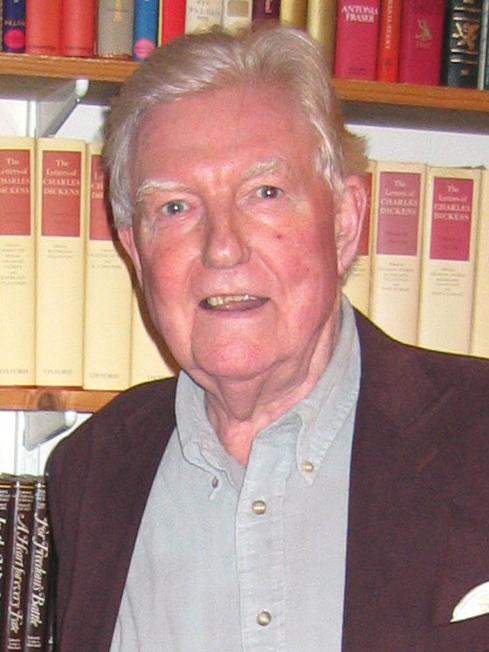
- Johnson in March 2005
- Born: Paul Bede Johnson; 2 November 1928; Manchester, Lancashire, England
- Died: 12 January 2023 (aged 94); London, England
- Education: Stonyhurst College; Magdalen College, Oxford
- Occupations: Journalist; popular historian
- Known for: Editor of the New Statesman (1965–1970)
- Spouse: Marigold Hunt (m. 1958)
- Children: 4, including Daniel and Luke
- Website: pauljohnsonarchives.org

Paul Bede Johnson CBE (2 November 1928 – 12 January 2023) was a British journalist, popular historian, speechwriter and author. Although associated with the political left in his early career, he became a popular conservative historian.

Johnson was educated at the Jesuit independent school Stonyhurst College, and at Magdalen College, Oxford, where he studied history. He first came to prominence in the 1950s as a journalist writing for and later editing the New Statesman magazine. A prolific writer, Johnson wrote more than 50 books and contributed to numerous magazines and newspapers. His sons include the journalist Daniel Johnson, founder of Standpoint magazine, and the businessman Luke Johnson, former chairman of Channel 4.

== Early life and education ==
Johnson was born in Manchester, England, on 2 November 1928. His father, William Aloysius Johnson, was an artist and principal of the Art School in Burslem, Stoke-on-Trent, Staffordshire. At Stonyhurst College, Johnson received an education grounded in the Jesuit method, which he preferred over the more secularised curriculum used at the University of Oxford.

Johnson attended the University of Oxford, where he was tutored by the historian A. J. P. Taylor, and was a member of the exclusive Stubbs Society.

== Career ==
=== British Army ===
After graduating with a second-class honours degree, Johnson performed his national service in the British Army, joining the King's Royal Rifle Corps and then the Royal Army Educational Corps, where he was commissioned as a captain (acting) based mainly in Gibraltar. Here he saw the "grim misery and cruelty of the Franco regime".

Johnson's military record led the Paris periodical Réalités to hire him, where he was assistant editor from 1952 to 1955. He adopted a left-wing political outlook during this period as he witnessed in May 1952 the police response to a riot in Paris (Communists were rioting over the visit of American general, Matthew Ridgway, who commanded the US Eighth Army during the Korean War; he had just been appointed NATO's Supreme Commander in Europe), the "ferocity [of which] I would not have believed had I not seen it with my own eyes."

Johnson then served as the New Statesman's Paris correspondent. For a time, he was a convinced Bevanite and an associate of Aneurin Bevan himself. Moving back to London in 1955, Johnson joined the Statesman's staff.

=== Author ===
In 1957, Johnson published his first book, which was about the Suez War. An anonymous commentator in The Spectator wrote that "one of his [Johnson's] remarks about Mr Gaitskell is quite as damaging as anything he has to say about Sir Anthony Eden", but the Labour Party's opposition to the Suez intervention led Johnson to assert "the old militant spirit of the party was back". In 1958, he attacked Ian Fleming's James Bond novel Dr No. In 1964, Johnson warned of "The Menace of Beatlism", in an article contemporarily described as being "rather exaggerated" by Henry Fairlie in The Spectator. The New York Times mocked Johnson's novel Merrie England (1964):

Grown-ups who have read Evelyn Waugh will find that satire requires more than indignation and a list of funny names... Curiously enough, the hero who tries to play Savonarola amid upper-class corruption is himself a public schoolboy. You can take the boy out of the Establishment, but you can't take the Establishment out of the boy.

Johnson was successively lead writer, deputy editor and editor of the New Statesman from 1965 to 1970. He was found suspect for his attendances at the soirées of Lady Antonia Fraser, who was at the time married to a Conservative MP. There was some resistance to Johnson's appointment as New Statesman editor, not least from the writer Leonard Woolf, who objected to a Catholic filling the position, and Johnson was placed on six months' probation.

Statesmen and Nations (1971), the anthology of his Statesman articles, contains numerous reviews of biographies of conservative politicians and an openness to continental Europe. In one article, Johnson took a positive view of events of May 1968 in Paris, leading Colin Welch in The Spectator to accuse Johnson of possessing "a taste for violence". According to this book, Johnson filed 54 overseas reports during his Statesman years.

=== Ideological shift ===
During the late 1970s, Johnson began writing articles in the New Statesman in which he criticized trade unions and leftism generally. Slightly later, the New Statesman may have repudiated this, when it published an article criticising him, in a series of articles "Windbags of the West" about various conservative journalists.

Johnson served on the Royal Commission on the Press (1974–1977) and was a member of the Cable Authority (regulator) from 1984 to 1990. From 1981 to 2009, he wrote a column for The Spectator; initially focusing on media developments, it subsequently acquired the title "And Another Thing". In his journalism, Johnson generally dealt with issues and events that he saw as indicative of a general social decline, whether in art, education, religious observance, or personal conduct. He continued to contribute to the magazine, although less frequently than before. During the same period, he contributed a column to the Daily Mail until 2001. In a Daily Telegraph interview in November 2003, he criticised the Mail for having a pernicious impact: "I came to the conclusion that that kind of journalism is bad for the country, bad for society, bad for the newspaper."

Johnson was a regular contributor to The Daily Telegraph, where he was mainly as a book reviewer, and wrote for The New York Times, The Wall Street Journal, Commentary, National Review, and Forbes in the U.S. For a time in the early 1980s, he wrote for The Sun after Rupert Murdoch urged him to "raise its tone a bit". Johnson was a critic of modernity because of what he saw as its moral relativism. He objected to those who use Charles Darwin's theory of evolution to justify their atheism, such as Richard Dawkins and Steven Pinker, or use it to promote biotechnological experimentation. As a conservative Catholic, Johnson regarded liberation theology as a heresy and defended clerical celibacy, but departed from others in seeing many good reasons for ordination of women as priests.

Admired by conservatives in the United States and elsewhere, Johnson was strongly anti-communist. He defended Richard Nixon in the Watergate scandal, finding his cover-up considerably less heinous than Bill Clinton's perjury and Oliver North's involvement in the Iran–Contra affair. In his Spectator column, Johnson defended his friend Jonathan Aitken, and expressed admiration for Chilean dictator Augusto Pinochet, as well as limited admiration for Spanish fascist dictator Francisco Franco.

Johnson was active in the campaign, led by Norman Lamont, to prevent Pinochet's extradition to Spain after his 1998 arrest in London. In 1999, Johnson was reported as saying: "There have been countless attempts to link him to human rights atrocities, but nobody has provided a single scrap of evidence."

In Heroes (2008), Johnson returned to his longstanding claim that criticism of Pinochet's dictatorship on human rights grounds came from "the Soviet Union, whose propaganda machine successfully demonised [Pinochet] among the chattering classes all over the world. It was the last triumph of the KGB before it vanished into history's dustbin."

Johnson described France as "a republic run by bureaucratic and party elites, whose errors are dealt with by strikes, street riots and blockades" rather than a democracy. Johnson was a Eurosceptic who played a prominent role in the "No" campaign during the 1975 referendum on whether Britain should stay in the EC. In 2010, Johnson noted that "you can't have a common currency without a common financial policy, and you can't have that without a common government. The three things are interconnected. So this [European integration] was entirely foreseeable. Not much careful thought and judgment goes into the EU. It's entirely run by bureaucrats."

== Personal life ==
In 1958, Johnson married psychotherapist and former Labour Party parliamentary candidate Marigold Hunt, daughter of Thomas Hunt, physician to Winston Churchill, Clement Attlee, and Anthony Eden. They had three sons and a daughter: the journalist Daniel Johnson, a freelance writer, editor of Standpoint magazine and previously associate editor of The Daily Telegraph; Luke Johnson, businessman and former chairman of Channel 4; Sophie Johnson-Clark, an independent television executive; and Cosmo Johnson, playwright. Paul and Marigold Johnson have ten grandchildren. Marigold Johnson's sister, Sarah, married the journalist, former diplomat and politician George Walden. Their daughter, Celia Walden, is married to television presenter and former newspaper editor Piers Morgan.

In 1998, it was revealed that Johnson had an eleven-year affair with Gloria Stewart, a freelance journalist, who recorded them together in his study "at the behest of a British tabloid". She first claimed to have made the affair public because she objected to Johnson's hypocrisy about religion and family values, but later acknowledged that their affair ended when Johnson "found another girlfriend".

Johnson was an avid watercolourist. He was a friend of playwright Tom Stoppard, who dedicated his 1978 play Night and Day to him. Johnson died at his home in London on 12 January 2023, at the age of 94.

== Public lectures ==
In 1985, Johnson delivered the first Erasmus Lecture, inaugurating the annual lecture series sponsored by First Things magazine and the Institute on Religion and Public Life. His address, titled “An Almost Chosen People,” examined the moral and religious character of the United States, exploring how American history and politics have been shaped by a sense of divine mission. As the inaugural Erasmus Lecture, it established the series’ tradition of inviting prominent writers, scholars, and public intellectuals to reflect on faith, culture, and the moral dimensions of public life.

== Honours ==
In 2006, Johnson was honoured with the Presidential Medal of Freedom by U.S. President George W. Bush. Johnson was appointed Commander of the Order of the British Empire (CBE) in the 2016 Birthday Honours for services to literature.

== Partial bibliography ==
Johnson's books are listed by subject or type. The country of publication is the UK, unless stated otherwise.

=== Anthologies, polemics and contemporary history ===
- Johnson, Paul Bede; Abel-Smith, Brian; Calder, Nigel; Hoggart, Richard; Jones, Mervyn; Marris, Peter; Murdoch, Iris; Shore, Peter; Thomas, Hugh; Townsend, Peter; Williams, Raymond (1957), "A Sense of Outrage", in Mackenzie, Norman Ian (ed.), Conviction, London: MacGibbon & Kee, pp. 202–17.
- Johnson, Paul Bede (1957), The Suez War, London: MacGibbon & Kee.
- ——— (1958), Journey into Chaos, Western Policy in the Middle East, London: MacGibbon & Kee.
- ——— (1971), Statesmen and Nations, Sidgwick & Jackson. An anthology of New Statesman articles from the 1950s and 1960s.
- ——— (1977), Enemies of Society, Weidenfeld & Nicolson.
- ——— (1980), The Recovery of Freedom, Mainstream, Basil Blackwell.
- ——— (1981), Davis, William (ed.), The Best of Everything – Animals, Business, Drink, Travel, Food, Literature, Medicine, Playtime, Politics, Theatre, Young World, Art, Communications, Law and Crime, Films, Pop Culture, Sport, Women's Fashion, Men's Fashion, Music, Military – contributor.
- ——— (1985), The Pick of Paul Johnson, Harrap.
- ——— (1991) [1986], The Oxford Book of Political Anecdotes (2nd ed.), Oxford University Press.
- ——— (1988), Intellectuals: From Marx and Tolstoy to Sartre and Chomsky, Weidenfeld & Nicolson.
- 1994 The Quotable Paul Johnson A Topical Compilation of His Wit, Wisdom and Satire (George J. Marlin, Richard P. Rabatin, Heather Higgins (editors)), 1994 Noonday Press/1996 Atlantic Books (US)
- 1994 Wake Up Britain – a Latter-day Pamphlet Weidenfeld & Nicolson
- 1996 To Hell with Picasso & Other Essays: Selected Pieces from "The Spectator" Weidenfeld & Nicolson
- 2009 Churchill (biography), 192 pp.
- 2012 Darwin: Portrait of a genius (Viking, 176 pages)

=== Art and architecture ===
- 1980: British Cathedrals, Weidenfeld & Nicolson, ISBN 0-297-77828-5
- 1993: Gerald Laing: Portraits Thomas Gibson, Fine Art Ltd (with Gerald Laing & David Mellor MP)
- 1999: Julian Barrow's London, Fine Art Society
- 2003: Art: A New History, Weidenfeld & Nicolson

=== History ===
- 1972: The Offshore Islanders: England's People from Roman Occupation to the Present/to European Entry [1985 edn as History of the English People; 1998 edn as Offshore Islanders: A History of the English People], Weidenfeld & Nicolson
- 1974: Elizabeth I: A Study in Power and Intellect, Weidenfeld & Nicolson
- 1974: The Life and Times of Edward III, Weidenfeld & Nicolson
- 1976: Civilizations of the Holy Land, Weidenfeld & Nicolson
- 1976: A History of Christianity, Weidenfeld & Nicolson
- 1977: Education of an Establishment, in The World of the Public School (pp. 13–28), edited by George MacDonald Fraser, Weidenfeld & Nicolson/St Martins Press (US edition)
- 1978: The Civilization of Ancient Egypt, Weidenfeld & Nicolson
- 1981: Ireland: A Concise History from the Twelfth Century to the Present Day [as ...Land of Troubles, 1980, Eyre Methuen], Granada
- 1983: A History of the Modern World from 1917 to the 1980s, Weidenfeld & Nicolson – paperback
- 1983: Modern Times: A History of the World from the 1920s to the 1980s, Weidenfeld & Nicolson [later, ...Present Time and ...Year 2000 2005 edn], Weidenfeld & Nicolson – hardcover
- 1986: The Oxford Book of Political Anecdotes, Oxford University Press (editor)
- 1987: Gold Fields A Centenary Portrait, Weidenfeld & Nicolson
- 1987: A History of the Jews, Weidenfeld & Nicolson
- 1991: The Birth of the Modern: World Society 1815–1830, Weidenfeld & Nicolson, ISBN 978-1-78-022714-6
- 1997: A History of the American People, Weidenfeld & Nicolson, ISBN 0-06-093034-9
- 2000: The Renaissance: A Short History, Weidenfeld & Nicolson
- 2002: Napoleon, Viking
- 2005: George Washington: The Founding Father (Eminent Lives Series), Atlas Books
- 2006: Creators: From Chaucer and Durer to Picasso and Disney, HarperCollins Publishers (US), ISBN 0-06-019143-0
- 2007: Heroes: From Alexander the Great and Julius Caesar to Churchill and De Gaulle, HarperCollins Publishers (US), ISBN 978-0-06-114316-8, 0-06-114316-2
- 2010: Humorists: From Hogarth to Noel Coward, HarperCollins Publishers (US), ISBN 978-0-06-182591-0
- 2011: Socrates: A Man For Our Times, Viking (US)

=== Memoirs ===
- 2004: The Vanished Landscape: A 1930s Childhood in the Potteries, Weidenfeld & Nicolson, ISBN 978-0-7538-1933-3
- 2010: Brief Lives, Hutchinson

=== Novels ===
- 1959: Left of Centre, MacGibbon & Kee ["Left of Centre describes the meeting of a Complacent Young Man with an Angry Old City"]
- 1964: Merrie England, MacGibbon & Kee

=== Religion ===
- 1975: Pope John XXIII, Hutchinson
- 1977: A History of Christianity, Weidenfeld & Nicolson /1976, Simon & Schuster /Atheneum (US), ISBN 0-684-81503-6, (S&S Touchstone division paperback edition published in 1995)
- 1982: Pope John Paul II and the Catholic Restoration, St Martin's Press
- 1996: The Quest for God: A Personal Pilgrimage, Weidenfeld & Nicolson/HarperCollins (US)
- 1997: The Papacy, Weidenfeld & Nicolson
- 2010: Jesus: A Biography From a Believer, Penguin Books

=== Travel ===
- 1973: The Highland Jaunt, Collins (with George Gale)
- 1974: A Place in History: Places & Buildings of British History, Omega [Thames TV (UK) tie-in]
- 1978: National Trust Book of British Castles, Granada Paperback [1992, Weidenfeld edn as Castles of England, Scotland and Wales]
- 1984: The Aerofilms Book of London from the Air, Weidenfeld & Nicolson

Media offices
Preceded by John Freeman	Editor of the New Statesman; 1965–1970	Succeeded by Richard Crossman
