= Symbols of Power =

Book about British archaeology

- The cover of the book.
- Author: D.V. Clarke, T.G. Cowie and Andrew Foxon
- Language: English
- Subject: Archaeology
- Publication date: 1985
- Publication place: United Kingdom
- Media type: Print (Hardcover)
- Pages: 334

Symbols of Power: At the Time of Stonehenge is a book dealing with the archaeology of hierarchical symbols in the British Isles during the Neolithic and Early Bronze Ages. Co-written by the archaeologists D.V. Clarke, T.G. Cowie and Andrew Foxon, it also contained additional contributions from other authors including John C. Barrett and Joan Taylor. Published by the National Museum of Antiquities of Scotland in 1985, it was designed to accompany an exhibition on the same subject that was held that year in Edinburgh, Scotland.

Focusing in on the use of theme of how power, prestige and status were manifested in the Late Neolithic and Early Bronze Ages, it looks primarily at "the ideology of domination", in doing so adopting a quasi-Marxist approach. The book proceeds from a discussion of how hierarchical symbols are found in society to looking at the role of ancestor veneration in Early Neolithic Britain through the construction of chambered tombs. It then continues to look at the changes which accompanied the transition to Late Neolithic society, with an end to ancestor veneration and the construction of new forms of ritual monument, like henges and stone circles. Moving on, it looks at the arrival of Beaker pottery and metallurgy in the British Isles, arguing that this brought with it a new social elite who became dominant during the ensuing Early Bronze Age.

Various academic reviews were produced of the book and published in specialist journals

== Background ==
Symbols of Power was designed to accompany an exhibition which was held in Edinburgh in 1985, although the authors noted that the book was "nevertheless designed as an independent unit" that could stand-alone from the exhibit.

== Synopsis ==
In their introduction, the authors discuss the state of prehistoric archaeology in Britain, noting that at the time most of the populace still considered prehistoric people to be little more than "squat, grunting savages" and that whilst terms used for Iron Age peoples like "Celts" and "Picts" evoked an emotional response from contemporary Britons, the terms used by archaeologists for other, earlier prehistoric groups, such as "Windmill Hill culture" or the "Grooved Ware Sub-Culture", failed to do so. Proceeding to argue that the communities of prehistory were far from the "savage and primitive" people presented in the popular imagination, it then lays out its intentions in presenting a more accurate picture of prehistoric folk. Claiming that the book's theme is to look at "the manifestation of power, prestige and status in the third and second millennia bc", it notes that in doing so it will be looking primarily at the "ideology of domination", and that it will therefore take influence from the work of German sociologist Karl Marx, the founder of Marxist theory, although noted that at the same time it did not take "a doctrinal approach" in adopting any particular theoretical position, whether Marxist or otherwise. The authors then describe how symbols in contemporary British culture are used to display status and power, discussing a variety of examples from politicians to traffic wardens, in order that the reader better understands the role which symbolism has in displaying hierarchy.

"To those without access to modern scientific explanations, metal working is inherently a magical transformation of aspects of the natural world. By selecting certain stones and heating them in certain conditions a liquid is produced which can be poured into moulds of varying shapes and forms. Left to cool, the liquid becomes a solid which is at the same time bright, shiny and attractive as well as stronger and more durable than the strongest stone."

— The authors

The second chapter, entitled 'The Use of the Ancestors', discusses the Early Neolithic in Britain, as farming arrived to supplant the hunter-gatherer lifestyle that had previously dominated British society. It then goes on to look at the great reverence held for ancestors in Early Neolithic society, with the construction of chambered tombs for the dead, in doing so discussing examples such as West Kennet Long Barrow in Wiltshire and Maeshowe in Orkney. Chapter three, 'From Ancestors to Gods', looks at the Late Neolithic transition from a society dominated by tombs and ancestors to one that instead focused on the construction of causewayed enclosures, henges, cursus monuments and stone circles. In that chapter, the authors also examine decorative art from the period, for instance examining the curvilinear designs that are found on the tombs at Newgrange and Gavrinis, before then looking at the monument at Stonehenge, the most famous prehistoric site in Britain. The fourth chapter, entitled 'The Acknowledgement of Individual Power', looks at the arrival of Beaker pottery and its associated cultural traits, including metal, into the British Isles, arguing that the rise of blacksmiths and those who had the knowledge to develop metal tools soon supplanted the existing social elite. This fourth chapter also includes a section written by John C. Barrett of the University of Glasgow dealing with hoards and other metalwork from the period.
