= Wesley College (Bristol) =

Theological college in Bristol, England

Coordinates: 51.5017°N 2.6218°W

Wesley College was a theological college in the Henbury area of Bristol, England, between 1946 and 2012. As the successor to an institution established in London in 1834, it was the oldest provider of theological education for the Methodist Church of Great Britain. The college was the core institution of the South West Regional Training Network of the Methodist Church, where its partners were the South West Ministerial Training Course in Exeter and the Southern Theological Education and Training Scheme in Salisbury. It was also involved with ecumenical education.

== History ==
The Wesleyan Methodist Conference decided in 1834 to establish the Wesleyan Institution for the Improvement of Junior Preachers, which at first was based in London. By 1843, funds were available to establish Didsbury College, Manchester and Richmond College, Surrey; by 1881 these had been joined by Wesley College, Headingley and Handsworth College, Birmingham, all four considered branches of the Wesleyan Theological Institution.

Following the Methodist Union of 1932, there were two colleges in Manchester: Didsbury and Hartley Victoria. After the Second World War the Didsbury buildings were sold, and £15,000 of the proceeds were used in 1946 to establish a new college with the same name on a 22-acre site at Henbury Hill, Bristol. At first a house on the site was used, then in 1953 a new red-brick building was completed at a cost of £117,500, with accommodation for 60 students. The coat of arms of Didsbury college was displayed above the main entrance.

In 1967, Wesley College at Headingley was closed and merged into the Bristol institution, which gained the Wesley College name. The buildings were extended, and a new chapel built, with funds from the sale of the Headingley site. During the 1980s and 1990s, half the site was sold in stages to raise money for running costs and to fund the building in 1985 of Frances Greeves House, providing 23 flats for ministerial students with families.

== Role ==
Although established to prepare people for ordained ministry in the Methodist Church, and this was still a significant part of its work with an emphasis particularly on pre-ordination students who were studying part-time, the College programme became much more widely based. The teaching staff came from a wide range of Christian backgrounds. Student ministers worked alongside other students of theology, bringing a wider experience of life into the learning environment.

Wesley College provided a wide range of units in Christian theology, validated by the University of Bristol, most of which were open to lay people as well as those preparing for ordination. After 2008 the College offered a Foundation Degree (FdA) in Mission and Ministry validated by St. Mary's University College (Twickenham).

The college was a member of the Bristol Federation for Theological Education, where its partners were Bristol Baptist College and Trinity College, Bristol. As well as housing one of the most extensive theological libraries in the country, the college possessed an extensive archive with documents and artefacts from the 17th and 18th centuries, many of them related to the Wesley family.

The college was an important international research facility with students from Australia, United States, South Korea, India and Africa. Wesley College had a formal Graduate Research Agreement with Hyupsung University, South Korea and established exchange programmes with the Tamil Nadu Theological Seminary, South India, the United Church of Zambia Seminary at Kitwe and the Reutlingen Seminary, Germany.

All its courses were open to students from any denomination and the college was building a reputation for lay theological education, including the nationally recognised Pastoral Carers' Course, and partnerships with other religious denominations or bodies including the Roman Catholic Diocese of Clifton and the Benedictine Downside Abbey. The college also attracted students from the Anglican, Baptist, Pentecostal and Holiness traditions.

== Personnel ==
The last College Principal prior to its closure in 2010 was Rev. Dr. Jonathan Pye who was also Honorary Research Fellow in Medical Ethics in the University of Bristol and a recognised teacher in the University of Bristol and the University of Wales, Cardiff. Other staff amounted to the equivalent of seven full-time posts.

== Closure ==
From 2005, there was a desire to consolidate the twenty ministerial training institutions of the Methodist Church. A detailed review in 2009 found that the main building at Bristol needed up to £3.5m spent to bring it up to current standards, and the 1960s extension a further £2.3m. The finances were in deficit despite income from Bristol University for the use of Frances Greeves House, from letting other buildings and from conferences.

In July 2010, the Methodist Conference announced that Wesley College would close when current students had finished their training. Enrolled at the college during the 2009/10 academic year were four ministerial students sponsored by the Methodist Council, twenty-eight independently funded lay students on courses validated by the St Mary's University College or the University of Bristol, and sixty-four independently funded lay students on non-validated courses. The site was placed on the market in 2010.

In August 2015 it was agreed to donate a shipment of 38,000 'modern' textbooks from the college to Kenya Methodist University.
