= Glanmor Williams =

Welsh historian

Sir Glanmor Williams

Sir Glanmor Williams CBE FBA (5 May 1920 – 24 February 2005) was a Welsh historian.

Sir Glanmor was born in Dowlais, into a working-class family, and was educated at Cyfarthfa Grammar School in Merthyr Tydfil. He studied at Aberystwyth alongside Alun Lewis and Emyr Humphreys, becoming a specialist in the early modern period of Welsh history. His long academic career included 37 years at the University of Wales, Swansea, between 1945 and 1982, and ten as vice-president of the University College of Wales, Aberystwyth.

He joined Swansea University in 1945 and was Professor of History at Swansea University from 1957 to 1982, his research interests focused on the Protestant Reformation and its impact on Welsh life and culture. His exceptional study of the Welsh Church after 1282, The Welsh Church from Conquest to Reformation was published in 1962. In subsequent works, such as Owen Glendower (1966), Recovery, Reorientation and Reformation (1987), and Owain Glyndwr (1993) Williams documented how English subjugation of Wales was strengthened by the Tudor Acts of Union, and yet still offered scope for the growth and development of Welsh culture.

In Religion, Language and Nationality in Wales (1979) he described the origins of Welsh cultural and political nationalism. He wrote equally fluently in Welsh, with his best known works including: Dadeni, Diwygiad a Diwylliant Cymru (The Renaissance, the Reformation and the Culture of Wales, 1964), Grym Tafodau Tân (The Power of Fiery Tongues, 1984) and Cymru a'r Gorffennol: côr o leisiau (Wales and the Past: a choir of voices, 2000).

Williams was Vice-Principal of Swansea University from 1975 to 1978, and was also appointed to many committees in Wales and England. He served as President of the Baptist Union of Wales, National Governor of BBC Wales and Chairman of the Broadcasting Council for Wales (1965–71), on the board of the British Library and its Advisory Council. Furthermore, he was actively involved in the Board of Celtic Studies, the Pantyfedwen Trust and Cadw. He became a Fellow of the Society of Arts in 1979 and was appointed a CBE in 1981.

After his retirement from Swansea, he served as Chairman of the Ancient Monuments Board (Wales) from 1983 to 1995, Chairman of the Royal Commission on the Ancient and Historical Monuments of Wales (1986 to 90), and vice-president of the University College of Wales, Aberystwyth (1986 to 1996). In 1983 he delivered the Sir John Rhŷs Memorial Lecture. He became a Fellow of the British Academy in 1986 and was knighted in 1995. His autobiography Glanmor Williams: A Life was published in 2002. He was awarded the Freedom of the Borough of Merthyr Tydfil on 18 April 2002.

Speaking after Williams' death in Swansea in 2005, the vice-chancellor, Richard B Davies, said: "his influence on the study of Wales is incalculable. Just to meet him was a privilege."

== Publications ==
- Wales and the Reformation. (1997, University of Wales Press)
- Recovery, Reorientation and Reformation: Wales c.1415–1642, part of the Oxford History of Wales (1987, Oxford University Press)
- Grym Tafodau Tan (1984, Gomer Press)
- Owain Glyndwr (1993, University of Wales Press)
- The Welsh Church from Conquest to Reformation (1962, University of Wales Press)
- Religion, Language and Nationality (1978, University of Wales Press)
- Glanmor Williams: A Life (2002, University of Wales Press)
- Harri Tudur a Chymru (Henry Tudor and Wales) - a bilingual book (1985, University of Wales Press)
