= Geraint H. Jenkins =

British historian (1946–2025)

Geraint Huw Jenkins, FBA, FLSW (24 January 1946 – 7 January 2025) was born in Penparcau, a village outside Aberystwyth, Ceredigion in Mid Wales. He was an academic historian who specialised in the history of Wales. Jenkins married author Ann Ffrancon, with whom he had three daughters, Gwenno, Angharad and Rhiannon. From 1990 to 1993 Jenkins was Professor of Welsh History at the University College of Wales, Aberystwyth. In 1993 he became Director of the University of Wales Centre for Advanced Welsh and Celtic Studies. Jenkins retired from academia in 2009 and was appointed Emeritus professor of Welsh History at the University of Wales. In 2010 he was one of the founding fellows of the Learned Society of Wales. Jenkins wrote many essays and over thirty books on many subjects and was the general editor of the series A social history of the Welsh language.

== Life and career ==
Jenkins attended grammar school in Aberystwyth from which in 1967 he went to the University College of Wales, Swansea to study history. At Swansea he studied for a PhD on literature and religion between the Reformation and Methodism under the direction of Professor Glanmor Williams. In 1968 Jenkins returned to Ceredigion and became a lecturer in Welsh history in the University College of Wales, Aberystwyth. He was promoted to senior lecturer in 1981 and reader in 1988. And in 1990 he was appointed Professor of Welsh History. In 1993 he was appointed Director of the University of Wales Centre for Advanced Welsh and Celtic Studies, serving until 2008. In 2009 he was appointed Emeritus Professor at the University of Wales. He served on the 'Board of Celtic Studies' at the University of Wales from 1985 and chaired the board from 1993 to 2007.

Jenkins was particularly noted for his contribution to the study of Iolo Morganwg and his work in collating and editing the papers of the latter to enable the publication of A Rattleskull Genius: The Many Faces of Iolo Morganwg (Iolo Morganwg and the Romantic Tradition in Wales (2006). A reviewer described it as "a scholarly feast" but warned that "...it must run some risk of satiating the appetite it is designed to whet."

While at Swansea Jenkins played for his college football team and watched the 'Swans' at home. He subsequently wrote about footballers in Wales, three books about Swansea City Football Club, and two concise biographies about two famous Welsh international footballers, John Charles and Billy Meredith.

Jenkins died on 7 January 2025, aged 78.

== Honours ==
Jenkins received a Doctor of Letters degree from the University of Wales in 1994. He was elected a Fellow of the British Academy in 2002. And he was among the founding fellows of the Learned Society of Wales when it was established in 2010.

== Selected publications ==
=== Books ===
==== 1970s ====
- Literature, Religion and Society in Wales 1660–1730. Cardiff: University of Wales Press. 1978. ISBN 0-7083-0669-1.

==== 1980s ====
- Thomas Jones yr Almanaciwr, 1648-1713. Cardiff: University of Wales Press. 1980.
- Hanes Cymru yn Cyfnod Modern Cynnar (Revised ed.). Cardiff: University of Wales Press. 1983 [originally 1983].
- Darganfod Hanes Cymru: Llyfr 3: Llunio Cymru Fodern. Oxford: Oxford University Press. 1989. ISBN 019917136X.
- Discovering Welsh history. Bk. 3, The making of modern Wales. Oxford: Oxford University Press. 1989. ISBN 0199171408.

==== 1990s ====
- Cymru Ddoe a Heddiw. Oxford: Oxford University Press. 1990. ISBN 0199171378.
- Wales, Yesterday and Today. Oxford: Oxford University Press. 1990. ISBN 0-19-917141-6.
- Cadw Tŷ mewn Cwmwl Tystion, 1990 (Welsh Arts Council Prize, 1991)
- Protestant Dissenters in Wales, 1639–1689. Cardiff: University of Wales Press. 1992. ISBN 9780708311400.
- The foundations of modern Wales, 1642-1780. Oxford: Oxford University Press. 1993 [originally 1959]. ISBN 0192852787.
- The University of Wales An illustrated history. Cardiff: University of Wales Press. 1993. ISBN 0-7083-1223-3.
- 'Doc Tom' Thomas Richards (Dawn Dweud). Caerdydd: Gwasg Prifysgol Cymru. 1999. ISBN 0708315518.

==== 2000s ====
- The Welsh language and its social domains, 1801-1911. Cardiff: University of Wales Press. 2000. ISBN 9780708316047.
- A concise history of Wales. Cambridge: Cambridge University Press. 2007. ISBN 978-0521823678.

==== 2010s ====
- Iolo Morganwg y gweriniaethwr : darlith goffa J. E. Caerwyn a Gwen Williams 2009. Aberystwyth: Canolfan Uwchefrydiau Cymreig a Cheltaidd. 2010. ISBN 9781907029035.
- Bard of liberty The political radicalism of Iolo Morganwg. Cardiff: University of Wales Press. 2012. ISBN 978-0-7083-2498-1.
- Y Digymar Iolo Morganwg. Talybont, Ceredigion, Cymru: Y Lolfa. 2018. ISBN 9781784616267.

=== Editorships ===
==== Sole editorships ====
- A Social History of the Welsh Language, 11 vols. (University of Wales Press, 1997–2000).
- The Correspondence of Iolo Morganwg 1770–1826, 3 vols. (University of Wales Press, 2007).
- Y Gymraeg yn ei Disgleirdeb, 1997
- The Welsh Language before the Industrial Revolution, 1997
- Iaith Carreg fy Aelwyd, 1998
- Language and Community in the Nineteenth Century, 1998
- Gwnewch Bopeth yn Gymraeg, 1999
- Cymru a’r Cymry 2000, 2001

==== Joint editorships ====
- Politics and Society in Wales 1840–1922, 1988
- Merêd: Casgliad o’i Ysgrifau, 1995
- Cardiganshire in Modern Times, 1998
- Eu Hiaith a Gadwant?, 2000
- Let's Do Our Best for the Ancient Tongue, 2000
- From Medieval to Modern Wales, 2004
- A Rattleskull Genius: the many faces of Iolo Morganwg. Cardiff: University of Wales Press. 2005. ISBN 9780708319710.
- A Rattleskull Genius: the many faces of Iolo Morganwg, 2005
- Degrees of Influence, 2008
- The Welsh Language in the Twentieth Century, 2015
- Cardiganshire County History: medieval and early modern Cardiganshire, 2019
