= List of Welsh historical documents =

This is a list of Welsh important historical documents connected to Wales and/or the Welsh language, starting from the early medieval period. These documents are written in various stages of the Welsh language as well as other languages such as Latin.

== List ==
List of important historic documents (in order of time written)
Title	Date	Language	Translation	Contents	Author/Translator
Early Middle Ages
Historia Brittonum	Around 828	Latin	The History of Britain	Includes Arthurian legends	Nennius
High Middle Ages
Historia Regum Britanniae	1136	Latin	The Regal History of Britain	Pseudo-historical account of British history & kings from the founding of Celtic Britain until 682AD.	Geoffrey of Monmouth
Llyfr Du Gaerfyrddin	Before 1250	Middle Welsh	The Black Book of Carmarthen	Vellum codex: 9th-12th C poetry	
Annales Cambriae	12th Century	Latin	The Annals of Wales	Welsh history timeline from 447AD to 954AD	
Late Middle Ages
Brut y Tywysogion	1330	Middle Welsh translation of lost Latin work	Chronicle of the Princes	Continues Welsh history from the end of History Regum Britanniae beginning with the death of Cadwaladr Fendigaid in 682. Ends with a later addition of the period 1282-1332.	An unknown Welshman
Cyfraith Hywel	1350	Welsh	Laws of Hywel	Include a core of laws of King of Deheubarth, Hywel Dda likely passed during the reign 942–948, although this text contains later laws of the 12th and 13th centuries.	
Leges Hywel Dda	Mid 13th century	Latin	Laws of Hywel	Latin version of Laws of Hywel Dda.	
Llyfr Du y Waun	Mid 13th century	Welsh	The Black Book of Chirk	Codex; First record of Hywel Dda's Welsh laws	Llywelyn ap Gruffudd
Llyfr Aneirin	2nd half of 13th century	Old/Middle Welsh	The Book of Aneurin	Poetry	Aneurin
Cronicon de Wallia	Late 13th Century	Latin	The Chronicles of Wales	Welsh history during the period 1190–1266. From Exeter Cathedral.	
Llyfr Coch Hergest	Shortly after 1382	Welsh	The Red Book of Hergest	Vellum manuscript: Mabinogion; the poetry of the Gogynfeirdd	
Llythr Pennal	1406	Latin	Pennal Letter	A vision of an independent Wales	Owain Glyndŵr
Llyfr Taliesin	1st half of 14th century	Old/Middle Welsh	Book of Taliesin	Early medieval poetry	Taliesin
Llyfr Gwynedd Rhydderch	Mid 14th century	Welsh	The White Book of Rhydderch	Four branches of the mabinogi.	
Renaissance
Yny lhyvyr hwnn	1546	Welsh	In this book	The first book printed in Welsh Literary heritage of Wales	Sir John Price
Y Beibl cyssegr-lan	1588	Welsh	The Bible	The old and new testaments of the Bible.	William Morgan
