= 1986 Birthday Honours =

British government recognitions

Queen's Birthday Honours are announced on or around the date of the Queen's Official Birthday in Australia, Canada, New Zealand and the United Kingdom. The dates vary, both from year to year and from country to country. All are published in supplements to the London Gazette and many are conferred by the monarch (or her representative) some time after the date of the announcement, particularly for those service people on active duty.

The 1986 Queen's Birthday honours lists were announced on 14 June 1986.

Recipients of honours are shown below as they were styled before their new honour.

== United Kingdom ==
=== Life Peers ===
==== Barons ====
- The Right Honourable Sir Philip Moore, G.C.B., G.C.V.O., C.M.G., Q.S.O., lately Private Secretary to The Queen.
- The Right Honourable William Francis Deedes, M.C., D.L., lately Editor, The Daily Telegraph.
- The Honourable Mark Raymond Bonham Carter. For public service.

=== Privy Counsellors ===
- Norman Stewart Hughson Lamont, M.P., Financial Secretary to the Treasury. Member of Parliament, Kingston upon Thames.
- The Honourable Sir John Brinsmead Latey, M.B.E., Judge of the High Court of Justice, Family Division.
- Sir Patrick (Barnabas Burke) Mayhew, Q.C., M.P., Solicitor General. Member of Parliament, Tunbridge Wells.

=== Knights Bachelor ===
- George Oswald Browning Allen, C.B.E., T.D. For services to Cricket.
- Stanley Ernest Bailey, C.B.E., Q.P.M., Chief Constable, Northumbria Police.
- Roy Yorke Calne, Professor of Surgery, University of Cambridge.
- John Gowen Collyear, Chairman, AE plc.
- Colin Ross Corness, Chairman, Redland plc.
- Andrew George Derbyshire, Chairman, Robert Matthew Johnson Marshall and Partners.
- Antony Victor Driver, Chairman, South West Thames Regional Health Authority.
- John Leopold Egan, Chairman and Chief Executive, Jaguar plc.
- Gerald Henry Elliot, Chairman, Christian Salvesen plc.
- Colin Cunningham Fielding, C.B., Controller, Research and Development Establishments, Research and Nuclear, Ministry of Defence.
- Professor Christopher David Foster. For public services.
- John Marcus Fox, M.P., M.B.E. For political service.
- Alan David Greengross. For political and public service.
- Stanley Gordon Grinstead, Chairman and Group Chief Executive, Grand Metropolitan plc.
- Ralph Mark Halpern, Chairman and Chief Executive, Burton Group plc.
- Michael Eliot Howard, C.B.E., M.C., Regius Professor of Modern History, University of Oxford.
- Thomas Philip Jones, C.B., Chairman, Electricity Council.
- Colin Alan Bettridge Leslie, President, The Law Society.
- John Gordon Seymour Linacre, C.B.E., A.F.C., D.F.M., Deputy Chairman and Chief Executive, United Newspapers plc.
- Ian Stewart Lloyd, M.P. For political service.
- Ian Kinloch MacGregor, Chairman, British Coal.
- Professor Malcolm Campbell Macnaughton, President, Royal College of Obstetricians and Gynaecologists.
- John Denis Mahon, C.B.E., Art Historian.
- Kit (Christopher William) McMahon, lately Deputy Governor, Bank of England.
- Gerald Nigel Mobbs, D.L., Chairman and Chief Executive, Slough Estates Ltd.
- Professor Mark Henry Richmond, Vice-Chancellor, Victoria University of Manchester.
- Brian Norman Roger Rix, C.B.E. For services to the mentally handicapped.
- Michael Graham Ruddock Sandberg, C.B.E., J.P. For public services in Hong Kong.
- Arthur Noel Stockdale, Chairman, ASDA-MFI Group plc.
- James Keith Stuart, Chairman, Associated British Ports Holdings plc.
- Martin Francis Wood, O.B.E., D.L., Deputy Chairman, The Oxford Instruments Group plc.

==== Australian States ====
- Graham Edward McCamley, M.B.E. For service to the beef cattle industry.

=== Order of the Bath ===
==== Knight Grand Cross of the Order of the Bath (GCB) ====
- Admiral Sir Peter Stanford, K.C.B., L.V.O., A.D.C.

==== Knight Commander of the Order of the Bath (KCB) ====
Military Division

- Vice Admiral George Montague Francis Vallings.
- Vice Admiral John Morrison Webster.
- Air Marshal John Barry Duxbury, C.B.E., Royal Air Force.
- Air Marshal Anthony Gerald Skingsley, C.B., Royal Air Force.

Civil Division

- Alan Marshall Bailey, C.B., Permanent Secretary, Department of Transport.
- The Right Honourable Sir William Frederick Payne Heseltine, K.C.V.O., C.B., Private Secretary to The Queen.
- John Christopher Sainty, Clerk of the Parliaments.

==== Companion of the Order of the Bath (CB) ====
Military Division

Royal Navy

- Rear Admiral Timothy Michael Bevan
- The Venerable Archdeacon Noel Debroy Jones, Q.H.C.

Army

- Major General John Francis Bowman (449681), Army Legal Corps.
- Major General David Edwin Miller, C.B.E., M.C. (418335), Colonel The King's Own Royal Border Regiment
- Major General Charles Jeremy Rougier (430433), late Corps of Royal Engineers.
- Major General Michael Timothy Skinner (430445), late Royal Regiment of Artillery.
- Major General Bryan Courtney Webster, C.B.E. (415013), Deputy Colonel (City of London) The Royal Regiment of Fusiliers (now retired).

Royal Air Force

- Air Vice-Marshal Alfred Beill.
- Air Vice-Marshal Frederick Charles Hurrell, O.B.E., Q.H.P.
- Air Vice-Marshal Brian Huxley, C.B.E.

Civil Division

- Alan John Aveling, Under Secretary, Department of the Environment.
- William Anderson Beaumont, O.B.E., A.E., Speaker's Secretary, House of Commons.
- William Geraint Thomas Pennant Colfer, Under Secretary, Ministry of Defence.
- David Michael Dell, Deputy Secretary, Department of Trade and Industry.
- Ronald Henderson Hedley, Director, British Museum (Natural History).
- Thomas Strachan Heppell, Deputy Secretary, Department of Health and Social Security.
- Peter Julian Kitcatt, Under Secretary, H.M. Treasury.
- John Fraser Mayne, Deputy Secretary, Cabinet Office (Management and Personnel Office).
- George Ewart McClelland, Solicitor, Department of Employment.
- Alan Austen McMillan, Solicitor, Scottish Office.
- John Pakenham-Walsh, Under Secretary (Legal), Home Office.
- Geoffrey George Pope, Director, Royal Aircraft Establishment, Farnborough, Ministry of Defence.
- James Douglas Milne Rennie, Parliamentary Counsel.
- James Stuart-Smith, Judge Advocate General.
- James Brian Unwin, Deputy Secretary, Cabinet Office.
- Gordon Wallace Wilson, Principal Finance Officer, Ministry of Agriculture, Fisheries and Food.

Australian States

- Leo Joseph Murray, Q.C. For public service.

=== Order of St Michael and St George ===
==== Knight Grand Cross of the Order of St Michael and St George (GCMG) ====
- Sir Antony Acland, K.C.M.G., K.C.V.O., H.M. Ambassador-designate, Washington.

==== Knight Commander of the Order of St Michael and St George (KCMG) ====
- Christopher Keith Curwen, C.M.G., Foreign and Commonwealth Office.
- Lord Nicholas Charles Gordon Lennox, C.M.G., L.V.O., H.M. Ambassador, Madrid.
- John William Denys Margetson, C.M.G., H.M. Ambassador, The Hague.
- Brian Edward Urquhart, M.B.E., lately Under-Secretary General, United Nations, New York.
- John Stainton Whitehead, C.M.G., C.V.O., Foreign and Commonwealth Office.

==== Companion of the Order of St Michael and St George (CMG) ====
- John Lewis Beaven, C.V.O., H.M. Consul-General, San Francisco.
- John Carver Church, M.B.E., lately H.M. Consul-General, Naples.
- Bernard Coleman, lately H.M. Ambassador, Asuncion.
- Richard Borman Crowson, British High Commissioner, Port Louis.
- John Harold Fawcett, lately Deputy British High Commissioner, Wellington.
- David Lionel Napier Goodchild, lately Commission of the European Communities, Brussels.
- Roger John Harding, Assistant Secretary, Defence Staff, Washington, Ministry of Defence.
- Noel Hedley Marshall, Minister, H.M. Embassy, Moscow.
- John Dudley Massingham, British High Commissioner, Georgetown.
- Anthony Reeve, Foreign and Commonwealth Office.
- George Anthony Shephard, lately Counsellor, British High Commission, New Delhi.
- Andrew Marley Wood, H.M. Ambassador, Belgrade.

=== Royal Victorian Order ===
==== Knight Commander of the Royal Victorian Order (KCVO) ====
- Geoffrey de Bellaigue, C.V.O.

==== Commander of the Royal Victorian Order (CVO) ====
- Captain The Honourable Edward Nicholas Canning Beaumont, L.V.O.
- Colonel Richard John Vesey Crichton, M.C.
- Cecil Edward Guinness.
- Sir William Loris Mather, O.B.E., M.C., T.D.
- Ewart George Pratt.

==== Lieutenant of the Royal Victorian Order (LVO) ====
- Major The Most Honourable Dermot Richard Claud, Marquess of Donegall.
- Captain John Patrick Clarke, M.B.E., Royal Navy.
- Major Ronald Charles Hicks.
- Miss Charmian Nancy Lacey.
- Roy Frederick Long.
- Christopher John Robinson.
- Commander James Lincoln Bardolf-Smith, Royal Navy.
- Annabel Alice Hoyer, The Honourable Mrs Whitehead.
- Richard Neville Alexander Wills, I.S.O.

==== Member of the Royal Victorian Order (MVO) ====
- Peter John Richard Byford.
- Chief Yeoman Warder Cecil Davis.
- Winifred Imogen, Mrs Eldridge.
- Michael Charles William Norreys Jephson.
- Alexander McDonald.
- Dorothy Muriel Dugdale, Mrs Ollivant.
- Captain Anthony James Moxon Lowther-Pinkerton, Irish Guards.
- Harry Chamberlain Taffs, D.F.C.

=== Royal Victorian Medal (RVM) ===
==== Royal Victorian Medal (Silver) ====
- Kenneth George Bailey.
- Miss Christine Margaret Bain.
- Richard Charles Boland.
- Alfred Charles Bye.
- Sergeant Fergus Dominic Grant, Royal Air Force.
- Police Sergeant John Robert Harding, Metropolitan Police.
- Henry James Hawtrey.
- Frederick Charles Kemp.
- Yeoman Bed Goer Frank Lobley, The Queen's Body Guard of the Yeomen of the Guard.
- Miss Amy Lowe.
- Michael Vasey Potter.
- Keith Arthur Rooksby.
- Leslie Robert Simmons.
- Chief Technician Richard Forgie Somerville, Royal Air Force.
- Eric Williams.
- June Irene, Mrs Williams.

=== Order of the British Empire ===
==== Dame Commander of the Order of the British Empire (DBE) ====
- Miss Merle Florence Park, C.B.E. (Mrs Bloch), Director, Royal Ballet School.

==== Knight Commander of the Order of the British Empire (KBE) ====
- Professor Ernest Donald Acheson, Chief Medical Officer, Department of Health and Social Security.
- Raymond Kenelm Appleyard, lately Commission of the European Communities, Brussels.
- George Henry Hubert, Earl of Harewood, lately Managing Director, English National Opera. For services to Music.
- The Right Honourable George Patrick John Rushworth, Earl Jellicoe, D.S.O., M.C., Chairman, British Overseas Trade Board.
- Air Marshal David William Richardson, Royal Air Force.
- Vice Admiral Patrick Jeremy Symons.

==== Commander of the Order of the British Empire (CBE) ====
Military Division

- Captain Jonathan Cecil Appleyard-List, Royal Navy.
- Captain Julian James Mitchell, Royal Navy.
- Miss Jean Robertson, R.R.C., late Matron in Chief, Queen Alexandra's Royal Naval Nursing Service.
- Colonel Wardle Robson Barker, late Royal Corps of Transport.
- Colonel James Bryce Emson, late The Life Guards.
- Colonel William Edmund Falloon, T.D., A.D.C., Honorary Colonel Queen's University (Belfast) Officers' Training Corps, Territorial Army.
- Brigadier John Peter William Friedberger, M.B.E., late The Royal Hussars (Prince of Wales's Own).
- Brigadier Rolph Noel Richmond Perry James, late Corps of Royal Engineers.
- Brigadier Helen Guild Meechie, A.D.C., Women's Royal Army Corps.
- Brigadier Michael John Perkins, late Royal Regiment of Artillery (now retired).
- Air Commodore Robert Charles Allen, Royal Air Force.
- Group Captain Peter Graham Botterill, O.B.E., A.F.C., Royal Air Force.
- Air Commodore Paul Vincent Mayall, Royal Air Force.
- Group Captain David John Saunders, A.D.C., Royal Air Force.

Civil Division

- Geoffrey Denis Erskine, Baron Ampthill. For services to Parliamentary Committees.
- Patience Helen Mary, Lady Baden-Powell. For services to the Girl Guides Association.
- Michael David Bishop, Chairman and Managing Director, British Midland Airways Ltd.
- John Christopher Bowman, Secretary, Natural Environment Research Council.
- David Brierley, General Manager, Royal Shakespeare Company.
- Robert Sidney Bunyard, Q.P.M., Chief Constable, Essex Police.
- Harry Burke, Foreign and Commonwealth Office.
- Norman Cary Burrough, Chairman, James Burrough plc. For services to Export.
- Colonel David Archibald Campbell, O.B.E., T.D. lately Chairman, Forestry Safety Council.
- Stuart John Carne, O.B.E., lately Chairman, Standing Medical Advisory Committee.
- Leonard Ernest John Chant, Director of Social Services, Somerset County Council.
- Foster Ferrier Harvey Charlton, D.F.C., Senior Partner, Linklaters and Paines.
- David Beatson Clark, T.D., Executive Chairman, Beatson Clark plc.
- William John Wesley Courtney, Chairman, British Board of Agrément.
- Elisabeth Mary Boyd, Lady Crawshay, D.L. For public service in Wales.
- Paul John Dahlhoff, Treasury Valuer, Rating of Government Property Department.
- Irwin Dalton, Executive Vice-Chairman, National Bus Company.
- David Evan Naunton Davies, Professor of Electronic and Electrical Engineering, University College, London.
- John Anthony Derrington, lately Director and Head of Design, Sir Robert McAlpine and Sons Ltd.
- John Duke, Q.P.M., Chief Constable, Hampshire Constabulary.
- Donald Desmond Durban, Joint Deputy Chief Executive, Trusthouse Forte plc.
- Robert John Edwards, lately Deputy Chairman and Senior Group Editor, Mirror Group.
- Arthur John Ellis, Chairman and Chief Executive, Fyffes Group Ltd.
- Wilson Ervin, Director, Northern Bank Ltd.
- Richard Harry Evans, Divisional Deputy Managing Director, Military Aircraft Division, British Aerospace plc.
- Alexander Fenton, Research Director, Royal Museum of Scotland.
- David Abraham Goitein Galton, Professor of Haematology, University of London.
- Ronald Garrick, Managing Director and Chief Executive, Weir Group plc.
- Douglas Lindley Georgala, Head of Colworth Laboratory, Unilever Research, Unilever plc.
- Norman Gidney, Chairman, Gidney Securities Ltd.
- Peter Austin Goodwin, Director, National Investment and Loans Office.
- Francis St John Corbet Gore, Adviser on paintings, National Trust.
- Edward Michael Wynne Griffith, D.L. For services particularly to Agriculture in Wales.
- John Ross Harper. For political and public service.
- William Flett Hay, M.B.E., President, Scottish Fishermen's Federation.
- John Trevor Hayes, Director, National Portrait Gallery.
- Professor Jack Charles Hayward, Director, Nursing Education Research Unit, King's College London.
- James Warwick Hele, High Master, St Paul's School, Barnes, London.
- John Derrik Hender, D.L., lately Chief Executive, West Midlands Metropolitan County Council.
- David Hugh Laing Hopkinson, R.D., Deputy Chairman and Chief Executive, M. & G. Group plc.
- Vera, Lady Houghton. For services to women's health and to the Family Planning Association.
- Cyril Raymond Howard, Managing Director, Pinewood Studios Ltd. For services to the British Film Industry.
- Eric Waldo Benjamin Howells. For political and public service.
- George David Inge-Innes-Lillingston, D.L., Crown Estate Commissioner.
- Philip Mark Jones, O.B.E. For services to Music.
- Edwin Kerr, Chief Officer, Council for National Academic Awards.
- Peter Joseph Little, Collector, Board of Customs and Excise.
- John Charles Lowein, Chairman, Mobil Oil Company Ltd.
- Benjamin Matthew Luxon, Singer.
- John Lyons, General Secretary, Electrical Power Engineers' Association, and Engineers' & Managers' Association.
- Finlay Mackenzie, General Manager, Hewlett-Packard Ltd.
- Duncan James Macleod, Senior Partner, Ernst and Whinney, Glasgow.
- Professor Thomas Kenneth Marshall, State Pathologist, Northern Ireland.
- Geoffrey Haward Martin, Keeper of the Public Records.
- Philip Reynolds Matthew, Deputy Director-General, Commonwealth War Graves Commission.
- James Sinclair Mcfarlane, Director General, Engineering Employers' Federation.
- Tom Montague Meyer, Chairman, Board of Governors, National Heart and Chest Hospitals, London.
- John Clifford Mortimer, Q.C., Playwright and author.
- Royston John Mountain, Chairman and Managing Director, Avimo Ltd.
- Charles Edwin Needham, Director, Coalite Group plc.
- William Henry Parker, lately Assistant Secretary, Department of Agriculture for Northern Ireland.
- Kenneth Ritchie Paterson, Director of Finance, Strathclyde Regional Council.
- John Morris Peake, Chairman, Baker Perkins plc.
- Richard Wintour Phelps, lately General Manager, Central Lancashire New Town Development Corporation.
- Archibald Ernest Pitcher, President, Ogilvy & Mather Ltd.
- Ian Prestt, Director, Royal Society for the Protection of Birds.
- Alastair Tarrant Pugh, Executive Vice Chairman, British Caledonian Airways.
- Harcourt Neale Raine, Chairman, Business and Technician Education Council.
- Joseph William Raine, M.B.E., Chairman, Livestock and Wool Committee, National Farmers' Union.
- Professor Anthony John Harding Rains, Assistant Director, British Postgraduate Medical Federation, University of London.
- Professor Philip Alan Reynolds, D.L., lately Vice-Chancellor, University of Lancaster.
- John Edmund Riding, Consultant Anaesthetist, United Liverpool Hospitals.
- Francis Edward Ritchie, O.B.E., Treasurer, Council for National Parks.
- Roy Ernest James Roberts, Managing Director, Guest Keen and Nettlefolds plc.
- David Greig Robertson, Director of Education, Tayside Region.
- John Dermot Ryan, Chairman, Argyll and Clyde Health Board.
- John Joseph Salisse, lately Director, Marks and Spencer plc.
- Colin Sanders, Managing Director, Solid State Logic Ltd.
- Derek William Saunders, Professor of Polymer Physics and Engineering, Cranfield Institute of Technology.
- James Norman Scott, lately Director of Contracts, General Electric Company plc. For services to Export.
- Roger John Sellick, Assistant Chief Valuer, Board of Inland Revenue.
- Benjamin Shaw, lately Chairman, Royal Liverpool Philharmonic Society.
- Ernest Alwyn Smith, Professor of Epidemiology and Social Oncology, University of Manchester.
- George Taylor Smith. For political and public service.
- Brian Tesler, Chairman and Managing Director, London Weekend Television Ltd.
- John William McWean Thompson, lately Editor, Sunday Telegraph.
- Cyril Jesse Tite. For political service.
- Lewis John Wynford Vaughan-Thomas, O.B.E. For services to Welsh culture.
- Peter John Vinson, Chairman, Construction Equipment and Mobile Cranes Economic Development Committee.
- David Maxwell Walker, Q.C., Regius Professor of Law, University of Glasgow.
- Duncan Amos Watson, Chairman, Royal National Institute for the Blind.
- John Reginald Weeks, lately Senior Partner, Llewelyn-Davies Weeks.
- Deryk Vander Weyer, Deputy Chairman, British Telecommunications plc.
- Geoffrey Crichton Wilkinson, A.F.C., Chief Inspector of Accidents, Department of Transport.
- Francis Julian Williams, D.L., Chairman, Cornwall County Council.
- Brigadier James Wilson (Retired), Chief Executive, Livingston Development Corporation.
- John Trevor Wilson. For political and public service.
- Peter Jeffrey Wordie, T.D., Chairman, Stirling Shipping Ltd.

Overseas

- Samuel Benady, O.B.E. For public services in Gibraltar.
- Ho Sin-hang, O.B.E. For public and community services in Hong Kong.
- Arthur Stirling Maxwell Marshall, O.B.E., H.M. Ambassador, Aden.
- Stewart Ranson Smith, British Council Representative, Spain.
- Peter Wong Chak-cheong, O.B.E., J.P. For public services in Hong Kong.

Australian States

- August Shaw Gehrmann, D.S.O., E.D., M.I.D. For service to education and the community.
- William David Swanston Harpham. For service to rural industry.

==== Officer of the Order of the British Empire (OBE) ====
Military Division

- Commander Jeffrey Albert Bagg, Royal Navy.
- Commander Daniel Conley, Royal Navy.
- Commander Mahesh Dutta, Royal Navy.
- Commander John Faulkner, Royal Navy.
- Commander Brian Frank King, Royal Navy.
- Commander John Michael Kingsland, Royal Navy.
- Commander Alwyn Harold Lorimer, Royal Navy.
- Commander Ian McKechnie, Royal Navy.
- Commander David Peter Mears, L.V.O., Royal Navy.
- Commander John Ernest Porter, L.V.O., Royal Navy.
- Lieutenant Colonel (Local Colonel) David Christopher Lester Rowe, Royal Marines.
- Lieutenant Colonel Ram Krishna Banerjee, T.D., Royal Army Medical Corps, Territorial Army.
- Major (Local Lieutenant Colonel) Michael Charles Barrett, Royal Corps of Signals.
- Major (Acting Lieutenant Colonel) Andrew John Craigie, Royal Regiment of Artillery.
- Lieutenant Colonel Clive Fletcher-Wood, Royal Regiment of Artillery.
- Lieutenant Colonel Michael John Charles Galloway, Royal Corps of Signals.
- Lieutenant Colonel Robert Douglas Hanscomb, The Royal Hampshire Regiment.
- Lieutenant Colonel Grenville Shaw Johnston, T.D., D.L., 51st Highland Volunteers, Territorial Army.
- Acting Lieutenant Colonel Allan Victor Knivett, Army Cadet Force.
- Lieutenant Colonel Clive William Larkin, The Royal Irish Rangers (27th (Inniskilling) 83rd and 87th).
- Lieutenant Colonel (now Acting Colonel) Jeremy Charles Lucas, Royal Corps of Transport.
- Lieutenant Colonel (now Acting Colonel) Gordon John Rawlins, Corps of Royal Electrical and Mechanical Engineers.
- Lieutenant Colonel Orrok Mark Roberts, The Royal Regiment of Wales.
- Lieutenant Colonel George Frank Smythe, M.B.E., The Royal Green Jackets.
- Lieutenant Colonel Julian Nicholas George Starmer-Smith, Royal Regiment of Artillery.
- Lieutenant Colonel (Master at Arms) George Talkington, M.B.E., Army Physical Training Corps, (now retired).
- Lieutenant Colonel (Quartermaster) Norman Welch, M.B.E., Coldstream Guards.
- Lieutenant Colonel Hugh Grainger Willmore, The Staffordshire Regiment.
- Wing Commander Michael John Cunningham, M.B.E., Royal Air Force.
- Wing Commander Robin Dixon, Royal Air Force.
- Wing Commander Rodney Ian Essai, Royal Air Force.
- Wing Commander David Hayward, Royal Air Force.
- Wing Commander David Frank Andrew Henderson, Royal Air Force.
- Wing Commander Peter Charles Hobbs, Royal Air Force.
- Wing Commander Peter Desmond Markey, Royal Air Force (now Group Captain).
- Wing Commander John McCabe, Royal Air Force.
- Wing Commander William George Monro, Royal Air Force Volunteer Reserve (Training).
- Wing Commander James Brian Thornton, Royal Air Force.
- Wing Commander Norman Duncan Want, Royal Air Force.

Civil Division

- Michael Brian Abrahams, Commercial Director, GEC Turbine Generators, For services to Export.
- George Culpin Adams, Chairman, George Adams and Sons (Holdings) Ltd.
- Robin Allingham Aisher. For services to Sport and particularly to Yachting.
- David Raymond Allen. Chairman, DHL International (UK) Ltd.
- Hugh John Appleton, Chairman, Boards of Prison Visitors Co-ordinating Committee.
- David Montgomery Archibald, Director, North East Area, British Coal.
- Roger Atkinson, Inspector (SP), Board of Inland Revenue.
- Miss Gillian Ayres, Artist.
- Brenda Julia Neltie, Mrs Ball. For political service.
- Guy Crossland Barrett, Joint Managing Director, Henry Barrett and. Sons Ltd.
- Peter Glanville Hoy Bath, Adviser, Petroleum Engineering, Shell UK BP.
- Michael Day Beaumont. For political and public service.
- Haro Moushegh Bedelian, General Manager, Southern Construction Division, Balfour Beatty Construction Ltd.
- Lily Christine, Mrs Best, lately Staff Officer to Superintendent-in-Chief, St John Ambulance Brigade.
- James McMeekin Bill. For services to Medicine in the Prison Service in Northern Ireland.
- John Albert Birch, Director of Patient Services, North Lincolnshire Health Authority.
- Miss Janet Margaret Bonner, H.M. Inspector of Schools, Department of Education and Science.
- Michael John Borrow. For services to oceanology.
- Stuart Ralph Bosworth, Registrar, University of Salford.
- Frank Bracewell, Director of Planning, Central Regional Council, Scotland.
- Patrick Alphonsus Bradley, Chief Electoral Officer for Northern Ireland.
- Lady Romayne Elizabeth Algitha Brassey, Vice-President, Lincolnshire Branch, British Red Cross Society.
- Eric Merrington Briscoe, Chairman, Fairey Tecramics Ltd.
- Gordon Ronald Douglas Calder, Director, National Training Board Association of British Travel Agents.
- Miss Rosemary Anne Calvert, Secretary, Northern Ireland Board, Royal College of Nursing.
- Elizabeth Muriel, Mrs Campbell, Vice-Chairman (Scotland), Women's Royal Voluntary Service.
- Sylvester Campbell. For services to Agriculture in Scotland.
- Samuel Howard Carson, Principal, Lord Chancellor's Department.
- Neville John Carver, A.F.C., Director, Business Strategy, British Leyland plc.
- William Scott Charles. For services to community education in Scotland.
- David Brian Barrie Cheverton, Marketing Director, Fairey Marine Ltd.
- Colonel Stephen Hudson Clark (Retired), D.L., Secretary, East Midlands, Territorial Auxiliary and Volunteer Reserve Association.
- Cynthia Ann, Mrs Clayton, lately Chairman, United Kingdom Branches Committee, Save the Children Fund.
- Cyril Cohen, lately Director, Scottish Hospital Advisory Service.
- Dennis Leslie Cooper-Jones, Manager, Technical Defence Systems Division, Standard Telephones and Cables plc.
- Norman Cowie, Convener, Banff and Buchan District Council.
- Joseph Henry Cross, Director, Off-Shore Survival Centre, Robert Gordon's Institute of Technology.
- William James Crozier, Member, Police Complaints Board for Northern Ireland.
- Miss Eileen Bernadette Cullen, Company Secretary, National Westminster Bank plc.
- Stephen George Curtis, Chairman, Redbridge Health Authority.
- Keith Davy. For political and public service.
- Michael John Dawson, Executive Chairman, Tunstall Telecom Group plc.
- Peter Dawson, General Secretary, Professional Association of Teachers.
- John Victor Derben. For services to the Scout Association in Hampshire.
- Miss Vera June Di Palma, Deputy Chairman, Air Travel Reserve Fund Agency.
- Reginald Cecil Dobbs, Chairman, Kirton Experimental Horticulture Station Advisory Committee, Boston, Lincolnshire.
- Michael John Domaille, lately Assistant Chief Constable, West Yorkshire Metropolitan Police.
- Michael Gerald Donne, Aviation Correspondent, Financial Times.
- Alan Ivimy Ransom Dow, Personnel Director, London Electricity Board.
- Archie Anthony Downie, Chairman, Manchester Council for Community Relations.
- William John Dunbar, lately Chief Executive, British Steel Corporation (Industry) Ltd.
- Professor George Mackenzie Dunnet, Chairman, Shetland Oil Terminal Environmental Advisory Group.
- John Eastwood. For services to energy conservation.
- Noel Richard Elwis, lately Chairman, Dental Estimates Board.
- Irene, Mrs Endean, lately District Nursing Officer, Dewsbury Health Authority.
- Brian David Fairgrieve, D.L. For services to the Scout Association in Blair Atholl, Tayside.
- Norman Edward Feasey, Chief Coach and Repetiteur, Royal Opera, Covent Garden.
- Professor John Edward Flood, Chairman, Telecommunications Standards Committee, British Standard Institute.
- Keith Foreman, Warden, Comberton Village College, Cambridgeshire.
- John Fowles, Member and former Chairman, Southern Regional Council, Confederation of British Industry.
- David John Francis, Curator, National Film Archive, British Film Institute.
- Thomas Terence Fulton, Consultant Physician, Royal Victoria Hospital, Belfast.
- Warren Hugh George, Headmaster, Maesteg Comprehensive School, Mid Glamorgan.
- John Burgess Goddard, Henry Daysh Professor of Regional Development Studies and Head of Department of Geography, University of Newcastle upon Tyne.
- William Godfrey. For political service.
- Miss Margaret Dorothy Green, Director of Education and Principal, Institute of Advanced Nursing Education, Royal College of Nursing.
- Miron Grindea, M.B.E., Editor, Adam International Review.
- Albert Guinney, Chief Metropolitan Ambulance Officer, Mersey Metropolitan Ambulance Service.
- Derek Selby Gwynne, Managing Director, The Bentley Engineering Company Ltd.
- Ernest Hall, Chairman, Dean Clough Industrial Park Ltd.
- Elisabeth Margaret Ethelwyn, Mrs Harland. For services to the community in Cambridge and to the Cambridge Health Authority.
- Ruth, Mrs Harrison, Member, Farm Animal Welfare Council.
- Ernest Alfred Hawkins, Grade 6, Department of the Environment.
- Gerald Alan Hazlewood, Chairman and Managing Director, Westwood Engineering Ltd.
- Raymond Edwin Heal, Chairman, Somerset and Dorset Area Manpower Board.
- Harry Hill, lately Chairman, Apple and Pear Development Council.
- Joyce Dorothy Wilsone, Mrs Hill. For political and public service.
- Joseph Bernard Hirons, lately Senior Principal Scientific Officer, Ministry of Agriculture, Fisheries and Food.
- Alan John Fraser Hoby, lately Sports Columnist, Sunday Express.
- John Godfrey Barton Holmes. For charitable and public services, particularly in Lincolnshire.
- John Emlyn Hooson. For services to agriculture in Wales.
- James Charles Howard, Chief Engineer, Oxfam.
- Harold William Denis Hughes, Director and General Manager, Exploration Companies, British Gas Corporation.
- William Eric Hughes, Superintending Professional and Technology Officer, Ministry of Defence.
- David Arthur Humphreys, Principal, Stockport College of Technology.
- Margaret Elisabeth Honor, Mrs Hunter, Principal, Ashleigh House Grammar School, Belfast.
- William Cecil Hurst, Northern Ireland Divisional Director, Industrial Training Service Ltd.
- Michael Warren Ingram, D.L., Vice-Chairman, Executive Committee, Central Council of Probation Committees.
- Edward Innes, lately Chief Executive, Nobel's Explosives Company Ltd.
- Thomas Harold Jackson. For services to the Magistracy in Kingston-upon-Hull.
- Gervase Frank Ashworth Jackson-Stops, Architectural Adviser, National Trust.
- David Watson James, General Dental Practitioner, Cardiff.
- Clive Frederick Jeanes. For services to the Confederation of British Industry in the North West Region.
- Frederick Duncan John Johnson, County Surveyor, Somerset County Council.
- David Jones, Chairman, Welsh National Board for Nursing, Midwifery and Health Visiting.
- Edwin Jones, Headmaster, St Joseph's Roman Catholic School, Sandfields, Port Talbot.
- Thomas Parry Jones, Chairman and Managing Director, Lion Laboratories Ltd.
- Jeffrey Noel Kay, M.M., lately Director of Finance, Administration and Legal Services, New Towns Commission.
- Graham Stuart Keddie, Chairman and Managing Director, GSPK Ltd.
- Miss Freda Kellett, Headmistress, Birkenhead High School.
- Norman Alec Kirke. For services to the Scotch Whisky industry.
- John David Knapp. For political service.
- James Gibson Knox, Chief Executive, Fife Ethylene Project, Esso Chemical Ltd.
- John Le Marquand, Senator of the States of Jersey.
- Edward Herbert Lear. For political and public service.
- Alan Bernard Leonard. For political service.
- Donald Lewis Lewis. For services to the building industry in Wales.
- Roger Lines, Principal Scientific Officer, Forestry Commission.
- Norman Alexander MacAskill, Vice-Chairman, Crofters' Commission.
- Malcolm James Mace, Q.F.S.M., lately Chief Officer South Glamorgan Fire Service.
- Miss Lily Edna Minerva Mackie (Mrs Betts), Headmistress, City of London School for Girls.
- John Charles Bingham Mant. For political and public service.
- Kenneth Masterson, Principal, Department of Transport.
- Geoffrey Vernon Townsend Matthews, Director of Research, Wildfowl Trust.
- John Joyce McCabe, Principal, Scottish Courts Administration.
- Brendan Gerard McKeown, Division Production Manager, Amoco (UK) Exploration Company.
- Donald McKinlay, lately Senior Principal Surveyor for Scotland, Lloyd's Register of Shipping.
- Robert Dobson McLean, lately Senior Principal, Department of Health and Social Security.
- Robert Keith Meacham, Leader, Solihull Metropolitan Borough Council.
- Christopher Rome Meyer. For political and public service.
- James Milne, lately Managing Director, Hall Russell Ltd.
- Gilbert Edward George Lariston Murray Kynynmound-Elliot, Earl of Minto, M.B.E., D.L., Chairman, Scottish Council on Alcoholism.
- Wendy, Mrs Mitchell. For political and public service.
- Harry Traherne Moggridge, Partner, Colvin and Moggridge.
- Glyn Trevor Morgan, Deputy Director of Audit, National Audit Office.
- John Edwin William Morris, Principal Scientific Officer, Ministry of Defence.
- Frank Newby, Headmaster, Forest School, Horsham, West Sussex.
- Lawrence John Charles Norcross, Headmaster, Highbury Grove School, London.
- Leslie Singlehurst Northen, lately Chairman, Livestock Auctioneers Market Committee for England.
- Sarah Craig, Mrs Orr. For services to Industrial arbitration.
- John Palette, Managing Director, Personnel, British Railways Board.
- Elizabeth Mair, Mrs Pattinson. For services to the community in Conwy, Gwynedd.
- Walter Johnstone Pennel, lately Bishoprics Secretary, Church Commissioners.
- John Eric Pentelow. For political and public service.
- Miss Valerie June Pettit, Foreign and Commonwealth Office.
- Ronald James Pickering. For services to Athletics.
- George Thomas Ventress Pindar, Chairman, G. A. Pindar and Son Ltd.
- David Andrew Pinnell, lately Managing Director, Birmingham Broadcasting Ltd.
- Bernard Marshall Pratt. For political and public service.
- Edward Charles Prest, D.F.C., lately Chairman, Faber-Prest Holdings plc.
- Professor Peter Quilliam, Chairman of Convocation, University of London.
- Anthony Cleaver Randle, lately Borough Engineer and Surveyor, London Borough of Hounslow.
- Edward Rea, Managing Director, Ondawel (GB) Ltd.
- Richard Donald Read. For services to the Greater Manchester Federation of Boys' Clubs.
- Robert Allan Robertson, Senior Principal Scientific Officer, Macaulay Institute for Soil Research.
- James Alexander Robinson, Chairman, Northern Dairies (Ireland) Ltd.
- Francis St Dominic Rowntree, Chairman, National Home and Leisure Safety Committee, Royal Society for the Prevention of Accidents.
- Professor John Tracey Scales. For services to Bio-Medical Engineering.
- Derek Scholes, Deputy Superintending Specialist Inspector of Factories, Health and Safety Executive.
- David Reginald Walter Scott, Assistant Chief Constable, Sussex Police.
- Peter John Scott, Headmaster, City of Leeds School.
- Graham Shaylor, City Planning Officer, Birmingham City Council.
- Roy William Simons, lately Technical Director, Marconi Radar Systems Ltd.
- Ivan Smith, Principal Scientific Officer, Ministry of Defence.
- Samuel John Spence, Joint Managing Director, Richardson, Fertilisers Ltd.
- Frances Margaret, Mrs Stanton. For political and public service.
- George Steven, Q.P.M., Assistant Chief Constable, Lothian, and Borders Police.
- Frank Strickland, Director and General Manager, Sunderland and Shields Building Society.
- Eric Sykes, Actor.
- Robert Leonard Sykes, Director, British Leather Confederation.
- Daniel Thomas Taverner, Area Inspector of Schools, London Borough of Newham.
- Ronald James Temple, lately Superintending Professional and Technology Officer, Ministry of Defence.
- Kenneth Roy Thomason. For political and public service.
- Robert Thomson, lately Director Sales, Army Weapons Division, Stevenage, British Aerospace plc. For services to Export.
- Bernard Joseph Throp, Architect, Powell, Moya and Partners.
- Keith Rex Thrower, Technical Director, Racal- Chubb Ltd. For services to Export.
- Captain Frank Michel Tippetts, V.R.D., R.N.R. (Retired), Area Representative Chairman, South West Area, Sea Cadet Corps.
- Stanley William Tracey, Jazz pianist and composer.
- Roy David Turley, Headmaster, Stalham High School, Norfolk.
- Captain John Russell Turner, General Manager, Aberdeen Harbour Board.
- Miss Sarah Virginia Wade, M.B.E. For services to Lawn Tennis.
- Miss Helen Margaret Wallis, Map Librarian, British Library.
- Guy Willoughby Ward. For political and public service.
- Professor Philip Frank Wareing, Chairman, Advisory Committee on Forest Research, Forestry Commission.
- Thomas Wharton, Chairman, Football Grounds Improvement Trust.
- Frank Edward Wildman, Senior Principal, Department of Trade and Industry.
- Enid, Mrs Winder, Inspector (P), Board of Inland Revenue.
- Brian Richard Charles Worth, Deputy Assistant Commissioner, Metropolitan Police.
- Noel Diamond Wright, Secretary, Northern Ireland Council for Postgraduate Medical Education.
- Reginald Charles Wright, Assistant Director, Central Council for Education and Training in Social Work.
- Ian Robert Young, Manager, Picker Research Laboratory, GEC plc.
- Paul Conrad Beswick. For services to the British community in Switzerland.
- John Stuart Burley. For services to British aviation and community interests in Moscow.
- The Honourable Aedgyth Bertha, Mrs Callinicos. For services to Anglo-Zimbabwe relations.
- Violet Jeannette, Mrs Cannonier, Chairman, Public Service Commission, Bermuda.
- Alan Blake Carles. For services to animal husbandry in Kenya.
- Henry Clements. For services to British commercial interests in Chile.
- James Easton, First Secretary (Administration), H.M. Embassy, Rome.
- Dr Joseph George Emery. For services to medical education in Nigeria.
- Francis Xavier Gallagher, Head of Chancery, H.M. Embassy, Beirut.
- John Westgarth Guy, Head of Chancery, H.M. Embassy, Maputo.
- John Hanratty, First Secretary (Consular), British High Commission, Kuala Lumpur.
- Alwyne George Harrison. For services to British commercial interests in Bombay.
- Christopher John Holden, First Secretary, British High Commission, Nairobi.
- Arthur Kaye Howard. For services to British interests in Qatar.
- Dr Denny Huang Mong-hwa, J.P. For public services in Hong Kong.
- Edward Stirrat Hunter. For services to British commercial and community interests in Bahrain.
- Dr Henrietta Ip Man-hing, J.P. For public and community services in Hong Kong.
- Richard Thomas Jenkins, lately First Secretary, H.M. Embassy, Warsaw.
- Raymond Francis Jones, First Secretary (Commercial), British High Commission, New Delhi.
- Philip Isidore Joseph, lately International Staff, NATO, Brussels.
- Dr Khoo Kian-kang, J.P. Deputy Director of Medical Services, Hong Kong.
- Kwok Tak-seng. For community services in Hong Kong.
- Lau Man-lung, J.P. For public services in Hong Kong.
- James McDougall. First Secretary (Administration), H.M. Embassy, Vienna.
- Bryce Henry Moncrieff MacGill. For services to British commercial interests in Barcelona.
- Nicholas Anthony Francis Maxwell-Lawford. For services to British commercial interests in Paris.
- Stanley Moss, Deputy Representative, British Council, Nigeria.
- William Robin Thomas Muir. For services to the British community in São Paulo.
- Herbert Anthony Nowell. For services to British commercial interests in Malaysia.
- David John Rundle, Director, British Institute, Florence.
- Nicholas Rutherford. For services to British commercial interests in Malawi.
- Christopher George Nicholas Ryder. For services to British commercial interests in Japan.
- Ronald Ernest Simpson. For services to British commercial and community interests in Rio de Janeiro.
- Jack Snowden. For services to British commercial interests in Singapore.
- Harry Jack Spence, Head of Chancery, H.M. Embassy, Vienna.
- Norman Bertram Stalker, M.B.E., Director of Audit, Hong Kong.
- William James Syratt, lately Resident British Representative, St Vincent.
- Ronald Frederick George Trewick. For services to British commercial interests in Nigeria.
- Ivor Llewellyn Watts, British Council Representative, Israel.

Australian States

- James Rexter Breaden. For public service.
- Daphne Melvia Mrs. Buckley. For service to the community and women's organisations.
- James Mott Dowrie. For service to the engineering industry.
- Sydney John Miller. For service to veterinary science.
- William Kerrod Park. For service to the community.
- Eric Roberts-Thomson. For service to Agriculture.

==== Member of the Order of the British Empire (MBE) ====
Military Division

Royal Navy

- Lieutenant Commander Arthur John Batson, Royal Navy.
- Warrant Officer Air Engineering Artificer Robert Mitchell Birnie.
- Lieutenant Commander John Craythorne Clifford, Royal Navy.
- Lieutenant Commander Frederick Peter Crews, Royal Navy.
- Warrant Officer Marine Engineering Artificer (Hull) John Richard Denzey.
- Lieutenant Allenton Leslie Benjamin Fisher, Royal Navy.
- Lieutenant Commander (SCC) David Dorian Estcourt GAY, Royal Naval Reserve.
- Lieutenant Commander Ronald John Gould, Royal Navy.
- Lieutenant Kenneth Paul Green, Royal Navy.
- Warrant Officer (Operations) (Missile) Trevor James Thomas Hudson.
- Warrant Officer Steward David Charles Longbone.
- Lieutenant Commander Geoffrey Alan Roy McCready, Royal Navy.
- Lieutenant Commander Tom James Phillips, Royal Navy.
- Warrant Officer Medical Technician (Laboratory)
- David William Ralph.
- Lieutenant John Neil Saunders, Royal Navy.

Army

- Major Michael Hugh Argue, M.C., The Parachute Regiment.
- Warrant Officer Class 1 William Stanley Bamber, The Queen's Lancashire Regiment.
- Captain (now Major) (Quartermaster) Bryan Stanley Broadhurst, Royal Tank Regiment.
- Major (now Acting Lieutenant Colonel) Rodney William Brummitt, Royal Tank Regiment.
- Major Frank Arthur Butterworth, Royal Army Ordnance Corps.
- Warrant Officer Class 2 (now Acting Warrant Officer Class 1) Thomas Byrne, Corps of Royal Engineers.
- Acting Captain Eric James Cairns, Army Cadet Force (now retired).
- Major Rory Rodney Hugh Clayton, Royal Regiment of Artillery.
- Warrant Officer Class 2 Moira Elizabeth Vernon Colquhoun, Women's Royal Army Corps (now discharged).
- Major Derek Leonard Copeland, Royal Corps of Signals.
- Major Charles William Crawford, Corps of Royal Engineers.
- Major Michael Anthony Davidson, The Parachute Regiment.
- Warrant Officer Class 2 Raymond Davies, Corps of Royal Engineers.
- Major Lewin Ralph Eaton, Royal Corps of Transport.
- Captain James Andrew Esson, Royal Corps of Signals, Territorial Army.
- Captain Francis Cormac Finnegan, Royal Army Pay Corps, Territorial Army.
- Captain (now Major) Peter Robert Cowley Flach, The Royal Hussars (Prince of Wales's Own).
- Major (Brevet Lieutenant Colonel) Edgar Matheson Gibson, T.D., D.L., 51st Highland Volunteers, Territorial Army (now retired).
- Major Adrian Philip Golland, T.D., Royal Monmouthshire Royal Engineers (Militia), Territorial Army.
- Major Roland Henry Grimshaw, L.V.O., Irish Guards.
- Major Michael Hamilton Hardy, Royal Regiment of Artillery.
- Captain George Henderson, Royal Corps of Transport.
- Major (now Lieutenant Colonel) Walter Mathewson Holmes, Royal Canadian Regiment.
- Warrant Officer Class 1 David Johnson, Corps of Royal Electrical and Mechanical Engineers.
- Major John Christopher Law King, The Green Howards (Alexandra, Princess of Wales's Own Yorkshire Regiment).
- Captain (now Major) Nicholas Adrian Leadbetter, Corps of Royal Electrical and Mechanical Engineers.
- Captain David Michael Limb, The Parachute Regiment.
- Captain Ronald Maxwell, Corps of Royal Engineers, Territorial Army.
- Major (Quartermaster) Dennis Robert Bruce Munro, Royal Regiment of Artillery.
- Acting Major John Robert Neal, Combined Cadet Force.
- Captain (Quartermaster) Jeremiah Christopher O'Connor, Royal Army Medical Corps, Territorial Army.
- Major David Anthony Paul Odd1E, Royal Army Pay Corps.
- Captain (Queen's Gurkha Officer) Partapsing Gurung, Gurkha Transport Regiment.
- Major (Director of Music) Donald Elwyn Pryce, Corps of Royal Engineers (now retired).
- Major (Electrical Mechanical Assistant Engineer) Alan John Reed, Corps of Royal Electrical and Mechanical Engineers.
- Captain (Acting Major) Clive Stuart Rigby, T.D., Corps of Royal Engineers, Territorial Army.
- Major James Michael Shaw, Royal Corps of Signals.
- The Reverend John Millar Shields, Chaplain to the Forces 3rd Class, Royal Army Chaplains' Department.
- Warrant Officer Class 2 Anthony Alexander Smith, Royal Regiment of Artillery.
- Warrant Officer Class 2 Peter Sowden, Corps of Royal Engineers.
- Warrant Officer Class 1 David George Walters, The King's Regiment, Territorial Army.
- Major Derek Michael Webb, Corps of Royal Engineers.
- Captain (now Major) '(Quartermaster) George Wood, The King's Own Scottish Borderers.

Royal Air Force

- Squadron Leader Christopher James Alan Abbott, Royal Air Force.
- Squadron Leader Thomas McKenzie Arnot, Royal Air Force.
- Warrant Officer Brian Bailey, Royal Air Force.
- Warrant Officer John Bateson, Royal Air Force.
- Squadron Leader David Charles Bernard, Royal Auxiliary Air Force.
- Squadron Leader Terry Frederick Burnett, Royal Air Force.
- Squadron Leader Michael William Frank Collins, Royal Air Force.
- Flight Lieutenant Edward Leigh Gothard, Royal Air Force.
- Squadron Leader Derek Victor Hartland, Royal Air Force.
- Squadron Leader Barry Hicks, Royal Air Force.
- Warrant Officer Colin Holmes, Royal Air Force.
- Squadron Leader Richard Olney Lewis, Royal Air Force Regiment.
- Warrant Officer Patrick Vincent McGinley, Royal Air Force.
- Squadron Leader William Thomas Soutar Neish, Royal Air Force Volunteer Reserve (Training).
- Squadron Leader William Buthlay Charles Ritchie, Royal Air Force.
- Squadron Leader Robert James Robinson, Royal Air Force Volunteer Reserve (Training).
- Squadron Leader Peter John Ruff, Royal Air Force Regiment.
- Squadron Leader Kenneth Ronald Frank Sexton, Royal Air Force.
- Flight Lieutenant Gordon Alan Statham, Royal Air Force.
- Flight Liteutenant Frank Herbert Townsend, A.E., Royal Air Force Volunteer Reserve.
- Squadron Leader Sam Toyne, Royal Air Force.
- Warrant Officer Eric Sydney Waterfall, Royal Air Force.
- Squadron Leader Alexander Charles Wedderburn, Royal Air Force.
- Squadron Leader Andrew Thomas Baigent Wilkinson, Royal Air Force.

Civil Division

- John Denis Abbott. For political service.
- Marjorie Felicite, Mrs Adcock. For services to the community in Market Harborough.
- Miss Barbara Field Scott Allan, Administrative Assistant, Scottish Film Council.
- Major Douglas John Anderson, M.C., D.L., Chairman, Tweed River Purification Board.
- David Frederick Andrews, Principal Technical Projects Engineer, Thorn EMI Automation Ltd.
- Cyril Nelson Edward Angell, Technical Manager, Avon Industrial Polymers.
- Eric John Angell, Assistant Director, British Retailers Association.
- Roland Annis, lately Engineering Officer, Council for Small Industries in Rural Areas.
- Leslie William Ashman, County Director and Deputy Commissioner, Kent St John Ambulance Brigade.
- Esme, Mrs Ashton, Clerical Assistant, Gloucestershire Constabulary.
- Geoffrey Frederick Asplin, lately Senior Professional and Technology Officer, Ministry of Defence.
- John Edwin Axten. For services to the community in Kendal, Cumbria.
- Keith Ayton, Surveyor, Board of Customs and Excise.
- Tony Ball. For services to energy efficiency.
- Eleanor Thomson, Mrs Barton, Headteacher, Barrowfield Primary School, Glasgow.
- Thomas Pollock Stevenson Baxter, Manager, Industrial Section, Industrial Relations Department, British Steel Corporation.
- Barry John Beardall, Secretary and Committee Member, Maldon Housing Association.
- Derek Beevers, lately Secretary, Wakefield Local Pharmaceutical Committee.
- Harold Dennis (Dickie) Bird, Cricket Umpire.
- John Black, lately Industrial Manager I, H.M. Prison, Perth.
- Peter James Boizot. For political and public service.
- Ann Rosalie Lloyd, Mrs Bowden, Member, South Western Electricity Consultative Council.
- John Frederick Bowen, Deputy Director General, Federation of Civil Engineering Contractors.
- Joan Maud, Mrs Bradbee, Personal Secretary, Imperial Chemical Industries plc.
- Brian Brotherston, lately Secretary, Livestock Marketing Commission.
- Marian Matilda, Mrs Brown. For services to the Citizens' Advice Bureau Service in Frome and the Wessex area.
- Rachel Mackinnon, Mrs Buchanan. For services to the mentally handicapped in Dunbartonshire.
- Benjamin Burgess, Chairman, Ben Burgess and Company.
- Kenneth Jonathan Burris, Supervising Traffic Examiner, Department of Transport.
- Peter Buxton, Sports Editor, Stoke Evening Sentinel.
- Margaret Taylor Young, The Honourable Mrs Campbell. For political and public service.
- Maurice William Chapman, Managing Director, Acrastyle Ltd.
- Kenneth Glyn Charles. For services to Basketball.
- Caroline Elizabeth, Mrs Chojecki, Senior Lecturer, Ministry of Defence.
- Miss Violet Beatrice Margaret Clark, Inspector, Board of Inland Revenue.
- Brian Austin Coates, Chief Building Control Officer, East Hertfordshire District Council.
- Colin Roy Colson, lately Detective Superintendent, Metropolitan Police.
- George Burns Connor, Estimating Manager, Aircraft Contracts, Short Brothers Ltd.
- Bruce Campbell Conochie, lately General Medical Practitioner, West Midlands.
- Robin Bruce Cowe. For services to Border Farming, Forestry and Conservation in Berwickshire.
- Jeanette, Mrs Crookes, Higher Executive Officer, Department of Health and Social Security.
- Brian John Crosby, Chairman, Surrey War Pensions Committee.
- Albert Thomas Cryer, lately Chief Reporter, New Observer Group of Newspapers.
- Geoffrey Carrington Dale, lately Nuclear Safety Officer, Central Electricity Generating Board.
- Dorothy Alexandrina, Mrs Daniel, lately Chairman, Visiting Committee, HM Prison, Aberdeen.
- Eleanor Elsie, Mrs Davey, Nursing Sister, Billingsgate Christian Mission and Dispensary.
- Leonard Owen Davies, Controller, Personnel, Industrial Relations and Organisation, Wales and the Marches Postal Region, Post Office.
- David James Harvey Davis, lately Station Controller, Gibraltar, Services Sound and Vision Corporation.
- William Arthur Day. For services to the disabled in West Dorset.
- Captain Stoffel Johannes de Geus. For services to the Royal Society for the Prevention of Cruelty to Animals, particularly in Cardiff.
- John Gerald Prosper De Knop, lately County Supplies Officer, Kent County Council.
- Norman Buchanan Dent. For political service.
- Humphrey Mark Dobinson, Coordinator of Special Needs, Dorcan Comprehensive School, Swindon.
- Sidney Charles Drew, Local Officer II, Department of Health and Social Security.
- Ann Elizabeth, Mrs Drummond, District Superintendent Radiographer Frimley Park Hospital, West Surrey and North East Hampshire Health Authority.
- Thomas Ernest Dugdale, lately Higher Executive Officer, Natural Environment Research Council.
- William Aitken Dunlop, Director of Environmental Health, Perth and Kinross District Council.
- Iain James Anthony Dyer, Member, Glasgow District Council.
- Miss Janet Anne Nicholson Eager, Executive Director, London Contemporary Dance Theatre.
- Joan Marjorie, Mrs Ebbutt, Chairman, Croydon Committee Cancer Research Campaign.
- Margaret Mary, Mrs Edwards, Senior Superintendent of typists, Health and Safety Executive.
- Robert Wynne Edwards. For services to agriculture in Clwyd.
- Philip Arthur Embley, Chief Inspector, Manufacturing Services Group, Smiths Industries Aerospace and Defence Systems Ltd.
- Patrick Michael Entwistle, Member, Transport Users' Consultative Committee for North West England.
- Esme Marjorie, Mrs Epton, Secretary, Cheshire Federation of Parent-Teacher Associations.
- Donald Frederick Esson, Deputy County Surveyor, Northumberland County Council.
- David Evans, Headteacher, Tudor Church of England Primary School, Sudbury, Suffolk.
- Donald Sydney Michael Carey Evans, Inspector, Board of Inland Revenue.
- Eleanor Margaret, Mrs Evans. For services to the London Welsh community.
- Kenneth Laurence Ewers, Higher Executive Officer, Department of Health and Social Security.
- William Harry Fakes, Higher Executive Officer, Board of Inland Revenue.
- John Douglas Farnfield, lately Chief Superintendent, Metropolitan Police.
- Stanley Fellows, (Managing Director, Sandon Flexographic Printing Rollers Ltd.
- William John Ferguson, Q.G.M., Chief Superintendent, Royal Ulster Constabulary.
- Robert Gordon Field, Export Sales Finance Manager, Austin Rover Group Ltd. For services to Export.
- Clarence George Horatio Filor, E.R.D. For services to the Royal British Legion in Northern Ireland.
- Doreen Christina Jane, Mrs Fison. For services to the elderly and disabled in Ayrshire.
- John Charles Brian Fitzsimmons, Detective Chief Superintendent, Royal Ulster Constabulary.
- David Edwin Fletcher, Chairman, Pennine Heritage.
- Richard Munro Fox. For services to Canoeing.
- Dewi Bowen Francis, lately Headteacher, Llanfawr County Primary School, Holyhead.
- Bertram Frank, lately Curator, Ryedale Folk Museum.
- Albert Edward Freeth, Engineering Manager, Aircraft Tyres, Dunlop Aviation Division.
- Percy Fretwell, Joint Director, P. & J. Fretwell Ltd.
- Miss Delia Frost, Nursing Officer, Brackley Cottage Hospital, Brackley, Northants.
- John Michael Fussell. For services to the Swansea Festival.
- Peter Harold Galley, Chief Superintendent, Metropolitan Police.
- Dominick Albert Gennett, Labour Control Officer, Works Department, Cumbernauld Development Corporation.
- Pamela Patricia, Mrs Gibson, Deputy Director, Community Council of Suffolk.
- John Alnham Gilbert. For services to the British Racing School, Newmarket.
- James Nicolson Gillam, Assistant Director, Scottish Examination Board.
- Joseph Graham Glover. For political and public service.
- Roland Frederick Godfrey, Film Animator.
- Arthur Charles Gough, Senior Executive Officer, Ministry of Defence.
- Douglas Clifford Gough, Vice-President, The Royal Naval Association.
- William Desmond Graham, Brigade Training Officer, Fire Authority for Northern Ireland.
- Brian Douglas Grant, Chief Pilot, Flight Refuelling Ltd., R.N.A.S., Yeovilton.
- Edward Grant, Choirmaster and Organist Emeritus, Royal Air Force College, Cranwell.
- Roland Anthony Greaves, Head of Nursing Standards, Mental Handicap Unit, North East Essex Health Authority.
- Albert Stanley Green. For services to Youth in Guernsey.
- Miss Eleanor Beatrice Katharine Gregorson, Joint Head, Waddell School of Music, Edinburgh.
- Ronald George Griffin, Specialist Typist, Lord Chancellor's Department.
- Glyndwr Griffiths, Chairman, Civilian Committee, No. 1455 (Brynamman) Squadron, Air Training Corps.
- Albert Joseph Hall, Chief Welfare Officer, Department of Education and Science.
- Miss Kathleen Mary Veronica Hall, lately Senior Careers Adviser, Department of Economic Development, Northern Ireland.
- Madeline, Mrs Hall-Jackson, Joint Managing Director, Eurotec Optical Fibres Ltd.
- Miss Moira Patricia Halls, Collector, Board of Inland Revenue.
- Peter Cornelius Hanbury, Proprietor, Tornado Power Systems.
- Louis Edwin Hancock, lately Secretary, National Children's Bureau.
- John Wilson Hanson, Governor III, H.M. Detention Centre, North Sea Camp.
- Edna Winifred, Mrs Hardy, lately Headmistress, Ordsall County Primary School, Salford.
- Mary Jane, Mrs Harper, Matron Manager, Beaconfield Marie Curie Home, Belfast.
- Ian Joseph Hartill, Assistant Director (Gas Resources Engineering), British Gas Corporation.
- Margaret Henrietta, Davidson, Mrs Hay. For political service.
- Evan Edward Haynes, Chairman, Essex Branch, Soldiers' Sailors' and Airmen's Families Association.
- David James Headridge. For political and public service.
- William Henry Heaney, Training Manager, Northern Ireland Catering Industry Training Board.
- John Hemingway. For political and public service.
- Jean Leckie, Mrs Hepburn, Chairman, Management Committee, Cheshire Home, Fife.
- Eric Hickman. For services to the community in Ravensthorpe, Northampton.
- George Henry Hill, Managing Agent for Youth Training Schemes, Manpower Services Commission.
- Miss Gladys Hephzibah Hoare, Clerical Assistant, Civil Aviation Authority.
- Catherine Alexina, Mrs Hogg. For services to the community in Berwick-upon-Tweed.
- Margaret, Mrs Holden, Local Officer II, Department of Health and Social Security.
- Miss Virginia Antoinette Holgate (Mrs Leng). For services to Riding.
- John Ingham Holt. For political and public service.
- Thomas Francis George Hood. For services to the training and rehabilitation of the disabled.
- George Edward Hooks, Chief Technician and Laboratory Superintendent, Geology Department, University of Reading.
- Mary Maureen Hunter, Mrs Horden. For political and public service.
- Kenneth Horner, Senior Professional and Technology Officer, Department of Transport.
- Vincent George Hudson. For services to local government and the community in Lincoln.
- Richard Hughes-Rowlands. For political service.
- Miss Jean Rosemary Hunter, Night Sister, Crawley Hospital, Mid-Downs Health Authority.
- Margaret Eileen, Mrs Jackson. For political and public service.
- Marcus Amram Israel Jacobson, lately Automotive Engineering Consultant, Automobile Association.
- Isobel Frances, Mrs Japp, Sister (Acute Thoracic Surgical Ward), Hairmyres Hospital, East Kilbride, Lanarkshire.
- Alec Arthur Jeavons, Industrial Relations Officer, Western Area, British Coal.
- Clare, Mrs Jeffries, Chief Executive, Cambridge and District Chamber of Commerce and Industry.
- James Arthur Jenkins, lately Executive Officer, Department of Health and Social Security.
- William Edward Jenkins, Senior Tutor, Department of Adult and Continuing Education, University College, Swansea.
- Robert Thomas Jones, lately Assistant Divisional Officer, Gwynedd Fire Service.
- Roy Jones, Contracts Manager, Department of Engineering, Warrington and Runcorn Development Corporation.
- Sydney James Judson. For services to the elderly in York.
- Frederick Keedle, Chief Safety Officer, Felixstowe Dock and Railway Company.
- Peter Alexander Kennerley, Principal Lecturer in English, Liverpool Polytechnic.
- Patricia Linda, Mrs Kent, Head Teacher, Truro Nursery School, Cornwall.
- Gerald Keown, Area Manager, North East, Northern Line, London Underground Ltd.
- John Kerr, Director, William Kerr Farms Ltd.
- Gerald Andrew King. For political and public service.
- Miss Pauline Gertrude Kinnane, Senior Superintendent of Typists, Public Record Office, Northern Ireland.
- Derek Shawcross Knight, Stores Officer Grade A, Ministry of Defence.
- Jane, Mrs Lamb. For services to the community in the North East of Scotland.
- John Robert Leach, Chairman, Sussex Sea Fisheries Committee.
- John James Lee, Head, Technical and Standards Department, Federation of British Electrotechnical and Allied Manufacturers' Association Ltd.
- Thomas Christopher Robert Legge, lately Mayor, King's Lynn and West Norfolk Borough Council.
- Cecilia Frances, Mrs Lineham, lately Secretary to Board of Governors, Lagan College.
- Patricia Mary, Mrs Linton, Area Organiser, Cheshire and Merseyside, Women's Royal Voluntary Service.
- Frances Gordon, Mrs Littlejohn. For services to the Scout Association in Kincardineshire.
- Miss Yvonne Mary Pearl Littlewood, Executive Producer, Light Entertainment (Variety), British Broadcasting Corporation.
- Audrey, Mrs Lock, Youth Leader, Holtspur Youth Club, -Buckinghamshire.
- John Lovegrove, Chairman and Managing Director, Greengrove Welding Wires Ltd.
- Donald Macdonald. For services to Gaelic history and culture.
- Irving Machell, Secretary, North Eastern Area, Royal Air Forces Association.
- Olive Phyllis, Mrs Macleod. For services to the community in Lochinver.
- Dr Gaye Melodic Anne Manwaring (Mrs. Wilson), Senior Lecturer in Educational Technology, Dundee College of Education.
- David Crawford Marshall, V.R.D., Farmer, Broughton, Biggar.
- Esther Molly, Mrs Maughan, Headmistress, Breckon Hill Primary School, Middlesbrough.
- Hazel Edna, Mrs McCabe, lately Mayor, Canterbury City Council.
- Henry Gourlay McCreath, T.D.. For public service in Berwickshire and Northumberland.
- Miss Margaret McElrea, Nursing Officer (Health Visiting), Omagh, Western Health and Social Service Board.
- Peter McGregor, lately Higher Scientific Officer, Department of Trade and Industry.
- Samuel Baxter McIlroy. For services to Association Football.
- Roger Antony Nigel McKechnie, Managing Director, Derwent Valley Foods Ltd.
- Monica Catherine, Mrs McMullan. For charitable services to the visually and physically handicapped.
- James Forbes Haining Melville. For services to the voluntary housing movement.
- Alfred Philip Galabin Michelmore. For services to the conservation of plant and animal wildlife in Devon.
- Charles Middleton, Director, P. & J. Johnstone Ltd.
- Miss Joan Anne Miller, lately Director of Nursing Services, Freeman Hospital Unit, Newcastle Health Authority.
- Patricia Margaret, Mrs Mist, Supervisor, Windsor Tourist Information Centre.
- June Vivienne, Mrs Moore, Trade Executive (Seeds) United Kingdom Agricultural Supply Trade Association.
- Harry Moorhouse, Senior Executive Officer, Board of Inland Revenue.
- Cyril George Morgan, Higher Executive Officer, Lord Chancellor's Department.
- Nina Elizabeth, Mrs Morgan, Member, Exeter Road Safety Committee.
- Albert Edward Morris, Maritime Consultant and Arbitrator, The Baltic Exchange.
- Thomas Lewis Morris, Higher Executive Officer, Department of Employment.
- Lieutenant Colonel William John Morris, M.C. (Retired). For services to the Royal British Legion in Cheltenham.
- Derek Michael Mosley, Senior Executive Officer, Department of Health and Social Security.
- Gilbert Stanley Mottram, Foreign and Commonwealth Office.
- Elsie, Mrs Moult. For services to the British Council of Churches.
- Herbert John Moxey, Senior Naval Architect, Brooke Marine Ltd.
- James Sydney Mulgrove, District Secretary, Amalgamated Union of Engineering Workers.
- Raymond Mulholland, Director, Liverpool Youth Music Committee.
- Miss Shelia Mary Mullally, General Medical Practitioner, Cheltenham.
- Victor Edward John Neal. For services to the community in Gosport, Hampshire.
- George Nodder Newell., lately Head Technician, Department of Genetics, University of Edinburgh.
- George Newson, General Manager, Quinton-Hazell Ltd.
- Miss Annie Nicolson. For political service.
- Ralph Desmond Nixon, Divisional Manager, Electronics Division, English Electric Valve Company Ltd.
- Miss Ella Margery Noble. For services to the community, particularly the Westmorland County Hospital in Kendal.
- William Norman Pallace, Higher Executive Officer, Advisory, Conciliation and Arbitration Service.
- Patricia Anne, Mrs Parker, Field Director, OXFAM.
- Howard Guy Parkes, Medical Director, British Rubber Manufacturers' Association Ltd.
- Winifred, Mrs Parry. For political and public service.
- Irene May, Mrs Pass, lately Detective Inspector, West Midlands Police.
- Margaret, Mrs Pass, lately Higher Executive Officer, Department of Employment.
- Gurney Philip Patchett, Chief Engineer, R.A.F. Midland Radar, Airwork Ltd.
- David Paterson. For political and public service.
- Michael John Payne, Executive Officer, Board of Inland Revenue.
- Felicity Margaret Elizabeth Prudence, Mrs Peace, Headmistress, Ossett Holy Trinity Church of England Infants School.
- Robert Peacock, President, Coleraine and District Youth League.
- Phyllis Isobel, Mrs Pearsall, Chairman, Geographers' A–Z Map Company Ltd.
- Stephen John Perryman. For services to Association Football.
- Kathleen Mary Spencer, Mrs Pinkney. For political and public service.
- Audrey Gladys, Mrs Poole, lately Senior Executive Officer, Treasury Solicitor's Department.
- Ronald William Porter, Clerical Officer, Ministry of Defence.
- James Gerrard Potter, Chief Executive, Freeman Group Ltd.
- Eric James Powell, Development Manager, John McGavigan and Company Ltd.
- Melyyn George Pratt, Senior Scientific Officer, Ministry of Defence.
- Frank Slingsby Proctor, Regional Civil Engineer, Southern Region, British Railways.
- Ann Sybille, Mrs Rachlin, Founder/Chairman, Beethoven Fund for Deaf Children.
- Major Robert Randerson (Retired), Officer Commanding, Royal Army Ordnance Corps Expeditionary Forces Institute.
- George Merry Read, Proprietor and Managing Director, George Read Transport Ltd.
- Miss Hazel Ethel Isabel Reed, Treasurer, Association of Wrens.
- Hella Johanna Helene, Mrs Rees, Chairman and Joint Managing Director, Gnome Photographies plc.
- James Melrose Reid, Higher Professional and Technology Officer, Department of the Environment.
- John Richardson, Chairman, League of Friends, Warrington District General Hospital.
- Miss Margaret Ida Annie Ridley. For services to the handicapped in Plymouth, Devon.
- Miss Elizabeth Ann Robinson, Registrar, The Institute of Metals.
- Beryl Frances, Mrs Rodell. For political and public service.
- Cyril Rogers, lately Section Inspector, British Waterways Board.
- Richard Douglas Rogers, General Medical Practitioner, Kensington.
- Samuel John Russell, Managing Director, Simclar International, Dunfermline.
- Michael Patrick Ryan, General Medical Practitioner, Livingston.
- Ved Singh Sarpal, Equal Opportunities Adviser, Kirklees Metropolitan Council.
- Violet Vere Charlotte, Mrs., Schwerdt, President, Wild Flower Society.
- Miss Kathleen Christine Scrymgeour, Headteacher, Whitworth Park Special School, Moss Side, Manchester.
- Robert James Semple, Chairman, Ulster Farmers' Union Potato Committee.
- Barbara Freda, Mrs Shanks. For services to the handicapped in Cumbernauld.
- Donald Joseph Sidebottom, Chairman and Chief Executive, Glasdon Ltd.
- Thomas Simpson, Managing Director, Hunters of Brora Ltd.
- Miss Joyce Mary Skues, lately Director of Nursing Services, St Thomas' Hospital, London.
- Eric Victor Smith, Chief Administrative Officer, Department of Medical Officer of Health for the Port and City of London.
- Isabel Mary, Mrs Smith. For political and public service.
- Margaret Thelma, Mrs Smith, Chairman, Edinburgh Fund Raising Committee, Cancer Research Campaign.
- Phyllis Alma, Mrs Smith. For services to the community in Benenden, Kent.
- Ronald Harvey Smith, Managing Director, Harvey Plating Ltd.
- Reginald Charles George Snow, Higher Executive Officer, Department of Health and Social Security.
- Miss Muriel Ethel Spokes. For services to the community in Birmingham and district.
- Cecily Christabel, Mrs Stentiford, lately Theatre Sister, St Richard's Hospital, Chichester Health Authority.
- Pamela Doris, Mrs Stewart, President, Wiltshire Bridleway Association.
- Percy Garrod Stoker. For services to the handicapped in Derbyshire.
- James Stokes, D.F.C., lately Divisional Manager, West Midlands Passenger Transport Executive.
- Benjamin Victor Cecil Stone, Tax Officer (Higher Grade), Board of Inland Revenue.
- Miss Nellie Stone, Personal Secretary, Department of the Environment.
- Miss Nell Street. For services to the community in North Wales.
- Barbara Joan, Mrs Strong. For political and public service.
- Henry Leonard Stuckey, Plant Manager, Swansea, Ford Motor Company.
- Brian Taylor, Managing Director, Cascade (U.K.) Ltd.
- Hilda May, Mrs Thomas. For political and public service.
- John Reid Thomson, Site Manager, Balfour Beatty Construction Ltd.
- Thomas Thurlow, lately Higher Executive Officer, Department of Health and Social Security.
- Robert Lawrence Todd, Area Director, Commonwealth War Graves Commission.
- William Thomas Trinder, Architect, Northern Ireland Housing Executive.
- Doreen, Mrs Trust, Director, Disfigurement Guidance Centre, Cupar, Fife.
- Gordon Unett, Chief Commandant, Staffordshire Police Special Constabulary.
- Lawrence Arthur Walters, Senior Research Officer, Lucas Industries plc.
- George Terrance Ward, Leader, West Derbyshire District Council.
- Margaret, Mrs Waterhouse, Clerical Officer, Ministry of Agriculture, Fisheries and Food.
- Stanley Kenneth Wattam, Managing Director, Stanley Wattam Ltd.
- Michael Christian Wayland, Chief Inspector, Surrey Constabulary.
- Mary Rosina, Mrs Webb, Organiser, Aberdare Citizens' Advice Bureau.
- Miss Valerie Margaret Savage West, Deputy Director, Drama and Dance, The British Council.
- Grahame Walter White, Station Officer, London Fire Brigade.
- Miss Patricia Joan Whitehead, Officer for Dental Health Education and Recruitment, General Dental Council.
- Margaret, Mrs Whtteside, Higher Executive Officer, Department of Health and Social Security.
- The Reverend Harry Whittaker. For services to Youth in Northamptonshire.
- Major William Wilbur (Retired), lately Retired Officer II, Ministry of Defence.
- Miss Margaret Wilcock, lately Senior Administrative Officer, Pay Office, Lancashire Constabulary.
- Richard Gareth Thomas Williams, Higher Executive Officer, Manpower Services Commission.
- Caulfield Wilson, Head of Department of Applied Science, Belfast College of Technology.
- Donald Wilson, Museum Superintendent, Manchester Museum.
- Vera Cynthia, Mrs Woodcock, Area Careers Officer, Northern Area, Norfolk Careers Service.
- Silas Victor Woollin, Chief Emergency Planning Officer, West Yorkshire County Council.
- Noel Jocelyn, Mrs Wurr, lately Partner, Dore Elsey Wurr Associates.
- Miss Alice Janet Wyatt (Mrs Hanson), Head of Section for Independence through Education, City Literature Institute, London.
- Geoffrey Francis Yerbury, Higher Executive Officer, Board of Customs and Excise.
- Clifford Young, Assistant County Surveyor (Projects), Lancashire County Council.
- Anthony John Abbott, First Secretary and Consul, H.M. Embassy, Lisbon.
- Michael Leslie Alcock, Second Secretary, H.M. Embassy, Addis Ababa.
- Stephen Alexander Wallace Bowman, lately Government Engineer, Public Works Department, Hong Kong.
- Charles Thomas Canepa, Senior Port Pilot, Gibraltar.
- Miss Philippa Jane Carnall, Personal Secretary, H.M. Embassy, Damascus.
- Ian Campbell Carrott. For services to British commercial interests in Peking.
- Arthur Edward David Clarke, Deputy Treasurer, St Helena.
- Daniel Kevin Cullinan, Assistant Commissioner of Police, Botswana.
- Miss Carol Gauthie, Administration, Assistant, H.M. Embassy, Paris.
- Iris Ellen, Mrs Gerhardt, Personal Assistant, British Consulate-General, Osaka.
- Peter Gibson. For services to British commercial interests in Washington.
- Dr Elmiro Gusella, Vice-Consul, H.M. Embassy, Rome.
- Joyce Dallas, Mrs Hall. For welfare services to the community in Bermuda.
- Miss Theresa Jane Hamblin. For welfare services to the community in Calcutta.
- Pamela Joan, Mrs, Harvey. For services to the British community in Rio de Janeiro.
- Colin William Hoddinott, Second Secretary (Communications) British High Commission, New Delhi.
- Watkins Emmanuel Hodge. For services to the community in Anguilla.
- Dr Vincent McKinley John. For services to the community in Bermuda.
- Eric Ernest Jones, Communications Officer, H.M. Embassy, Addis Ababa.
- Richard Gwyn Jones, Second Secretary, H.M. Embassy, Prague.
- Alan Gilbert Knight. For services to education in the Turks and Caicos Islands.
- Anne Felicity Margaret, Mrs Lamrani, Nursing Sister, H.M. Embassy, Algiers.
- Miss Winifred Lesaffre, Librarian, British Consulate-General, Lille.
- Noman Leung Nai-pang, Regional Commander, Civil Aid Services, Hong Kong.
- David Low Shiu-kwong, Welfare Officer, Police Department, Hong Kong.
- Laurie Robert MacCulloch, lately Administrative Officer, Deputy Chief Secretary's Office, Hong Kong.
- Renee, Mrs McKenzie, Vice-Consul, British Consulate-General, Cape Town.
- Miss Mary Thomson Montgomery. For nursing and welfare services to the community in Zaire.
- The Very Reverend Anthony Lindsay Nind. For services to the British community in Switzerland.
- Leonard Thomas Oddie. For services to the British community in Brussels.
- John Leonard Parry, Communications Officer, H.M. Embassy, Ankara.
- James Arthur Pasquill. For services to the community in Zambia.
- Marta, Mrs Trefusis-Paynter. For services to journalism in Zambia.
- Roderick Allan MacGregor Ramsay. For services to British commercial and community interests in Indonesia.
- Miss Mary Agnes Ratter. For nursing and welfare services to the community in Zaire.
- Dorothy Wendy, Mrs Roberts. For services to the British community in the U.S.A.
- James Montgomery Ryan, District Commissioner, Lesser Islands, Cayman Islands.
- Michael Austin Slingsby. For services to housing development in India.
- Trevor Harley Stephenson. For services to British commercial interests in Peru.
- Miss Jean May Stevenson. Personal Assistant to H.M. Ambassador, Stockholm.
- Andrew John Raymond Timpson. For welfare services to! the community in East Africa.
- Kenneth Yuhung Tongson. For public services in Hong Kong.
- Norman Clement Tucker, Principal Government Engineer, New Town Development Office, Hong Kong.
- Alan James Turney. For services to education in Japan.
- Borhyen Wang, Superintendent of Mines, Public Works Department, Hong Kong.
- Cyril Lewis Walters, Permanent Secretary, Civil Service, British Virgin Islands.
- Miss Margaret Rosalind (Rose) Willock. For services to broadcasting in Montserrat.

Australian States

- Hilary Francis Chessher. For service to archery.
- Paul Fingereth. For service to the Jewish community.
- Raymond Gower Freeman. For service to the community.
- Con Galtos. For service to the community.
- Alan John Lemon. For service to the oil seed industry.
- Russell John McWilliam. For service to structural engineering.
- Kenneth John Madsen. For service to basketball.
- Jack Baxter Middleton. For service to the electrical industry.
- Kenneth James Moran. For service to the community and paraplegic sport.

=== Imperial Service Order (ISO) ===
- Robert Cellars Baldie, Senior Principal, Ministry of Defence.
- Frederick Brown, Senior Principal Scientific Officer, Department of Energy.
- Francis William Clarke, Principal, Ministry of Defence.
- Hugh Bernard Clarke, Senior Principal Scientific Officer, Ministry of Defence.
- John Corbett, lately Grade 6, Manpower Services Commission.
- John Bell Crompton, lately Principal Information Officer, Central Office of Information.
- John Richard Donnison, Official Receiver (A), Department of Trade and Industry.
- James Drummond, lately H.M. Deputy Chief Inspector of Prisons for Scotland.
- Gerald Arthur Archie Elmer, Principal, Board of Inland Revenue.
- John Findlater, lately Principal Scientific Officer, Meteorological Office.
- Kenneth Jackson, lately Senior Principal, Department of Health and Social Security.
- John Gilbert James, Principal Scientific Officer, Department of Transport.
- James Arthur Desmond Knight, Principal, Ministry of Defence.
- Geoffrey Law, Principal Scientific Officer, Ministry of Defence.
- Francis McNulty, Principal, Department of the Environment.
- Derek William Myers, lately Principal Collector, Board of Inland Revenue.
- Richard Donald Neale, Foreign and Commonwealth Office.
- Cyril John Parker, Principal, Department of Health and Social Security.
- John Herbert William Phillips, Inspector (SP), Board of Inland Revenue.
- Reginald Colin Stevens, Principal, Department of the Director of Public Prosecutions.
- William Waddington, Deputy Collector, Board of Customs and Excise.
- Hastings Woodmansey, Grade 6, Home Office.
- Thomas Leslie Young, lately Principal Professional Technology Officer, Department of the Environment for Northern Ireland.
- Hugh Gordon Ardley, J.P., Postmaster-General, Hong Kong.
- Harold Campbell Beaton, J.P., Principal Government Highways Engineer, Hong Kong.
- Dr James Williams Hayes, J.P., Deputy Secretary, New Territories Administration, Hong Kong.
- James Conley Prisk, Deputy Commissioner, Customs and Excise Department, Hong Kong.

=== British Empire Medal ===
Military Division

- Chief Petty Officer Aircrewman (Photographer) Thomas Peter Breuilly.
- Chief Air Engineering Mechanic (Ordnance) Timothy Andrew Martin Stovold Clark.
- Chief Petty Officer (Boatswain) Robert William Duncan, Royal Fleet Auxiliary Service.
- Chief Petty Officer Air Engineering Artificer (Weapon Electrical) Anthony Paul Dunn.
- Chief Radio Supervisor Brian George Evers.
- Marine John Henry Freeman, Royal Marines.
- Chief Communications Technician Mervyn John Greatbatch.
- Colour Sergeant (Local Warrant Officer 2) Edward Percy Greenberry, Royal Marines.
- Medical Technician 1st Class (Nurse Operating Mental) Brian Thomas Hart.
- Chief Petty Officer Marine Engineering Artificer Derek Enfield Howe.
- Chief Medical Technician (Laboratory) Robert John Iorns.
- Petty Officer (Local Acting Chief Petty Officer) (Diver) Michael James Sidney Mason.
- Chief Air Engineering Mechanic (Weapon) Barry Howard Melliss.
- Charge Chief Weapon Engineering Artificer (Action Data Control) Basil Watson Moran.
- Chief Petty Officer (Operations) (Tactical Systems) (Submarines) John Myers.
- Colour Sergeant Trevor Cyril Newstead, Royal Marines.
- Chief Petty Officer Weapon Engineering Artificer Alexander Cochrane Peebles.
- Chief Petty Officer Air Engineering Artificer (Radio) David Michael Smith.
- Chief Petty Officer (Acting Warrant Officer) (Operations) (Sonar) (Submarines) Kenneth Richard Stanbury.
- Chief Petty Officer Air Engineering Artificer (Radio) George Leslie Thomas.
- Chief Petty Officer Air Engineering Artificer (Mechanical) David Alan Warwick.
- Chief Petty Officer Stores Accountant David Whiting.
- Sergeant Bryan Alderson, 51st Highland Volunteers, Territorial Army.
- Sergeant Mohamed Aslam, Corps of Royal Electrical and Mechanical Engineers.
- Staff Sergeant David Emrys Bailey, Officers' Training Corps, Territorial Army.
- Corporal William Alexander Blaikie, Royal Corps of Signals.
- Sergeant Derek Bowden, Corps of Royal Engineers.
- Sergeant Richard Clarke Bracegirdle, Royal Corps of Signals.
- Staff Sergeant Lloyd Edward Brearey, Army Catering Corps.
- Sergeant Michael James Brown, Royal Regiment of Artillery.
- Sergeant John Campbell, The Royal Irish Rangers (27th (Inniskilling) 83rd and 87th).
- Corporal (Acting Sergeant) Ann Louise Carroll, Women's Royal Army Corps.
- Staff Sergeant John Edward Charles Clifton, The Royal Green Jackets, Territorial Army.
- Corporal (Acting Sergeant) James Peter Coffey, The Parachute Regiment.
- Sergeant Graeme Gordon Cossar, Royal Army Ordnance Corps.
- Corporal Keith Ross Crowton, The Queen's Own Hussars.
- Staff Sergeant George Croxford, The Queen's Regiment, Territorial Army.
- Staff Sergeant Daniel Edward Dennigan, The Queen's Lancashire Regiment, Territorial Army.
- Staff Sergeant Allen James Edmondson, Royal Army Ordnance Corps.
- Staff Sergeant Brian Edwards, The Royal Green Jackets.
- Staff Sergeant (now Warrant Officer Class 2) Edward Maximillian Elliot, The Wessex Regiment, Territorial Army.
- Staff Corporal Derek John Frazer, The Life Guards.
- Sergeant (Acting Staff Sergeant) Michael Keith Hammond, The Worcestershire and Sherwood Foresters Regiment.
- Staff Sergeant William Barclay Higgins, Army Catering Corps, Territorial Army.
- Staff Sergeant Frank Richard Hight, Coldstream Guards.
- Staff Sergeant (now Warrant Officer Class 2) Paul Christopher Holohan, Royal Army Ordnance Corps.
- Staff Sergeant Alan Robert Jones, The Royal Highland Fusiliers (Princess Margaret's Own Glasgow and Ayrshire Regiment).
- Sergeant Joseph Kelly, The Queen's Royal Irish Hussars.
- Bombardier Arthur Peter Lambert, Royal Regiment of Artillery, Territorial Army.
- Sergeant Richard Anthony Lawrence, Royal Army Ordnance Corps.
- Staff Sergeant Joseph Vincent Le Strange, The Duke of Edinburgh's Royal Regiment (Berkshire and Wiltshire).
- Sergeant Barrie Alan Lewis, Army Catering Corps.
- Staff Sergeant Robert David MacGregor Livingstone, The Royal Anglian Regiment.
- Sergeant Michael Vernon Lowery, Royal Army Ordnance Corps.
- Corporal James Wilson Lumsden, The Queen's Lancashire Regiment.
- Staff Sergeant Peter Mark Francis Lynch, Corps of Royal Electrical and Mechanical Engineers.
- Staff Sergeant James Frederick McCracken, The Royal Irish Rangers (27th (Inniskilling) 83rd and 87th), Territorial Army.
- Corporal Naranparsad Gurung, 2nd King Edward VII's Own Gurkha Rifles (The Sirmoor Rifles).
- Staff Sergeant Michael James O'Hara, The Royal Green Jackets.
- Sergeant John David Orton, Royal Army Pay Corps.
- Sergeant (now Acting Staff Sergeant) Antonio Tertuliano Pinto, Corps of Royal Electrical and Mechanical Engineers.
- Staff Sergeant Nicholas Jeffrey Bowman Powell, Intelligence Corps.
- Staff Sergeant William Price, Corps of Royal Military Police (now discharged).
- Staff Sergeant Richard Stewart Reed, Royal Army Medical Corps.
- Sergeant (Acting Staff Sergeant) Noel Phillip Shepherd, The Queen's Lancashire Regiment.
- Sergeant Alexander McPherson Stewart, The Black Watch (Royal Highland Regiment).
- Staff Sergeant (now Warrant Officer Class 2) Werner Kurt Stroud, Royal Army Pay Corps,
- Sergeant Patrick Tabony, Coldstream Guards.
- Bombardier (now Acting Sergeant) David Ernest George Thatcher, Royal Regiment of Artillery.
- Staff Sergeant (now Warrant Officer Class 2) Robert James Walton, Royal Corps of Signals.
- Staff Sergeant Thomas Arthur Warburton, Royal Army Ordnance Corps.
- Corporal Edward Wardle, Royal Army Pay Corps, Territorial Army.
- Lance Corporal Harry White, Corps of Royal Engineers.
- Sergeant Ivor James Wickens, Royal Regiment of Artillery.
- Sergeant Martin Richard Widdicombe, Royal Corps of Signals.
- Staff Sergeant (Acting Warrant Officer Class 2) David Alastair Williams, Welsh Guards.
- Sergeant Michael James Wilson, Royal Army Ordnance Corps.
- Lance Corporal Andrew Thomas Wootton, Royal Tank Regiment.
- Lance Corporal Bernard James Wragg, The Duke of Edinburgh's Royal Regiment (Berkshire and Wiltshire).
- Corporal Michael Christopher Wray, Royal Corps of Signals.
- Sergeant (Acting Staff Sergeant) Brian Arthur Young, Scots Guards.
- Sergeant Robert Kingsley Anderson, Royal Air Force.
- Sergeant Michael Douglas Balchin, Royal Air Force.
- Flight Sergeant John Gordon Bishop, Royal Air Force.
- Chief Technician Derrick Blakey, Royal Air Force.
- Sergeant Ian Stewart Carlin, Royal Air Force.
- Sergeant David George Chappell, Royal Air Force.
- Sergeant Kenneth Paul Dwyer Cooksley, Royal Air Force.
- Chief Technician dive Anthony Doran, Royal Air Force.
- Flight Sergeant Douglas Joe Fletcher, Royal Air Force.
- Chief Technician. Roger Edward Flitter, Royal Air Force.
- Sergeant Dennis John Harpham, Royal Air Force.
- Chief Technician Anthony Beaumont-Jones, Royal Air Force.
- Flight Sergeant Peter Edward Jones, Royal Air Force.
- Flight Sergeant Thomas Frederick Knox, Royal Air Force.
- Sergeant Robert Francis Lowe, Royal Air Force.
- Sergeant Kenneth William Marriott, Royal Air Force.
- Sergeant Anthony Duncan Moore, Royal Air Force.
- Sergeant Alan Murray, Royal Air Force.
- Sergeant Ian Geoffrey Nelson, Royal Air Force
- Chief Technician Thomas William Owen, Royal Air Force.
- Flight Sergeant David Arthur Rawcliffe, Royal Air Force.
- Flight Sergeant Barry Salt, Royal Air Force.
- Flight Sergeant Norman Rodney Shakespeare, Royal Air Force Regiment.
- Flight Sergeant Martin Gower Spence, Royal Air Force.
- Chief Technician Toby Julian Stickley, Royal Air Force.
- Flight Sergeant Bryan Peter Thornley, Royal Air Force.
- Chief Technician Robert Lloyd Watson, Royal Air Force.

Civil Division
United Kingdom

- Edward James Benjamin Adams. For services to the Greater Manchester Army Cadet Force.
- Matthew Aiken, Driver, Ulsterbus Ltd.
- Alexander Gowans Allan, Bible Class Leader, Glenochil Young Offenders Institution and Detention Centre.
- Thomas Frederick Allen, Refuse Supervisor, Strabane District Council.
- Jose Armolea, Production Superintendent, Smiths Industries Environmental Controls Company Ltd.
- Robert Armstrong, Grade 1 Deputy, Calverton Colliery, Nottinghamshire Area, National Coal Board.
- Douglas Gerald Arnold, Assistant Chemist, Rugby Portland Cement plc.
- Peter Donald Ashbey, Fitter, Metropolitan Police.
- Dominic Angelo Avo, lately Caretaker, Plasmarl County Primary School, Swansea.
- William Bamforth, Foreman, Mobile Maintenance Unit, North West Water Authority.
- Frederick Barter, T.D., Mayor's Officer, Bath City Council.
- Darrell Batey, Subpostmaster, Wigton Sub Office, The Post Office.
- William Baxendale, Driver, London Midland Region, British Railways.
- Harry Percy Baxter. For services to the Bradfield Club, Peckham, London.
- Elizabeth Marjorie, Mrs Belchamber, Member, Cornwall Branch, The British Red Cross Society.
- Jonathan Bigrigg. For services to the St John Ambulance Brigade in Egremont, Cumbria.
- James Blake, Auxiliary Coastguard in Charge, Ventnor, Isle of Wight.
- Gordon Jones Neil Boag, Sergeant, Lothian and Borders Police.
- John Bourke, Chargehand Welder, Freightliners Ltd, British Railways.
- William Robert Bowbrick, lately Experimental Worker 1, Warren Spring Laboratory, Department of Trade and Industry.
- Joan Crichton, Mrs Boyd. For services to the elderly in Duns and district, Berwickshire.
- George Alan Brown, Security Guard, West Burton Power Station, Midlands Region, Central Electricity Generating Board.
- Lizzie, Mrs Broxton. For services to the physically and sensorily handicapped in Burnley.
- Frederick William Buglass. For services to the community in Leverstock Green, Hertfordshire.
- Alan Eric Bunyan, lately Workshop Superintendent, Stanmore, Marconi Defence Systems Ltd.
- Isabel Ethel, Mrs Cable. For services to the National Council for Voluntary Organisations.
- Niall John Campbell. For services to piping.
- Robert Campbell Cargill, Chief Officer I, H.M. Prison Featherstone.
- Elsie Elizabeth, Mrs Carson, lately Nursing Auxiliary, Warrington District General Hospital, Warrington Health Authority.
- Mabel Violette, Mrs Carter, Foster Parent, Lambeth Social Services Department.
- Rodney Charles Chambers, lately Sergeant, Metropolitan Police.
- Leonard George Chivers, Waterman, Llanwern Works, BSC Strip Products Group.
- Anne, Mrs Clark, Member, Stockport, Women's Royal Voluntary Service.
- John Little Clark, Telephonist, Manpower Services Commission.
- Miss Winifred Marjory Clark. For services to the Guisborough Branch, British Polio Fellowship.
- Raymond Clarke, Warrant Officer, No. 212 (RISCA) Squadron, Air Training Corps.
- Tom Christopher Clarke, Site Service Manager, Wembley, Marconi Underwater Systems Ltd.
- Joseph Vivian Colltver, Constable, Devon and Cornwall Constabulary.
- Kenneth Francis Coombes, Civilian Security Officer Grade III, Ministry of Defence.
- Alec Bryan Thomas Cornick, Senior Draughtsman (C&R), Ordnance Survey.
- Winifred Anne, Mrs Coulson, School Crossing Patrol, Merseyside Police.
- John Alexander Curtis. For services to the community in Newcastle upon Tyne, particularly the bus industry.
- Robert William Cushnie, Highway Supervisor, Badenoch division, Highland Regional Council.
- Norman Daglish, Setter Experimental, Birtley, Royal Ordnance plc.
- Malcolm James William Dalrymple, Groundsman, Bedfordshire Police.
- Villoo, Mrs De Souza, lately Interpreter, Luton and Dunstable Hospital, South Bedfordshire Health Authority.
- Joseph Smith Dickson, Foreman, Northern Ireland Electricity Service.
- William James Doonan, Permanent Way Inspector, Northern Ireland Railways.
- Albert Peter Dovey, Chargehand, Sheet Metal Shop, Ruston Gas Turbines Ltd.
- William George Duffy. Driver, London Buses Ltd.
- Eric Durham, Coal Plant Foreman, Cottam Power Station, Midlands Region, Central Electricity Generating Board.
- Joan Margaret, Mrs Eastman, Assistant Quality Assurance Engineer, Marconi Defence Systems Ltd.
- George Edward Edwards. For services, to the community in Huytoni, Liverpool.
- Grace, Mrs Edwards, Messenger, Privy Council Office.
- Raymond George Ely, Production Superintendent, Laundry Services, British Airways.
- Margaret Dorothy, Mrs Emery. For services to the Parents and Friends Committee, Biggleswade Sea Cadet Corps Unit.
- Hilda Mary, Mrs Evans, Divisional Officer, Pontnewynydd, Gwent, St John Ambulance Brigade.
- Thomas Esmor Evans, lately Constable, North Wales Police.
- Roy Fallows, Craftsman) (Electrical Inspection), Merseyside and North Wales Electricity Board.
- James Ferguson, Government Telephonist, Ministry of Defence.
- Ronald Alexander Fisher, Assistant Superintendent, A B Machine Shop, Army Weapons Division, Stevenage, British Aerospace plc.
- Henry William Flanders, lately Head Porter, Midwifery and Health Visiting, United Kingdom Central Council for Nursing.
- Lavinia Muriel, Mrs Ford. For services to the Forces Help Society and Lord Roberts Workshops, Liverpool.
- Thomas Edward Gambles, lately Fitting Shop Superintendent, Rose Forgrove Ltd.
- Robert Garrett, Sub-Officer, Northamptonshire Fire Brigade.
- Peter Oliver Gates, Electrician Leading. Charge-hand, Ministry of Defence.
- Kenneth Gibbons, Chief Steward I, Ministry of Defence.
- John Raymond Gill, Planning Department Clerk, Smith's Dock Ltd.
- Michael Gelling, Process Technician, Esso Petroleum Company Ltd.
- Jeanie McLeod, Mrs Goggin, Member, Doncaster Metropolitan, Women's Royal Voluntary Service.
- Francis Gerard Gollogly, Assistant Supervisor, Department of the Environment, Northern Ireland.
- Norman Alexander Gooding, Leading Mason, Winchester Cathedral.
- Anthony Allan Grant, Head Waiter, Stafford Hotel, London S.W.1.
- David Nevin Gray, Constable, Royal Ulster Constabulary.
- Leslie Philip Gray, Fitter Chargehand, Ministry of Defence.
- Maurice Sewell Gray, Roadman/Driver, Durham County Council.
- Percy Leonard Greaves, Clerk, Wetherby Town Council.
- Miss Elizabeth Mary Greeley. For services to the handicapped in West London.
- Alexander Grierson, Assistant Commandant and Secretary, Bilston Glen Colliery Company, St Andrew's Ambulance Corps.
- Geoffrey Michael Grime, Surveyor, Ordnance Survey.
- Christine Anne, Mrs Groucutt. For services to the Gwent Association for the Blind.
- Ada Maria, Mrs Hailwood. For services to the community in Kirkby, Liverpool.
- John Gordon Hall, lately Employee, Poole Remploy.
- Margaret Rose, Mrs Hall, District Co-ordinator, Hertfordshire, The British Red Cross Society.
- Michael Edward Ronald Hampton, Constable, Hampshire Constabulary.
- Bernard Hardy, Caretaker, Hope Street Clinic, Grimsby Health Authority.
- Alan Harper, Buffer Depot Supervisor, LUWKA Storage Ltd.
- Dorothy Ethel, Mrs Harris, Foster Parent, West Sussex Social Services Department.
- George Albeit Harris, General Works Superintendent, Wychavon District Council.
- Francis Thomas John Haynes, Museum Technician I, Public Records Office.
- Francis Henry, Cleaner, Department of Health and Social Security.
- Peter James Hern, Process and General Supervisory B, Ministry of Defence.
- James Henry Higgins, Production Manager, Industrial Systems, Pye Unicam Ltd.
- Charles William Henry Hills, Berthing Master, Baxter Fell and Company (Tower Wharf) Ltd.
- John Edward Himing, Constable, Metropolitan Police.
- Edwin Howard, lately Constable, Greater Manchester Police.
- David Oliver Hughes. For services to the cockle industry hi West Glamorgan.
- Peter John Hurll, Technician 2A, London South East, British Telecommunications plc.
- John Ellison Johnston, Senior Berthing Master, Belfast Harbour Commissioners.
- Robert Johnstone, Head Groundsman, Hamilton Park Racecourse.
- Ronald Henry Jones, Train Operator, London Underground Ltd.
- Leyland Roy Joyner. Sergeant, Warwickshire Constabulary.
- Bernard Wilfred Dudley Kemp, Retained Sub-Officer, Suffolk Fire Service.
- Miss Jean Kerrigan. For services to the elderly in Liverpool.
- Ronald Kitchen, Manager, Quality Division, GEC Research Ltd.
- George David Lake, Ship Ganger, Port of London Authority.
- Thomas George Lamb. For services to the community in Dyfed.
- William John Philip Langrish, Foreign and Commonwealth Office.
- Elsie May, Mrs Lawrenson, Prison Canteen Organiser, Lancashire, Women's Royal Voluntary Service.
- Rose Francis Jessie, Mrs Little, Subpostmistress, Broadley Common Rural Sub Office, The Post Office.
- John Logue, Leading Fireman, Mid-Glamorgan Fire Brigade.
- James Lord, General Underground Duties, Agecroft Colliery, Western Area, National Coal Board.
- Samuel James Lyle, Supervisor, Department of Agriculture, Northern Ireland.
- Patrick John McArdle, Sub-Officer, Fire Authority for Northern. Ireland.
- Leonard McCreanor. For services to the Royal British Legion in Co. Armagh.
- Archibald MacDonald, Tugmaster, Clyde Shipping Company.
- Duncan Malcolm MacDonald. For services to the community in Uig, Isle of Lewis.
- Joseph McHugh, lately Professional and Technology Officer, Ministry of Defence.
- Alistair Hugh Crawford McIvor, Constable, Royal Ulster Constabulary.
- Albert Edward McKee, lately Foreman, Sheet Metal Shop, Gec-McMichael Ltd.
- Mary Dagmar, Mrs Mackinnon. For services to the Wakefield Social Services Department.
- Robert Macleod, Secretary, Sutherland Sheepdog Trials Association.
- Sinclair Macleod, Contract Ambulance Driver, Scottish Ambulance Service.
- James McMorris, Driver, Western Health and Social Services Board.
- Robert Charles Joseph McMullen, lately Professional and Technology Officer, Ministry of Defence.
- Joseph Leander Munro MacNally, Ranger and Naturalist, Torridon, National Trust for Scotland.
- John McWilliams, Service Engineer, Scottish Region, British Gas Corporation.
- Madelaine Daphne Swanson, Mrs Maisey, Purchasing and Supplies Organiser, Women's Royal Voluntary Service.
- John Edward Bertram Marriott. For services to the community in Sevenoaks, Kent.
- Donald Walter Martin, Grade 1 Deputy, Mansfield Colliery, North Notts Area, National Coal Board.
- David John Mathias, Process and General Supervisory B, Ministry of Defence.
- Miss Isobel Carson Matthews, Chief Observer, Armagh Post, No. 31 Group, Royal Observer Corps.
- Leopold William John Maycock, Senior Operating Department Assistant, Newmarket General Hospital, West Suffolk Health Authority.
- George William Middleton, Senior Packaging Machine Trainer, Lipton Export Ltd.
- Joseph Miller, Supervisor, Plant Lining, MacLellan Rubber Ltd., Glasgow.
- Marjorie Blanche, Mrs Mills, Organiser, Upton Hospital, Slough, Women's Royal Voluntary Service.
- Kenneth William Monti, Fitter, Central Engineering Department, BSC Shotton Works.
- Joseph Henry Moore, Coal and Ash Plant Attendant, Ratcliffe-on-Soar Power Station, Midlands Region, Central Electricity Generating Board.
- Robert Gamble Moore, Chief Officer I, Northern Ireland Prison Service.
- John Kirk Morrison, Constable, Royal Ulster Constabulary.
- Vivien, Mrs Mullin, Work-study Adviser, L S and J Sussman (Barnstaple) Ltd.
- Miss Mary Mulvey, lately Works Manager, Rigid Packaging, Packaging Division, Robinson and Sons Ltd.
- David Murray, Constable, Central Scotland Police.
- James Neill, Senior Officer, Northern Ireland Prison Service.
- Ivy Beatrice, Mrs Neville. For services to the community in Irthlingborough, Northamptonshire.
- John Nicholls, Constable, North Yorkshire Police.
- Eileen, Mrs Nixon, Secretary, Cleveland Branch, Middlesbrough Division, Soldiers' Sailors' and Airmen's Families Association.
- Gweny, Mrs Nixon, Area Staff Officer, Sheffield Branch, St John Ambulance Brigade.
- Patrick Frank O'donnell, M.C., Convenor, Cape Building Products Ltd.
- Gloria Constance, Mrs Ogden, Paperkeeper, Home Office.
- John Arthur Onslow, Technical Qerk, North Thames Region, British Gas Corporation.
- William Derek Pearce, Professional and Technology Officer, Ministry of Defence.
- Peter Pow Penman, Craft Auxiliary B, Scottish Development Department.
- Joseph Adrian Rajab Peru, Office Keeper 1A, Department of Trade and Industry.
- Miss Margaret Leonora Rachel Phillips. For services to the National Society for Prevention of Cruelty to Children in Cardiff.
- Jennie, Mrs, Pidgeon, Centre Nursing Officer, Dorset Branch, British Red Cross Society.
- James Pilling, Site Superintendent, Refuse Department, Greater Manchester Council.
- Bertram Thomas Polley, Workshop Superintendent, Southern Water Authority.
- Alan Hedderwick Potter, Subpostmaster, Pathhead Sub Office, Kirkcaldy, The Post Office.
- John Burns Price, Principal Officer, H.M. Prison Lancaster.
- Dick Proudfoot, Brigade Engineer, Norfolk Fire Brigade.
- Arthur Frederick Perris Rigby, Leading Observer, No. 23 Group, Durham, Royal Observer Corps.
- Thomas Barnett Robinson, Sub-Officer, Fire Authority for Northern Ireland.
- Anthony Bernard Rolf, Patrol Service Inspector, Isle of Wight, Automobile Association.
- Miss Eva Seddon, Secretary, Liverpool Committee, National Society for Cancer Relief.
- Levi Shepherd. For services to the community in Hebden Bridge, West Yorkshire.
- Frank Harold Smith, Reader (Printing), Metropolitan Police.
- James McGowan Smith, Estate Foreman, West of Scotland Agricultural College.
- John William Smith, Professional and Technology Officer, Department of the Environment.
- Joan Mary Rhoda, Mrs, Spence, Auxiliary Postwoman, Ampleforth College, The Post Office.
- Derek George Stalley, Chargehand Fitter, Ipswich City Transport.
- Jack Stansfield, Chargehand, BTR Industries.
- Leonard Albert Steedman, Head Warder, Duxford Airfield, Imperial War Museum.
- Beatrice Christina, Mrs Stevens. For services to the community in Stretham, Cambridgeshire.
- Clifford John Stokes, lately Station Officer, Solent Maritime Rescue Sub-Centre, H.M. Coastguard.
- Raymond Sweet, Shift Charge Engineer (Mechanical), Baddesley Colliery, South Midlands Area, National Coal Board.
- Showty Sylvester, Area Supervisor, Bakerloo, Jubilee and Central Lines, London Underground Ltd.
- Frederick Kenneth Symonds, Compressor Operator, Birds Eye Wall's Ltd.
- Waclaw Szmidt, lately First Line Supervisor, Lincoln Division, Anglian Water Authority.
- John Alfred St Clair Tait, Staff Sergeant, Orkney Independent Battery, Army Cadet Force.
- David James Thomas, Transmitter Technician, Wenvoe Transmitting Station, British Broadcasting Corporation.
- John Young Thomson, Sergeant, Royal Botanic Garden, Edinburgh, Department of Agriculture and Fisheries for Scotland.
- Reginald James Tillbrook, Cartographic Draughtsman, Ministry of Defence.
- Ronald Francis Tillett, Professional and Technology Officer, Ministry of Defence.
- Horace Mervyn Tovey, lately Supervisor, Home Loan Equipment Service, Gwent Health Authority.
- Frank William Veale, Service Engineer, North Thames Region, British Gas Corporation.
- Doreen Hayes, Mrs Vesey, County Good Companions Organiser, Bedfordshire, Women's Royal Voluntary Service.
- James Thomas Wade, Head Caretaker, Rothamsted Experimental Station, Agricultural and Food Research Council.
- Henry Donald Wakefield, Copy Lathe Turner, Experimental Machine Shop, Dowty Rotol Ltd.
- Stanley Albert Ward, Range Worker I, Ministry of Defence.
- Julia Frances, Mrs Watson, Foster Parent, Hertfordshire Social Services Department.
- Michael Harry John Webb, Professional and Technology Officer (Mechanical), Ministry of Defence.
- James William West, lately Craft Chargehand (Carpenter), Department of the Environment.
- Morva Joyce, Mrs White, Clothing Organiser, Salisbury Women's Royal Voluntary Service.
- Peter White, Foreign and Commonwealth Office.
- Arthur Leonard Williams. For services to horticulture in Stratford-upon-Avon and district.
- Thomas Williamson, Blacksmith, Lothian and Borders Fire Brigade.
- Yuen, Sir Tsin, Laundryman and Tailor, Ministry of Defence.

Australian States

- Winifred Pauline, Mrs. Buzza. For service to the community.
- Henrietta Helen, Mrs. Cant. For service to the community.
- Norma Ellen, Mrs. Darra. For service to the community.
- John Arthur Harris. For service to the community.
- William Joseph Lock. For service to the community.
- Bernard Francis Luton. For service to the community.
- Leonard Richard McManus. For service to the community.
- Annie May, Mrs. Mathison. For service to the community.
- Benjamin Harold Robertson, Superintendent, Queensland Police Force.
- Florence Catherine, Mrs. Stanley. For service to pony clubs.
- Dulcie May, Mrs. Penberthy. For service to the community.
- Gwendolyn May, Mrs. Welford. For service to the community.

Overseas Territories

- Miss Maruja Azzopardi. For public and community services in Gibraltar.
- John Victor Bosano, Charge Nurse, Medical and Health Services, Gibraltar.
- Benjamin Norman Christian, Secretary, Island Council, Pitcairn Island.
- Lionel Spencer Constantine, Butler, Government House, St Helena.
- Hu Ping-chao, Clerical Officer II, New Territories Department, Hong Kong.
- Ip Pak-kwan, Superintendent of Posts, Postal Services, Hong Kong.
- Megan Mrs McIntosh, Senior Personal Secretary, Police Department, Hong Kong.
- James Gray Nanton. For community services in Montserrat.
- Miss Isabel Nuñez, Headteacher, Education Department, Gibraltar.
- Gretna Evangelyn, Mrs Rankine, Teacher Grade I, Education Department, Cayman Islands.
- Sit Sang, Ward Attendant, Health Department, Hong Kong.
- Wan Chung-ping, Group Supervisor, Auxiliary Medical Services, Hong Kong.

=== Royal Red Cross ===
==== Member of the Royal Red Cross (RRC) ====
- Major (Acting Lieutenant Colonel) Rosalie Beckett, Queen Alexandra's Royal Army Nursing Corps.
- Lieutenant Colonel Patricia Ann Downie, Queen Alexandra's Royal Army Nursing Corps, Territorial Army.
- Lieutenant Colonel Christine Brenda Hough, T.D., Queen Alexandra's Royal Army Nursing Corps, Territorial Army.
- Group Captain Sheila Margaret Firth, A.R.R.C. Princess Mary's Royal Air Force Nursing Service.

==== Associate of the Royal Red Cross (ARRC) ====
- Warrant Officer Class 2 Ann Patricia Frazer, Queen Alexandra's Royal Army Nursing Corps.
- Major Mary Brigid Lynott, Queen Alexandra's Royal Army Nursing Corps (now retired).

=== Air Force Cross (AFC) ===
- Lieutenant Commander Stuart Douglas Pendrich, Royal Navy.
- Flight Lieutenant Paul Hartfield Gausden, Royal Air Force (now Squadron Leader).
- Squadron Leader Malcolm Victor Godfrey, Royal Air Force.
- Flight Lieutenant Mark William James Hare, Royal Air Force (now Squadron Leader).
- Squadron Leader Barry Charles Holding, Royal Air Force.
- Squadron Leader Russell Alan Ingham, Royal Air Force.
- Wing Commander John Gerald Lumsden, O.B.E., Royal Air Force.

=== Air Force Medal (AFM) ===
- Chief Petty Officer Aircrewman David Parrott.

=== Queen's Police Medal for Distinguished Service (QPM) ===
England and Wales

- David Michael Burke, Deputy Chief Constable, Warwickshire Constabulary.
- John Conboy, Detective Chief Superintendent, West Yorkshire Metropolitan Police.
- Alan Dyer, Chief Constable, Bedfordshire Police.
- John Owen Evans, Assistant Chief Constable, Dyfed-Powys Police.
- William Alexander Gibson, Commander, Metropolitan Police.
- Michael Frederick Holford, Chief Superintendent, Nottinghamshire Constabulary.
- Ralph Lees, Assistant Chief Constable Greater Manchester Police.
- Alexander Edward Marnoch, Commander, Metropolitan Police.
- Kenneth Joseph Merton, Commander, Metropolitan Police.
- Keith George Milner, Detective Chief Superintendent, Thames Valley Police.
- Edward Mitchell, Commander, Metropolitan Police.
- John Arthur Nesbit, Chief Superintendent, South Yorkshire Police.
- John Frederick Reece, Chief Superintendent, Sussex Police.
- John Fenwick Richards, Chief Superintendent, Devon and Cornwall Constabulary.
- Alan Oliver Smith, Chief Constable, Derbyshire Constabulary.

Northern Ireland

- David Gordon Armstrong, Sergeant, Royal Ulster Constabulary.
- Wilfred George Monahan, Assistant Chief Constable, Royal Ulster Constabulary.

Hong Kong

- Philip Davies, C.P.M., Chief Superintendent, Royal Hong Kong Police Force.

Scotland

- David William Robertson Whittet, Chief Superintendent, Tayside Police.
- John Hugh McCallum Mackerracher, Chief Superintendent, Strathclyde Police.

Australia

- Graeme Robert Joseph Parker, Assistant Commissioner, Queensland Police Force.

=== Queen's Fire Service Medal for Distinguished Service ===
England and Wales

- Norman Blakey, Assistant Chief Officer, Leicestershire Fire Service.
- Ronald Brown, Senior Divisional Officer, London Fire Brigade.
- William Charles Coombes, Assistant Chief Officer, West Midlands Fire Service.
- Colin Francis McManus, Deputy Chief Officer, Greater Manchester Fire Service.
- Michael Rogers, Chief Fire Officer, West Sussex Fire Brigade.
- Richard John Smythe, Senior Divisional Officer, Cambridgeshire Fire and Rescue Service.
- Roy Snarey, Assistant Chief Officer, London Fire Brigade.

Scotland

- John Livingston Hales, Deputy Firemaster, Strathclyde Fire Brigade.

=== Colonial Police Medal for Meritorious Service ===
- Timothy Francis Babington, Senior Superintendent, Royal Hong Kong Police Force.
- Cheng Bun, Principal Fireman, Hong Kong Fire Services.
- Custerfield Desmond Crockwell, Inspector, Bermuda Police Force.
- Ronald Frederick Curlewis, Senior Superintendent, Royal Hong Kong Police Force.
- Rudolph Dillinger Evans, Deputy Commissioner, Royal Cayman Islands Police Force.
- Robert Michael Anslow Harper, Senior Superintendent, Royal Hong Kong Police Force.
- Robin Henagulph, Chief Inspector, Bermuda Police Force.
- David Martin Hodson, Senior Superintendent, Royal Hong Kong Police Force.
- Gerald Everald James, Chief Inspector, Bermuda Police Force.
- Ko Mun-hang, Station Sergeant, Royal Hong Kong Police Force.
- Lee King-chung, Senior Divisional Officer, Hong Kong Fire Services.
- Lee Yu-yin, Chief Inspector, Royal Hong Kong Police Force.
- Anton Livermore, Sergeant, Falkland Islands Police Force.
- Ernest Podesta, Assistant Divisional Officer, Gibraltar City Fire Brigade.
- Ng Chun-fai, Chief Inspector, Royal Hong Kong Police Force.
- Elliott McNeal Richardson, Deputy Superintendent, Anguilla Police Force.
- Tang Siu, Senior Divisional Officer, Hong Kong Fire Services.
- Lionel Stanley Triay, Inspector, Gibraltar Police Force.
- Wong Man-chiu, Senior Divisional Officer, Hong Kong Fire Services.
- Wong Leung, Mrs Kam-shan, Woman Senior Superintendent, Royal Hong Kong Police Force.
- Yau Ah-fuk, Sergeant, Royal Hong Kong Police Force.
- Yuen Yun-lam, Station Sergeant, Royal Hong Kong Police Force.
- Yung Po-wah, Senior Ambulance Officer, Hong Kong Fire Services.

=== Queen's Commendation for Valuable Service in the Air ===
- Lieutenant Commander Hector Roy Cowan, Royal Navy.
- Lieutenant Commander Robin Harvey Spencer Everall, Royal Navy.
- Warrant Officer Class 2 Michael George Ashton, Corps of Royal Electrical and Mechanical Engineers.
- Major Stuart Wells Slade, Army Air Corps.
- Squadron Leader Harry Terence Cook, Royal Air Force.
- Group Captain Christopher Charles Cotton Coville, Royal Air Force.
- Flight Lieutenant Colin Leslie Davis, Royal Air Force.
- Flight Lieutenant Nicholas Simon Francis Gilchrist, Royal Air Force.
- Squadron Leader Graham Bruce Gray, Royal Air Force.
- Wing Commander John Barrington Grogan, Royal Air Force.
- Squadron Leader Terence Patrick Newman, Royal Air Force.
- Flight Lieutenant Martin Richard Pitt, Royal Air Force.
- Squadron Leader Alan John Pulfrey, Royal Air Force.
- Squadron Leader Gerald William Rippin, Royal Air Force.
- Flight Lieutenant Philip Christopher Alan Whitbread, Royal Air Force.
- George Martin McAuley, Deputy Chief Navigator, Military Aircraft Division, Warton, British Aerospace plc.

== Cook Islands ==
=== Order of the British Empire ===
==== Officer of the Order of the British Empire (OBE) ====
Civil Division

- Tangata Tapuni Simiona. For public services.

=== British Empire Medal (BEM) ===
Civil Division

- Munokoa-Tini Ngari JP. For services to agriculture and the community.
