= Christopher Foster (economist) =

British economist (1930–2022)

Sir Christopher David Foster (30 October 1930 – 18 February 2022) was a British academic at the University of Oxford and MIT, a professor of economics at the London School of Economics, a consultant at Coopers & Lybrand and PricewaterhouseCoopers, and a temporary civil servant.

== Life and career ==
Christopher David Foster was born in Paddington, London on 30 October 1930. He was educated at Merchant Taylors' School, Northwood and King's College, Cambridge, where he read History and Economics. Afterwards, he spent a year as a Harkness fellow at the University of Pennsylvania, before embarking on a career as an economics don at the University of Manchester and Jesus College, Oxford, where he led a team studying urban transport problems at the Oxford Institute of Economics and Statistics. In 1970 he moved to the LSE, eventually rising to become Professor of Urban Studies and Economics.

In 1966 he took leave from his academic career to take up the role of Director-General of Economic Planning at the Ministry of Transport, serving as a special adviser to Cabinet minister Barbara Castle. He was also close to several other leading Labour politicians, working alongside the likes of Anthony Crosland, Richard Marsh, and Peter Shore. He advised Conservative ministers during the Thatcher era on Poll tax and rail privatization, as well as many other more successful endeavours. He sat on several private and public sector boards including the Audit Commission, the ESRC, the London Docklands Development Corporation and the Megaw Committee on Civil Service Pay.

He wrote books on transport, local government finance, privatization and public ownership, and the public sector. His last book was British Government in Crisis, which was published in March 2005.

On 25 November 2007, Foster gave an outspoken interview to Rachel Sylvester and Alice Thomson of The Daily Telegraph attacking Tony Blair as the 'worst Prime Minister since Lord North' in terms of how he managed government.

Foster chaired a cross-party 'Better Government Initiative' which is seen by some as a group of Establishment figures, mainly ex-senior civil servants. They apparently met in secret and their deliberations are to be released in a series of reports over the next few months with the first to be published immediately. The Telegraph revealed that "Government departments have "serious deficiencies"; the combined output of Parliament and the executive contain "too many disappointments and failures"; and "emphasis on 'management' has led to more bureaucracy at the expense of substance" in the Foreign Office."

He was created a Knight Bachelor in the 1986 Birthday Honours.

Foster died at home in Kensington, London, on 18 February 2022, at the age of 91.
