= Alan Bailey =

British civil servant (1931–2023)

Sir Alan Bailey
- Born: 26 June 1931; Rushden, Northamptonshire, England
- Died: 22 April 2023 (aged 91)
- Occupation: Civil servant

Sir Alan Marshall Bailey KCB (26 June 1931 – 22 April 2023) was a British civil servant.

== Biography ==
Born in Rushden, Northamptonshire on 26 June 1931, Sir Alan Bailey was educated at Bedford School, at St John's College, Oxford and at Merton College, Oxford. He was Principal Private Secretary to the Chancellor of the Exchequer between 1971 and 1973, Under Secretary at HM Treasury between 1973 and 1978, Deputy Secretary at HM Treasury between 1978 and 1983, Permanent Secretary at HM Treasury between 1983 and 1985, and Permanent Secretary at the Department for Transport between 1986 and 1991. He was an Honorary Fellow of St John's College, Oxford.

Bailey was appointed a Companion of the Order of the Bath (CB) in the 1982 New Year Honours and was promoted to Knight Commander (KCB) in the 1986 Birthday Honours.

Bailey died on 22 April 2023, at the age of 91.
