= David Galton =

British physician

Professor David Galton CBE, FRCP
- Born: David Abraham Goitein Galton; 1 March 1922; London, England
- Died: 28 November 2006
- Occupations: Physician; Haematologist

David Abraham Goitein Galton CBE FRCP (1922-2006) was a British physician, specialising in haematology.

Galton was born on 1 March 1922 in London, the son of a GP, Bernard, a Hungarian immigrant who had changed his surname from Goitein.

He studied medicine at Hackney Downs School (formerly The Grocers' Company's School) followed by Trinity College, Cambridge, and at University College Hospital, graduating in 1946.

He was Professor of Haemato-Oncology in the University of London at the Royal Postgraduate Medical School and Honorary Consultant Physician at the Hammersmith Hospital.

He served as secretary to the Medical Research Council's working party on leukaemia, and later chaired its working party on leukaemia in adults, and its steering Committee on Leukaemia.

He also served as Honorary Director of the MRC's Leukaemia Unit and Leukaemia Research Fund.

He was a Fellow of the Royal College of Physicians (FRCP) and was made a Commander of the Order of the British Empire (CBE) in the 1986 Birthday Honours.

He died on 28 November 2006. A collection of his papers is held at the Wellcome Library in London.
