= John Salisse =

English businessman and magician

John Joseph Salisse CBE (24 March 1926 in Bournemouth − 26 September 2006 in Hampstead, London) was a director of Marks & Spencer from 1968 to 1985, and amateur magician.

Salisse was educated at Portsmouth Grammar School. He joined Marks & Spencer in 1944. He was the first non-Jew to be elected to the company board.

Salisse was a magician and author, who served The Magic Circle as their Honorary Secretary and Vice-President. He had a particular interest in Jasper Maskelyne.

He was married to Meg for 57 years until his death. They had one daughter.
