= Wendy Mitchell =

British nurse, politician, public servant (1932–1999)

Dame Wendy Mitchell DBE
- Born: Wendy Dell; 14 September 1932; London, England
- Died: 3 July 1999 (aged 66); London, England
- Occupations: Nurse, midwife, politician, public servant
- Spouse: Anthony Mitchell (m. 1963)
- Children: 2

Dame Wendy Mitchell DBE (née Dell; 14 September 1932 – 3 July 1999) was a British nurse, midwife, politician and public servant.

== Biography ==
Wendy Mitchell (née Dell) was educated at Heathfield House Roman Catholic School in Cardiff (later merged into St Illtyd's Catholic High School), then qualified as a nurse at Cardiff Royal Infirmary, and midwifery at St David's Hospital and Queen's Institute, Cardiff. She was a member of the South East Thames Regional Health Authority (1986–94) and the South Thames Regional Health Authority (1994–96), where she used her professional nursing knowledge to inform the discussions. She continued her nursing career for the rest of her life.

She became involved in politics and was a local councillor in Greenwich for 20 years (1974–94). She was Chairman (1974–77) and President (1988–91) of the West Woolwich (Eltham) Conservative Association; a member of the Greater London Area Conservative Women's Committee (1983–86), then a member of the Women's National Committee (1987–90) and Deputy Chairman of the Greater London Area Conservative Executive (1987). She chaired the Conservative Party conference in 1993.

== Honours ==
Mitchell was appointed an OBE in 1986 for political and public service, and advanced to DBE in 1992, again for political and public service.

== Personal life and death ==
In 1963, she married Anthony Mitchell. They had two children, Simon and Judith. Dame Wendy Mitchell died on 3 July 1999, aged 66, after a battle with cancer.
