= Stuart Carne =

Dr Stuart Carne CBE FRCGP
- Born: Stuart John Carne; 19 June 1926 (age 100); London, England
- Education: Middlesex Hospital Medical School
- Occupation: General practitioner (retired)
- Spouse: Yolande Carne (m. 1951; died 2019)
- Children: four

Stuart John Carne CBE FRCGP (born 19 June 1926) is a retired British general medical practitioner.

== Early life and education ==
Stuart Carne was born in London to Bernard and Millicent Carne. He attended Willesden County Grammar School and graduated from Middlesex Hospital Medical School in 1951.

== Personal life ==
On 16 December 1951, Carne married Yolande Cooper. They have four children and three grandchildren.

== Medical career ==
Carne founded the Grove Health Centre in Goldhawk Road, Shepherd's Bush, London in 1967, which was opened by the Minister of Health, Kenneth Robinson, and from the start it proved to be a success. At the time, the building was regarded as a model of its kind and the practice is still running at new, modern premises around the corner at Richford Gate.

In 1970, Carne was appointed senior tutor in general practice at the Royal Postgraduate Medical School at Hammersmith Hospital.

In 1976, Carne was elected president of the World Organization of National Colleges, Academies (WONCA). He was elected president of the Royal College of General Practitioners in 1988, in which role he was succeeded by the Prince of Wales in 1991. He was chairman of the Standing Medical Advisory Committee (1982-1986), chairman of the Joint Committee on Contraception (1983-1986), honorary civil consultant in general practice to the RAF (1974- ), president of the Section of General Practice of the Royal Society of Medicine (1973-1974) and an examiner in medicine at the Society of Apothecaries (1980-1988).

== Honours and awards ==
Carne was appointed OBE in 1977 and CBE in 1986.

== Other posts ==
In 1959, Carne became honorary medical officer to the Queens Park Rangers Football Club, a position he held for thirty years until retiring in 1989 when he was appointed vice-president of the club.

== Published work ==
- Paediatric Care: Child Health in Family Practice (1976) ISBN 9780397582167
