= Better Government Initiative =

Better Government Initiative was established in 2007 as a response to growing concern about the poor quality of formation and implementation of government policies in the United Kingdom. It is an informal politically neutral group made up primarily of former senior public servants.

It has worked with representatives of all three main UK political parties in developing proposals for improving the operations of government and enhancing the accountability of the executive to Parliament. In January 2010 it published a series of recommendations for reform in the report, "Good Government: Reforming Parliament and the Executive." This was followed in November 2012 by a further report, "Good Government: Mid Term Review", assessing progress halfway through the coalition government's term of office. Its recommendations are concerned with the processes and procedures for developing and implementing government legislation and other policies, not with the political merits of the proposals themselves.
