= List of Old Bristolians =

The following are some notable "Old Bristolians", alumni of Bristol Grammar School in England.

== 17th century ==
- Robert Huntington (c.1637–1701), Provost of Trinity College, Dublin and orientalist

== 18th century ==
- Alexander Catcott (1725–1779), geologist and theologian
- Sir John Coxe Hippisley (1745–1825), politician
- William Gregor (1761–1817), mineralogist, discoverer of titanium
- Jonathan Sewell (c.1766–1839), Chief Justice and Speaker of the Legislative Council of Lower Canada, 1808–1839, and President of the Executive Council of Lower Canada, 1808–1830
- Stephen Sewell (1770–1832), lawyer and political figure in Lower Canada
- John Tobin (1770–1804), dramatist
- Samuel Daniel Broughton (1787–1837), military surgeon
- Thomas Edward Bowdich (c.1791–1824), writer and African explorer

== 19th century ==
- Thomas William Allies (1813–1903), theologian
- Charles Kingsley (1819–1875), novelist
- John Norton (1823–1904), architect
- Robert Drew Hicks (1850–1929), classicist
- Charles Whibley (1859–1930), journalist and author
- Thomas Horrocks Openshaw (1856–1929), surgeon
- William Lane (1861–1917), journalist and pioneer of the Australian labour movement
- Leonard Whibley (1863–1941), classicist
- Sir Llewellyn Smith (1864–1945), Permanent Secretary of the Board of Trade, 1907–1919, and Chief Economic Adviser to the Government, 1919–1927
- Leonard Raven-Hill (1867–1942), illustrator and cartoonist
- Sir John Herbert Parsons FRS (1868–1957), ophthalmologist and physiologist
- Robert Chambers (1802–1871), philanthropist and peace activist
- Roland Allen (1868–1947), missionary in China
- Cyril Bradley Rootham (1875–1938), classicist and musician
- Frederick William Lumsden (1872–1918), Royal Marines Brigadier General, VC, CB and DSO & Three bars
- Sir Cyril Norwood (1875–1956) classicist and Politician
- Sir Douglas Veale (1891–1973), Registrar of the University of Oxford, 1930–1958

== 20th century ==
- Sir Allen Lane (1902–1970), founder of Penguin Books
- Ronald Alley (1926–1999), British art historian and keeper of the modern collection at the Tate from 1965 to 1986
- Douglas Cleverdon (1903–1987), bookseller and BBC Radio producer
- Sarah Crew, Chief Constable in Bristol & Somerset from 2021.
- Sir Ivor Jennings (1903–1965), Downing Professor of the Laws of England, University of Cambridge, 1962–1965
- Paul Drury (1903–1987), artist
- Oliver Franks, Baron Franks (1905–1992), philosopher, diplomat and civil servant
- Sir Richard Sheppard (1910–1982), architect
- Douglas Russell Feaver (1914–1987), Bishop of Peterborough
- John Cosh (1915–2005), rheumatologist
- Geoffrey Keen (1916–2005), actor
- Sir John Pople (1925–2004), Mathematician, Theoretical chemist and Nobel Laureate
- Peter Nichols (1927–2019), writer
- Peter Mathias (1928–2016), economic historian
- Robert MacEwen (1928–2013), Scotland international rugby union player
- Richard Lynn (born 1930), psychologist
- Philip French (1933–2015), film critic and radio producer
- Timothy West (born 1934), actor
- Glen Dudbridge (1935–2017), sinologist
- Robin Cormack (born 1935), academic
- Julian Glover (born 1935), actor
- David Prowse (born 1935), actor
- Victor Watts (born 1938), academic
- Keith Robbins (born 1940), historian and former Vice-Chancellor of the University of Wales, Lampeter
- Fred Wedlock (1942–2010), folk singer, humorist and actor.
- T.J. Clark (born 1943), historian
- Nick Brimble (born 1944), actor
- Robert Lacey (born 1944), historian and biographer
- Sir Nicholas Wright (born 1945), professor of medicine
- Jeremy Treglown (born 1946), biographer and literary critic
- Andrew Dalby (born 1947), food writer
- Clive Ponting (born 1947), former civil servant and historian.
- David Nutt (born 1951), neuropsychopharmacologist
- Sir Andrew Cash (born 1955), Chief Executive of Sheffield Teaching Hospitals NHS Foundation Trust
- Timothy Holroyde (born 1955), English Court of Appeal judge
- Jeremy Sheehy (born 1956), Anglican priest and academic
- Andy Harrison (born 1957), business executive and former CEO of The RAC, easyJet and Whitbread
- Shaun Woodward (born 1958), politician, former Labour Secretary of State for Northern Ireland
- Graham Tomlin (born 1958), Bishop of Kensington
- Nick Sheppard (born 1960), guitarist
- Jeremy Northam (born 1961), actor
- Tim Hayward (born 1963), food writer, broadcaster and restaurateur
- John Lennard (born 1964), academic
- Rabinder Singh KC (born 1964), first Sikh High Court judge
- Janet Henry (born 1969), economist, currently Global Chief Economist at HSBC
- Richard Gould (born 1970), chief executive of Surrey County Cricket Club
- Neil Garrett (born 1975), journalist
- Michelle Goodman (born 1976), RAF Officer, first woman to receive the Distinguished Flying Cross
- Shrien Dewani (born 1979), arrested on suspicion of conspiring to murder
- Simon Case (born 1978), civil servant
- Sean Marsden (born 1980), professional rugby player
- Mark Watson (born 1980), comedian
- Alexander Betts (born 1980), academic
- Chris Skidmore (born 1981), Conservative MP
- James Kenber (born 1986), fencer
- Michael Coady (born 1987), professional rugby league player
- Tuppence Middleton (born 1987), actress
- Marcus Hamblett (born 1987), musician
- William Tavaré (born 1990), professional cricketer
- Emily Diamond (born 1991), track and field athlete
- Jordan Waller (born 1992), actor
- Katie Swan (born 1999), professional tennis player
