= John Moore Caldicott =

British-Rhodesian politician (1900–1986)

The Honourable Sir John Moore Caldicott KBE CMG

Federal Minister of Finance
- In office 3 September 1962 – 31 December 1963
- Prime Minister: Sir Roy Welensky
- Preceded by: Donald MacIntyre
- Succeeded by: Federation dissolved

Federal Minister of Defence
- In office 12 June 1959 – 7 May 1962
- Prime Minister: Sir Roy Welensky
- Preceded by: Sir Roy Welensky
- Succeeded by: Sir Malcolm Barrow

Federal Minister of Agriculture Minister of Health
- In office 18 December 1953 – 11 December 1958
- Prime Minister: Sir Godfrey Huggins; Sir Roy Welensky
- Succeeded by: John Cranmer Graylin (Agriculture); Benjamin Disraeli Goldberg (Health)

Minister of Agriculture and Lands
- In office 8 March 1951 – 5 February 1954
- Prime Minister: Sir Godfrey Huggins; Garfield Todd
- Preceded by: Patrick Bissett Fletcher
- Succeeded by: Patrick Bissett Fletcher

Member of the Southern Rhodesian Legislative Assembly for Mazoe
- In office 15 September 1948 – 27 January 1954
- Preceded by: Edward Noaks
- Succeeded by: Herbert Jack Quinton

Member of the Rhodesia and Nyasaland Federal Assembly for Darwin
- In office 15 December 1953 – 31 December 1963
- Preceded by: New seat
- Succeeded by: Federation dissolved

Personal details
- Born: 12 February 1900 Moreton-in-Marsh, Gloucestershire, England
- Died: 31 January 1986 (aged 85) Parirenyatwa Hospital, Harare, Zimbabwe
- Resting place: Warren Hills Cemetery
- Party: United Party
- Other political affiliations: Federal Party
- Spouse: Evelyn McArthur
- Relations: John William Caldicott (grandfather)

Military service
- Allegiance: United Kingdom
- Branch/service: Royal Air Force
- Years of service: 1918–1919
- Rank: Second lieutenant

Sir John Moore Caldicott KBE CMG (12 February 1900 – 31 January 1986) was a Rhodesian government minister.

== Early life ==
John Moore Caldicott was born in Moreton-in-Marsh, Gloucestershire, on 12 February 1900 the son of solicitor John Croydon Moore Caldicott and Lilian Caldicott. His paternal grandfather was John William Caldicott, the Rector and Dean of Shipston-on-Stour and the headmaster of Bristol Grammar School. Caldicott was education first at Malvern Preparatory School in Worcestershire and then at Shrewsbury School. After coming of age, Caldicott enlisted as a Private (Cadet) in the Royal Air Force on 22 April 1918 and undertook his training during the final months of the war, before being placed on the reserve on 11 March 1919. He was granted an honorary commission as a 2nd Lieutenant on 4 February 1919.

== Emigration to Africa ==
Following the end of his war service, on 4 March 1921 Caldicott, at the age of 21, sailed from London aboard the British India steamship SS Nevasa for Mombasa, Kenya Colony. However, by 1925 he had returned to England, and on 2 October 1925 departed Southampton aboard the Union-Castle steamship RMS Briton for Cape Town, to settle as a tobacco farmer in the Umvukwes District of Southern Rhodesia. In 1943–1945 Caldicott served as the President of the Rhodesia Tobacco Association. In 1945 he married Evelyn Macarthur, who had two existing children, and they had a son together, Michael John Caldicott. In 1946 he was elected President of the Rhodesian National Farmers' Union until 1948, which gave him a prominent platform for elected office.

== Southern Rhodesia Legislative Assembly ==
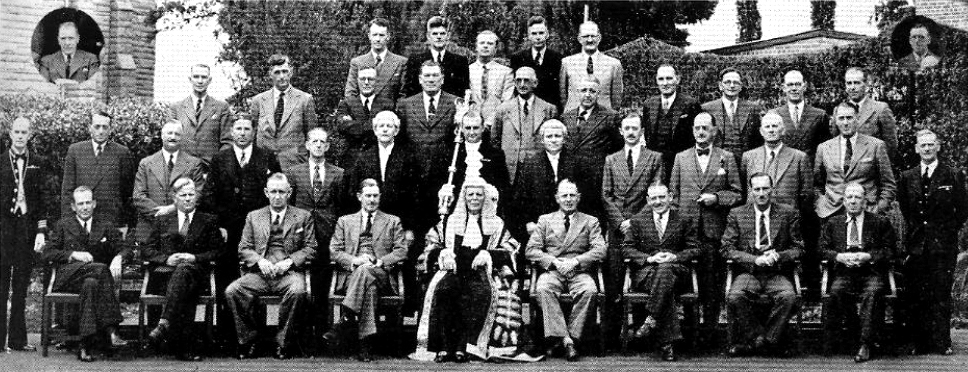
Southern Rhodesian Legislative Assembly, 1948. Caldicott is second from the right, second row.

Caldicott stood as a candidate for Sir Godfrey Huggins' United Party at the general election of 1948 for the Legislative Assembly of Southern Rhodesia and was subsequently elected MP for Mazoe.

== Federation Assembly and minister ==
In the first election of the Federation of Rhodesia and Nyasaland, Caldicott took 69% of the vote to win the seat of Darwin for the Federal Party.

With the end of the Federation in 1963, Caldicott retired from politics and returned to farming until 1970 when he took up residence in the Salisbury suburb of Greendale. In 1980, upon independence he opted to remain in the country and took up Zimbabwean citizenship. On 31 January 1986 at the age of 86 he died at the Parirenyatwa Hospital and was buried at Warren Hills Cemetery.

== Honours ==
Caldicott was made Companion of the Order of St Michael and St George (CMG) in the 1955 Birthday Honours and appointed Knight Commander of the Order of the British Empire (KBE) in the 1964 New Year Honours. In 1953, as a member of parliament he received the Queen Elizabeth II Coronation Medal. He was also granted retention of the title "The Honourable" on 31 December 1963, for having served for more than three years as a Minister of the Federal Government of the Federation of Rhodesia and Nyasaland.

Southern Rhodesian Legislative Assembly
Preceded by Edward Noaks	Member of Parliament for Mazoe; 1948 – 1954	Succeeded by Herbert Jack Quinton
Political offices
Preceded by Patrick Bissett Fletcher	Minister of Agriculture and Lands; 1951 – 1954	Succeeded by Patrick Bissett Fletcher
Rhodesia and Nyasaland Federal Assembly
New constituency	Member of Federal Parliament for Darwin; 1953 – 1963	Federation dissolved
Political offices
New title	Minister of Agriculture; 1953 – 1958	Succeeded by John Cranmer Graylin
New title	Minister of Health; 1953 – 1958	Succeeded by Benjamin Disraeli Goldberg
New title	Minister of Public Service; 1956 – 1962	Succeeded by John Duncan
New title	Minister of Economic Affairs; 1958 – 1962	Succeeded by Sir Malcolm Barrow
Preceded by Sir Roy Welensky	Minister of Defence; 1959 – 1962	Succeeded by Sir Malcolm Barrow
Preceded by Donald Macintyre	Minister of Finance; 1962 – 1963	Federation dissolved
