= Government of the Federation of Rhodesia and Nyasaland =

The Government of the Federation of Rhodesia and Nyasaland was established in 1953 and ran the Federation until its dissolution at the end of 1963. The members of the government were accountable to, and drawn from, the unicameral Federal Parliament.

== Initial Government 1953 ==
Office	Minister	Date appointed
Prime Minister	Godfrey Martin Huggins	7 September 1953
Minister of External Affairs and Defence	Godfrey Martin Huggins	7 September 1953
Minister of Finance	Godfrey Martin Huggins	7 September 1953
Minister of Transport and Development	Roy Welensky	7 September 1953
Minister of Internal Affairs	Malcolm Palliser Barrow	7 September 1953

== Huggins Government ==
Office	Minister	Date appointed
Prime Minister	Godfrey Martin Huggins	18 December 1953 – 2 November 1956
Minister of External Affairs	Godfrey Martin Huggins	18 December 1953 – 2 November 1956
Minister of Defence	Godfrey Martin Huggins	18 December 1953 – 2 November 1956
Minister of Transport	Roy Welensky	18 December 1953 – 12 February 1954
Minister of Communications	Roy Welensky	18 December 1953 – 12 February 1954
Minister of Transport and Communications	Roy Welensky	12 February 1954
Minister of Posts	Roy Welensky	12 February 1954
Minister of Finance	Donald MacIntyre	18 December 1953
Minister of Agriculture	John Moore Caldicott	18 December 1953
Minister of Health	John Moore Caldicott	18 December 1953
Minister of Internal Affairs	Malcolm Palliser Barrow	18 December 1953 – 12 February 1954
Minister of Home Affairs	Malcolm Palliser Barrow	12 February 1954 – 7 June 1955
Minister of Home Affairs	Frank Stephen Owen	7 June 1955
Minister of Commerce and Industry	Malcolm Palliser Barrow	12 February 1954
Minister of Power	Malcolm Palliser Barrow	7 April 1955
Minister of Education	Julian MacDonald Greenfield	12 February 1954

== Welensky government ==
Office	Minister	Date appointed
Prime Minister	Sir Roy Welensky	2 November 1956 – 31 December 1963
Minister of External Affairs	Sir Roy Welensky	2 November 1956 – 31 December 1963
Minister of Defence	Sir Roy Welensky	2 November 1956 – 12 June 1959
Minister of Defence	John Moore Caldicott	12 June 1959 – 7 May 1962
Minister of Defence	Sir Malcolm Palliser Barrow	7 May 1962 – 31 December 1963
Deputy Prime Minister	Sir Malcolm Palliser Barrow	7 May 1962 – 31 December 1963
Minister of Home Affairs	Sir Malcolm Palliser Barrow	2 November 1956 – 7 May 1962
Minister of Home Affairs	Julian Greenfield	7 May 1962 – 31 December 1963
Minister of Power	Sir Malcolm Palliser Barrow	2 November 1956 – 31 December 1963
Minister of Finance	Donald MacIntyre	2 November 1956 – 3 September 1962
Minister of Finance	John Moore Caldicott	3 September 1962 – 31 December 1963
Minister of Posts	Donald MacIntyre	2 November 1956 – 11 December 1958
Minister of Posts	Frank Stephen Owen	11 December 1958 – 31 December 1963
Minister of Public Service	John Moore Caldicott	2 November 1956 – 3 September 1962
Minister of Public Service	John Philip Gold Duncan	3 September 1962 – 31 December 1963
Minister of Agriculture	John Moore Caldicott	2 November 1956 – 11 December 1958
Minister of Agriculture	John Cranmer Graylin	11 December 1958 – 1 September 1963
Minister of Agriculture	James Arthur Clark	1 September 1963 – 31 December 1963
Minister of Health	John Moore Caldicott	2 November 1956 – 11 December 1958
Minister of Health	Benjamin Disraeli Goldberg	11 December 1958 – 31 December 1963
Minister of Economic Affairs	John Moore Caldicott	11 December 1958 – 7 May 1962
Minister of Economic Affairs	Sir Malcolm Palliser Barrow	7 May 1962 – 31 December 1963
Minister of Law	Julian MacDonald Greenfield	2 November 1956 – 31 December 1963
Minister of Education	Julian MacDonald Greenfield	2 November 1956 – 11 December 1958
Minister of Education	Benjamin Disraeli Goldberg	11 December 1958 – 7 May 1962
Minister of Education	John Philip Gold Duncan	7 May 1962 – 31 December 1963
Minister of Commerce and Industry	Frank Stephen Owen	2 November 1956 – 7 May 1962
Minister of Commerce and Industry	James Arthur Clark	7 May 1962 – 31 December 1963
Minister of Transport and Works	William Hives Eastwood	2 November 1956 – 11 December 1958
Minister of Transport	William Hives Eastwood	11 December 1958 – 7 May 1962
Minister of Transport	Frank Stephen Owen	7 May 1962 – 31 December 1963
Minister of Works	George Wellington Rex L'Ange	11 December 1958 – 31 December 1963

=== Parliamentary Secretaries ===
Office	Minister	Date appointed
PS to the Minister of Home Affairs	Benjamin Disraeli Goldberg	23 November 1956 – 11 December 1958
PS to the Minister of Home Affairs	John Foot	11 December 1958 – 31 December 1963
PS to the Minister of Home Affairs (Race Relations)	Jasper Zengeza Savanhu	3 April 1959 – 14 August 1962
PS to the Minister of Transport and Works	George Wellington Rex L'Ange	23 November 1956 – 11 December 1958
PS to the Minister of External Affairs	Godwin Akabiwa Mbikusita Lewanika	7 May 1962 – 31 December 1963
PS to the Minister of Defence, Economic Affairs and Power	Sydney Stanford Sawyer	7 May 1962 – 31 December 1963
