= Samuel Daniel Broughton =

English army surgeon

Samuel Daniel Broughton (1787–1837) was an English army surgeon.

== Life ==
Broughton was born in Bristol in July 1787, the son of the Rev. Thomas Broughton, who became rector of St. Peter's, Bristol, in 1781. He was educated at the Grammar school, under Samuel Seyer, author of Memorials of Bristol.

After studying at St George's Hospital he became assistant-surgeon of the Dorset militia, and in October 1812 was appointed assistant-surgeon of the 2nd Life Guards, of which . J. Carrick Moore, elder brother of the late General Sir John Moore, was then surgeon. Immediately afterwards Broughton was appointed additional surgeon with temporary rank, and placed in medical charge of the service squadrons of the regiment ordered abroad, with which he was present in the Iberian Peninsula and south of France to the end of the war. He was also with his regiment at the battle of Waterloo.

In July 1821 he succeeded to the surgeoncy of the regiment on the resignation of Mr. Moore, who had just been granted a pension of £1,000 a year in recognition of the distinguished services of his late brother. Residing in London with his regiment, Broughton devoted himself to professional and scientific studies.

He was elected a Fellow of the Royal Society (in 1830) and of the Geological Society.

In 1836 an injury to his leg, caused by a fall, resulted in disease of the ankle-joint which eventually rendered amputation necessary. The operation was performed by the eminent surgeon Liston, but he died ten days later at Regent's Park barracks on 20 August 1837. He was interred at Kensal Green cemetery.

== Writings ==
He documented his campaigning experiences from Lisbon to Boulogne in a volume of Letters from Portugal, Spain, and France in 1812, 1813, and 1814 (London, 1815). A list of original papers, chiefly relating to physiological research, contributed by him to various scientific journals, is in the Royal Society's Catalogue of Scientific Papers, 1800–63, vol. i. With Mr. Wilcox, barrister-at-law, he produced and delivered lectures on forensic medicine and toxicology.
