= Brightwell Manor =

Manor house in Oxfordshire, England

Coordinates: 51.6126°N 1.1666°W

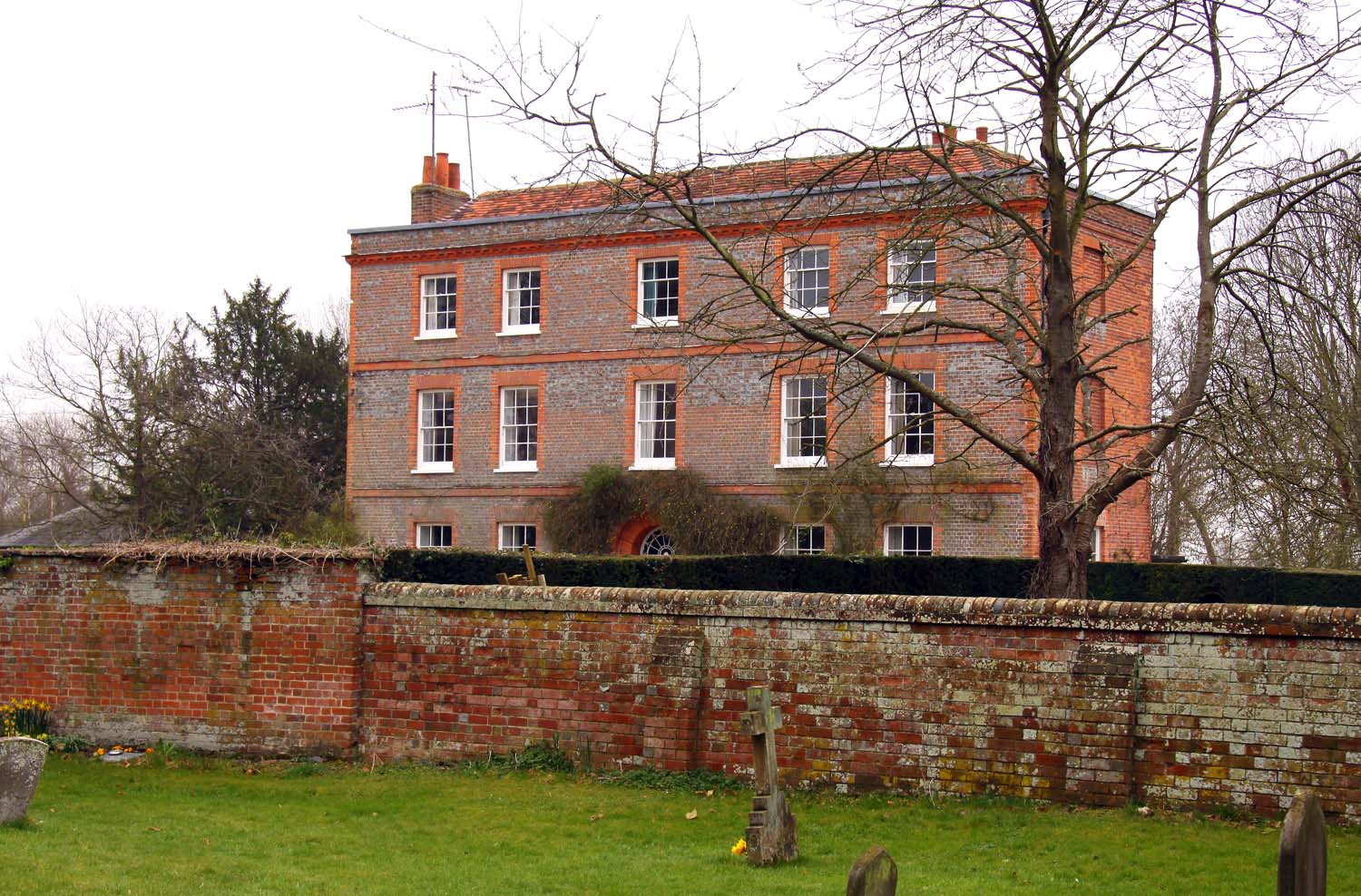
Brightwell Manor seen from St Agatha's churchyard in 2008

Brightwell Manor is a country house in the village of Brightwell-cum-Sotwell in Oxfordshire, England. It has been a Grade II listed building since 1952, and is owned by the former British prime minister Boris Johnson and his wife, Carrie Johnson.

The manor dates back to around the mid-seventeenth century, or possibly earlier as there is a date of 1605 on the rear. The front of the house was built in the mid-eighteenth century.

== History ==
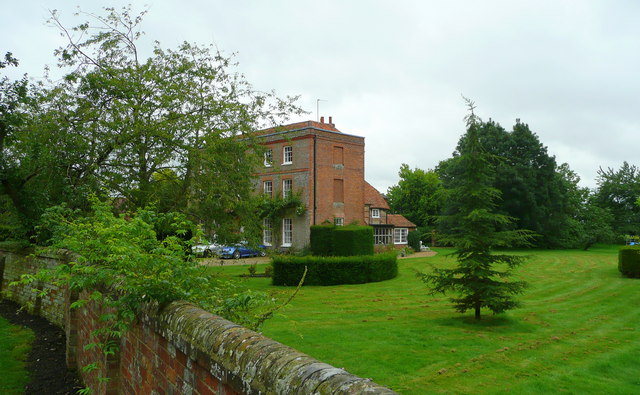
Brightwell Manor and grounds in 2008

In 1933, the house was purchased by William Ralph Inge, a theologian who was nominated on three occasions for the Nobel Prize in Literature. Inge served as Dean of St Paul's Cathedral for over twenty years from 1911 to 1934, becoming well known as the ’’Gloomy Dean’’ on account of his pessimistic views, which included supporting eugenics and opposing democracy. His wife wrote in her diary "It is a most attractive house but rather small." and that she had written to Paul Edward Paget and his business partner John Seely (later John Seely, 2nd Baron Mottistone) about adding to it. They wanted £2,000, and she wrote that "We really must try to cut them down a bit." Dean Inge died there in 1954 (and is buried next door in the churchyard), and the family owned the house until 1971, when his sons sold it. Johnson purchased it in February 2023 for a reported sum of £4 million.

In 1952, Brightwell Manor was Grade II listed by English Heritage. Most of the house probably dates back to the mid-17th century, and the front is mid-18th century. An extension was added by Inge in the 1950s. Pevsner Architectural Guides describes the house as a "plain late 18th century [sic] brick box", but notes the dating of 1605 on the earliest, rear portion of the house. (Note: Pevsner covers Brightwell-cum-Sotwell in the Berkshire volume of the Buildings of England series, since the area was only transferred to Oxfordshire at the division of the historic counties of England in the 1970s) Brightwell Manor has nine bedrooms and is 8,128 square feet (755 m^{2}) in total. The house sits in five acres (2.0 ha) of grounds, with a moat fed by a natural spring surrounding it on three sides. The study includes a mural painted by the neo-Romanticist George Warner Allen.
