= Benjamin Goldberg =

Benjamin Goldberg may refer to:

- Benjamin Disraeli Goldberg (1902–?), Irish-born Rhodesian lawyer and politician
- Benny Goldberg (1918–2001), Polish-born American bantamweight boxer
- Benjamin David Goldberg (born 1998), known professionally as Token (rapper), American rapper, singer, and record producer

== See also ==
- Ben Goldberg (born 1959), American clarinet player and composer
- Ben Zion Goldberg, pen name of Benjamin Waife (1895–1972), Belarusian-born Jewish-American journalist
