= Bernard Reardon =

British philosopher and priest

Bernard Morris Garvin Reardon (April 9, 1913 – February 28, 2006) was a British priest, philosopher, educator, and historian of modern church, especially 19th-century theology.

== Life ==
Reardon taught at the Newcastle University from 1963 until his retirement as Head of the Department of Religious Studies in 1978.

== Works ==
- Reardon, Bernard M. G. (1995). Religious Thought in the Reformation. Routledge. doi:10.4324/9781315842813. ISBN 978-1-317-89000-3.
- Reardon, Bernard M. G. (1988). Kant as Philosophical Theologian. doi:10.1007/978-1-349-08395-4. ISBN 978-1-349-08397-8.
- Reardon, Bernard M. G. (1977). Hegel's Philosophy of Religion. Macmillan. ISBN 978-0-333-18659-6.
- Reardon, Bernard M. G. (1975). Liberalism and Tradition: Aspects of Catholic Thought in Nineteenth-Century France. Cambridge University Press. ISBN 978-0-521-20776-8.
- Reardon, Bernard M. G. (1971). From Coleridge to Gore: a century of religious thought in Britain. Internet Archive. London : Longman. ISBN 978-0-582-48510-5.

=== Articles ===
- Reardon, Bernard M. G. (1984). "Schelling's Critique of Hegel". Religious Studies. 20 (4): 543–557. doi:10.1017/S0034412500016528. ISSN 0034-4125. JSTOR 20006100.
