= Janet Henry =

Janet Henry may refer to:

- Janet Henry (artist)
- Janet Henry (economist)
