= Cyril Norwood =

English educationalist

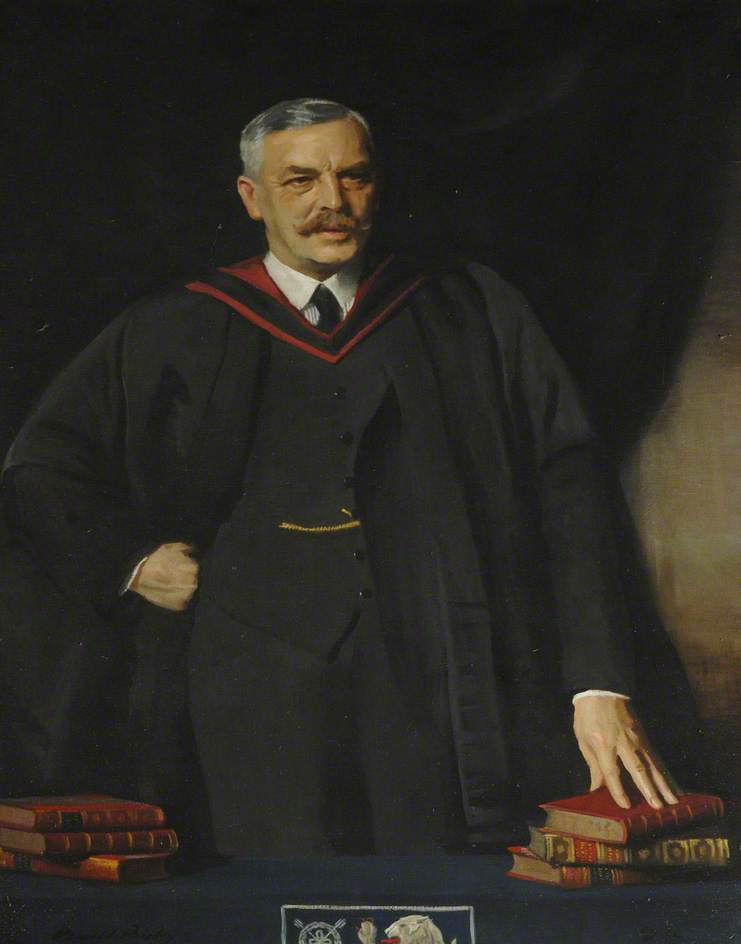
Sir Cyril Norwood in 1934, by Oswald Birley

Sir Cyril M. Norwood (15 September 1875 – 13 March 1956) was an English educationalist who served as Headmaster of Bristol Grammar School and Harrow School, Master of Marlborough College, and President of St John's College, Oxford.

== Biography ==
The son of the Reverend Samuel Norwood, of Whalley, Lancashire, Norwood was educated at the Merchant Taylors' School and St John's, Oxford. After passing the Home Civil Service examination, he joined the Admiralty in 1899, but left in 1901 to pursue a career in education.

He was a classics schoolmaster at Leeds Grammar School (1901–1906), before serving as Headmaster of Bristol Grammar School (1906–1916), Master of Marlborough College (1917–1925), Headmaster of Harrow (1926–1934) and President of St John's, Oxford, from 1934 to 1946.

=== Norwood Report ===
After being appointed to chair a committee for R. A. Butler, the President of the Board of Education, Norwood and committee wrote a 151-page document entitled Curriculum and Examinations in Secondary Schools: Report of the Committee of the Secondary School Examinations Council Appointed by the President of the Board of Education in 1941. In June 1943, they published the Norwood Report on secondary schooling: subsequently, some of its recommendations were adopted. In particular, the report led in time to the creation of three kinds of secondary schools: grammar schools; secondary technical schools; secondary moderns.

=== Other ===
During the Second World War, Norwood served on the Tribunal hearing the cases of men seeking to be accepted as conscientious objectors.

At this time, Norwood owned and lived at Trerose Manor in Cornwall.

His son-in-law was the Rev C. B. Canning, Headmaster of Canford.

After WW2, in 1946, Norwood was the President of the Geographical Association, following an earlier Marlborough colleague: Clement Cyril Carter (who had been president at the outbreak of the war) to the position.

As well as his role in education he also wrote an introduction for The British Encyclopaedia in 1933.

He retired to Iwerne Minster in Dorset where he died in 1956. He was married to Catherine Margaret Kilner in December 1901 and was knighted in 1938 for services to education.

A building is named after him as part of Bristol Grammar School's Elton Road Houses and is primarily used for the teaching of modern languages. The main dining hall at Marlborough College is named the Norwood Hall. Norwood wrote the lyrics, in Latin, for Bristol Grammar School's song, Carmen Bristoliense, which is still sung today.

Academic offices
Preceded by Robert Leighton	Head Master of Bristol Grammar School; 1906–1916	Succeeded by Joseph Edwin Barton
Preceded by St John Basil Wynne Willson	Master of Marlborough College; 1917–1925	Succeeded by George Charlewood Turner
Preceded by Lionel Ford	Head Master of Harrow School; 1926–1934	Succeeded by Paul Cairn Vellacott
Preceded by Frederick William Hall	President of St John's College, Oxford; 1933–1946	Succeeded by Austin Lane Poole
Non-profit organization positions
Preceded by Walter Matthews	President of the Modern Churchmen's Union; 1937–1958	Succeeded by Leonard Wilson
