= Michelle Goodman =

RAF officer

Flight Lieutenant Michelle Goodman DFC
- Born: Michelle Jayne Goodman; 22 November 1976 (age 49); Bristol, England
- Military career
- Allegiance: United Kingdom
- Branch: Royal Air Force
- Service years: 2000–2012
- Rank: Flight Lieutenant
- Conflicts: Iraq War
- Awards: Distinguished Flying Cross

Flight Lieutenant Michelle Jayne Goodman DFC (born 22 November 1976) is a retired Royal Air Force officer. She was the first woman to be awarded the Distinguished Flying Cross (DFC), for her actions while serving in Iraq, and the first female officer to be awarded any British combat gallantry medal.

== Early life ==
Goodman was born on 22 November 1976 in Bristol, England. She spent her early life there, attending Gracefield Preparatory School and Bristol Grammar School, a private day school in the city. She went on to study Aerospace Engineering at the University of Manchester. She graduated with upper second-class honours in her four-year degree.

== Military service ==
Goodman joined the RAF in 2000, and after initial officer training at Royal Air Force College Cranwell, she was appointed to a permanent commission as a pilot officer on 8 August 2000. She then trained as a helicopter pilot at RAF Shawbury in Shropshire. She was promoted to flying officer on 28 November 2000 (with seniority from 28 May 1998) and flight lieutenant on 28 November 2001. She joined 28 Squadron, part of the Merlin Force, at RAF Benson in 2004, transferring to 78 Squadron, also based at RAF Benson, when the Squadron was reformed in 2007. She completed three tours of Iraq.

She was captain of an Incident Reaction Team Merlin, when, on 1 June 2007, she flew into Basra at night using night vision and under heavy fire to evacuate a serious casualty, 20-year-old Rifleman Stephen Vause of the 4th Battalion The Rifles (who had been given 15 minutes to live following a mortar attack). Her DFC was gazetted on 7 March 2008, the first woman to receive this decoration. In December 2009, Goodman trained with the RAF in preparation for the joining Afghan War.

On 11 May 2012, she retired from the Royal Air Force.
