= Walter Matthews (priest) =

British Anglican priest and theologian (1881–1973)

The Very Reverend Walter Matthews CH KCVO
- Dean of St Paul's
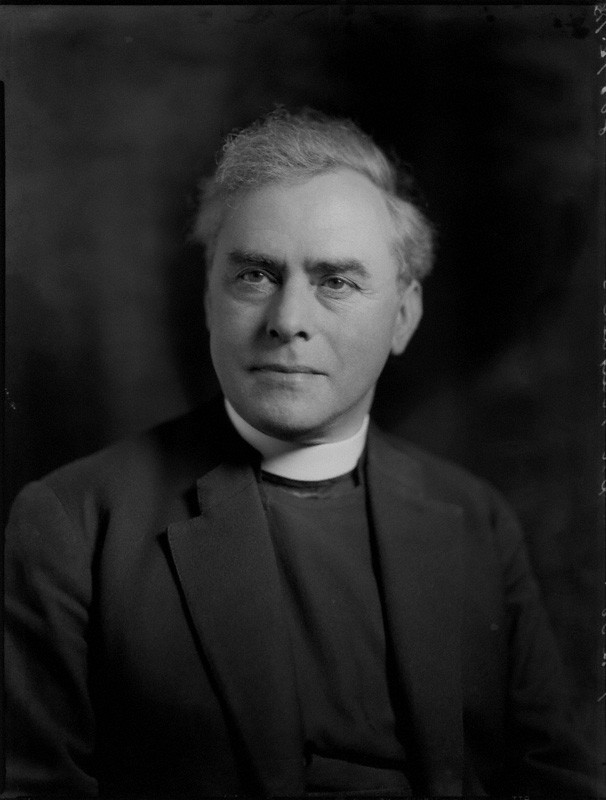
- Matthews in 1935
- Church: Church of England
- Diocese: London
- In office: 1934–1967
- Retired: 1967
- Predecessor: William Ralph Inge
- Successor: Martin Sullivan
- Other post: Dean of Exeter (1931–1934)

Orders
- Ordination: 1907

Personal details
- Born: Walter Robert Matthews; 22 September 1881 London, England
- Died: 4 December 1973 (aged 92)
- Denomination: Anglicanism
- Spouse: Margaret Bryan (m. 1911; died 1961)

Walter Robert Matthews CH KCVO (22 September 1881 – 4 December 1973) was an Anglican priest, theologian, and philosopher.

== Early life and education ==
Born on 22 September 1881 in Camberwell, London, to parents Philip Walter Matthews, a banker, and Sophia Alice Self, he was educated at Wilson's School and trained for the priesthood at King's College London.

== Ordained ministry ==
He was ordained deacon in 1907 and priest in 1908 and was a curate at St Mary Abbots' Kensington and St Peter's Regent Square. After that he was a lecturer in and then a professor of theology at King's College London. From 1918 he was also Dean of the college. In 1931 he became an Honorary Chaplain to the King and Dean of Exeter. Then in 1934 he became Dean of St Paul's, a post he held for 33 years. At the time of his appointment, he was president-elect of the Modern Churchmen's Union. He was described by his predecessor, William Ralph Inge, as something of an "Orthodox Modernist".

On 2 June 1940 the term "miracle of Dunkirk" was used for the first time by Matthews in a speech. He was praising the rescue of thousands of British soldiers and their allies from being encircled by the German Army in France.

He died on 4 December 1973.

== Published works ==
Matthews was an author. Among his works:

- Three Sermons on Human Nature and a Dissertation upon the Nature of Virtue. Editor. By Joseph Butler. London: G. Bell and Sons. 1914.
- King's College Lectures on Immortality. Editor. By J. F. Bethune-Baker; A. Caldecott; Hastings Rashdall; Wm. Brown; H. Maurice Relton. London: University of London Press. 1920.
- Studies in Christian Philosophy: Being the Boyle Lectures, 1920. London: Macmillan and Co. 1921.
- God and Evolution. London: Longmans, Green & Co. 1926.
- God in Christian Thought and Experience. 1930.
- The Purpose of God. London: Nisbet. 1935.
- Christ. New York: Macmillan Company. 1939.
- The Foundations of Peace. Eyre and Spottiswoode. 1942.
- The Problem of Christ in the Twentieth Century. 1950.
- Some Christian Words. John Allen and Unwin. 1956.
- Memories and Meanings. London: Hodder and Stoughton. 1969.
- The Year Through Christian Eyes. London: Epworth Press. 1970.

Church of England titles
Preceded by Henry Gamble	Dean of Exeter; 1931–1934	Succeeded by Spencer Carpenter
Preceded by William Ralph Inge	Dean of St Paul's; 1934–1967	Succeeded by Martin Sullivan
Academic offices
Preceded by Alfred Caldecott	Dean of King's College London; 1918–1931	Succeeded by Richard Hanson
Non-profit organization positions
Preceded by William Ralph Inge	President of the Modern Churchmen's Union; 1934 – c. 1937	Succeeded by Cyril Norwood
