= Brightwell Castle =

Castle in the United Kingdom

Coordinates: 51.61307°N 1.16665°W

Brightwell Castle was in the village of Brightwell-cum-Sotwell, between the towns of Didcot and Wallingford (grid reference SU578908), now in Oxfordshire but until 1974 in Berkshire, in England.

The castle was built in 1145 by King Stephen. At the time there was civil war known as The Anarchy between King Stephen and his cousin Empress Matilda, whose headquarters were at nearby Wallingford Castle. In 1153 the castle was destroyed by Matilda's son, who later became Henry II.

A manor house now stands on the site.
