= Brightwell-cum-Sotwell =

Villages and civil parish in Oxfordshire, England

Coordinates: 51°36′46″N 1°09′46″W

- Villages and civil parish
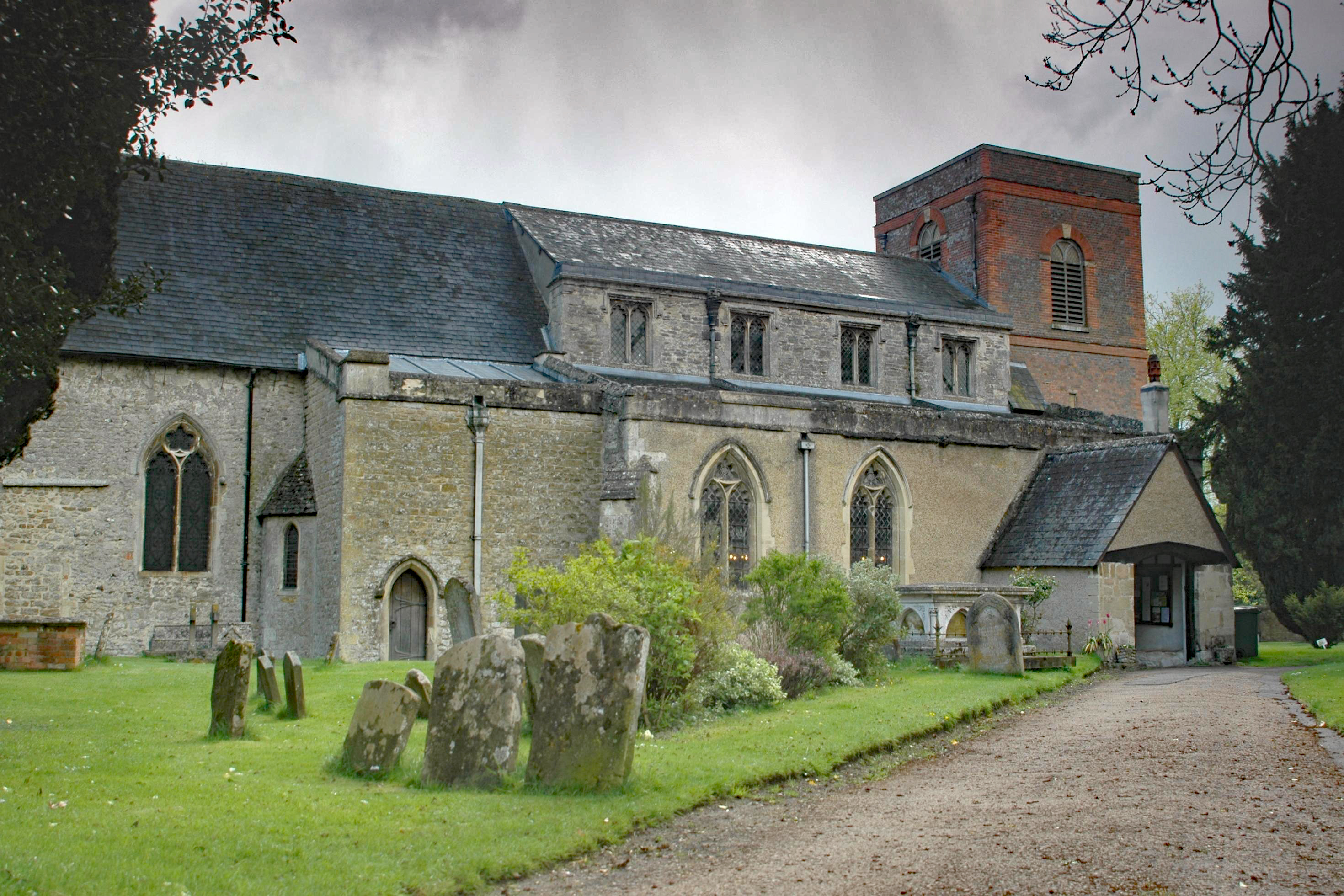
- St Agatha's parish church

- Location within Oxfordshire
- Area: 13.17 km^{2} (5.08 sq mi)
- Population: 1,538 (2011 census)
  - Density: 117/km^{2} (300/sq mi)
- OS grid reference: SU5890
- Civil parish: Brightwell-cum-Sotwell
- District: South Oxfordshire
- Shire county: Oxfordshire
- Region: South East
- Country: England
- Sovereign state: United Kingdom
- Post town: Wallingford
- Postcode district: OX10
- Dialling code: 01491
- Police: Thames Valley
- Fire: Oxfordshire
- Ambulance: South Central
- UK Parliament: Didcot and Wantage
- Website: Brightwell-cum-Sotwell Website

Brightwell-cum-Sotwell is a twin-village and civil parish in the Upper Thames Valley in South Oxfordshire. It lies between Didcot to the west and the historic market town of Wallingford to the east. In 1974 it was transferred from Berkshire to the county of Oxfordshire, and from Wallingford Rural District to the district of South Oxfordshire.

== History ==
Brightwell and Sotwell were originally two separate villages, rural settlements whose inhabitants worked the land.

=== Prehistory ===
For thousands of years, hunter-gatherers of the Thames Valley would have passed this way, stalking wild animals and gathering from the trees that grew on the greens and in this area. The good soil and the abundant water supply may have encouraged Iron Age farmers (1500 BC - AD 50) to settle in this area. The ramparts on Wittenham Clumps provide enduring evidence of Iron Age settlement in the area.

=== Roman ===
Evidence of a Roman road dating from about 43 CE, has been uncovered under the playing fields of the local primary school. Other finds include Roman coins and pottery.

=== Medieval times ===
The first written evidence of a village here comes from the various Saxon charters describing ownership of land in Beorhtanville, Suttanwille and Maccanie. In a charter of 854 Æthelwulf, King of Wessex granted Swithun, Bishop of Winchester, an estate of 30 hides at Brihtanwylle to help the bishop pay the expenses of entertaining distinguished foreign guests. Subsequently, William the Conqueror's agents recorded in the Domesday Book in 1086 70 families and two mills in Brightwell and Sotwell, but where the mills stood and how they were powered is unknown. Within 50 years of Domesday, Brightwell Castle was involved in the civil war between King Stephen and his cousin Matilda. The exact site of this castle is unknown, but it probably lay within the moated areas of what later contained St Agatha's/Brightwell manor house in Brightwell or Stonor Hayes manor house in Sotwell.

=== Early modern times ===
Brightwell Inclosure Act 1811
- Act of Parliament
- Parliament of the United Kingdom
- Long title: An Act for allotting and inclosing Lands in the Parish of Brightwell, in the County of Berks.
- Citation: 51 Geo. 3. c. lxxxiii

Dates
- Royal assent: 14 May 1811

Text of statute as originally enacted

For the next 800 years Brightwell and Sotwell parishes only occasionally appear in recorded history. For example:

- 1330 (circa) Thomas de Brayles, later Chancellor of the Irish Exchequer, appointed parish priest.
- 1500 (circa) Prince Arthur (eldest son of Henry VII) stayed at Sotwell House.
- 1507 Clerk in Holy Orders murdered in St Agatha's.
- 1649 Edward Hyde DD ejected from his living for being a Royalist.
- 1666 Church collection for victims of the Great Fire of London.
- 1726 Mrs Frances Riggins leaves a legacy "for bread and ye schooling for ye poor of Slade End".
- 1774-1849 Reverend Thomas Wintle. "About 4 o'clock with my neighbours at ye Red Lion where they dined at the expense of ye parish and myself and then set again to mark the boundaries"
- 1781 King George III rode through the village returning from a stag hunt.
- 1785 A Sunday school set up by the Reverend Wintle.
- 1811 Inclosure act for Brightwell, the Brightwell Inclosure Act 1811 (51 Geo. 3. c. lxxxiii), is passed.

With the coming of the Industrial Revolution and the Victorian era, the village had some significant philanthropists who worked hard for the good of the villagers:

- Reverend Marmaduke Thompson - building of Brightwell National School in the village.
- Reverend James Haldane Stewart - building of the new village school, which is now the village hall. Forming a night school for adult parishioners. Haldane House, in Bakers Lane, is named after this philanthropist.
- Farmer Edward Fairthorne - Reading Room and recreation ground for the villagers. Scholarships for promising boys to go to Wallingford Grammar School.
- Miss Augusta Fairthorne - endowment of the Free Church.

=== Modern times ===
The War Memorial records the loss of villagers in the armed services in the two world wars. In the middle of the twentieth century, there was significant expansion of the villages and in 1948 the villages of Brightwell and Sotwell were brought together as one civil parish. In 1949 the Greenmere estate was built and later, estates were also built at Kings Orchard, Monks Mead and Datchet Green. There are no immediate plans for any major development, though around 2011 there was some controversy regarding a plan to build some 800 houses between the village and Wallingford. The plan to develop on this area was eventually abandoned, in the face of local pressure, in favour of a new development on the Hithercroft.

== Notable buildings and structures ==
A walk around the narrow village streets will reveal many houses still standing which date back to Tudor times and beyond. The oldest building is probably Woodleys (Old Nursery Lane), with other examples such as Dobson's (Sotwell Street), The Old Priory (Little Lane), Middle Farm and Abbots House (both Church Lane - formerly Great Lane) and Smalls House (Mackney). Brightwell Manor is a Grade II listed building, with a mid seventeenth-century half-timbered structure extended by an eighteenth-century stone frontage.

The Church of England parish churches of St Agatha (Brightwell) and St James (Sotwell) would have been at the centre of village affairs, surrounded by many thatched cottages with cob, or wattle and daub, walls. The original building dates back to the twelfth century, the tower was rebuilt in about 1797. The church was restored in the nineteenth century, with an organ chamber added in about 1903.

== Notable residents ==
- Thomas de Brayles, judge and Crown official, was parish priest here in the 1330s.
- George Warner Allen, artist
- Dr Edward Bach, Mount Vernon centre for education and information. The home and workplace of Bach in the last years of his life, where he completed his research into the Bach flower remedies.
- Sir Francis Bernard, 1st Baronet, governor of the provinces of New Jersey and Massachusetts Bay, his uncompromising policies were instrumental in the events leading to the American Revolution.
- Charlie Brooker, British comedy writer, grew up in Brightwell-cum-Sotwell.
- Sir William Glock, Director of Music at the BBC and head of the Proms concerts, also lived in the village and died there in 2000.
- William Ralph Inge, a Dean of St Paul's Cathedral in London lived in Brightwell Manor. His family continued to reside there until the early 1970s.
- Boris Johnson, former Prime Minister, has lived in Brightwell Manor with his current family since 2023

== Gallery ==
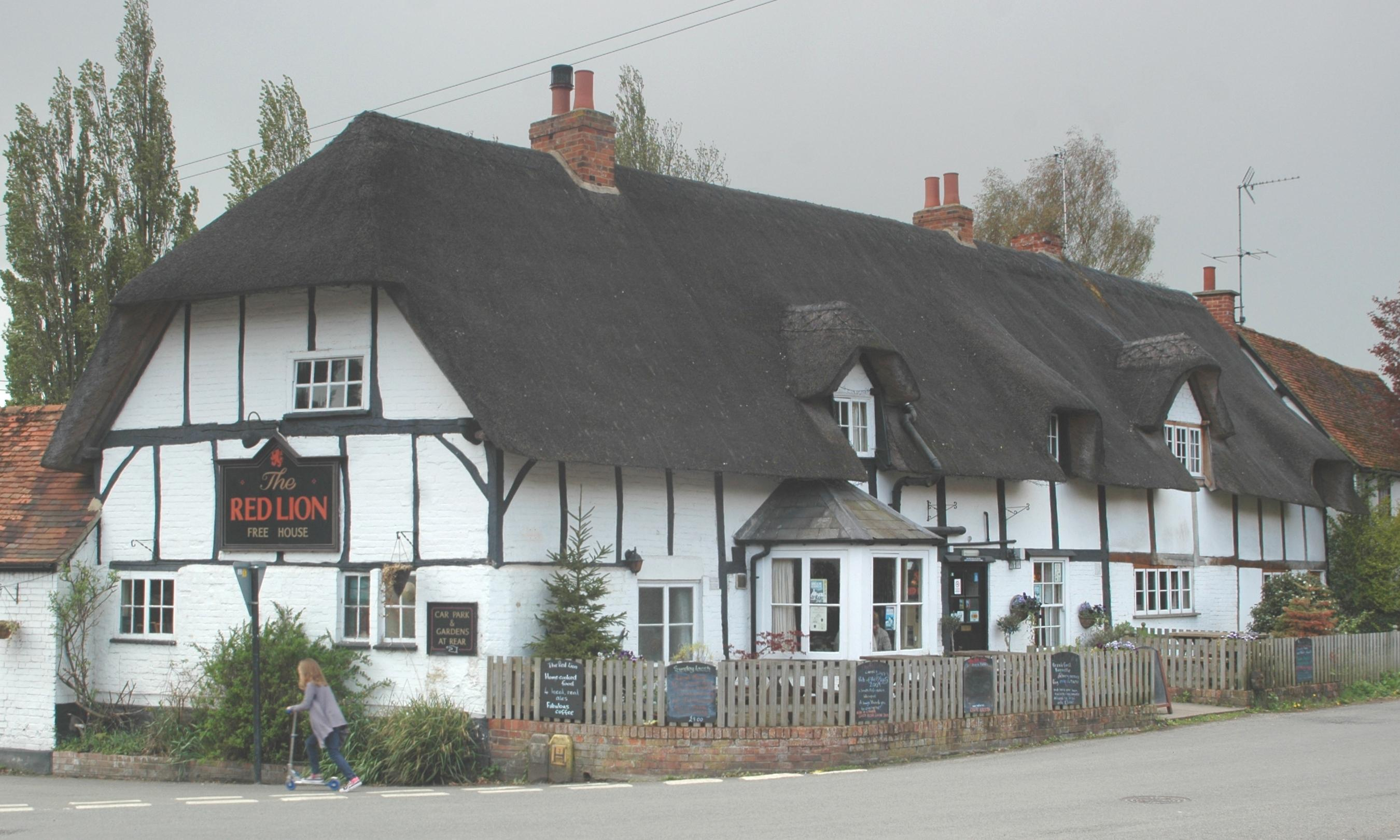
The Red Lion public house

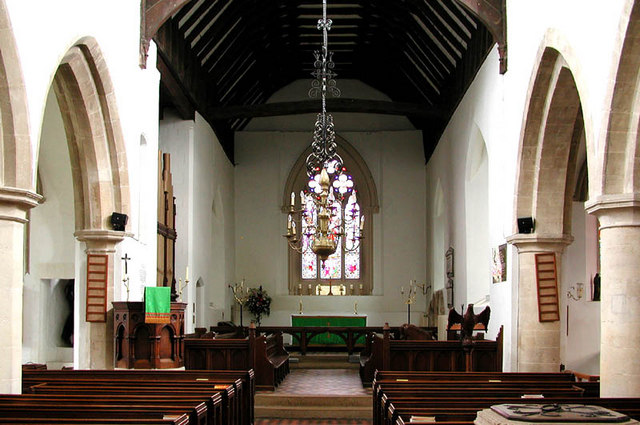
Inside St. Agatha's parish church

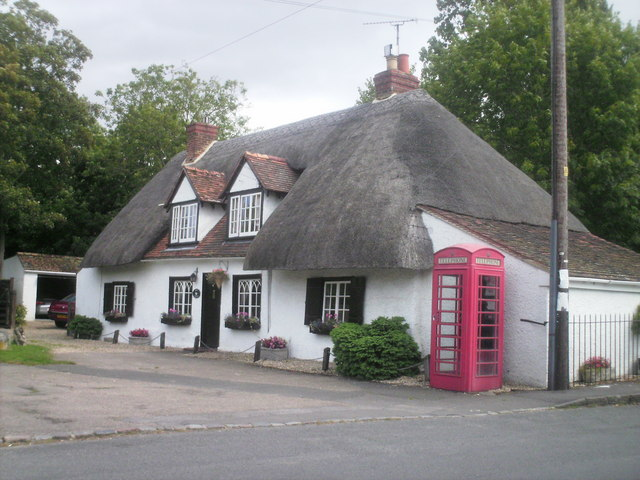
Moat Cottage and K6 telephone box

== Sources ==
- Page, W.H.; Ditchfield, P.H., eds. (1924). A History of the County of Berkshire, Volume 3. Victoria County History. pp. 464–471, 507–511.
- Pevsner, Nikolaus (1966). Berkshire. The Buildings of England. Harmondsworth: Penguin Books. pp. 102–103, 221–222.
