= Paul Badham =

British theologian (born 1942)

Paul Badham (born 26 September 1942) is professor emeritus of theology and religious studies at the University of Wales, Trinity Saint David. Educated at Reading School, Badham studied theology, religious studies and the philosophy of religion at Oxford (starting at Jesus College in 1962) and Cambridge universities, and received his PhD from the University of Birmingham. He trained for the Anglican Ministry at Westcott House and worked as a curate in Birmingham for five years before his appointment at Lampeter in 1973. He became a professor in 1991 and has served as head of department, head of school and dean of the Faculty of Theology. He was director of the Alister Hardy Religious Experience Research Centre from 2002 to 2010.

He is a vice president of Modern Church, a patron of Dignity in Dying, and a fellow of the Royal Society of Medicine. He was formerly editor of Modern Believing and a senior research fellow of the Ian Ramsey Centre for Science and Religion at Oxford University.

== Publications ==
- Making Sense of Death and Immortality (SPCK, 2013)
- A John Hick Reader (Wipf & Stock, 2011)
- Is there a Christian Case for Assisted Dying? (SPCK, 2009)
- The Contemporary Challenge of Modernist Theology (University of Wales Press, 1998)
- Facing Death (University of Chicago Press, 1996)
- Death and Immortality in the Religions of the World (with Linda Badham) (Paragon House, 1987)
- Immortality or Extinction? (with Linda Badham) (Macmillan, 1982)
- Christian Beliefs about Life after Death (Macmillan, 1976)
- A Defence of the Concept of the Soul (1976)
