= George Warner Allen =

British painter

- Born: 1916
- Died: 1988 (aged 71–72)
- Occupation: Painter
- Style: Neo-romanticism

George Warner Allen (1916–1988) was a British artist, considered to be of the Neo-Romantic school.

== Life ==
Allen was born in 1916. He was educated at Lancing College and then, on the recommendations of the artist Robert Anning Bell and art critic James Greig, at Byam Shaw School of Art, where he subsequently taught. He later lived and worked at Brightwell-cum-Sotwell, near Wallingford in Berkshire (now Oxfordshire).

Allen held a solo exhibition at the Walker's Galleries, London, in 1952, for which the catalogue's introductory essay was written by his fellow painter Brian Thomas. Pictures were purchased by T. S. Eliot, Sir John Betjeman, and The Earl Baldwin. The strain of the exhibition left him, after a while, unable to paint for eight years.

He converted to Roman Catholicism at Abingdon in 1973, after being asked to paint a tribute to Cardinal Newman. He died in 1988.

== Works ==
Allen worked in oils, tempera, and watercolour. Two of his works, Picnic at Wittenham (1947–1948) and The Return from Cythera (1985–1986) are in the Tate Gallery, London. His The Rubbish Dump (1955), showing Jesus over a backdrop of Black Country industrialisation, was commissioned by Canon David Wood, whose wife was Allen's cousin, as an altarpiece for the Black Country Industrial Mission at St. George's Vicarage in Wolverhampton. It was acquired in 2007 by Wolverhampton Art Gallery, purchased in part with a grant from The Art Fund. Other works are held by the Nuffield Foundation and in Swindon Art Gallery, British Museum, Reading Museum and Wallingford Museum.
