= William Ralph Inge =

English author, Anglican dean and professor of divinity (1860–1954)

The Very Reverend William Ralph Inge KCVO FBA
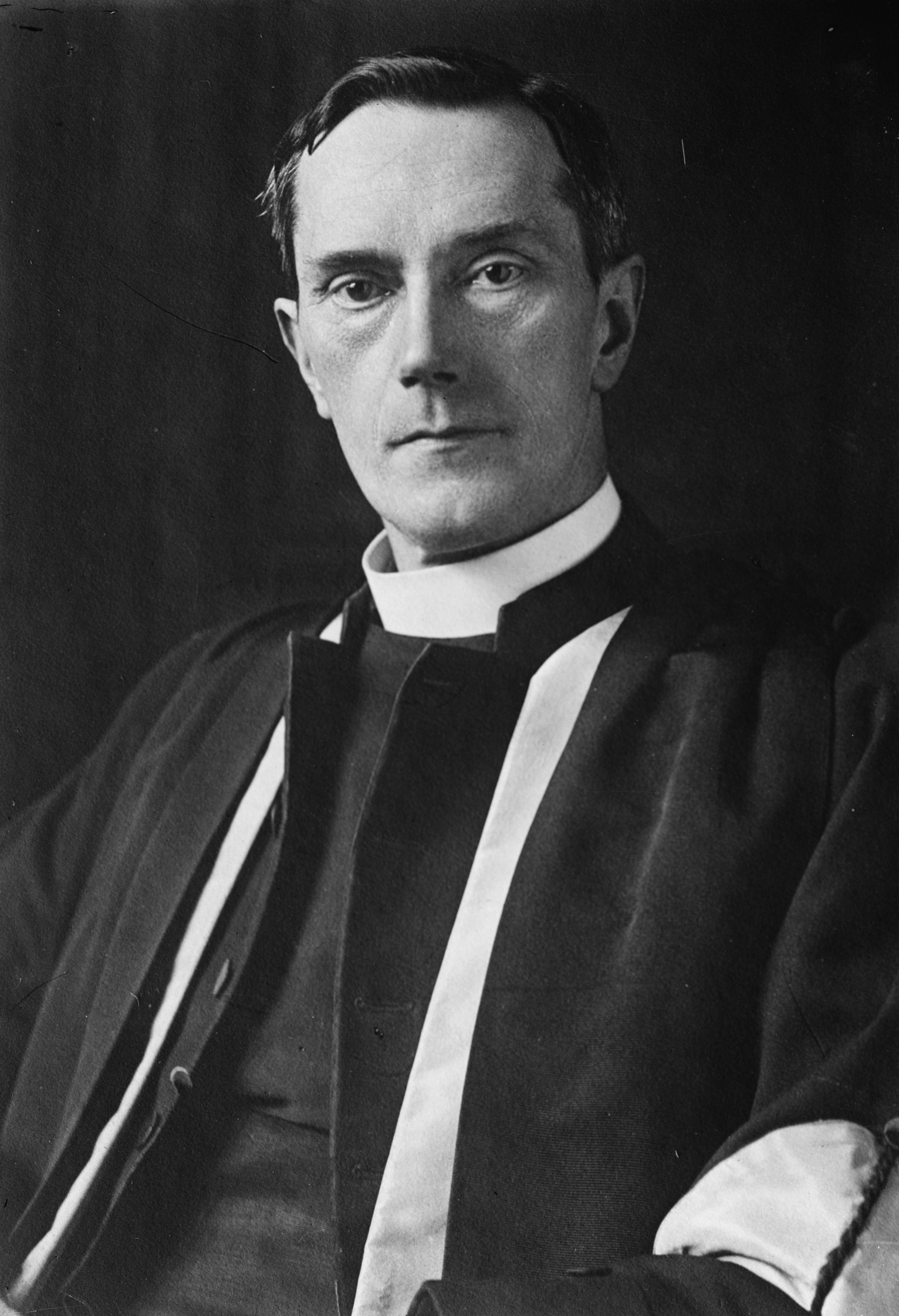
- Born: William Ralph Inge; 6 June 1860; Crayke, Yorkshire, England
- Died: 26 February 1954 (aged 93); Wallingford, Oxfordshire, England
- Education: King's College, Cambridge
- Spouse: Mary Catharine Inge (m. 1905; died 1949)
- Children: 5

Ecclesiastical career
- Church: Church of England
- Offices held: Vicar of All Saints, Knightsbridge (1905–1907); Lady Margaret's Professor of Divinity (1907–1911); Dean of St Paul's (1911–1934)

William Ralph Inge KCVO FBA (/ˈɪŋ/; 6 June 1860 – 26 February 1954) was an English author, Anglican priest, professor of divinity at Cambridge, and dean of St Paul's Cathedral. Although as an author he used W. R. Inge, and he was personally known as Ralph, he was widely known by his title as Dean Inge. He was nominated for the Nobel Prize in Literature three times.

== Early life and education ==
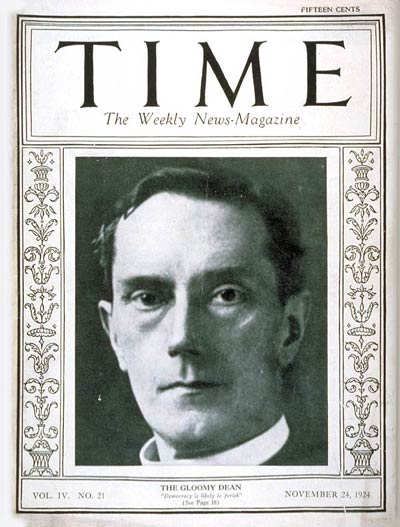
Time cover, 24 November 1924

He was born on 6 June 1860 in Crayke, Yorkshire, England. His father, Rev. William Inge was the local curate, and would later go on to become Provost of Worcester College, Oxford. His mother was Susanna Inge (née Churton), daughter of Edward Churton, rector of Crayke and the Archdeacon of Cleveland. Inge had a "staunchly high-church upbringing".

Inge was educated at Eton College, where he was a King's Scholar and won the Newcastle Scholarship in 1879. In 1879, he went on to King's College, Cambridge, where he won a number of prizes including the Chancellor's Medal, as well as taking firsts in both parts of the Classical Tripos.

== Career ==
=== Positions held ===
Inge was an assistant master at Eton from 1884 to 1888, and a Fellow of King's College from 1886 to 1888.

In the Church of England, he was ordained deacon in 1888, and priest in 1892.

He was a Fellow and Tutor at Hertford College, Oxford from 1889 to 1904.

His only parochial position was as vicar of All Saints, Knightsbridge, London, from 1905 to 1907.

In 1907, he moved to Jesus College, Cambridge, on being appointed Lady Margaret's Professor of Divinity.

In 1911, he became Dean of St Paul's Cathedral in London. He served as president of the Aristotelian Society at Cambridge from 1920 to 1921.

He retired from full-time church ministry in 1934.

Inge was also a trustee of London's National Portrait Gallery from 1921 until 1951.

=== Writing ===
Inge was a prolific author. In addition to scores of articles, lectures and sermons, he also wrote over 35 books. Inge was a columnist for the Evening Standard for many years, finishing in 1946.

He is best known for his works on Plotinus and neoplatonic philosophy, and on Christian mysticism, but also wrote on general topics of life and current politics.

He was nominated for the Nobel Prize in Literature three times.

=== Views ===
Inge was a strong proponent of the spiritual type of religion—"that autonomous faith which rests upon experience and individual inspiration"—as opposed to one of coercive authority. He was therefore outspoken in his criticisms of the Roman Catholic Church. His thought, on the whole, represents a blending of traditional Christian theology with elements of Platonic philosophy. He shares this in common with one of his favourite writers, Benjamin Whichcote, the first of the Cambridge Platonists.

The Idea of Progress. The Romanes Lecture 1920.

He was nicknamed 'The Gloomy Dean' because of his pessimistic views in his Romanes Lecture of 1920, "The Idea of Progress" and in his Evening Standard articles. In his Romanes Lecture he said that although mankind's accumulated experience and wonderful discoveries had great value, they did not constitute real progress in human nature itself.

He critiqued democracy's propensity to lead to mob rule and the tyranny of the majority, echoing Tocqueville and Burke, while remaining supportive of the parliamentary and representative system over against autocracy. His stance was typical of the elitist sensibilities expressed by other interwar liberals, conservatives, and progressives. In 1919, he anticipated Churchill's famous 1947 remark about democracy as "the worst form of Government except for all those other forms that have been tried from time to time," saying that "Democracy is a form of government which may be rationally defended, not as being good, but as being less bad than any other.” He saw the levelling tendency of democratism as in tension with the fact that "Human beings are born unequal" and opined that "the only persons who have a right to govern their neighbours are those who are competent to do so." He questioned the electoral prudence of the British Conservative Party in lowering the age of women's suffrage from 30 to 21 on the eve of its being granted, alongside the removal of property requirements for male as well as female voters, though once it had been granted he accepted it pragmatically.

Inge was a supporter of population control and a member of the British Eugenics Society from 1908 “until the Second World War, when he resigned in disgust.” These were themes he touched on in newspaper or journal articles collected in Outspoken Essays and subsequent publications.

Inge critiqued certain social welfare schemes that he believed "penalized the successful while subsidizing the weak and feckless".

Inge defended the dignity of British Jews against the anti-Dreyfusard Hilaire Belloc’s 1922 book The Jews. “It is contrary to all our traditions," he wrote, "to do what Mr. Belloc wishes us to do—to refuse to forget a man’s racial origins while he lives among us as a good Englishman […] we have enriched our stock by blending it with desirable foreigners of all sorts.” Against scapegoating of Jews, Inge reminded his readers that “It is not their fault that they have been excluded from agriculture and similar pursuits […] It was not by their own choice that they were impounded in Ghettos, or driven to money-lending.” In Inge’s view, “we ought to be ashamed of anti-Jewish prejudice” because “[a]bove all, race-consciousness is a rather silly thing. The sensible man takes his neighbours as he finds them, and is not too ready to believe in dark conspiracies.”

He was also known for his support for nudism. He supported the publishing of Maurice Parmelee's book, The New Gymnosophy: Nudity and the Modern Life, and was critical of town councillors who were insisting that bathers wear full bathing costumes.

=== Recognition ===
He was made a Commander of the Victorian Order (CVO) in 1918 and promoted to Knight Commander (KCVO) in 1930. He received Honorary Doctorates of Divinity from both Oxford and Aberdeen Universities, Honorary Doctorates of Literature from both Durham and Sheffield, and Honorary Doctorates of Laws from both Edinburgh and St Andrews. He was also an honorary fellow of both King's and Jesus Colleges at Cambridge, and of Hertford College at Oxford. In 1921, he was elected as a Fellow of the British Academy (FBA), the United Kingdom's national academy for the humanities and social sciences.

== Personal life ==
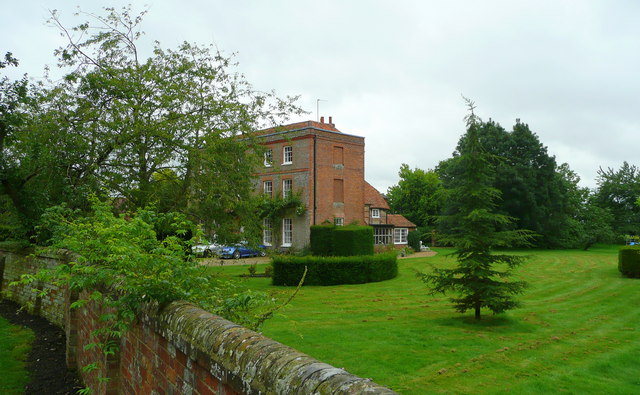
Brightwell Manor in 2008

On 3 May 1905, Inge married Mary Catharine "Kitty" Spooner, daughter of Henry Maxwell Spooner, the Archdeacon of Maidstone. They had five children:

- William Craufurd Inge (1906–2001)
- Edward Ralph Churton Inge (1907–1980)
- Catharine Mary Inge (1910–1997), married Derek Wigram
- Margaret Paula Inge (1911–1923), died from type 1 diabetes
- Richard Wycliffe Spooner Inge (1915–1941), priest, killed on an RAF training flight

Inge's wife died in 1949.

Inge spent his later life at Brightwell Manor in Brightwell-cum-Sotwell, Oxfordshire, where he died on 26 February 1954, aged 93, five years after his wife.

== Publications ==
The following bibliography is a selection taken mainly from Adam Fox's biography Dean Inge and his biographical sketch in Crockford's Clerical Directory.

- Society in Rome under the Caesars 1888
- Eton Latin Grammar 1888
- Christian Mysticism (Bampton Lectures) 1899
- Faith 1900
- Contentio Veritatis Essays in Constructive Theology by Six Oxford Tutors (two essays) 1902
- Faith and Knowledge: Sermons 1904
- Light, Life and Love (Selections from the German mystics of the Middle Ages) 1904 also online at Project Gutenberg and CCEL
- Studies of English Mystics 1905
- Truth and Falsehood in Religion (Cambridge Lectures 1906
- Personal Idealism and Mysticism (Paddock Lectures) 1906
- All Saints' Sermons 1907
- Faith and its Psychology (Jowett Lectures) 1909
- Speculum Animae 1911
- The Church and the Age 1912
- The Religious Philosophy of Plotinus and some Modern Philosophies of Religion 1914
- Types of Christian Saintliness 1915
- Christian Mysticism, considered in eight lectures delivered before the University of Oxford (1918)
- The Philosophy of Plotinus (Gifford Lectures) 1918. Online: Volume 1 Volume 2 Print versions: ISBN 1-59244-284-6 (softcover), ISBN 0-8371-0113-1 (hardcover)
- Outspoken Essays I 1919 & II 1922
- The Idea of Progress. Romanes Lecture. 1920.
- The Victorian Age: the Rede Lecture for 1922 1922
- Assessments and Anticipations 1922 (2nd ed. 1929)
- Personal Religion and the Life of Devotion 1924
- Lay Thoughts of a Dean 1926
- The Platonic Tradition in English Religious Thought Hulsean Lectures 1926 ISBN 0-8414-5055-2
- England 1926
- The Church in the World 1927
- Protestantism (London: Ernest Benn Limited, 1927)
- Christian Ethics and Modern Problems 1930
- More Lay Thoughts of a Dean. London and New York: Putnam. 1932.
- Things New and Old 1933
- God and the Astronomers 1933
- The Post Victorians 1933 (Introduction only)
- Vale 1934
- The Gate of Life 1935
- A Rustic Moralist 1937
- Our Present Discontents 1938 ISBN 0-8369-2846-6
- A Pacifist in Trouble 1939 ISBN 0-8369-2192-5
- The Fall of the Idols 1940
- Talks in a Free Country 1942 ISBN 0-8369-2774-5
- Mysticism in Religion 1947 ISBN 0-8371-8953-5
- The End of an Age and Other Essays 1948
- Diary of a Dean 1949
- The Things That Remain edited by W R Matthews 1958

Church of England titles
Preceded by Robert Gregory	Dean of St Paul's; 1911–1934	Succeeded by Walter Matthews
Academic offices
Preceded by Alexander Kirkpatrick	Lady Margaret's Professor of Divinity; 1907 – c. 1911	Succeeded by James Bethune-Baker
Non-profit organization positions
Preceded by James Ward	President of the Aristotelian Society; 1920–1921	Succeeded by F. C. S. Schiller
Preceded by Hastings Rashdall	President of the Modern Churchmen's Union; 1924–1934	Succeeded by Walter Matthews
Awards and achievements
Preceded by Frederick H. Gillett	Cover of Time magazine 24 November 1924	Succeeded by Chauncey Depew
