= International Catalogue of Scientific Literature =

The International Catalogue of Scientific Literature
- Discipline: Science
- Language: English, French, German, Italian

Publication details
- History: 1902–1921
- Publisher: Royal Society of London (Great Britain)
- Frequency: Annual

Standard abbreviations
- ISO 4: Int. Catalogue Sci. Lit.

Indexing
- LCCN: 2002252031
- OCLC no.: 32556927

The International Catalogue of Scientific Literature was an annual index covering scientific literature from all major areas of science. The Catalogue was produced by an international committee and was published by the Royal Society of London. It was published from 1902–1921, and indexed scientific literature published from 1901–1914.

== History ==
The International Catalogue of Scientific Literature developed from the earlier Catalogue of Scientific Papers dating from 1867.

According to Isadora Mudge in the Guide to Reference Books: "While issued this was the most important current bibliography covering all the sciences. Includes both books and periodical articles. Publication suspended after issues of the volumes for 1914". A reprint of the Catalogue was published in 1968 by the Johnson Reprint Corporation (New York).

As the Royal Society was unable to continue financially supporting the Catalogue, financial assistance was sought from the scientific offices of contributing countries. Despite these efforts, the Catalogue ceased publication in large part due to increasing international tension in the build up to World War I and to a lesser extent the resulting devaluation of currency.

== Criticism ==
As Mudge notes, the Catalogue "[i]ndexes a large number of important scientific journals, but was never very satisfactory for up-to-date reference work because of the delay in publication.

== Coverage ==
Each year, seventeen volumes were issued:

Subject
A: Mathematics
B: Mechanics
C: Physics
D: Chemistry
E: Astronomy
F: Meteorology
G: Mineralogy
H: Geology
J: Geography
K: Palæontology
L: General biology
M: Botany
N: Zoology
O: Human anatomy
P: Physical anthropology
Q: Physiology
R: Bacteriology
