= John Caldicott =

Anglican priest and headmaster

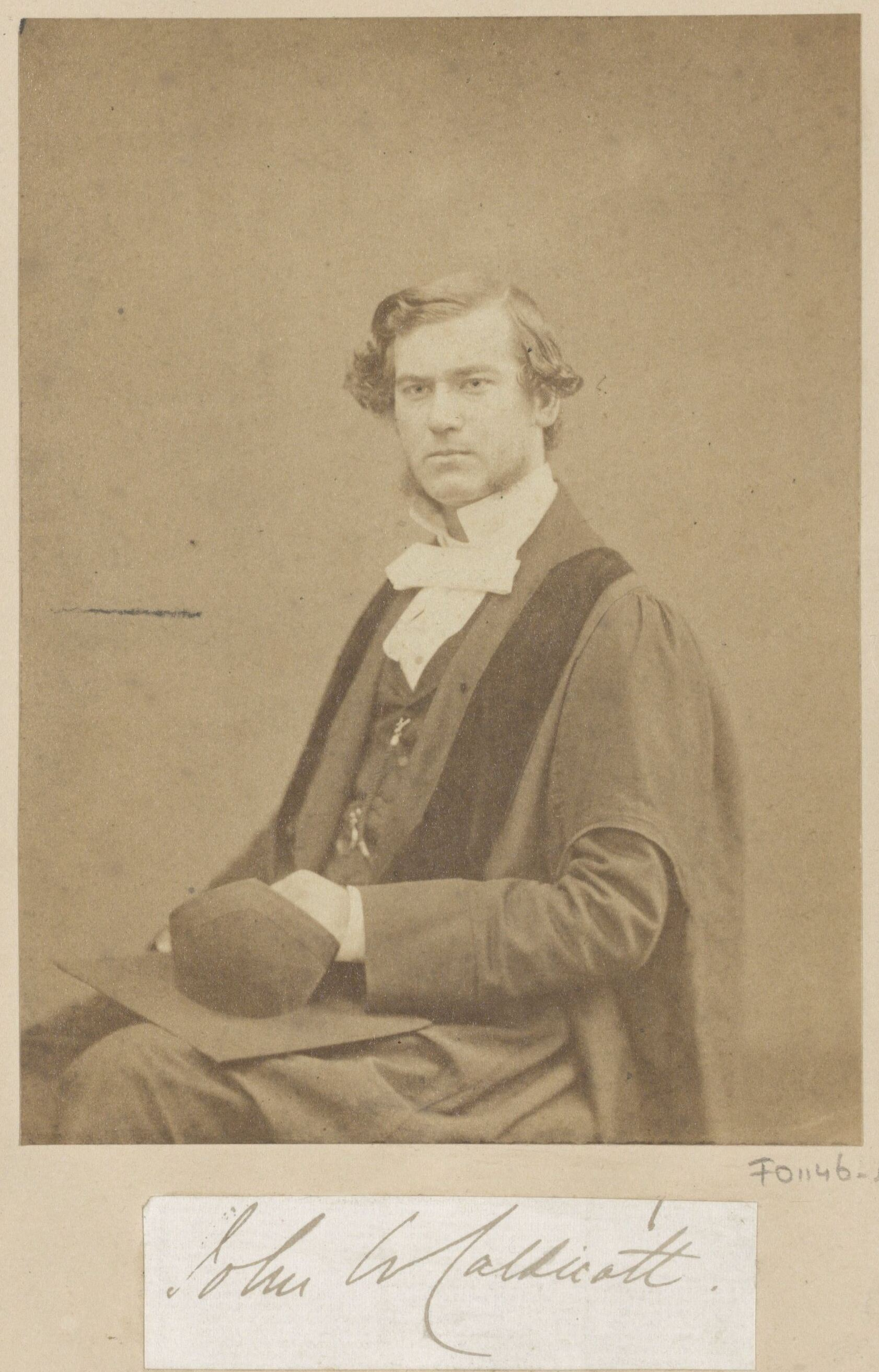
John W. Caldicott in Oxford, c. 1860

Rev. John William Caldicott (9 February 1829 – 6 November 1895) was an Anglican priest and headmaster.

== Early life and education ==
Caldicott was born in Edgbaston, Warwickshire, to John Caldicott, a hosier, and Anne Caldicott. He was educated at King Edward VI School, Birmingham before entering the University of Oxford, initially as a member of Pembroke College before transferring to Jesus College. He obtained a second-class degree in Literae Humaniores and a third-class degree in Mathematics in 1851. He was one of the examiners in classics in 1859 and 1860.

== Career ==
He was appointed headmaster of Bristol Grammar School in 1860, and was rector and rural dean of Shipston-on-Stour with Tidmington. He was also a magistrate for Warwickshire and Worcestershire, an alderman of Worcestershire County Council and a former chairman of the Liberal Association in Evesham. He was awarded his BD and DD degrees by Oxford University in 1874. By his wife, Hannah, Caldicott had two sons, John Croydon (b. 1866) and Arthur Henry (b. 1867); they both went up to Oxford University. He died on 6 November 1895 aged 66, having suffered a stroke a few days earlier.
