= Modern Church =

British charity for liberal Christian theology

Modern Church is a charitable society promoting liberal Christian theology. It defends liberal positions on a wide range of issues including gender, sexuality, interfaith relations, religion and science, and biblical scholarship. In church affairs it supports the role of laity and women ministers. Members receive the journal Modern Believing and the newsletter Signs of the Times. A substantial account of its theology is Paul Badham’s The Contemporary Challenge of Modernist Theology. From 2011-2013 it published a series of short books introducing some of its themes. It has a large website. There is a regular annual conference. The theological principles behind its liberalism are that

- divine revelation has not come to an end;
- new ideas should be judged on their merits and ideas accepted or rejected in the past can be reassessed.
- human rationality and creativity are not contrasted with divine revelation, but are valued as means to receiving it.

Understood like this, theological liberalism is opposed to dogmatism. Its style is open and enquiring, willing to dialogue with other traditions and accept new insights from unexpected sources. It values critical scholarship of the Bible and Christian history. It expects to contribute to, and learn from, contemporary society in ways that are public, relevant and respectful.

== History ==
The society was founded in 1898 as the Churchmen's Union for the Advancement of Liberal Religious Thought as a society to defend the tolerant 'middle ground' within the Church of England. At the time both Evangelicalism and Anglo-Catholicism were becoming increasingly dogmatic in reaction against secular rationalism, which seemed a threat to religious belief. After a few changes of name, the society was known as The Modern Churchmen’s Union from 1928 to 1986. The name was then changed to The Modern Churchpeople’s Union and changed again in 2010 to Modern Church.

From the outset it defended belief in evolution and critical scholarship of the Bible. It promoted the ordination of women from the 1920s. During the twentieth century it was among the first voices within the Church to campaign for contraception, remarriage after divorce, the abolition of capital punishment, the decriminalisation of homosexuality and the consecration of women bishops. As part of its work in support of gay and lesbian clergy it was heavily involved in resisting the proposed Anglican Covenant.

Its journal was founded in 1911. At first known as The Modern Churchman, it is now Modern Believing and is published by Liverpool University Press.

Annual conferences began in 1914 and have continued with the exception of the war years. Over the years many distinguished theologians have addressed them. Its most controversial conference was 'Christ and the Creeds' in 1921. It generated so much debate that the Church of England set up a Doctrine Commission to investigate it. The Commission produced a report in 1938 exonerating the views expressed.

The dominant figure in the early years was Henry Major. Major not only ran the organisation but also set up a theological college for it in Ripon. The college moved to Oxford as Ripon Hall, and in 1975 merged with Cuddesdon as Ripon College Cuddesdon.

The most detailed history of the organisation is Alan Stephenson's The Rise and Decline of English Modernism. It was written in the early 1980s at a time when the society was in decline and Stephenson expected it to die out, but since then it has revived.

Apart from Henry Major, leading theologians in the past are Hastings Rashdall, W. R. Inge (known as 'Dean Inge'), Charles Raven, Norman Pittenger, William Frend and Anthony Dyson. Theologians among its current members include Linda Woodhead, Martyn Percy, Paul Badham, Elaine Graham, John Barton, Alan Race and Adrian Thatcher.

== Leadership ==
In July 2017, Modern Church announced that its next General Secretary would be Jonathan Draper. He took up the part-time post on 1 September 2017.

List of presidents:

- 1898–1902: The Revd Prof George Henslow
- 1902–1908: The Revd William Douglas Morrison
- 1908–1915: Sir Charles Acland
- 1915–1922: Prof Percy Gardner
- 1923–1924: The Very Revd Hastings Rashdall
- 1924–1934: The Very Revd William Ralph Inge
- 1934–1937: The Very Revd Walter Matthews
- 1937–1958: Sir Cyril Norwood
- 1958–1966: The Rt Revd Leonard Wilson
- 1966–1990: The Very Revd Edward Carpenter
- 1990–1997: The Rt Revd Peter Selby
- 1997–2011: The Rt Revd John Saxbee
- 2011–2013: The Revd Prof John Barton
- 2014–2019: Prof Linda Woodhead
- 2019–present: Prof Elaine Graham

List of secretaries:

- 1899–1900: The Revd William Geikie-Cobb
- 1900–????: The Revd William Manning
- 1916–1920: The Revd Cavendish Moxon
- 1920–1923: Philip Henry Bagenal
- 1923–1927: The Revd John Henry Bentley
- 1927–1942: The Revd Thomas John Wood
- 1942–1950: The Revd Robert Gladstone Griffith
- 1950–1954: The Revd Thomas John Wood
- 1954–1960: The Revd Clifford Oswald Rhodes
- 1960–1990: uncertain
- 1991–2002: The Revd Nicholas Paul Henderson
- 2002–2013: The Revd Jonathan Clatworthy
- 2013–2016: The Revd Guy Elsmore
- 2016 (acting): The Revd Lorraine Cavanagh
- 2017–present: The Very Revd Jonathan Draper
