= Timothy Holroyde =

English judge

The Right Honourable Sir Timothy Holroyde
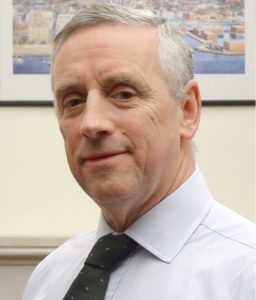

Lord Justice of Appeal
- In office October 2017 – October 2025
- Monarchs: Elizabeth II; Charles III
- Vice President: Court of Appeal (Criminal Division)

High Court Judge Queen's Bench Division
- In office January 2009 – October 2017

Personal details
- Born: Timothy Victor Holroyde; 18 August 1955 (age 71)
- Education: Wadham College, Oxford
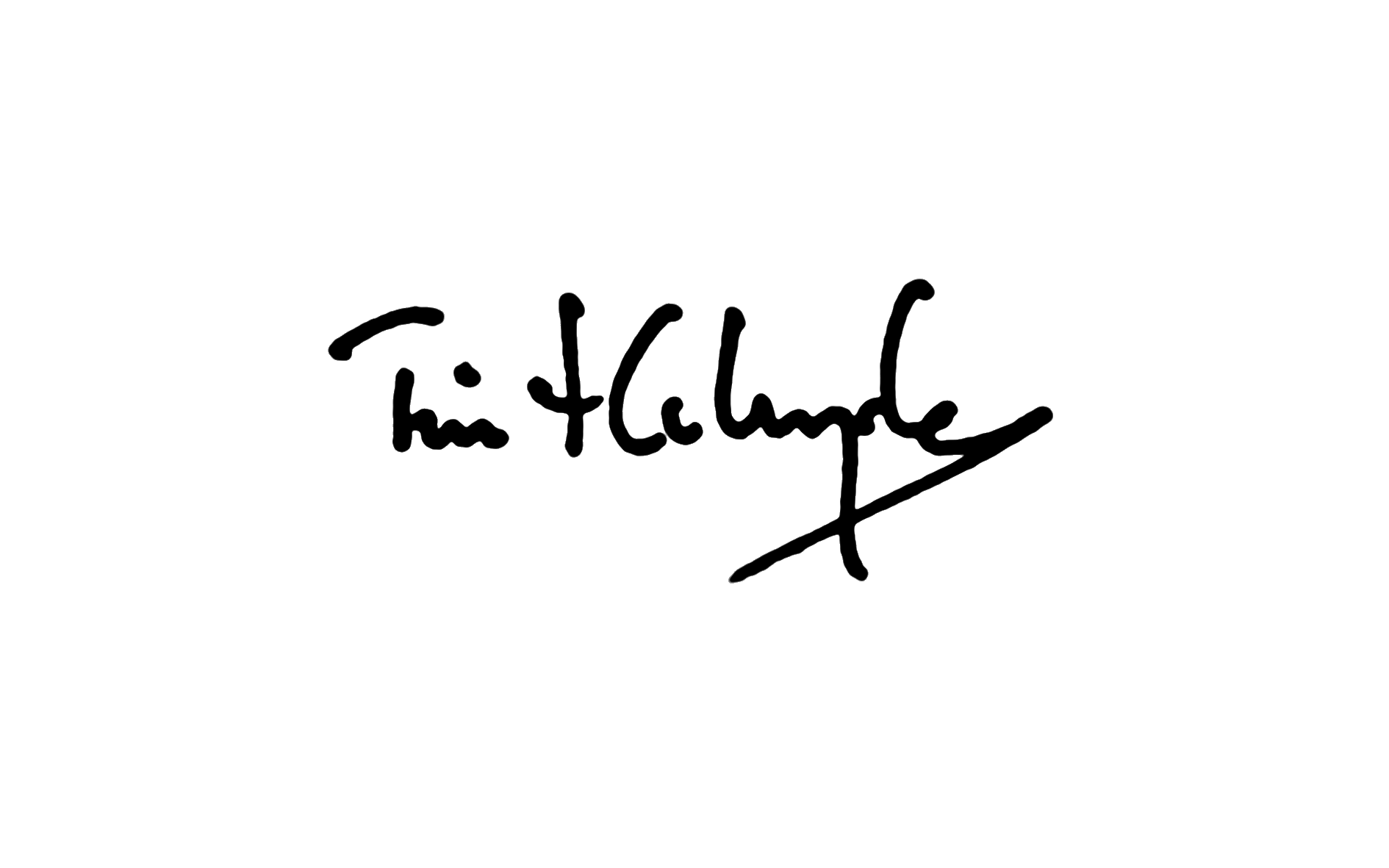
- Signature

Sir Timothy Victor Holroyde, PC (born 18 August 1955), is a retired English Court of Appeal judge, previously a judge of the High Court of Justice of England and Wales, Queen's Bench Division. He was appointed to the Court of Appeal in October 2017. He was sworn of the Privy Council in 2017. In 2015, he was appointed a member of the Sentencing Council for England and Wales, and served as its Chairman between 2018 and 2022. In June 2022, he was appointed Vice-President of the Court of Appeal (Criminal Division), succeeding Lord Justice Fulford. He has also been a Bencher of the Middle Temple since March 2005.

== Education ==
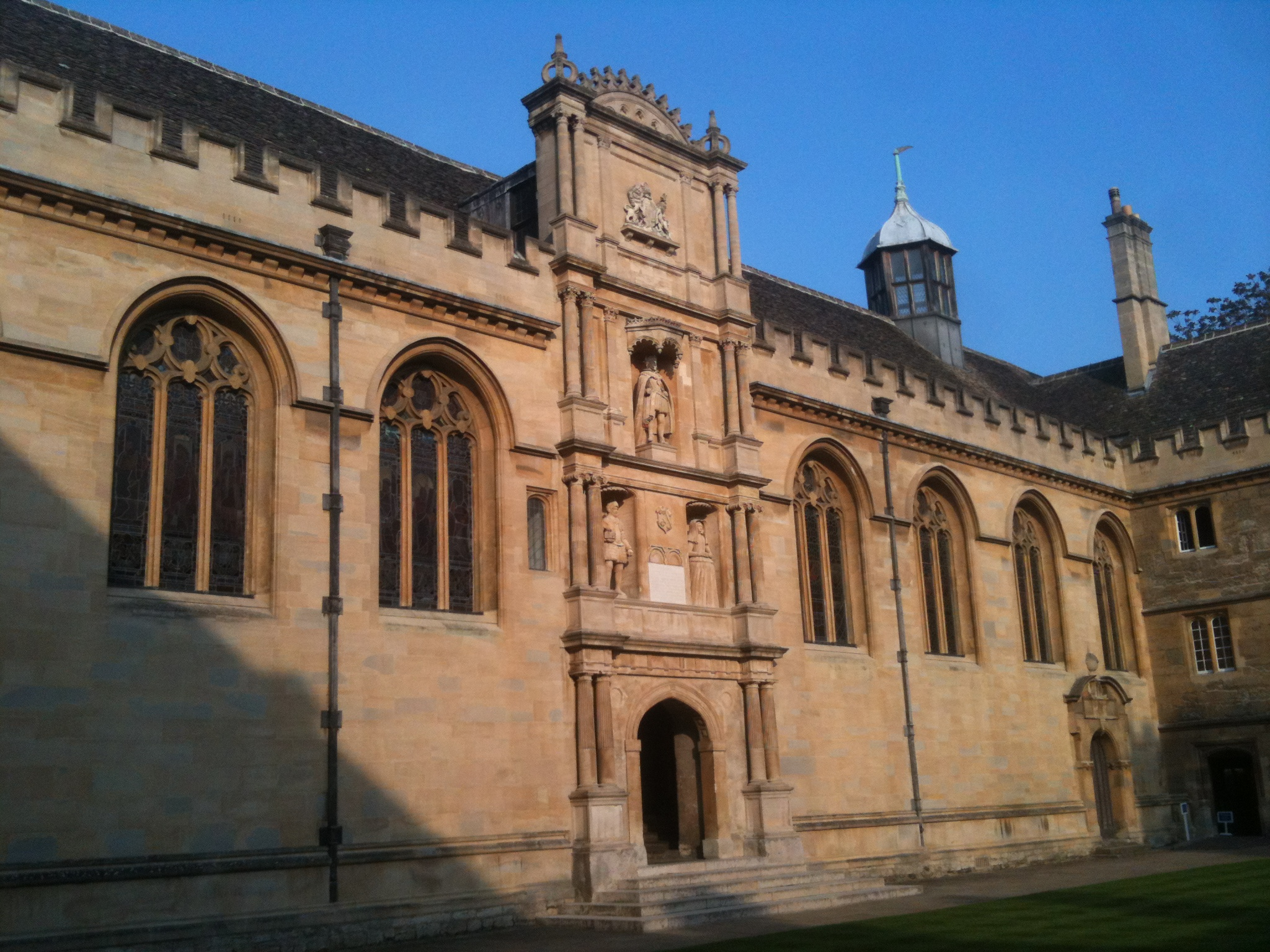
Wadham College, University of Oxford

Timothy Holroyde was educated at Bristol Grammar School and Wadham College, Oxford, where he attained a Bachelors in Jurisprudence. He was called to the Bar in November 1977 (Middle Temple). As a barrister, he practised from Exchange Chambers, Liverpool. He was appointed Queen's Counsel in 1996, and was appointed to the High Court in January 2009. From 2012 he was a Presiding Judge of the Northern Circuit.

== Legal career ==
As a barrister, he appeared as counsel for the prosecution in the trial that followed the 2004 Morecambe Bay cockling disaster.

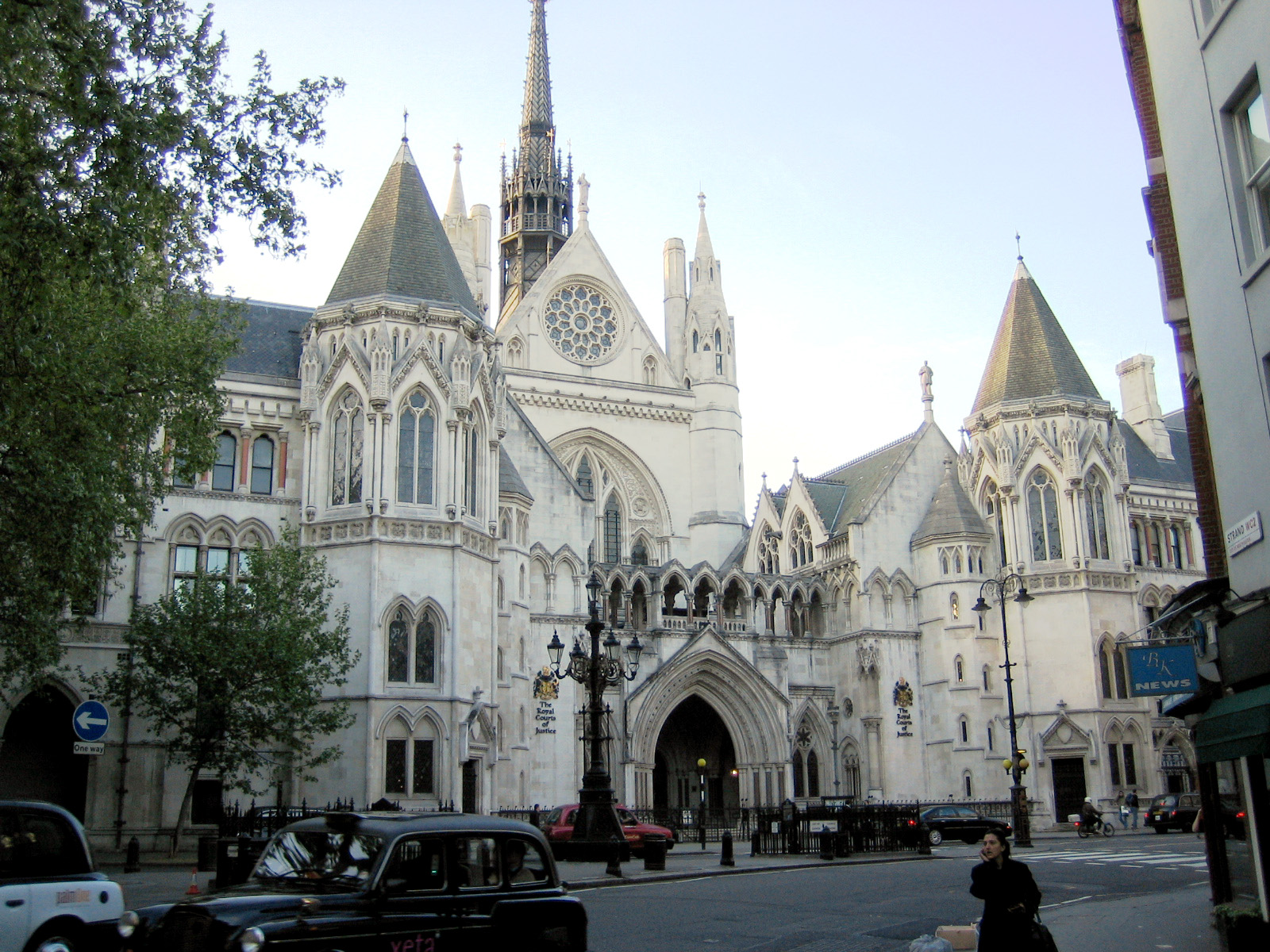
The Royal Courts of Justice which house the Court of Appeal where Holroyde was a Lord Justice of Appeal.

In 2012, Holroyde presided over the seven-month trial of Asil Nadir on fraud charges. Other cases included the trial of Anjem Choudary in 2016 for terrorist-related offences, and that of Dale Cregan in 2013 for crimes including the murders of PC Fiona Bone and PC Nicola Hughes. In 2021, he presided over the British Post Office scandal case in the Court of Appeal, in which the convictions of 39 sub-postmasters for theft, false accounting and/or fraud were quashed.

In July 2024, Holroyde was awarded an honorary doctorate by Edge Hill University in recognition of his contributions to the legal profession and connection with the local community.

He retired from his role as a Lord Justice of Appeal on 25 October 2025.
