= Trerose =

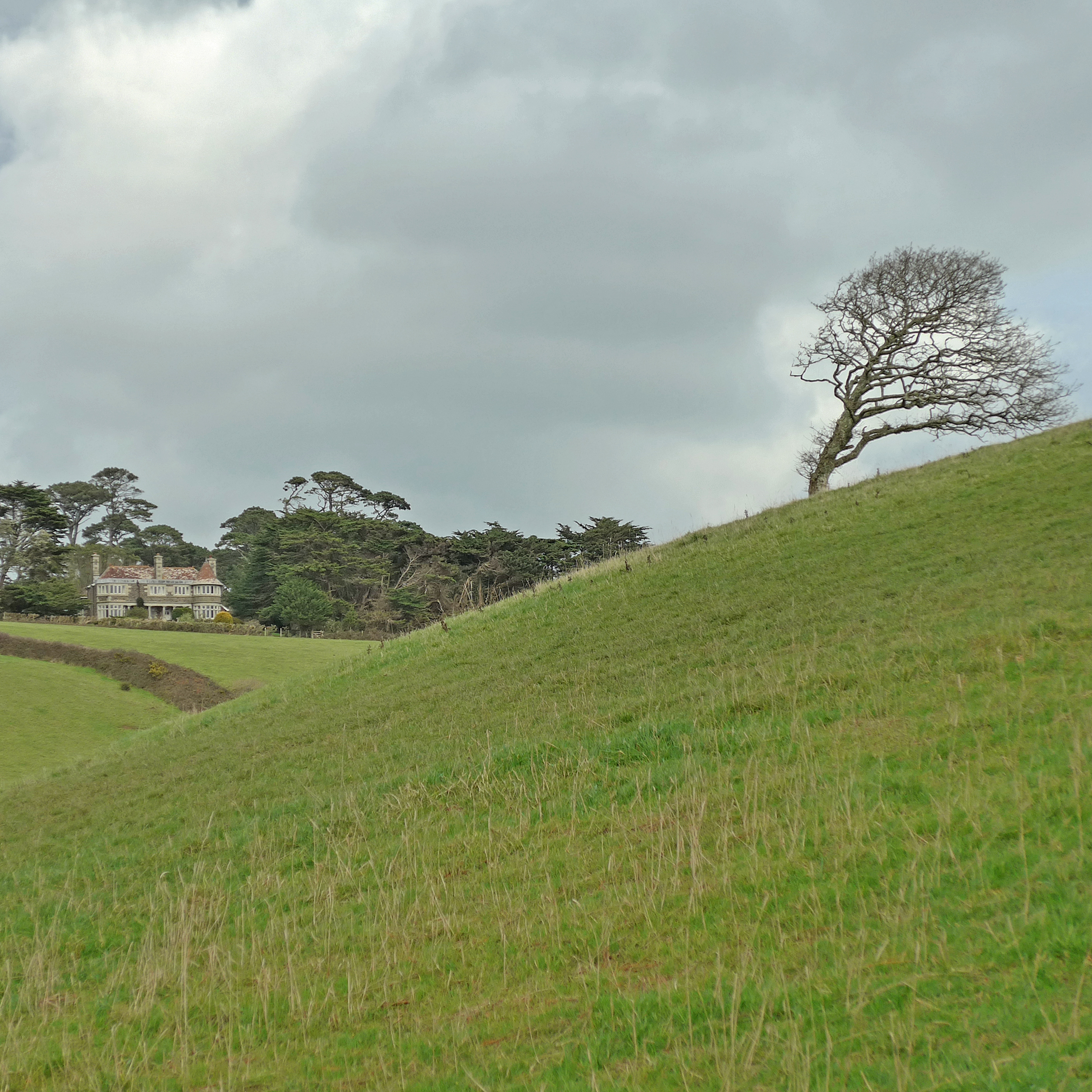
Trerose

Trerose is a hamlet north of Mawnan, Cornwall, England, United Kingdom.
