= Janet Henry (economist) =

British economist

- Born: 11 February 1969 (age 57); Bristol, United Kingdom
- Education: University College London
- Occupation: Economist
- Title: Global Chief Economist at HSBC

Janet Henry (born 11 February 1969 in Bristol) is a British economist who has served as the Global Chief Economist at HSBC since 2015.

== Career ==
Henry was born in Bristol in 1969 where she attended Bristol Grammar School, an independent day school. She later studied economics at University College London (UCL), graduating in 1990. Henry followed her older brother in studying economics and later on stuck with her studies as she learned to appreciate economics and politics, while being quite proficient at the subject. During her academic years, pursuing a career in finance was not her ambition.

After graduating from UCL, Henry aspired to become a foreign correspondent at the Financial Times, however Henry began her career as an Assistant Economist, analysing economic data for Asia under the Economic Intelligence Unit in 1991, and later become the main analyst in 1994. The EIU provides business and governments with economic data, and provides detailed reports on trending business challenges through a client based operation. While her time at the EIU, she relocated from London to Hong Kong, where she was later scouted by a former EIU colleague to join HSBC near the beginning of the Asian financial crisis.

By 1996, Henry started her career with HSBC at HSBC Securities as an Asia Economist for two years before moving to HSBCIB (Investment Banking) as a Global Economist for 8 years. Henry later on became the Chief European Economist in 2007 for 8 years and finally her current position as Global Chief Economist in 2015. Janet Henry will be replacing Stephen D. King as he takes the role Senior Economic Advisor after being with the bank for 17 years. Henry will be responsible for HSBC's economic forecasts and reporting to the head of research David May.

Henry is also a member of Handelsblatt's Shadow ECB Council.

== LSE Emerging Markets Forum 2018 ==
Henry spoke at the London School of Economics' 9th annual Emerging Markets Forum that was hosted in London, United Kingdom. The two-day forum was held at De Vere Grand Connaught Rooms between 9 and 10 March. This conference invited over 200 global leaders in the economic field ranging in different industries including real estate, pharmaceuticals and finance. This event also hosted a wide range of media coverage including Bloomberg, The Economist, and BBC News.

Henry participated in a panel discussion on 9 March named "Central Banking and FX – Looking for a route in turbulent waters; Emerging markets challenges in the rate normalisation era", which included five other speakers from the industry, hosted by Esteban Lee, Speakers officer of LSE and moderated by Lyubov Pronina, Bloomberg EMEA reporter.

== Global Female Leaders 2019 ==
Henry will be attending the Global Female Leaders Summit between 12 and 14 May. The summit focuses on gathering female leaders from different industries to share about their successes and experiences, contributing to the dialogue of women empowerment in society. The summit is designed to promote dialogue around how female business individuals can make an impact in the growing global climate of economics and business relations to better improve diversity and use leadership skills between both men and women.

== Publications and appearances ==
=== HSBC News and Insight article ===
On 17 October 2018 Henry published an article named "Diverging fortunes for world economies" on HSBC's News and Insights section of their website. She discusses economic growth trend of several states, mentioning that the United States are benefiting off of personal tax cuts and low unemployment and have contributed to their high rate of consumer confidence. Henry continues on to state that after raising their 2018 growth forecast for the United States to 3%, their estimate for global growth for 2018 to be 3%, followed by 2.7% in 2019 and 2.5% in 2020.

Henry states that emerging economies have long-run potential in growth compared to pre-existing developed countries. Emerging economies have advantages in demographics and will to grow rapidly if they continue to improve social infrastructures and programs such as education, health care, and technological advances. According to Henry's model projections, China will outgrow the United States as the largest economy by 2030, in addition to India growing ahead of Germany and Japan as the third largest economy.

=== HSBC Insights video ===
On 25 March 2019 Henry appeared in a HSBC Insights video "The world slows down—Central banks pivot on interest rates in case downturn worsens". In the video, Henry discusses the reasons behind the central bank pivots due to a slowdown in global economic growth and inflation. She forecasts that by the midyear of 2019, China will stabilise and the United States growth will revive after the recent government shutdown. She mentions that two sectors are particularly impactful to the economic downturn, the auto and electronic industries, both of which account for a majority of production in countries like South Korea and Germany. Henry predicts that economic growth will not rapidly grow globally solely from a US-China trade deal because of rising tensions arising between US and European countries. She concludes that federal interest rate setters will cut in 2020, but that will be dependent on the expectations of the effects of a rising inflation rate to prevent the dollar from rising.

=== Bloomberg ===
On 7 August 2018 Lucy Meakin and Jeanna Smialek from Bloomberg Markets interviewed three women who are now Chief Economists in the world's few largest banks. The article "These Three Women Made It to Chief Economist at Big Banks. Here's How They Got There" included Henry as one of the three women. Through this interview, Henry discussed some of the difficulties and experiences of being a woman in her occupation. She mentioned that when she joined HSBC back in 1996, she was the only woman on her global economics team and now 13 out of 39 of her global group are women. Bloomberg highlights Henry's recent accomplishments, such as forecasting that the European Central bank will undergo quantitative easing or warning that the U.S. tightening of finances along rising oil prices and President Trump's "aggressive trade policies" will harm the global economy.

Henry laughs while describing her career, saying that "A lot of the progress in my career happened as a consequence of the euro crisis. You're always going to have a higher profile as an economist when things are not going well."
