= Wallingford Museum =

Local museum in Wallingford, England

Coordinates: 51.60111°N 1.12756°W

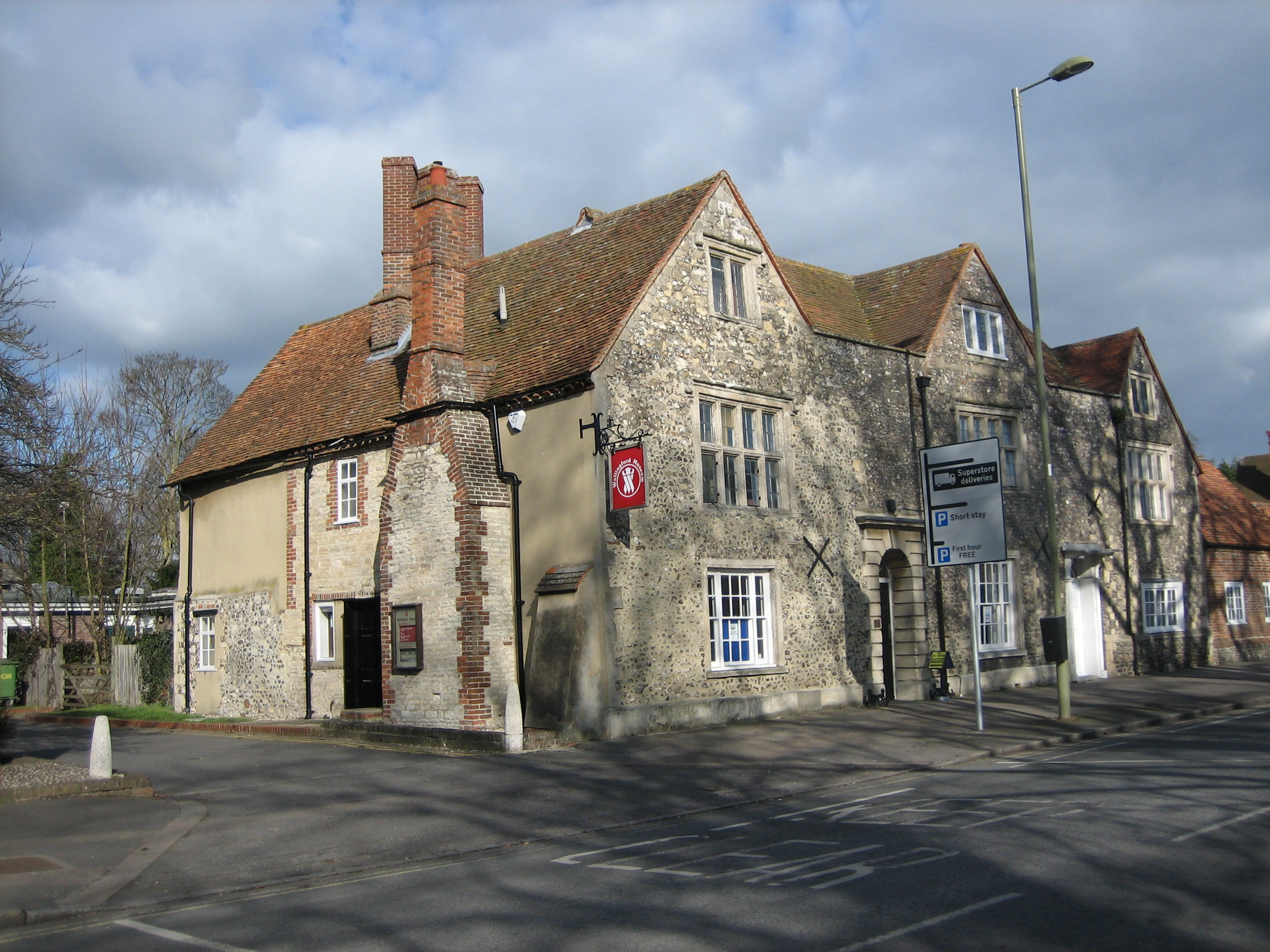
Wallingford Museum

Wallingford Museum is a museum with collections of local interest in the town of Wallingford in the English county of Oxfordshire. The museum has an extensive collection relating to the town's history. Displays include archaeology, Wallingford Castle, and the town in medieval and Victorian times. A free audio tour is available.

The museum is housed in Flint House, a grade II listed Tudor timber-framed house with a mid-16th-century frame and a 17th-century flint façade. It is in the High Street and faces the Kinecroft, an open space in Wallingford which is bordered on two sides by Anglo-Saxon burh defences built in the 9th century.

The Museum, which is fully accredited, is run entirely by volunteers. Wallingford Museum is an independent charitable company registered in England & Wales.
