= Catalogue of Scientific Papers =

Defunct catalogue of academic journal articles

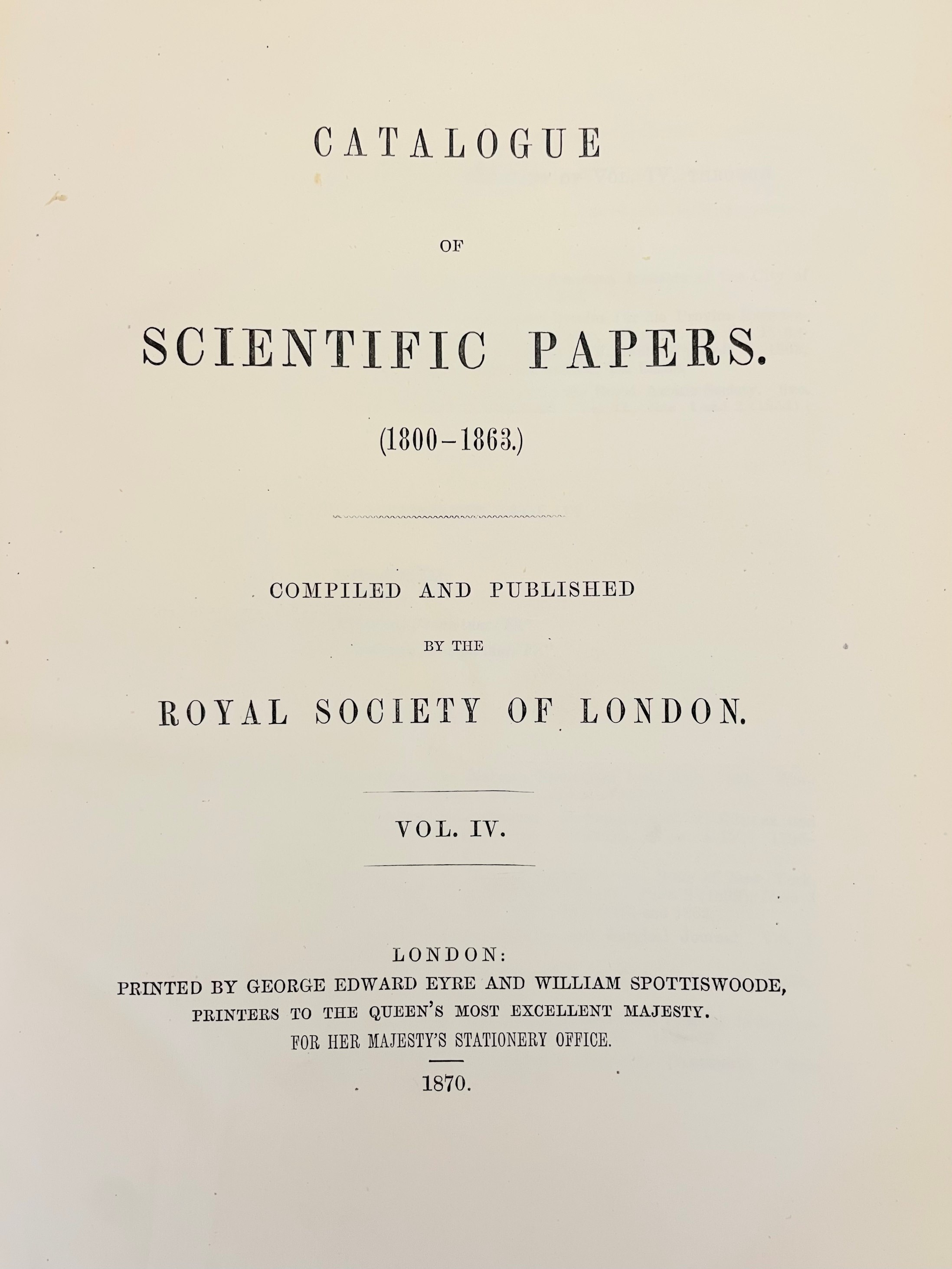
Catalogue of Scientific Papers 1870

The Catalogue of Scientific Papers was an attempt by the Royal Society of London to catalogue all papers published in scientific periodicals back to the year 1800 and produce a bibliographic index organised by author. The first volume was published in 1867 and it ran until 1901. From 1902 it was continued in an expanded form as the International Catalogue of Scientific Literature.

The original idea came from an American engineer, Edward Hunt, who suggested it to the first secretary of the Smithsonian Institution, Joseph Henry. Henry, however, was concerned that the newly formed Smithsonian did not have sufficient resource to undertake the task and so in 1855 he proposed it to the British Association for the Advancement of Science who set up a committee to explore the idea and to define its scope. In 1857, the British Association came to the conclusion that it would be a suitable project for the Royal Society to undertake. The Society's Council agreed and cataloguing work started the following year.

== Bibliography ==
- Royal Society (1800–1900). Catalogue of scientific papers. 17 vols. Eyre & Spottiswoode.
