= Malcolm Barrow =

British tea and tung planter and politician (1900-1973)

Sir Malcolm Palliser Barrow, CBE (1900 – 9 June 1973) was a British tea and tung planter in Nyasaland and politician in the Federation of Rhodesia and Nyasaland.

He was Deputy Prime Minister, Minister of Internal Affairs, Minister of Home Affairs, Minister of Commerce and Industry, Minister of Defence, Minister of Economic Affairs, and Minister of Power.
