= Benjamin Disraeli Goldberg =

Irish lawyer and politician (born 1902)

Parliamentary Secretary to the Ministry of Home Affairs
- In office 1956–1958

Minister of Education and Minister of Public Health
- In office 1958–1963

Personal details
- Born: 1902 Dublin, Ireland
- Education: University of Cape Town

Benjamin Disraeli Goldberg (born 1902) was an Irish-born Rhodesian lawyer and politician.

Born in Dublin, Goldberg went to Southern Rhodesia as a boy. Educated at the Boys' High School, Salisbury and the University of Cape Town, he qualified as a solicitor and practised in Umtali.

He was Parliamentary Secretary to the Ministry of Home Affairs of the Federation of Rhodesia and Nyasaland from 1956 to 1958, and Minister of Education and Minister of Public Health from 1958 to 1963.
