= Bristol Grammar School =

Private day school in Bristol, England

Location
- University Road; Bristol, BS8 1SR; England; 51.457965°N 2.604748°W

Information
- Other name: BGS
- Type: Private day school Grammar school
- Motto: Latin: Ex Spinis Uvas (Grapes From Thorns)
- Established: 1532; 494 years ago
- Founders: Robert and Nicholas Thorne
- Local authority: Bristol City Council
- Department for Education URN: 109369 Tables
- Headmaster: Jaideep Barot
- Gender: Mixed
- Age range: 4–18
- Enrolment: 1,389 (2024)
- Capacity: 1,410
- Houses: Glenn's; Parratt's; Clare's; Bramley's; Scott's; Short's
- Colours: Maroon and navy
- Song: Carmen Bristoliense
- Publication: View; Bristolienses
- Alumni: Old Bristolians
- Website: www.bristolgrammarschool.co.uk
- "Bristol Grammar School, registered charity no. 1104425". Charity Commission for England and Wales.

Bristol Grammar School (BGS) is a 4–18 mixed, private day school in Bristol, England. It was founded in 1532 by Royal Charter for the teaching of 'good manners and literature', endowed by wealthy Bristol merchants Robert Thorne and his brother Nicholas. Robert Thorne made much of his fortune in Seville, where he employed slaves in his soap factory.

The school flourished in the early 20th century under headmaster Sir Cyril Norwood (1906–1916), embodying "the ideals and experiences of a leading public school". Norwood went on to serve as the master at Marlborough College and Harrow, and as president of St John's College, Oxford.

The headmaster, Jaideep Barot MA MSc, is a member of the Headmasters' and Headmistresses' Conference (HMC) and was appointed in September 2018. The school was first cited in the Public Schools Year Book in 1907, and former headmaster John Mackay (1960–1975) served as the chairman of the HMC in 1970. Founded as an all-boys school, Bristol Grammar is now fully co-educational having first admitted girls in 1980. The school counts among its alumni prominent personalities including Nobel laureate Sir John Pople, former British ambassador to the US Lord Oliver Franks, and founder of Penguin Books Sir Allen Lane. It has educated members of both houses of the UK Parliament and has a strong legal tradition, having educated three present Lord Justices of Appeal (Sirs Rabinder Singh, Mark Warby and Timothy Holroyde).

The school is divided into four sections: the Infant School (ages 4–6), the Junior School (ages 6–11), the Senior School (ages 11–16) and Sixth Form (ages 16–18). The Junior School was ranked in 2016 by The Good Schools Guide as one of the best value prep schools in the UK. The Senior School and Sixth Form rank academically amongst the best performing independent schools in South West England.

== History ==
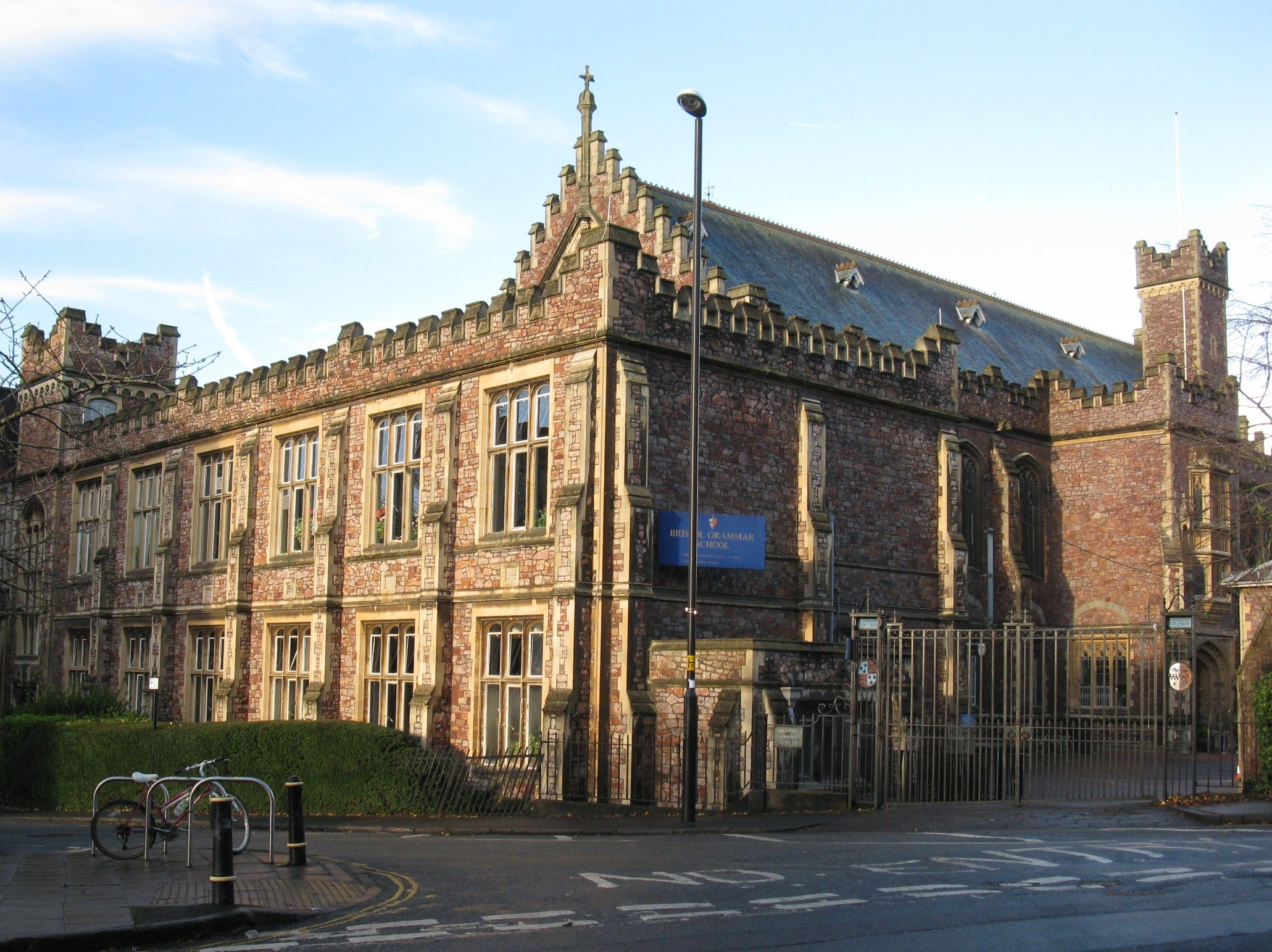
University Road Entrance

The school was founded on 17 March 1532 by merchant brothers Robert and Nicholas Thorne. Robert lived primarily in Seville where he owned enslaved African people. The school at the time was based in the St Bartholomew's Hospital, as part of the new founding of schools after Henry VIII's closure of the monasteries, where previously a large proportion of England's education had occurred. The school motto Ex Spinis Uvas, which translates as "Grapes From Thorns", is a play upon the names of the school founders Robert and Nicholas Thorne.

The Grammar Scole at Frome Gate was in the care of its first schoolmaster, Thomas Moffat, when good fortune stepped in to secure its future. The Thorne family were wealthy Bristol merchants, friends of men like John Cabot and known to royalty. They wished to endow a school where the sons of Bristol merchants and tradesmen could receive an education. On 17 March 1532, Henry VIII issued a Charter under which the Thornes could endow the Grammar School and establish it in larger premises at St Bartholomew's Hospital near the bottom of Christmas Steps. There the boys learnt Latin and Greek, Divinity and some Hebrew.

By 1767, the buildings were cramped. Charles Lee, the Master, persuaded the Corporation that the Grammar School should be allowed to exchange premises with the other City School, Queen Elizabeth's Hospital, which had a pleasant, new site on Unity Street, further up the hill. This exchange was carried out, and Charles Lee proceeded to enjoy his new school by greatly reducing the numbers of boys. The School was set to rights in 1812, but education was moving away from the classics and this caused further problems resulting in the school being closed in 1844. It received a new scheme in 1847 and re-opened in January 1848 with 300 pupils.

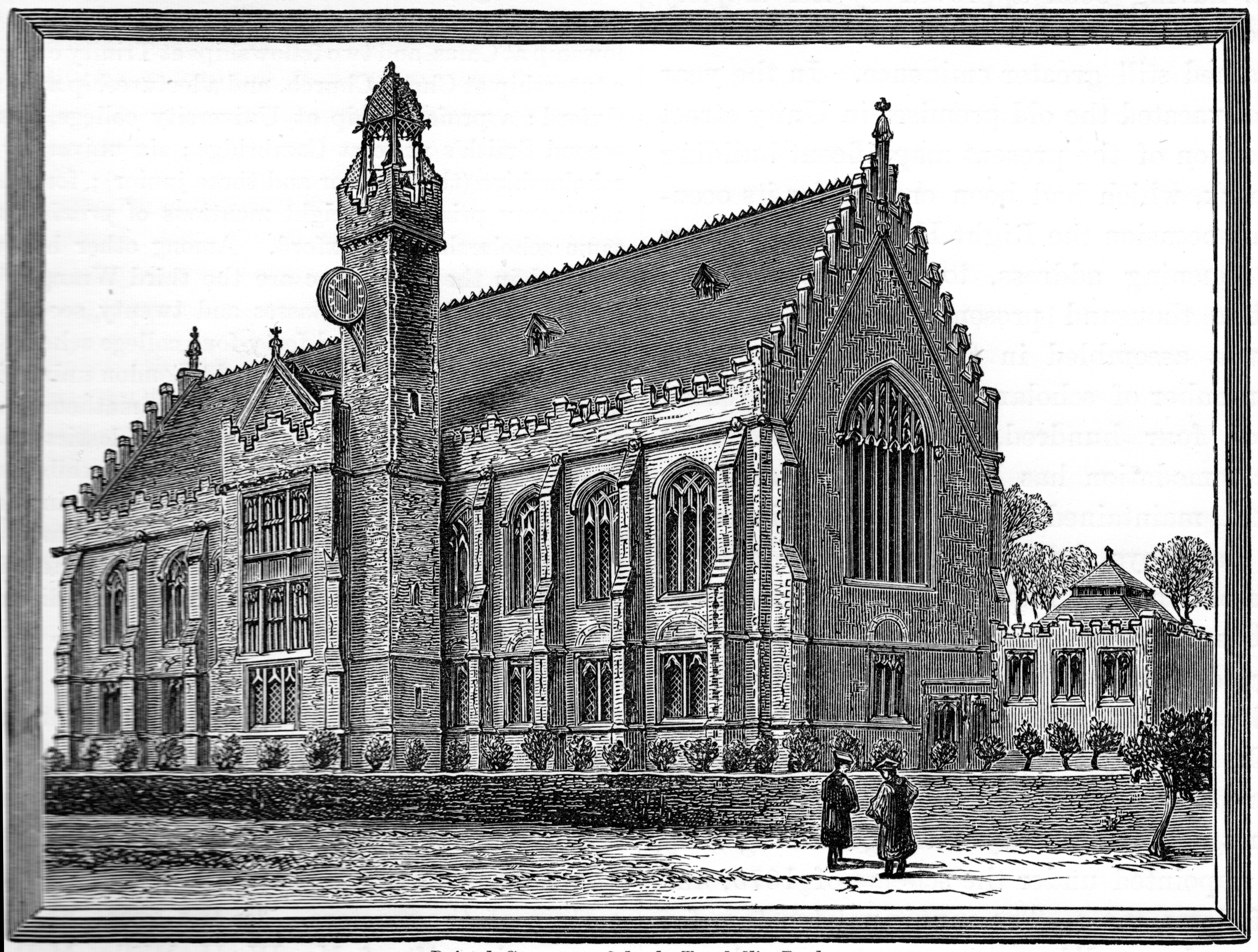
Bristol Grammar School at Tyndall's Park in 1882

By 1870 the headmaster (Rev John William Caldicott) told the Endowed Schools Commission that the school was "full to overflowing" with 240 boys. However, it was significantly less well endowed than Bristol's other secondary schools (Queen Elizabeth's, Red Maids' and Colston's), and its now dilapidated buildings were located in the wrong area of the city for pupils who mostly lived in Clifton and Redland. At that time, Bristol had substantial hospital endowments (second only to London and Edinburgh) but these were mostly spent on charity rather than education. The assistant charity commissioner proposed a scheme that would reorganise the objectives of the endowed schools and secure funding for the Grammar School and the new Clifton High School for Girls. After several years of debate and negotiation the initiative was approved in 1875, and in 1877 a new location in Tyndall's Park was agreed.

The first buildings in Tyndalls Park were occupied in 1879: the Big School, with its Great Hall, and the Headmaster's House, a modest dwelling which is now the Junior School. Further classrooms were added, a Gymnasium and a Fives Court and a Rifle Range. These have been rebuilt as art rooms and rehearsal rooms, but the Winterstoke wing still houses the laboratories which were added in 1914. The Preparatory School began in 1900, and in 1928 moved into its own building on Elton Road, but this was destroyed on the night of 24 November 1940 by incendiary bombs.

The Prep Hall, which survived, is now the Mackay Theatre. The Elton Road ruin was rebuilt as classrooms under John Garrett, who added the University Road block and began to colonise the other side of Elton Road. Since then, the school has built yet more classroom accommodation and a new sports hall; Modern Languages, Classics, Geography and Art have their own Elton Road Houses, and the former playing field is now the Design and Technology Centre.

The school became a direct grant grammar school in 1946 as a result of the Education Act 1944 and chose to become independent in 1979 when direct grants were abolished by the 1974–9 Labour Government.

In 1980 the school became fully coeducational, having admitted girls to the Sixth Form for the previous two years.

=== Houses ===
There are six Houses in the Senior School, each named after its Head of House. Each student is placed in one of the six House groups at the beginning of their time in the Senior School, remaining in the House until they leave school. House activities include plays, music competitions and inter-House sporting tournaments.

The House names and colours are:

- Scott's (black)
- Parratt's (yellow)
- Clare’s (blue)
- Glenn's (red)
- Short's (brown)
- Bramley's (green)

Between 1894 and 1939 the school also had a boarding house, Thorne Lodge, situated on Oakfield Grove in Clifton. The boarding house masters were J. G. Holmes (1894-1911), F. G. Beauchamp (1911-28) and R. J. McGregor (1929-39).

==== Colours ====
House colours are awarded, given at the end of the term should that person perform well in an activity or sport.

School colours are awarded to pupils typically in their final year, who perform exceptionally well in sport or any other school activity. They would be expected to compete in a school team (such as Cricket, Rugby, Hockey or Football) and show continued commitment. This was extended to include performing arts, awarding several students colours for their contribution to concerts, plays and taking House assemblies.

== Tutors and teaching ==
The size of teaching groups ranges from 25 students per teacher in lower years to occasionally one per teacher (for less popular subjects in the sixth form). Optional subjects include Russian and Economics. All students have access to computers with internet access as well as their own iPads provided by the school.

The school offers Ancient Greek as a subject from Year 9 onwards, and Classical Civilisation is also available now as a GCSE.

=== Sport ===
During the autumn term, the sport curriculum is dominated by rugby for the boys and hockey for the girls. During the spring term, it is dominated by hockey, football, and rugby for the boys and netball for the girls.

During the summer term, there is a division between cricket for the boys and for the girls. Both sexes may participate in sports such as tennis and athletics.

The school owns a large area of land in Failand which features two AstroTurf hockey pitches, tarmac tennis/netball courts, five cricket pitches, nine rugby pitches, two football pitches and a 3G astro pitch. There is an athletics track as well as shot and javelin areas. Full-time grounds staff are employed. Sport is compulsory one afternoon a week for every year-group up to, and including, year 11. A new pavilion has been built as part of the 475th anniversary expansion of the school, replacing the old pavilion. There is now a larger car park and better coach access. The new pavilion provides facilities for up to 350 pupils and staff at a time with improved showering and changing facilities as well as an attractive hospitality area for spectators. The total cost of the project was £2.4 million.

This is in addition to the sports hall on the Tyndall's Park campus, which supplements the one afternoon a week pupils spend doing sport with around another hour or so a week of PE within the school day.

The school rugby team won the U15 1991 Daily Mail Cup and came runner-up in the same competition in 1995. Bristol Grammar has a sporting rivalry with fellow Bristol public school Clifton College.

=== Model United Nations ===
Bristol Grammar has been successful at Model United Nations for a number of years now, holding their own conference BGSMUN, in February, since 2007. These conferences, presided over by the school's own Secretaries General, include chairing teams of BGS Sixth Form students. Various schools are invited to compete, with Exeter College winning the 2015 conference. The school's own team has been particularly successful in recent years, winning Best Delegation at both Exeter College MUN and MUNCH.

== Campus ==
Bristol Grammar School occupies a triangle of land between the University of Bristol on the University Road side, what used to be Dingle's department store on the lower side and a series of houses on the Elton Road side known as Tyndalls Park. The school has been expanding, and while it has long owned all the houses to one side of the main campus until recently only four (Barton's, Norwood's, Martin's and Garrett's) were occupied. Most of the houses have now had their leases relinquished and have been converted into teaching space.

=== Great Hall ===
The foundation stone was laid on 10 June 1877 and the school moved in during 1879. It is the largest first floor hall in the United Kingdom. In 1996, the old servery was removed and the hall was restored to its old layout; the roof was also renewed during this time. There is a full kitchen between the Great Hall and the Science Wing, as well as two classrooms and an office belonging to the history department. Underneath the Great Hall is the Staff Room, the Pople Room, and the school offices. It has been designated by English Heritage as a grade II listed building.

To one side of the Great Hall, sitting separate from the Hall itself and the Junior School, is another building designed to blend in. During the 1940s/1950s, this was the woodworking department, and later a staff work room. It is now a Music room which is also used for House Assemblies.

The Great Hall foundation stone has never been found. Inside the foundation stone there is a time capsule, reported to contain "Copies of The Times and of the Bristol newspapers and a parchment document containing an account of the ceremony". However, despite extensive searches of the outer walls, it has not been found. Two possibilities exist - that the foundation stone was placed at the far end of the building where the Science wing now is, and was destroyed or covered up when that building was erected; or that the stone is buried under tarmac towards the front of the building. The foundation stone was laid on 10 June 1877.

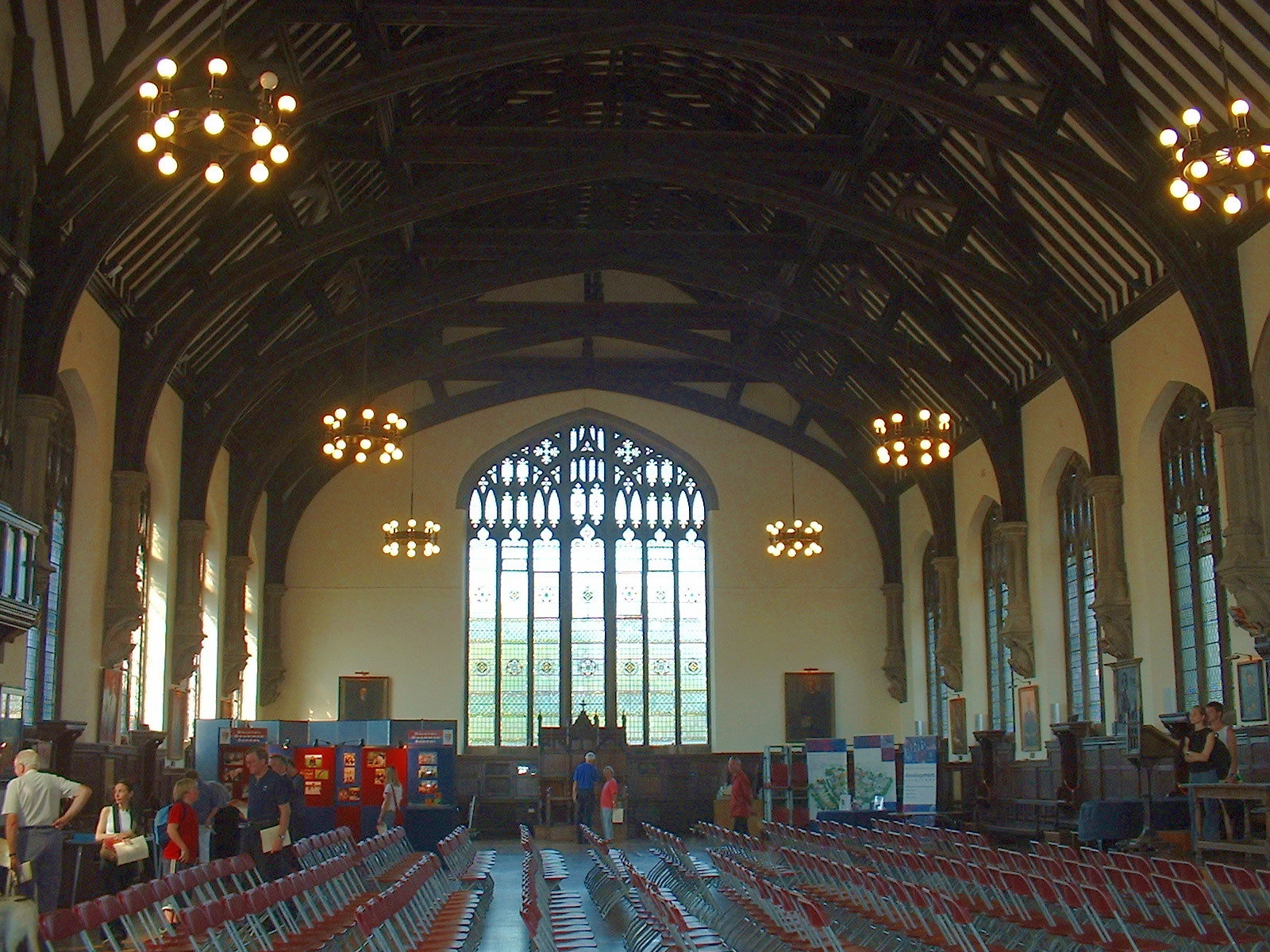
Great Hall

The Big School was designed in the late Perpendicular Gothic style, by the Bristol firm of Foster and Wood. Sometimes known as the Long Room, but now usually as the Great Hall, it was designed as a teaching room, and the Masters' stalls are still in place.

The room is 140 feet (43 m) long, 50 feet (15 m) wide and 50 feet (15 m) high. Downstairs there are now, as in 1879, the Headmaster's Study, the Senior Common Room, offices and classrooms. Originally these would have accommodated the Sixth Form, while the rest of the school had lessons together in the Hall.

The organ, which was built by Vowles & Son of St James' Square, was presented by William Wills, 1st Baron Winterstoke, in January 1880. It cost over £1,000 and it is still played for assemblies and concerts. Nowadays, the organ would cost at least £2 million.

The main stairs leading out of the Great Hall have been modified to fulfil fire and safety regulations and in preparation for the new library and Sixth Form building known as The Hub. When the whole school assembled in the Great Hall for the official opening of the new staircase, the invited guests included people who donated large sums of money to help get the project on its way and some of the OBs, including John Pople, who have supported the school. This work was permitted due to work done by the school's archivist who demonstrated that this was the way that the original staircase was likely to have been. This satisfied the authorities sufficiently that they granted permission to make structural alterations to the Grade II listed building. The Hub project however, was cancelled by the, then, new Headmaster, Roderick MacKinnon, so the planned building, which was popular among students, was discarded. This was mainly due to financing issues as building the hub would be very expensive (at least £1 million).

The staircase was originally one big staircase which started at ground level, led up and split into two smaller ones which doubled back to reach the Great Hall. This has now been reversed; two smaller staircases lead up and merge into a larger one which doubles back to reach the Great Hall. This meant that the wall between the two smaller staircases could be knocked through to insert a modern automated double glass door allowing pupils to reach the Great Hall with greater ease from within the campus. The old entrance with the great wooden doors at the front still remains. Previously a small door to the campus side of the building was for visitors, teachers and Prefects only.

The School has re-purposed the Elton Road block, and changed the Mackay Theatre into a mixed use space for the music school. Most of the teaching rooms in this block are now used for this purpose. The block has been extended with a new 245 seat (standard layout) theatre, and additional rehearsal/teaching space, and is named the 1532 Performing Arts Centre. This centre fits between the Elton Road Block and the Princess Anne Block. This is one of the biggest building jobs on the main campus since 1994 when the Design & Technology Centre was built in the centre of the site.

== School song ==
Carmen Bristoliense (Song of the Bristolians) is the school song of Bristol Grammar School, which is sung in Latin. The song was written in 1909 by Headmaster Cyril Norwood, and set to music by the Director of Music, C. W. Stear. It is sung in the final school assembly each term, and at other school or related events such as the annual prize giving ceremony and old boys' (and girls') dinners. The song consists of four verses and a chorus, although usually only the first verse and chorus are sung. The fifth line was updated from Norwood's original on the 400th anniversary of the school's founding.

== Headmasters ==
Until the 19th century, the Headmaster was known simply as the "Master" and his assistants as "Ushers". Little is known of those of the 16th century and nothing of any before Thomas Moffat, the "scolemaster" of the City Audit Book of 1532 who took the School to the Bartholomews. The first few dates are conjectural.
