= 1993 reviews of the British honours system =

Changing of honours

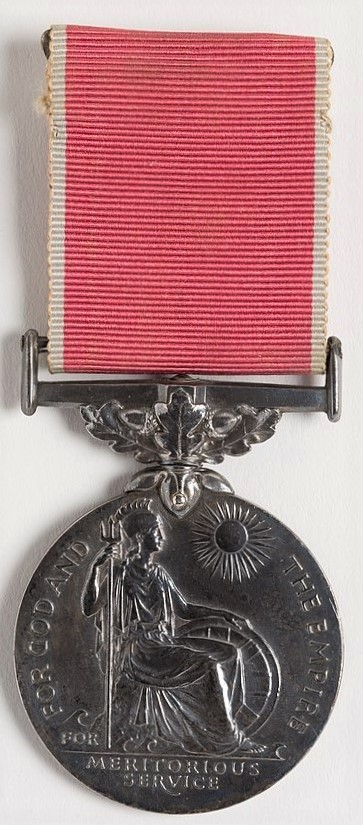
Major's reforms ended awards of the British Empire Medal.

In 1993 two separate reviews reported on the British honours system. The first, under prime minister John Major, reported in March and focused on civilian awards. The second was started in March, at Major's suggestion, and carried out by the Ministry of Defence. Major's review abolished the minimum rank requirements for certain civilian awards when made to military personnel and ended the practice of making awards purely on the basis of the recipient holding a certain appointment in the public or private sector (with the exception of High Court judges who were still to automatically become knights or dames). Major's review also ended the award of the British Empire Medal (BEM) and Imperial Service Order (ISO), compensated for by increasing the number of awards made to the Order of the British Empire. As a means of increasing the proportion of awards made to community figures and the voluntary sector, he introduced direct nominations from the general public.

The outcome of the military review was reported by Minister of Defence Malcolm Rifkind in October 1993. It was largely focused on gallantry awards. The basic structure of the awards was retained but all distinctions of rank were removed, with officers and other ranks to receive the same awards for the same actions. Generally the officer-level awards were retained (and opened to all ranks) and the other ranks award abolished. A new Conspicuous Gallantry Cross was created as the second-level operational gallantry award for all ranks, as the previous officer-level award (the Distinguished Service Order) was to henceforth be awarded for leadership and not gallantry. The review considered creating a medal for the mention in despatches award but decided against this, though the existing insignia, an oak leaf, was upgraded to silver (from bronze). The Queen's Commendation for Valuable Service in the Air, which had been awarded for both gallantry and meritorious conduct, was abolished and replaced with new medals: the Queen's Commendation for Valuable Service, which awarded meritorious conduct in all theatres, and the Queen's Commendation for Bravery in the Air for non-operational gallantry. The award of the Queen's Commendation for Brave Conduct was ended and replaced with the Queen's Commendation for Bravery for other non-operational gallantry.

== Background ==
The Conservative Party leader John Major was Prime Minister of the United Kingdom from 1990 to 1997. He was keen to move towards a classless society and, as part of this, carried out a review of the British honours system. The focus of the honours system had historically been civil servants, rewarded for performing their job roles. Labour Party prime minister Harold Wilson had attempted to broaden the honours lists in the 1960s and 1970s to include more celebrity figures but this had faced opposition and his 1976 Prime Minister's Resignation Honours led to scandal. Major's predecessor as Conservative Party leader and prime minister, Margaret Thatcher had directed the civil service to increase the award of honours to those from the private and voluntary sectors but most awards still went to those on the public payroll. Those administering the system told Thatcher it would be hard to achieve her aims without reform of the system and she lacked the political will to carry this out. She did reintroduce honours for political service, phased out by Wilson, as rewards for her party members, and these rose to make up around 20% of the honours lists. The honours system came under attack during the 1980s, with works by Labour Research (1983), journalist Michael De-la-Noy (1985) and John Walker (1986) criticising honours made by Thatcher to party donors. De-la-Noy considered the honours system socially divisive and Walker thought it lacked transparency, making it hard to judge if awards were made corruptly. An article in The Economist in 1987 stated that only those honours given to "ordinary people who give public service" were really defensible and argued for the abolition of those award for political and civil service.

Prior to Major's review the system had remained largely unchanged for 70 years. Many honours, civil and military, were restricted to recipients of certain rank. In the military officers received gallantry awards described as crosses (for example the Air Force Cross) while the other ranks received medals (for example the Air Force Medal). The only gallantry medal without distinction to rank was the highest, the Victoria Cross. This carried across to the civilian awards with other ranks generally not entitled to appointment to orders such as the Order of the British Empire, instead receiving the associated, but separate and lower-ranking, British Empire Medal (BEM).

Major's review was carried out in conjunction with Sir Robin Butler, the Head of the Home Civil Service, from 1992. It focused on the civilian honours and reported in March 1993. Major made a recommendation that a similar review be completed into military awards with a view to making them "rankless". The Ministry of Defence started a joint services (army, navy and air force) review in March 1993. This reported later that year; on 17 October, Secretary of State for Defence Malcolm Rifkind announced that the distinction between officers and other ranks in the issuing of gallantry awards would be abolished.

== Civil honours ==
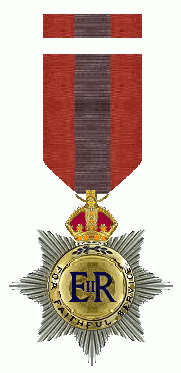
The Imperial Service Order, as worn by men

Major's review led to several significant changes in honours awarded. It concluded that honours should be awarded only for merit, exceptional achievement or exceptional service and ordered the end of automatic awards to those holding particular posts in the public or private sector. Under this order, for example, the automatic appointment of the Lord Mayor of London as a knight or dame grand cross of the Order of the British Empire ceased. Major permitted only one exception: High Court judges continued to be appointed knights bachelor or dames commander of the Order of the British Empire upon appointment. Major's review abolished the practice that the level of the honour awarded was in line with an individual's social or professional status; henceforth the level of honour awarded should be in line with the level of achievement and merit displayed.

Major also abolished the rank requirement for military personnel to receive appointments to the Order of the British Empire. The requirements were retained by some Commonwealth realms which use the British honours system, though the number of such awards is proportionally very low. Major considered that the link between the BEM and the order had become "increasingly tenuous" and halted the issue of the medal. Candidates who would have previously been recommended for the BEM would receive appointments as members or officers of the Order of the British Empire instead. Existing holders of the BEM were unaffected and Major increased the number of MBE appointments to make up for the abolition of the medal. Recipients of the BEM, unlike those of the order, did not receive an investiture from a member of the royal family. To accommodate the increased number of appointments to the order Elizabeth II agreed to increase the number of investiture ceremonies held each year. Appointees were also given the option of attending a ceremony locally, presided over by their Lord-Lieutenant. Hugo Vickers, writing in 1994, was critical of the abolition of the BEM as he considered it would reduce the number of honours available to members of the armed forces.

Major ended appointments to the Imperial Service Order (ISO), which had a low public profile and was awarded mainly to middle and upper-ranking civil servants. Candidates who would previously have been recommended for this order would instead be nominated to appointment as officers of the Order of the British Empire. The associated Imperial Service Medal, historically awarded only to working-class civil servants, was retained as a long service award for all civil servants. Such measures reflected the recent removal of the distinction between blue- and white-collar roles in the civil service.

Major decided that the honours system should allow for more candidates from the voluntary sector and be more diverse. He considered that minorities were under-represented on the honours lists, which were drawn up by government departments. Major hoped to rebalance them by introducing direct nomination by members of the public. He did not propose to change the practice of political nominations, which led to criticism in the House of Commons from the leaders of the Labour and Liberal Democrat parties.

Under the old system numbers of awards were determined every five years. Major brought forward the next review to summer 1993 and requested that it consider increasing awards for the voluntary sector and the general public and adjust the proportion of awards made to civil servants, diplomats and military personnel to reflect their changed role and size in recent years. Major intended that the majority of appointments now made should be as members of the Order of the British Empire.

=== Effects and later changes ===
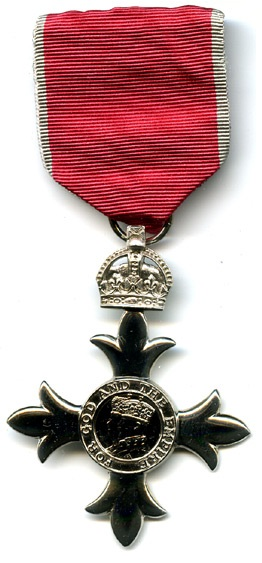
A civilian MBE medal

The first effects of the reform were made in time for the 1993 Birthday Honours. Major's reforms successfully increased the number and proportion of candidates from community, voluntary and local services who, by 2000, formed a majority of appointments to the Order of the British Empire. The nomination system implemented by Major remains the basis for the modern system, a mix of nominations made by government departments, public bodies and the general public. Historian Tobias Harper, writing in 2020, considered Major's reforms the most significant change to the honours system since the 1920s.

The withdrawal of the BEM was criticised by some deputy lieutenants as disenfranchising part of the community, who might not be eligible for higher honours. Nominations for the civilian medal were resumed by prime minister David Cameron in 2011, though the rank distinction for military awards was not re-introduced and military awards of the BEM were not resumed.

Major did not initially change the general policy of not honouring pop and rock musicians (honours for cultural achievement were much more likely to go to ballerinas, composers and high-brow writers). Neil and Tim Finn of Crowded House were made OBE in the 1993 Birthday Honours, but this was still described as "surreal" in Q magazine. After Tony Blair became Labour leader, a number of pop and rock musicians were honoured in 1995 and 1996. This included Cliff Richard who was knighted in the 1995 Birthday Honours, though his citation noted it was for "services to music and charitable service", rather than his music work alone. When Paul McCartney was knighted in the 1997 New Year Honours it was solely for "services to music". McCartney's knighthood was dismissed as "sentimental populism" by The Guardian in an editorial which suggested that "the real test of daring would have been to award gongs to Oasis".

After the change of government in 1997, which brought into power people much more attuned to pop and rock music, the numbers of people from these fields being honoured steadily increased and, although no members of Oasis have yet been honoured, this trend has accelerated over time, with MBEs eventually being given to grime pioneers Wiley and Dizzee Rascal.

A review of Major's reforms to civil honours was made by Cabinet Secretary Richard Wilson in 2000. Wilson found that the reforms had been successful in increasing the proportion of nominations made by the general public from 28% in 1994 to 45% and the proportion awarded for work in the voluntary sector from around a third to more than half. Wilson recorded that the proportion of honours awarded to state servants fell from around 20% in 1992 to 15% in 2000. Wilson did find that the nomination process remained obscure and recommended that the membership of the committees that drew up the honours lists be made public; this change was implemented in 2004. Major's reforms saw the proportion of MBEs increase from around 30-50% to at least 65% of the total honours awarded within the Order of the British Empire by 1998.

In 2003-2004 two reports on honours were issued, one by the Public Administration Select Committee (PASC) and one by former senior civil servant Hayden Phillips. The PASC report criticised the titles of some orders for being confusing and carrying "connotations of social divisiveness". It recommended the renaming of the Order of the British Empire to the Order of British Excellence and the ending of appointments to the Order of the Bath and the Order of St Michael and St George and the phasing out of titles associated with honours. Phillips' report was less radical and contained a defence of the honours system in general, which remained highly popular among the general public. Phillips' report made three recommendations: that local networks be strengthened to encourage the award of honours to under-represented groups; that the committees that decided on honours be more transparent and to be chaired by people from outside the civil service and government; and that the proportion of awards to civil servants remain below 20% of the total. He also set a new principle for the awarding of honours in the Order of the British Empire: MBEs should recognise service at the local community level, OBEs for service at the county or regional level and CBEs for national service. Knighthoods would be reserved for those that made exceptional or sustained contributions that had a national significance.

The government decided to implement Phillips' recommendations over those of the PASC. Although the PASC's proposed changes were not made, Major has since come to support the PASC recommendations with regards renaming the Order of the British Empire and also supports the renaming of its grades as Member, Officer and Companion which would allow for the retention of the current abbreviations.

== Military awards ==
In the British military some awards are made for gallantry and others for meritorious service. British gallantry awards are divided into operational and non-operational awards, the latter being awarded for actions "not in the face of the enemy". In most cases there were separate gallantry awards for officers and those of other ranks. As early as the 1930s there had been calls for this practice to be abolished but no action was taken. The Ministry of Defence's 1993 review, which was implemented between 1993 and 1995, largely focused on these awards. It retained the basic structure of the awards, being divided into four tiers, but removed the rank distinctions.

=== Non-operational awards ===
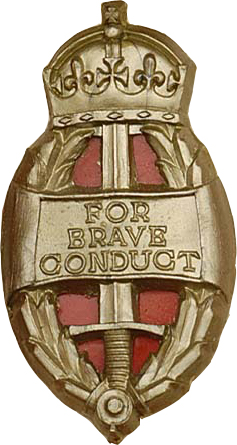
The badge of the King's (later Queen's) Commendation for Brave Conduct, abolished by the review

Awards of the Air Force Cross for meritorious service ceased, being replaced by the MBE or OBE. The medal became an award purely for gallantry not in the face of the enemy and was extended to all ranks. The Air Force Medal, previously awarded to other ranks for similar conduct, ceased to be awarded. The Queen's Commendation for Valuable Service in the Air, which had previously been used to recognise both meritorious conduct and gallantry, was replaced. Two new awards were introduced; the Queen's Commendation for Valuable Service recognised meritorious service by military personnel in any non-operational circumstance and the Queen's Commendation for Bravery in the Air was awarded for gallantry in the air. The Queen's Commendation for Brave Conduct, awarded to military and civilians for non-operational gallantry, was replaced with the Queen's Commendation for Bravery to match the new aerial gallantry award.

Changes in non-operational military awards
Level	Rank	Pre-reform award	Post-reform award
1	All ranks (and civilians)	George Cross	George Cross
2	All ranks (and civilians)	George Medal	George Medal
3	All ranks (and civilians)	Queen's Gallantry Medal	Queen's Gallantry Medal
3	Military officers	Air Force Cross	Air Force Cross
3	Military other ranks	Air Force Medal	Air Force Cross
4	All ranks (and civilians)	Queen's Commendation for Brave Conduct; Queen's Commendation for Valuable Service in the Air (when awarded for gallantry)	Queen's Commendation for Bravery; Queen's Commendation for Bravery in the Air

=== Operational awards ===
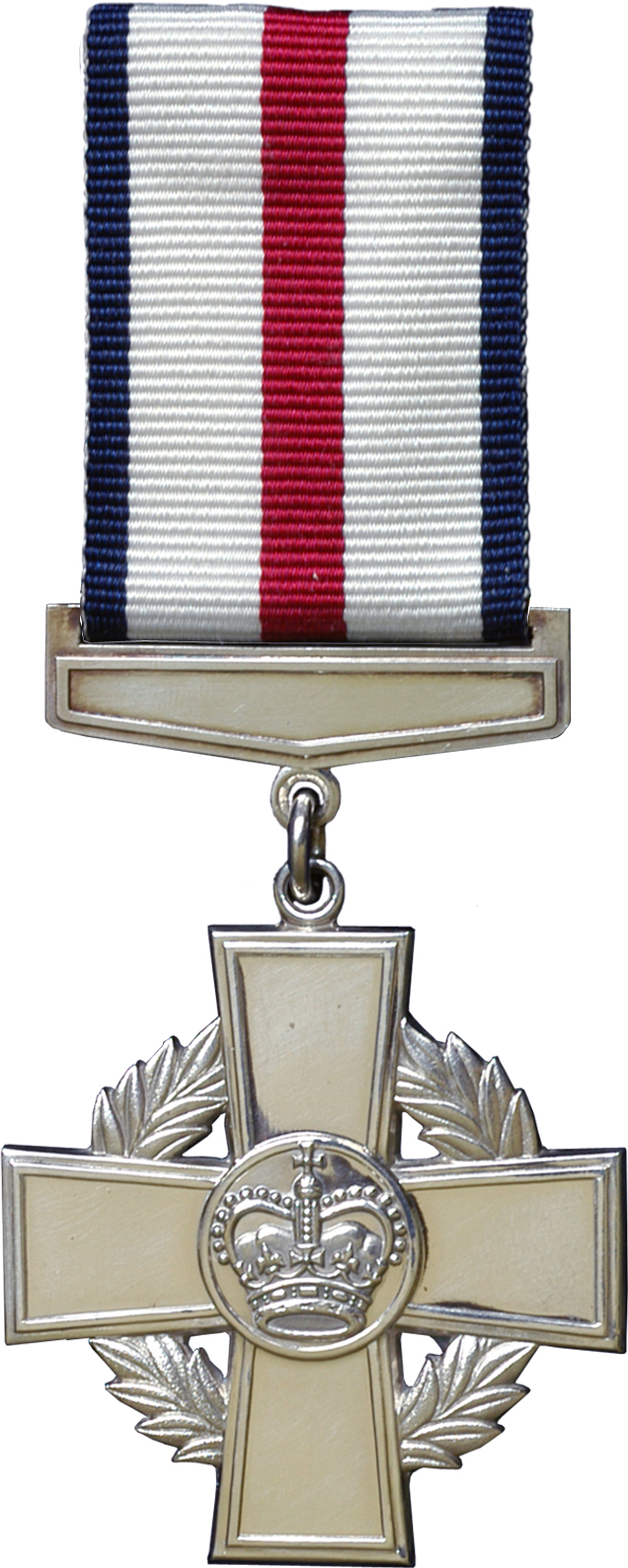
The Conspicuous Gallantry Cross introduced by the review

The top-level gallantry award, the Victoria Cross, which was the only pre-1993 gallantry medal to be awarded to all ranks, was retained unchanged. A new medal, the Conspicuous Gallantry Cross, was introduced as the second-tier gallantry award for all ranks. It replaced the Distinguished Service Order (DSO) for officers, when awarded for gallantry, and the Distinguished Conduct Medal (army), Conspicuous Gallantry Medal (navy) and the Conspicuous Gallantry Medal (Flying) (air force) for other ranks. The DSO continues to be awarded for leadership in combat but is now open to all ranks. The third-level awards retained the distinction between services, with the formerly officers-only Military Cross (army), Distinguished Service Cross (navy) and Distinguished Flying Cross (air force) being opened to all ranks. The Military Medal (army), Distinguished Service Medal (navy) and Distinguished Flying Medal (air force) previously awarded to other ranks ceased to be awarded. The Mention in Despatches commendation was retained as the fourth-level award but would only be awarded for gallantry, having previously been also awarded for meritorious service. A proposal to implement a specific medal for a Mention in Despatches, rather than merely awarding an oak leaf device to be worn on a campaign medal, was not progressed, but the oak leaf was changed from bronze to silver.

Changes in operational military awards
Level	Rank	Pre-reform award	Post-reform award
1	All ranks	Victoria Cross	Victoria Cross
2	Officers	Distinguished Service Order (when awarded for gallantry)	Conspicuous Gallantry Cross
2	Other ranks	Distinguished Conduct Medal (army); Conspicuous Gallantry Medal (navy); Conspicuous Gallantry Medal (Flying) (air force)	Conspicuous Gallantry Cross
3	Officers	Military Cross (army); Distinguished Service Cross (navy); Distinguished Flying Cross (air force)	Military Cross (army); Distinguished Service Cross (navy); Distinguished Flying Cross (air force)
3	Other ranks	Military Medal (army); Distinguished Service Medal (navy); Distinguished Flying Medal (air force)	Military Cross (army); Distinguished Service Cross (navy); Distinguished Flying Cross (air force)
4	All ranks	Mention in Despatches	Mention in Despatches
