= List of military veterans in British politics =

This is a list of currently serving members of the House of Commons, House of Lords, Scottish Parliament, Senedd (Welsh Parliament), Northern Ireland Assembly, European Parliament and Police and Crime Commissioners who have served in the Armed Forces as regulars or reservists.

== House of Commons ==
Name	Constituency	Party	Service and branch	Years	Rank	Notes
Dan Jarvis	Barnsley North	Labour	Parachute Regiment (1997–2011)	14	Major	Appointed a Member of the Order of the British Empire (MBE) in 2011
Alistair Carns	Birmingham Selly Oak	Labour	Corps of Royal Marines (1999–2024); Royal Marines Reserve (2024–present)	25	Colonel	Received a Mention in Dispatches in 2007, decorated with the Military Cross (MC) in 2011, appointed an Officer of the Order of the British Empire (OBE) in 2022 and a Companion of the Distinguished Service Order (DSO) in 2025
Sir James Cleverly	Braintree	Conservative	Royal Regiment of Artillery (1991–present)	33	Lieutenant Colonel	Decorated with the Territorial Decoration (TD) in 2012
Jamie Stone	Caithness, Sutherland and Easter Ross	Liberal Democrats	Territorial Army		Private	
Sir Iain Duncan Smith	Chingford and Woodford Green	Conservative	Scots Guards (1975–1981)	6	Lieutenant	
Chris Coghlan	Dorking and Horley	Liberal Democrats	Army Reserves (2017–present)	5	Captain	
Mike Tapp	Dover and Deal	Labour	Intelligence Corps (2007–2012)	5		
Helen Maguire	Epsom and Ewell	Liberal Democrats	Royal Military Police (2002–2005)	3	Captain	
David Reed	Exmouth and Exeter East	Conservative	Corps of Royal Marines; Special Forces Support Group			
Sir Edward Leigh	Gainsborough	Conservative	Honourable Artillery Company		Trooper	
Sir David Davis	Goole and Pocklington	Conservative	21 Special Air Service Regiment (Artists) (Reserve) (1966–1967)	1	Private	
Alex Ballinger	Halesowen	Labour	Corps of Royal Marines (2005–2013)	5	Captain	
Helena Dollimore	Hastings and Rye	Labour	Army Reserves			
Richard Foord	Honiton and Sidmouth	Liberal Democrats	Adjutant General's Corps (2004–2010)	6	Major	
Ben Obese-Jecty	Huntingdon	Conservative	Royal Yorkshire Regiment (14th/15th, 19th and 33rd/76th Foot) (2004–2012)	8	Captain	
Angus MacDonald	Inverness, Skye and West Ross-shire	Liberal Democrats	Queen's Own Highlanders (Seaforth and Camerons)			
Calvin Bailey	Leyton and Wanstead	Labour	No. 903 Expeditionary Air Wing; No. LXX (70) Squadron Royal Air Force (2001–2024)	23	Wing Commander	Appointed a Member of the Order of the British Empire (MBE) in 2015
Sir Julian Lewis	New Forest East	Conservative	Royal Naval Reserve (1979–1982)	3	Seaman	
Sir Desmond Swayne	New Forest West	Conservative	Queen's Own Mercian Yeomanry; Royal Mercian and Lancastrian Yeomanry; Army Reserve (1987–present)	37	Major	Decorated with the Territorial Decoration (TD) in 2000
Ian Roome	North Devon	Liberal Democrats	Royal Air Force (1986–1992)	6		
Steve Barclay	North East Cambridgeshire	Conservative	Royal Regiment of Fusiliers (1991)		Second Lieutenant	
Louise Sandher-Jones	North East Derbyshire	Labour	Intelligence Corps (2013–2020)	6		
Clive Lewis	Norwich South	Labour	Territorial Army (2006–2009)	3	Captain	
Fred Thomas	Plymouth Moor View	Labour	Corps of Royal Marines (2016–2023)	7	Captain	
Mark Francois	Rayleigh and Wickford	Conservative	Royal Anglian Regiment (1985–1991)	6	Lieutenant	
Neil Shastri-Hurst	Solihull West and Shirley	Conservative	Royal Army Medical Corps (2006–2014)	7	Major	
Bayo Alaba	Southend East and Rochford	Labour	Parachute Regiment			
Paul Foster	South Ribble	Labour	Royal Engineers	15		
Stuart Anderson	South Shropshire	Conservative	Royal Green Jackets (1993–2001)	8		
Andrew Murrison	South West Wiltshire	Conservative	Royal Navy; Royal Naval Reserve (1989–present)	35	Surgeon Commander	
Lincoln Jopp	Spelthorne	Conservative	Scots Guards (1990–2011)	21	Colonel	Decorated with the Military Cross (MC) in 1999 and received the Queen's Commendation for Valuable Service in 2011
Jim Shannon	Strangford	DUP	Ulster Defence Regiment (1974–1977); Royal Artillery (1977–1989)	15	Lance Bombardier	
Jenny Riddell-Carpenter	Suffolk Coastal	Labour	Territorial Army (2005–2009)	4		
Sir Andrew Mitchell	Sutton Coldfield	Conservative	Royal Tank Regiment	2	Second Lieutenant (on probation)	
Will Stone	Swindon North	Labour	The Rifles (2012–2017)	5	Rifleman	
Cameron Thomas	Tewkesbury	Liberal Democrats	Royal Air Force Police (2000–2023	25	Flight Lieutenant	
Tom Tugendhat	Tonbridge	Conservative	Educational and Training Services Branch of the Adjutant General's Corps (2000–2013); Royal Naval Reserve (2022–presemt)	13	Lieutenant Colonel (Army); Lieutenant Commander(Royal Navy)	Appointed a Member of the Order of the British Empire (MBE) in 2010
Mike Martin	Tunbridge Wells	Liberal Democrats	Territorial Army		Captain	
Andrew Bowie	West Aberdeenshire and Kincardine	Conservative	Royal Navy (2007–2010); Royal Naval Reserve (2002–present)	3	Sub-Lieutenant	
Sir Alec Shelbrooke	Wetherby and Easingwold	Conservative	Royal Navy			

== House of Lords ==
Title	Party	Service and branch	Years	Rank	Notes
The Lord Baker of Dorking	Conservative	Royal Artillery		Lieutenant	
The Lord Barker of Battle	Conservative	Honourable Artillery Company (1989–1994)	5		
The Lord Bellingham	Conservative	Guards Division	1		
The Lord Benyon	Conservative	Royal Green Jackets (1980–1985)	4	Lieutenant	
The Lord Bradshaw	Liberal Democrats	(1957–1959)	2		
The Lord Burnett	Liberal Democrats	Corps of Royal Marines	7		
The Lord Craig of Radley	Crossbench	Royal Air Force (1951–1991)	40	Marshal of the Royal Air Force	Received the Queen's Commendation for Valuable Service in the Air in 1965, appointed an Officer of the Order of the British Empire (OBE) in 1967 and a Knight Grand Cross of the Order of the Bath (GCB) in 1984
The Lord Dannatt	Crossbench	British Army (1971–2009)	38	General	Decorated with the Military Cross (MC) in 1972 and appointed a Commander of the Order of the British Empire (CBE) in 1996, received the Queen's Commendation for Valuable Service in 1999 and appointed a Knight Grand Cross of the Order of the Bath (GCB) in 2009
The Baroness Davidson of Lundin Links	Conservative	32nd Signal Regiment (2003–2006)	3	Signaller	
The Lord de Mauley	Conservative	Royal Wessex Yeomanry (1976–2005)	29	Lieutenant Colonel	Decorated with the Territorial Decoration (TD) in 1988
The Lord Elliott of Ballinamallard	UUP	Ulster Defence Regiment; Royal Irish Regiment (1982–1999)	17		
The Lord Geidt	Crossbench	Scots Guards; Intelligence Corps (1982–1994)	12		
The Lord Green of Deddington	Crossbench	Royal Green Jackets	3		
The Lord Harlech	Conservative	London Guards (2019–present)	5	Lieutenant	
The Lord Harries of Pentregarth	Crossbench	Royal Corps of Signals (1955–1958)	3	Lieutenant	
The Lord Hart of Tenby	Conservative	Royal Gloucestershire Hussars	5		
The Lord Heseltine	Non-affiliated	Welsh Guards (1959)		Second Lieutenant	
The Lord Hintze	Conservative	Australian Army	3	Captain	
The Lord Hope of Craighead	Crossbench	Seaforth Highlanders (1957–1959)	2	Lieutenant	
The Lord Houghton of Richmond	Crossbench	Green Howards; British Army (1974–2016)	42	Field Marshal	Appointed a Commander of the Order of the British Empire (CBE) in 2000 and a Knight Grand Cross of the Order of the Bath (GCB) in 2011
The Lord Janvrin	Crossbench	Royal Navy (1964–1975)	11	Lieutenant	
The Lord King of Bridgwater	Conservative	Somerset Light Infantry (Prince Albert's); King's African Rifles		Lieutenant	
The Lord Lancaster of Kimbolton	Conservative	Corps of Royal Engineers; Army Reserve (1988–present)	36	Major General	Decorated with the Efficiency Decoration (TD) in 2002
The Lord Maginnis of Drumglass	Independent Ulster Unionist	Ulster Defence Regiment (1971–1981)	10	Major	
The Earl of Minto	Conservative	Scots Guards (1972-76)	4	Lieutenant	
The Lord Naseby	Conservative	Royal Air Force (1955–1957)	2	Pilot Officer	
The Lord Peach	Crossbench	Royal Air Force (1974–2022)	48	Air Chief Marshal	Received the Queen's Commendation for Valuable Service in the Air in 1990, appointed a Knight Commander of the Order of the Bath (KCB) in 2009, a Knight Grand Cross of the Order of the British Empire (GBE) in 2016 and a Knight Companion of the Order of the Garter (KG) in 2024
The Lord Richards of Herstmonceux	Crossbench	3rd Regiment Royal Horse Artillery; British Army (1971–2013)	42	Field Marshal	Received a Mention in Dispatches in 1993, appointed a Commander of the Order of the British Empire (CBE) in 2000, a Companion of the Distinguished Service Order (DSO) in 2001 and a Knight Grand Cross of the Order of the Bath (GCB) in 2011
The Lord Robathan	Conservative	Coldstream Guards; Special Air Service (1974–1989)	14	Major	
The Lord Soames of Fletching	Conservative	11th Hussars (Prince Albert's Own) Royal Hussars (Prince of Wales' Own); Regular Reserve (1967–1975)	8	Second Lieutenant	
The Lord Stirrup	Crossbench	Royal Air Force (1968–2011)	43	Marshal of the Royal Air Force	Decorated with the Air Force Cross (AFC) in 1983 and appointed a Knight Grand Cross of the Order of the Bath (GCB) in 2005 and a Knight Companion of the Order of the Garter (KG) in 2013
The Lord Swire	Conservative	Grenadier Guards (1980–1983)	3	Lieutenant	
The Lord Walker of Aldringham	Crossbench	Royal Anglian Regiment; British Army (1966–2006)	40	Field Marshal	Appointed a Commander of the Order of the British Empire (CBE) in 1985, received a Mention in Dispatches in 1987, appointed a Companion of the Order of St Michael and St George (CMG) in 1997 and a Knight Grand Cross of the Order of the Bath (GCB) in 1999
The Lord West of Spithead	Labour	Royal Navy (1965–2006)	41	Admiral	Decorated with the Distinguished Service Cross (DSC) in 1982 and appointed a Knight Grand Cross of the Order of the Bath (GCB) in 2004

== Police and Crime Commissioners ==
Name	Police area	Party	Service and branch	Years	Rank	Notes
Chris Nelson	Gloucestershire Constabulary	Conservative	Royal Regiment of Artillery		Colonel	
Philip Seccombe	Warwickshire Police	Conservative	Warwickshire Yeomanry (1977–2002)	25	Colonel	
Philip Wilkinson	Wiltshire Police	Conservative	Royal Regiment of Artillery (1969–1998)	29	Colonel	Appointed an Officer of the Order of the British Empire (OBE) in 1998

== Scottish Parliament ==
Name	Constituency	Party	Service and branch	Rank
Keith Brown	Clackmannanshire and Dunblane	SNP	Royal Marines (1980–1983)	Marine
Mark Griffin	Central Scotland	Labour	Territorial Army	Private
Paul Sweeney	Glasgow	Labour	32nd Signal Regiment; Royal Regiment of Scotland	

== Northern Ireland Assembly ==
Name	Constituency	Party	Service and branch	Years	Rank	Notes
Andy Allen	Belfast East	UUP	Royal Irish Regiment (2006–2012)	6	Ranger	
Paul Frew	North Antrim	DUP	Royal Irish Regiment	7		
John Stewart	East Antrim	UUP	North Irish Horse	17		
Steve Aiken	South Antrim	UUP	Royal Navy (1980–2010)	31	Commander	Appointed an Officer of the Order of the British Empire (OBE) in 2004
Doug Beattie	Upper Bann	UUP	Royal Irish Regiment (1982–present)	43	Captain	Received the Queen's Commendation for Bravery and decorated with the Military Cross (MC) in 2003

== Current and former Cabinet Ministers ==
This list includes all current and former Cabinet Ministers who are ex-servicepeople and are alive today.

Name	Party	Service and branch	Years	Rank	Cabinet Portfolios	Notes
The Lord Hart of Tenby	Conservative	Royal Gloucestershire Hussars			Secretary of State for Wales (2019–2022)	
Sir James Cleverly	Conservative	Royal Regiment of Artillery (1991–present)	33	Lieutenant Colonel	Foreign Secretary (2023–2024); Home Secretary (2022–2023); Education Secretary (2022)	Decorated with the Territorial Decoration (TD) in 2012
Sir Ben Wallace	Conservative	Scots Guards (1991–1998)	7	Captain	Defence Secretary (2019–2023)	Received a Mention in Dispatches in 1993
Steve Barclay	Conservative	Royal Regiment of Fusiliers (1991)		Second Lieutenant	Brexit Secretary (2018–2020); Chancellor of the Duchy of Lancaster (2021–2022); Health Secretary (2022–2023); Environment Secretary (2023–2024)	
Penny Mordaunt	Conservative	Royal Naval Reserve (2010–2019)	9	Acting Sub-Lieutenant	Defence Secretary (2019); Leader of the House of Commons and Lord President (2022–2024)	
Sir David Davis	Conservative	21 Special Air Service Regiment (Artists) (Reserve) (1966–1967)	1	Private	Brexit Secretary (2016–2018)	
Sir Iain Duncan Smith	Conservative	Scots Guards (1975–1981)	6	Lieutenant	Work and Pensions Secretary (2010–2016)	
The Lord Hurd of Westwell	Conservative	5th Regiment, Royal Horse Artillery		Lieutenant	Foreign Secretary (1989–1995); Home Secretary (1985–1989); Northern Ireland Secretary (1984–1985)	
The Lord Heseltine	Conservative	Welsh Guards (1959)		Second Lieutenant	Deputy Prime Minister (1995–1997); First Secretary of State (1995–1997); Trade Secretary & President of the Board of Trade (1992–1995); Environment Secretary (1979 –1983, 1990–1992); Defence Secretary (1983–1986)	
The Lord Fowler	Conservative	Essex Regiment		Second Lieutenant	Employment Secretary (1987–1990); Social Services Secretary (1981–1987); Transport Secretary (1979–1981)	
Stephen Dorrell	Conservative	Royal Air Force Volunteer Reserve (1971–1973)	2		Health Secretary (1995–1997); National Heritage Secretary (1994–1995)	Stood in the 2019 general election as a Liberal Democrat.
The Lord Baker of Dorking	Conservative	Royal Artillery		Lieutenant	Home Secretary (1990–1992); Chancellor of the Duchy of Lancaster (1989–1990); Education and Science Secretary (1986 –1989); Environment Secretary (1985–1986)	
The Lord King of Bridgwater	Conservative	Somerset Light Infantry		Second Lieutenant	Defence Secretary (1989–1992); Northern Ireland Secretary (1985 –1989); Employment Secretary (1983 –1985); Transport Secretary (1983); Environment Secretary (1983)	
The Lord Rodgers of Quarry Bank	Labour	King's Regiment (Liverpool)			Transport Secretary (1976–1979)	Liberal Democrat peer since 1988
Dan Jarvis	Labour	1st Battalion, Parachute Regiment		Major	Secretary of State for Defence (2026)	

== See also ==
- Royal Navy
- Royal Marines
- British Army
- Royal Air Force
- Defence Select Committee
