= Percy Collins =

Australian sailor (1905–1990)

Percy Alfred Collins (January 22, 1905 – 1990) was an Australian sailor. He appeared on an Australian postage stamp in 1995.

== Biography ==
Collins was born in Murwillumbah in 1905. He was William and Ellen Collins’ (née Foley) fourth child.

=== Royal Australian Navy ===
In 1927 Collins became a stoker for the Royal Australian Navy; in 1939 he was promoted to the rank of petty officer. In 1940 he was selected to be part of the HMAS Napier commissioning crew (this was the first of the Navy’s new “N” class destroyers).

Collins died in 1990.

== Awards and recognition ==
In 1941 during the Battle of Crete, his actions resulted in saving a ship. For this he received a Distinguished Service Medal. It was stated that he had “virtually kept the ship mobile,” enabling it to proceed to port.

In October 1945 he received a Bar to his D.S.M. for his "courage, endurance, and skill" while undertaking escort duties "under hazardous and trying conditions". He was one of only two RAN sailors to receive a D.S.M. and Bar.

The Australian War Memorial received his medals upon his death, along with his portrait which had been painted by Alfred Cook in 1956.
