= 1919 New Year Honours (MSM) =

This is a list of Meritorious Service Medals (MSM) awarded in the 1919 New Years Honours.

The 1919 New Year Honours were appointments by King George V to various orders and honours to reward and highlight good works by citizens of the British Empire. The appointments were published in The London Gazette and The Times in January 1919.

The recipients of honours are displayed here as they were styled before their new honour, and arranged by honour, with classes (Knight, Knight Grand Cross, etc.) and then divisions (Military, Civil, etc.) as appropriate.

== Recipients of the Meritorious Service Medal (MSM) ==
In recognition of valuable service rendered with the Forces in Egypt:

- Bashshawish Abdul Banman Mohammed El Amruei, Egyptian Army, 1st Battalion
- Sergeant J. H. Anderson, Corps of Military Police, Military Mounted Police (Drem)
- Staff Sergeant E. L. Ashbrook, Royal Army Medical Corps, 2nd London San. Corps (Tooting, London)
- Sergeant M. R. Bafter, New Zealand Force, Postal Corps
- Sapper A. J. Bagnall, Royal Engineers, 7th Field Sur. Company (Barking)
- Staff Sergeant W. J. F. Bailey, Indian Army, Indian Misc. List
- Pioneer G. R. Ball, Royal Engineers (Dolyhir)
- Private W. R. J. Balls, Norfolk Regiment, 2nd Battalion (Holt)
- Company Quartermaster Sergeant H. G. Banwell, Royal Engineers, Postal Service (Peckham)
- Quartermaster Sergeant C. Barber, Royal Army Medical Corps (Leeds)
- Battery Sergeant Major G. R. Barmes, Royal Field Artillery, 303rd Brigade (E. Huddersfield)
- Corporal O. J. Bartlett, Dorsetshire Regiment, 2nd Battalion (Fairford)
- Staff Sergeant Major F. Battson, Hussars, 14th Hussars (Bridgend)
- Quartermaster Sergeant A. R. Baxter, Royal Army Medical Corps (Shrewsbury)
- Private F. Beall, Leicestershire Regiment, 2nd Battalion (Leicester) Royal Irish Regiment
- Sapper L. W. Bearne, Royal Engineers, Volunteer Corps, S. Company (Newton Abbot)
- Sergeant R. J. Beisly, Royal Army Medical Corps (Cairo, Egypt)
- Corporal W. Berry, Royal Engineers (Halifax)
- Private H. Bloomer, Leicestershire Regiment, 1st Battalion (Burntree, Teplow) Hampshire Regiment
- Private G. A. Brockman, Lancers, 17th Lancers (Rotherhithe)
- Staff Sergeant D. Brodie, Royal Army Ordnance Corps (Abbey Wood)
- Corporal J. Brooks, Essex Regiment, 1st (G.) Battalion (Deptford)
- Staff Sergeant Major J. H. Brown, Labour Corps, Headquarters, 3rd Echelon (Balsall Heath)
- Staff Sergeant A. C. S. Browning, Labour Corps, G. Headquarters, 3rd Echelon (Salisbury)
- Private J. Bryce, Royal Army Veterinary Corps (Edinburgh)
- Private L. G. Bulpitt, Leicestershire Regiment, 8th Battalion (Blaudford)
- Sergeant W. E. Burnard, Royal Engineers, Postal Service (Shepherd's Bush, London)
- Corporal J. H. Burns, Labour Corps, 4th Cavalry Division Tran. (Birkenhead)
- Corporal Field Artillery Burridge, Labour Corps, General Headquarters (Norwich)
- Sergeant H. Butler, Corps of Military Police, Military Foot Police (Byde, Isle of Wight)
- Sub. Conductor R. J. Cashman, Royal Army Ordnance Corps (Bexley Heath)
- Quartermaster Sergeant R. Clarke, Royal Army Medical Corps (Aberfeldy)
- 2nd Corporal T. Cleary, Royal Engineers, 389th Advc. Park Company (Enniskillen)
- Corporal D. W. Cockburn, Labour Corps, HQ Desert Mounted Corps (Galashiels)
- Battery Sergeant Major A. W. Coggles, Royal Field Artillery (Newton-on-Ayr.)
- Staff Sergeant F. Cole, Labour Corps, 22nd L. of C. Sup. Company (London)
- Sergeant K. A. Cooper, Australian Imperial Force, Australian Veterinary Corps
- Staff Sergeant Major H. J. Cooper, Labour Corps, G. Headquarters, 3rd Echelon (E. London)
- Company Sergeant Major H. Copping, Essex Regiment, 1st (G.) (London)
- Staff Sergeant J. H. Costar, Australian Imperial Force, 14th Australian General Hospital
- Private W. H. Cowie, Corps of Military Police, Military Foot Police (Hanwell)
- Sergeant C. R. Cowper, Australian Imperial Force, 14th A.G.H
- Staff Sergeant W. Cox, Military Provost Staff Corps (Broadstairs)
- Sapper T. Cripps, Royal Engineers, 61st M. Air Sec. (Shepherd's Bush)
- Quartermaster Sergeant G. M. Cuneo, Australian Imperial Force, Anzac Mounted Division HQ
- Battery Quartermaster Sergeant R. Cunningham, Royal Field Artillery, General Headquarters (Bedford Park, London)
- Sergeant F. J. Dando, Royal Engineers (E. Keithley)
- Temp Staff Sergeant Major H. Darling, Labour Corps, Base Horse Transport Depot (Plymouth)
- Quartermaster Sergeant J. H. Davenport, Royal Engineers (Birmingham)
- Sergeant Major Instructor E. J. Davies, Royal Engineers (Whitehaven)
- Sergeant P. M. Davies, Royal Engineers (Liverpool)
- Sergeant E. A. Davis, British West Indies Regiment, 2nd Battalion (Kingston, Jamaica)
- Private G. W. Daymond, Labour Corps, 808th Army Education Corps (Camelford)
- Sergeant Major G. J. Debney, Royal Army Medical Corps (Toronto)
- Quartermaster Sergeant W. Derbyshire, Royal Army Medical Corps, 24th Stat. Hospital (St. Anne's-on-Sea)
- Sergeant G. F. A. Dix, Royal Engineers, Postal Service (Tufnell Park, London)
- Sergeant Major H. Dixon, Royal Army Medical Corps, 71st General Hospital (Northampton)
- Driver S. Donoghue, Labour Corps, 2nd Donkey Trans. Company (Ashton-under-Lyne)
- Company Sergeant Major R. Dunmall, Labour Corps, 475th Company, 10 D.T. (Orpington)
- Staff Sergeant Major G. R. Elliott, Labour Corps, 21st L. of C. Sup. Company (Speldhurst)
- Conductor H. W. Erswell, Indian Army, Indian Misc. List
- Sub Conductor J. T. Fannon, Indian Army, Indian Ordnance Department
- Corporal L. Freeborough, Royal Army Medical Corps, 68th General Hospital (Penge)
- Staff Sergeant Major W. R. Gallop, Lancers, 17th Lancers (Sevenoaks)
- Staff Sergeant A. A. Gloster, Labour Corps, General Headquarters (Walthamstow)
- Quartermaster Sergeant F. A. Graber, Royal Engineers (E. London)
- Sergeant W. Gray, Royal Engineers, Postal Service (Glasgow)
- Staff Sergeant Major W. N. Hall, Labour Corps, 900th H.T. Company (Rotherham)
- Private W. Hardie, Royal Army Ordnance Corps (Barking)
- Private R. Harrison, Royal Army Medical Corps (Birtley)
- Warrant Officer B. L. Hastie, Australian Imperial Force, 19th Infantry Battalion
- Staff Sergeant Major A.E. Hatton, Royal Army Service Corps 3rd Echelon (London)
- Staff Sergeant Major A. R. Hatton, Labour Corps, 3rd Echelon (London)
- Squadron Quartermaster Sergeant R. Hawes, Labour Corps, HQ (E. Shrewsbury)
- Company Sergeant Major J. Hazlehurst, Essex Regiment, 1st (G.) Battalion (Stoke-on-Trent)
- Sergeant C. H. Hill, Labour Corps, General Headquarters (Torquay)
- Sergeant T. D. Hill, Royal Army Medical Corps, 53rd D.S. Sec. (Cardiff)
- Staff Sergeant J. Hindle, Royal Army Medical Corps, 24th Stat. Hospital (Bolton)
- Sapper C. G. Hitchman, Royal Engineers (Tunbridge Wells)
- Mechanic Staff Sergeant F. Holman, Labour Corps, 644th M.T. Company (Salisbury)
- Farrier Staff Sergeant H. V. Hunt, Australian Imperial Force, HQA. M.D. Train
- Corporal E. R. Hutchinson, Royal Engineers, M L. of C. Signal Company (Liverpool)
- Conductor C. F. J. Hynes, Indian Army, Indian Ordnance Department
- Private F. G. Inglefield, Royal Army Ordnance Corps (Westminster)
- Sergeant J. M. M. Inglis, Royal Engineers, Postal Service (Liverpool)
- Private N. W. Irving, Labour Corps, 802nd Army Education Corps (Hither Green) Royal Army Service Corps
- Driver J. Roberts, Royal Engineers (Horsham)
- Company Sergeant Major W. C. Jones, Labour Corps, 520th Company, 60 D.T. (Camberwell)
- Staff Sergeant L. C. Kent, Australian Imperial Force, Australian Army Medical Corps Dental Services
- Squadron Quartermaster Sergeant L. J. Kent, Royal Army Ordnance Corps (Stoke Newington)
- Armament Staff Sergeant B. C. Kenzie, Royal Army Ordnance Corps (Leytonstone)
- Sergeant W. J. King, Irish Guards, 1st Battalion (Abbeyleix)
- Private G. Kirkby, Corps of Military Police, Military Mounted Police (Stamford Hill)
- Temp Mechanist Sergeant Major T. Lacy, Labour Corps, 347th Machine Gun Company (Wavertree)
- Private H. Lavender, Corps of Military Police, Military Foot Police (Bloxwich)
- Mechanic Staff Sergeant W. W. Lawson, Royal Engineers, T.F. (Pelcairn Green)
- Corporal J. Lees, Royal Engineers (Dublin)
- Sub Conductor F. G. Levings, Indian Army, Supply and Transport Corps
- Private J. W. Linthwaite, Corps of Military Police, Military Mounted Police (Nottingham)
- Squadron Quartermaster Sergeant B. S. Long, Labour Corps, 21st Company (Hungerford)
- Temp Sergeant Major P. C. Lyons, Royal Engineers (Dublin)
- Company Sergeant Major Instructor J. Marsden, Army Gymnastic Staff (St. Pancras)
- Sergeant C. Marsh, Royal Army Ordnance Corps (Queenstown)
- Sub Conductor F. Mathews, Indian Army, Supply and Transport Corps
- Private W. Matley, Yeomanry, Duke of Lancaster's Own (Longsight)
- Quartermaster Sergeant M. McKinley, Royal Engineers (Dewsbury)
- Private G. W. Middlemas, Labour Corps, Headquarters, 21st Army Corps (Gateshead)
- Superintendent Clerk D. Miller, Royal Engineers (Dublin)
- Farrier Corporal M. F. Milner, Labour Corps, 2nd Base H.T. Depot (Tunbridge Wells)
- Sergeant W. F. Morris, Royal Engineers (Reading)
- Company Sergeant Major H. Morse, Devonshire Regiment, 1st (G.) Battalion (Shaw
- Staff Sergeant B. A. Newton, Australian Imperial Force, 3rd A.G.H
- Private A. R. Oakes, Royal Lancaster Regiment (Nayland)
- Armament Staff Sergeant R. J. Oliver, Royal Army Ordnance Corps (Plymouth)
- Shawish Moseilhi Osman, Egyptian Army, Medical Corps
- Private F. G. Parkhouse, Labour Corps, E.S.O., Suez (Wembley)
- Sub Conductor A. Paul, Indian Army, Indian Field Posts
- Staff Sergeant S. G. Peters, Royal Army Ordnance Corps (Whitegate)
- Sergeant J. Pritchard, Labour Corps, 1032nd Area Emp. Company (Stockport)
- Quartermaster Sergeant T. J. Quinn, Royal Engineers (E. Winchester)
- Sergeant A. G. Reeve, Royal Engineers, 115th Railway Company (Manor Park)
- Quartermaster Sergeant W. Robertson, Royal Army Medical Corps (Nunhead, London)
- Staff Sergeant Major R. W. Robinson, Labour Corps, 19th Company (Stourbridge)
- Quartermaster Sergeant Field Artillery Robson, Royal Engineers (E. Folkestone)
- Staff Sergeant Major E. W. Russell, Labour Corps, HQ D.M. Col. (Lutterworth)
- Corporal H. Russell, Labour Corps, 21st Company (Peverell)
- Sergeant A. Rutherford, Seaforth Highlanders, 1st Battalion (Elgin)
- Private F. Saunders, Corps of Military Police, Military Mounted Police (High Wycombe)
- Corporal A. R. Savage, Royal Army Medical Corps, 66th Cas. Clg. Stn. (Dingle)
- Staff Sergeant P. Schofield, Royal Army Medical Corps, 67th San. Sec. (Milton Regis)
- Sergeant G. Scott, Labour Corps, A.D.S.T. (York)
- Company Sergeant Major C. Scudds, Royal Garrison Artillery, 103rd Company, Verdala, Malta)
- Company Quartermaster Sergeant F. Shearman, Royal Engineers, Postal Sec. (Stoke Newington)
- Staff Sergeant Major P. W. Shepherd, Labour Corps, Headquarters, 1st Echelon (Plymouth)
- Temp Sergeant Major J. Shrive, Royal Engineers (New Cross)
- Staff Sergeant W. Simpson, Labour Corps, 21st Company (Lochgelly)
- Private F. Slattery, Royal Army Ordnance Corps (Dover)
- Staff Quartermaster Sergeant Field Artillery Slaunders, Army Pay Corps (Alexandria)
- Sergeant G. H. B. Sleight, New Zealand Force, New Zealand Medical Corps
- Private E. C. Stamp, Royal Army Medical Corps (Hornsey, London)
- Private J. C. Talbot, Royal Army Medical Corps, D.D.M.S 21st Army Corps (Snoracliffe)
- Battery Quartermaster Sergeant C. H. Tatum, Royal Field Artillery, 60th London Divisional Artillery Column (Kensington, London)
- Corporal C. J. Thornton, Essex Regiment, 1st (G.) Battalion (Wells)
- Sergeant A. Tully, Indian Army, Indian Unattd. List (13th Hussars)
- Staff Sergeant Major C. Webb, Labour Corps, Base Motor Transport Depot (E. London)
- Staff Sergeant J. Whale, Military Provost Staff Corps (Stockport)
- Quartermaster Sergeant W. R. White, Royal Engineers (Plymouth)
- Sergeant C. L. Windeatt, Labour Corps, 806th Army Education Corps (Weston-super-Mare)
- Company Quartermaster Sergeant J. A. Withers, Royal Engineers, R.O.D. (Stamport)
- Private A. Woodhall, Royal Army Veterinary Corps, 3rd Camel Veterinary Hospital (Woodlesford)

In recognition of valuable services rendered with the British Forces in Italy:

- Chief Mechanic J. B. Abbott (Chiswick, London)
- Sergeant Clerk D. C. Adams (Perth)
- Chief Mechanic E. A. Adams (Queens Park, London)
- Sergeant Major F. A. Adams (Stockport)
- Acting Master Clerk H. C. Adams (Kingewear, S. Devon)
- Air Mechanic, 1st Class J. W. Adamson (S. Shields)
- Air Mechanic, 1st Class C. J. Aiano (Forest Gate, London)
- Chief Master Mechanic E. A. Allemand (Wandsworth)
- Corporal Clerk W. J. Annette (S. Bermondsey)
- Sergeant Mechanic W. S. Appleton (Colchester)
- Sergeant Mechanic T. B. Arlette (Lostwithiel)
- Acting Sergeant W. J. Asker (Holloway, London)
- Sergeant Major J. B. Barnard (Tottenham, London)
- Chief Mechanic E. B. Barnett (Kensington, London)
- Sergeant Mechanic E. Battell (Kingsland, London)
- Corporal E. A. Barber (5 Group, Dover)
- Sergeant Mechanic J. Barr (Barrhead, N.B.)
- Chief Mechanic E. Barritte (Stanley, Durham)
- Chief Master Mechanic M. J. Bell (Slough)
- Private P. M. Beveridge (Kirkliston)
- Sergeant J. A. S. Binstead (West Croydon)
- Chief Mechanic W. Bissett (Dundee)
- Sergeant Clerk R. W. Bool (Pimlico, London)
- Chief Master Mechanic E. A. Bradbury (Walthamstow, London)
- Chief Mechanic W. Bramble (W. Baling)
- Sergeant Mechanic H. V. Brown (Diss)
- Corporal Mechanic A. H. Burton (Derby)
- Acting Chief Mechanic W. S. Burville DSM (East Cliff)
- Chief Mechanic (E.) H. Cadman (Birmingham)
- Private J. D. Campbell (Glasgow)
- Sergeant J. E. Chalmers (Australian Flying Corps) (Egypt)
- Sergeant W. R. Charlton (S. Shields)
- Chief Mechanic Rx, J. Chedd (Plymouth)
- Corporal E. Claxton (Earith, Hunts.)
- Corporal Mechanic A. M. Colledge (Hatton Gdns., S.E.)
- Chief Master Mechanic E. E. Cleere (Catford, London)
- Sergeant Mechanic F. R. J. Cooper (Bethnal Green, London)
- Chief Master Mechanic A. J. Copplestone (Herne Hill, London)
- Corporal Mechanic W. Cowie (Edinburgh)
- Sergeant J. Craft (High Wycombe)
- Fitter Clerk J. Creek (Stockton-on-Tees)
- Sergeant Mechanic J. H. Crouch (Westcliffe-on-Sea)
- Chief Mechanic A. Cruddace (Ferryhill, Durham)
- Sergeant Clerk G. W. Dailey (Rickmansworth)
- Corporal Mechanic J. E. Dashwood (Great Yarmouth)
- Sergeant Mechanic E. H. Davey (Brighton)
- Chief Mechanic R. J. J. Davey (Pembroke Dock)
- Chief Master Mechanic D. Davies (Birmingham)
- Air Mechanic A. T. Dawson (Kennington)
- Sergeant Mechanic R. E. Deakin (Macclesfield)
- Acting Sergeant Major W. Denton (Luton)
- Chief Mechanic G. Dickenson (Ossett, Yorkshire)
- Sergeant Mechanic H. Downham (Chesterford)
- Corporal H. A. Dubberley (Chesham)
- Chief Mechanic J. W. Dunk (Wadhurst)
- Air Mechanic, 1st Class H. Dunn (Wednesbury)
- Sergeant A. E. Dunster (Camberwell)
- Sergeant Clerk F. W. Dutton (Bushey)
- Chief Mec1 E. T. Edmunds (Hereford)
- Clerk S. C. Elliott (Crouch End)
- Chief Mechanic T. W. Evans (Forest Gate, London)
- Air Mechanic, 1st Class S. E. Fiford (Southampton)
- Sergeant Mechanic E. C. Fitton (Rochdale)
- Acting Master Mechanic P. Fraser (Portare, N.B.)
- Private F. W. Friday (Brixton, S. W.)
- Corporal Mechanic C. H. Frost (Shepherds Bush)
- Sergeant E. Frudd (Melton Mowbray)
- Master Mechanic J. J. Gadd (St. Leonards)
- Chief Mechanic E. Gamblin (Surbiton)
- Air Mechanic, 1st Class H. J. Gibson (Heaton)
- Fitter Sergeant W. Gibson (Northern Russia)
- Sergeant Major G. Gilman (Lewisham, London)
- Chief Mechanic T. L. Gliddon (Kensal Rise, London)
- Clerk1 A. A. Goldsmith (Paddington, London)
- Chief Mechanic F. E. Gordon (Southend)
- Chief Mechanic C. E. Goeky (Stamford Hill, London)
- Acting Chief Master Mechanic G. R. Guinea (South Shields)
- Air Mechanic, 1st Class J. Griffiths (Edgbaston)
- Chief Master Mechanic S. J. Guthrie (Walthamstow, London)
- Acting Chief Master Mechanic H. P. Hansen (Egypt, 68th Squad.)
- Chief Master Mechanic R. Harding (Gosport)
- Sergeant J. Harkness (Birmingham)
- Sergeant C. J. Harman (Australian Flying Corps) (Egypt)
- Corporal D. T. Harper (Australian Flying Corps) (Egypt)
- Chief Mechanic F. Harris (Liverpool)
- Air Mechanic, 1st Class W. Harrison (Settle, Yorkshire)
- Chief Mechanic H. W. Hartwell (Uxbridge)
- Sergeant Clerk T. Harvey (Cooreclure, County Clare)
- Sergeant Mechanic R. C. Heathfield (Highgate, London)
- Sergeant Mechanic W. Helmsley (Ashby)
- Air Mechanic, 1st Class J. W. Hemming (Basingstoke)
- Clerk F. A. Hill (Harrow)
- Air Mechanic, 1st Class Warrant Officer Hickling (N.W. Area, Glasgow)
- Acting Corporal J. R. Higson (Northern Russia)
- Chief Mechanic G. Hodgson (Wharfedale)
- Chief Mechanic F. J. Hogberg (Marylebone)
- Master Mechanic H. S. Howard (Newmarket)
- Sergeant Clerk P. R. Hutchins (Poplar)
- Chief Mechanic H. Irving (Liscard)
- Master Clerk F. James (Barrow-on-Soar)
- Chief Master Mechanic C. Jarvis (Pewsey)
- Clerk R. H. Jeffs (Monmouth)
- Sergeant Clerk W. A. Jenkins (Pembroke Dock)
- Chief Mechanic G. W. Jenner (Fulham)
- Corporal C. P. Johnson (Shrewsbury)
- Air Mechanic, 1st Class A. A. Jones (Hackney, London)
- Sergeant Mechanic E. Jones (Sale)
- Sergeant Mechanic F. J. Jones (Margate)
- Corporal Clerk G. E. Keay (Leicester)
- Air Mechanic, 2nd Class J. Kelly (Greenock)
- Master Mechanic J. Kemp (Chingford)
- Chief Mechanic A. L. Kerry (Leadington, Oxon.)
- Sergeant Major W. Kilkenny (Bury)
- Corporal Mechanic E. G. Kirby (Leigh-on-Sea)
- Chief Master Mechanic J. Laithwaite (Southport)
- Chief Mechanic P. Lashbrook (Paddington)
- Sergeant Major C. H. Lawrence (East Ham)
- Chief Master Mechanic G. Leach (Rugby)
- Corporal P. A. Lester (Brockley, London)
- Chief Mechanic J. N. Leigh (Bolton)
- Sergeant J. Littlewood (Leeds)
- Chief Mechanic W. Lodge (Brighton)
- Sergeant Mechanic F. Lovelace (Henstridge, Som.)
- Sergeant Mechanic P. J. Lovell (Okehampton)
- Air Mechanic, 1st Class L. H. Lowe (Walsall)
- Sergeant Mechanic J. McArthur (Buckhaven)
- Clerk 1 E. McCabe (Liverpool)
- Sergeant Clerk D. Mackinnon (Isle of Skye)
- Chief Master Mechanic J. McPherson (Edinburgh)
- Chief Master Mechanic H. MacQueen (Leicester)
- Chief Mechanic R. F. Manders (Leyton)
- Sergeant Clerk R. J. Marfleet (Birmingham)
- Chief Master Mechanic S. G. Marsh (Mangerton, Dorset)
- Chief Master Mechanic D. Martin MM (Shrewton)
- Sergeant Clerk W. E. Mason (East Ham)
- Clerk W. Mendoza (Clapton, London)
- Sergeant Clerk A. Merrilees (Oxford)
- Sergeant Mechanic H. B. Midgley (Ossett)
- Corporal Mechanic D. D. Miller (Napier, New Zealand)
- Corporal Mechanic R. Moffat (Paisley)
- Air Mechanic, 1st Class M. Moncur (Edinburgh)
- Sergeant Major W. E. Moore (Bournemouth)
- Air Mechanic, 3rd Class W. Morton (Newcastle)
- Sergeant Clerk F. Mowbray (Newcastle upon Tyne)
- Corporal Mechanic D. Muckersie (Perth)
- Sergeant Clerk H. L. M. Mulchinock (Palmers Green)
- Chief Mechanic A. C. Murphy (Bow Green, Kent)
- Chief Master Mechanic J. New (Bloomsbury, London)
- Chief Mechanic S. H. Newton (Hull)
- Chief Mechanic A. A. Nicod (Wallsend)
- Chief Master Mechanic F. Norton (Lincoln)
- Chief Mechanic E. A. Ogburn (64th Naval Wing)
- Sergeant Mechanic J. L. Ostick (Leeds)
- Chief Mechanic C. Ostler (Holbeach)
- Air Mechanic, 1st Class H. W. Partridge (Gillingham)
- Sergeant W. E. Parkhurst (Newton Abbott)
- Chief Mechanic W. H. Parsons (Harrow)
- Sergeant Major C. H. Perrin (Portsmouth)
- Chief Mechanic R. W. Petch (Scarboro)
- Corporal L. C. Phillips (Northern Russia)
- Corporal Mechanic H. Phipps (Littlehampton)
- Chief Mechanic S. J. Petts (Wimbledon, London)
- Air Mechanic, 3rd Class S. Prince (Liverpool)
- Clerk G. H. Pulfer (Upper Holloway, London)
- Corporal Clerk D. D. Radcliffe (Ewell)
- Sergeant Oik. J. A. Raeburn (Glasgow)
- Corporal Mechanic E. F. Rainbert (Brixton, London)
- Sergeant Major L. N. Reader (Leyton)
- Chief Mechanic J. Redpath (Gilmerton)
- Corporal Clerk W. H. Reed (Wimbledon, London)
- Chief Master Mechanic W. E. Rhoades, A.M. (Blandford)
- Clerk A. E. Richardson (Norbiton)
- Air Mechanic, 1st Class R. Ripley (Newcastle upon Tyne)
- Sergeant A. Ritson (Portsmouth)
- Corporal Clerk E. C. Roberts (Hampstead)
- Chief Mechanic A. A. Robinson (Norton) M
- Clerk 1 E. C. Robson (West Hartlepool)
- Sergeant Mechanic D. M. Rose (Glasgow)
- Sergeant Major F. Rowden (Tiverton)
- Acting Corporal H. Rowe (Northern Russia)
- Chief Master Mechanic F. Schofield (Stalybridge)
- Chief Mechanic A. Seabrook (St. Albans)
- Chief Mechanic W. J. Sheppard (Northampton)
- Acting Sergeant F. Shipperbottom (Bolton)
- Sergeant Mechanic E. G. Simmons (Brighton)
- Corporal Mechanic G. Short. (Rugby)
- Chief Mechanic R. Simpson (Cheetham)
- Sergeant Mechanic T. W. Scaife (Pickering)
- Chief Mechanic D. M. Smith (Broughty Ferry)
- Chief Mechanic F. B. Smith (Barrow-on-Furness)
- Sergeant Mechanic W. E. Smith (Enfield Lock)
- Corporal Mechanic H. W. Smith (Stamford)
- Chief Master Mechanic P. Smyth (Galashiels)
- Chief Master Mechanic W. J. Southgate (Highgate, London)
- Sergeant C. H. Spry (Houghton-le-Spring)
- Corporal Mechanic J. Staffiere (Dunfermline)
- Corporal Mechanic F. Stansfield (Wakefield)
- Chief Mechanic C. D. Stephens (Birmingham)
- Sergeant Clk, R. C. Stevenson (Rochdale)
- Chief Master Mechanic A. E. Stone (Woolwich)
- Air Mechanic, 2nd Class H. W. Swire (Nelson, Lancaster)
- Air Mechanic, 1st Class T. B. Sykes (Luddendonfoot, Yorkshire)
- Chief Master Mechanic A. Taylor (France, 69th Squad.)
- Sergeant Mechanic A. A. Taylor (Notting Hill, London)
- Sergeant Clerk P. N. Taylor (Norwich)
- Chief Mechanic T. Thompson (London)
- Chief Master Mechanic E. J. Tobin (Oxford)
- Sergeant Clerk A. Topp (Farnham)
- Air Mechanic, 3rd Class J. Traquair (Coatbridge)
- Chief Master Mechanic W. G. Turner (Plumstead)
- Private J. S. Twyford (Camberweltt)
- Sergeant Clerk F. J. Udell (Ilford)
- Private F. T. Veale (Bristol)
- Chief Mechanic E. Walker (Southsea)
- Chief Mechanic J. A. Wallace (Kelso)
- Chief Mechanic G. A. Worboys (Barnet)
- Corporal H. J. Waters (Bow)
- Sergeant Mechanic C. E. Watkins (Victoria, London)
- Sergeant F. Weavers (Beccles)
- Chief Mechanic A. L. Weeks (Cricklewood, London)
- Corporal Mechanic G. H. Westcott (Westcliff-on-Sea)
- Clerk E. J. Westley (Hove)
- Air Mechanic, 1st Class E. A. C. Weston (London)
- Corporal F. G. Weymouth (Devonport)
- Acting Sergeant Major G. G. R. White (Bristol)
- Air Mechanic, 3rd Class F. J. White (Salisbury)
- Chief Master Mechanic J. Whittingham (Galgate)
- Chief Mechanic F. Williams (Swansea)
- Chief Mechanic R. R. Williams (Didsbury)
- Chief Mechanic G. T. Wilton (High Barnet, London)
- Air Mechanic, 1st Class W. H. Winchcombe (Swindon)
- Acting Corporal F. J. Wise (Watford)
- Sergeant Clerk A. R. Wood (Honor Oak Park)
- Corporal Mechanic J. T. Wood (Birmingham)
- Sergeant Clerk T. Woodcock (Nottingham)
- Chief Master Mechanic E. Woolaway (Berks.)
- Chief Mechanic T. S. Wootton (Hucknell)
- Chief Mechanic G. W. Wortley (Doncaster)

== See also ==
- 1919 New Year Honours - Full list of awards.
