= Conspicuous Gallantry Cross =

British military award

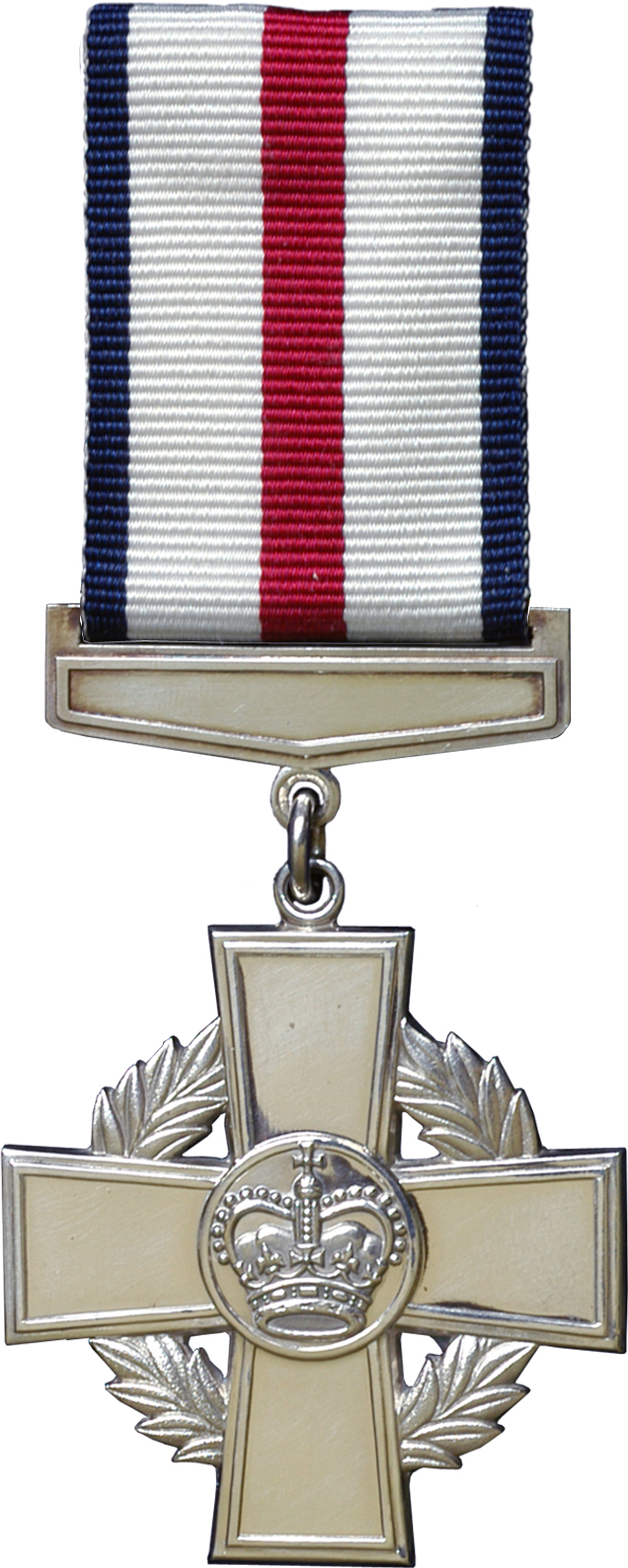
- Obverse of the medal. Ribbon: 32 mm, white with blue edges and a red central stripe
- Type: Military decoration
- Awarded for: ... an act or acts of conspicuous gallantry during active operations against the enemy.
- Description: 36 mm max. width; silver cross patée imposed on a wreath of laurel, with the Royal Crown in a circular panel in the centre. Suspended by a ring from a plain suspension bar.
- Country: United Kingdom of Great Britain and Northern Ireland
- Presented by: Monarch of the United Kingdom
- Eligibility: British and allied forces
- Status: active
- Established: October 1993
- First award: 1995

Highlights
- Total: 61 including one unit award
- Total awarded posthumously: 3
- CGC ribbon bar

Order of Wear
- Next (higher): Most Excellent Order of the British Empire (MBE)
- Next (lower): Distinguished Conduct Medal

The Conspicuous Gallantry Cross (CGC) is a second level military decoration of the British Armed Forces. Created in 1993 and first awarded in 1995, it was instituted after a review of the British honours system to remove distinctions of rank in the awarding of gallantry decorations. The Victoria Cross is the only higher combat gallantry award presented by the United Kingdom.

== History ==
The CGC was instituted in the aftermath of the 1993 review of the honours system. As part of the drive to remove distinctions of rank in awards for bravery, the CGC replaced both the Distinguished Conduct Medal (Army) and the Conspicuous Gallantry Medal (Naval and Air) as second level awards to other ranks and ratings. The CGC also replaced the Distinguished Service Order (DSO), in its role as an award to officers for gallantry. The DSO was retained as an award for outstanding leadership. The CGC now serves as the second level award for gallantry for all ranks across the whole armed forces. It was designed and sculpted by Michael Rizzello for the Royal Mint.

== Eligibility ==
The CGC, which may be awarded posthumously, is awarded "in recognition of an act or acts of conspicuous gallantry during active operations against the enemy". All ranks of the Royal Navy, Royal Marines, British Army, and Royal Air Force may be awarded the CGC in recognition of qualifying acts of gallantry. Bars are awarded to the CGC in recognition of the performance of further acts of gallantry meriting the award. When the ribbon bar alone is worn, a silver rosette on the ribbon indicates the award of a bar. Recipients are entitled to the postnominal letters CGC.

== Appearance ==
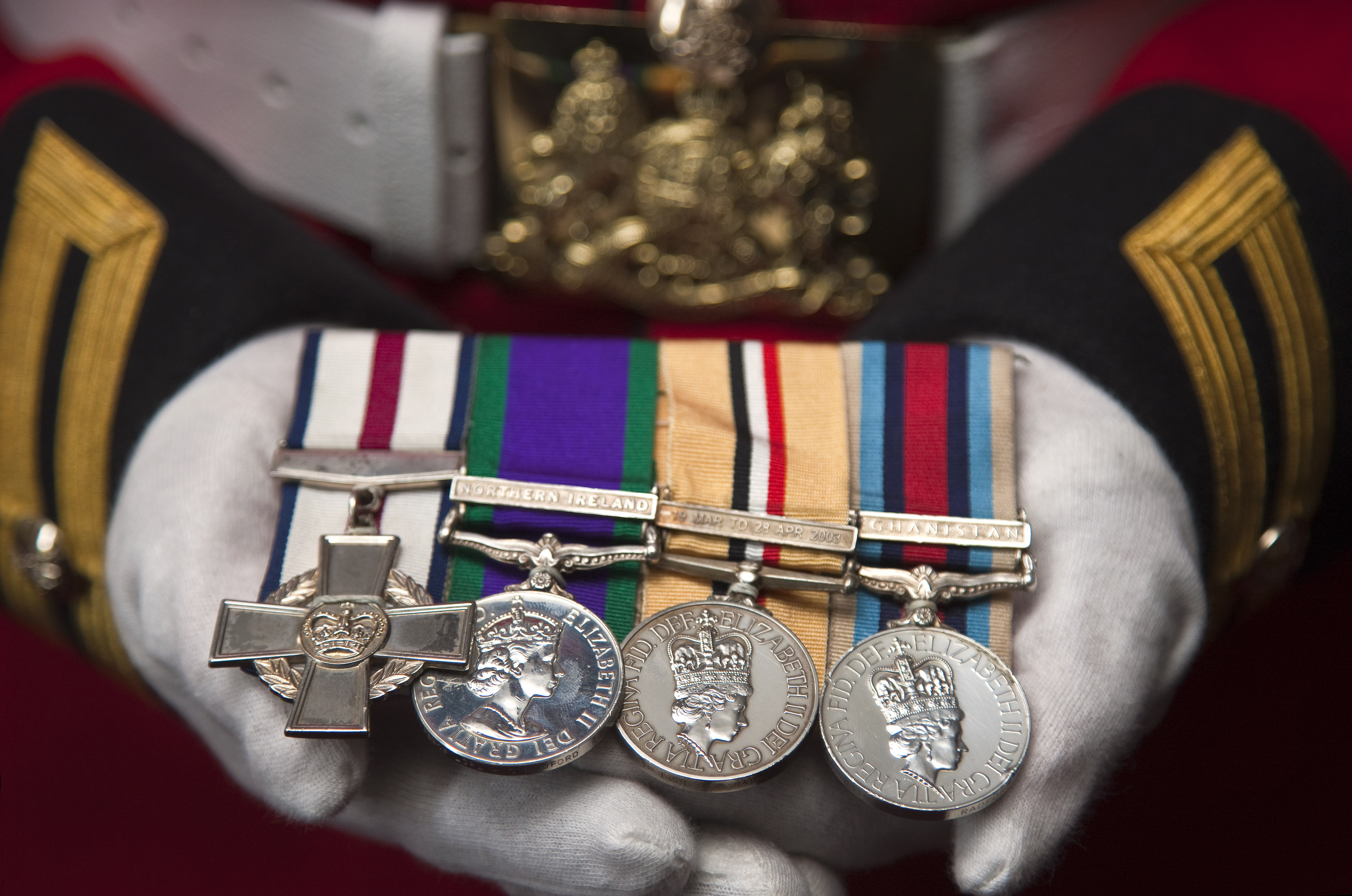
The CGC (left) as worn on a dress uniform with campaign medals. The medals shown are those awarded to Lance Corporal of Horse Andrew Radford, CGC.

The medal is in the shape of a cross pattée in silver. Arranged behind the cross, visible between the arms is a laurel wreath. On the obverse of the medal, the circular medallion in the centre depicts the St Edward's crown. The reverse is plain which allows room for the engraving of the rank, name, and unit of its recipient. The award date is also engraved on the reverse of the medal. The medal is suspended by a white ribbon with two narrow dark blue stripes at the edge and one centre stripe in crimson.

== Recipients ==
To date, there have been about 60 awards of the Conspicuous Gallantry Cross, including three posthumous and one unit award. No second award bars have been awarded.
The following is a full list of recipients who have been Gazetted to date.

Name	Rank	Service	Date award announced	Place
Mills, Wayne	Corporal	Duke of Wellington's Regiment (West Riding)	9 May 1995	Bosnia and Herzegovina
Humphreys, Peter	Colour Sergeant	Royal Welch Fusiliers	9 May 1996	Bosnia and Herzegovina
Baycroft, John David, MBE	Colour Sergeant	Parachute Regiment	6 April 2001	Sierra Leone (Operation Barras)
MacFarlane, Iain James McKechnie	Squadron Leader	Royal Air Force	6 April 2001	Sierra Leone (Operation Barras)
Day, Tony Kenneth	Corporal	Royal Marines	29 October 2002	Afghanistan
Merchant, Jeremy Mark	Captain	Royal Marines	29 October 2002	Afghanistan
Hearne, Karl Anthony	Corporal	Parachute Regiment	29 October 2002	Afghanistan
Sanders, Edward Lawrence	Private	Parachute Regiment	29 October 2002	Afghanistan
Thomas, Justin Royston	Marine	Royal Marines	31 October 2003	Iraq
Flynn, Michael John	Lance Corporal of Horse	Blues and Royals (Royal Horse Guards and 1st Dragoons)	31 October 2003	Iraq
Jardine, Shaun Garry	Corporal	King's Own Scottish Borderers	23 April 2004	Iraq
Robertson, Gordon	Sergeant	Parachute Regiment	23 April 2004	Iraq
Greensmith, Benjamin Paul	Corporal	Parachute Regiment	7 March 2008	Iraq
Broome, Christopher Mark	Sergeant	Princess of Wales's Royal Regiment (Queen's and Royal Hampshires)	18 March 2005	Iraq
Bryan, Terry	Sergeant	Royal Artillery	18 March 2005	Iraq
Thomson, Terence Alan	Corporal	Princess of Wales's Royal Regiment (Queen's and Royal Hampshires)	18 March 2005	Iraq
Tomlinson, Matthew Robert	Colour Sergeant	Royal Marines	24 March 2006	Iraq
Radford, Andrew	Lance Corporal of Horse	Life Guards	14 December 2006	Afghanistan
Collins, John	Corporal	Parachute Regiment	14 December 2006	Iraq
Harkess, James Royce	Colour Sergeant	Worcestershire and Sherwood Foresters Regiment (29th/45th Foot)	14 December 2006	Iraq
Farmer, Hugo	Lieutenant	Parachute Regiment	14 December 2006	Afghanistan
Illingworth, Timothy	Acting Captain	The Light Infantry	14 December 2006	Afghanistan
Unit award		Royal Irish Regiment/Ulster Defence Regiment	19 December 2006	Northern Ireland
Thompson, John Thomas	Corporal	Royal Marines	19 July 2007	Afghanistan
Hollingsworth, Jonathan Stuart, QGM	Sergeant	Parachute Regiment	19 July 2007	Iraq (posthumous)
Campbell, Donald Peter	Acting Corporal	Royal Engineers	7 March 2008	Afghanistan
Cupples, Simon Timothy	Lieutenant	Mercian Regiment	7 March 2008	Afghanistan
Willmott, Paul Darren	Private	Mercian Regiment	7 March 2008	Afghanistan
Miller, Adam William	Corporal	Royal Electrical and Mechanical Engineers	7 March 2008	Iraq
Wadsworth, James Anthony	Staff Sergeant	Royal Logistic Corps	7 March 2008	Iraq
McClurg, Robert William Kerr	Corporal	Royal Irish Regiment (27th (Inniskilling), 83rd, 87th and Ulster Defence Regiment)	6 March 2009	Afghanistan
Stevens, Alwyn John	Acting Sergeant	Royal Irish Regiment (27th (Inniskilling), 83rd, 87th and Ulster Defence Regiment)	6 March 2009	Afghanistan
Toge, Jone Bruce	Lance Corporal	Royal Irish Regiment (27th (Inniskilling), 83rd, 87th and Ulster Defence Regiment)	6 March 2009	Afghanistan
Durber, Leonard John	Colour Sergeant	Parachute Regiment	6 March 2009	Iraq
Malone, Bradley	Acting Corporal	Royal Marines	11 September 2009	Afghanistan
Nethery, Steven	Marine	Royal Marines	11 September 2009	Afghanistan
Dennis, Alan Gordon	Sergeant	Mercian Regiment	19 March 2010	Afghanistan
Gadsby, Stephen William	Gunner	Royal Artillery	19 March 2010	Afghanistan
Giles, Marc Kevin	Sergeant	Mercian Regiment	19 March 2010	Afghanistan
Moncho, Jaime	Sergeant	The Rifles	19 March 2010	Afghanistan
Prout, Gary	Lance Bombardier	Royal Artillery	19 March 2010	Afghanistan
Smith, Kyle Patrick	Lance Corporal	Mercian Regiment	19 March 2010	Afghanistan
Turner, Robert	Sergeant	Royal Marines	24 September 2010	Afghanistan
Bourne-Taylor, Robin Edwin Geoffrey	Captain	Life Guards	24 September 2010	Afghanistan
Brownson, Lee	Corporal	The Rifles	24 September 2010	Afghanistan (posthumous)
Horn, Graham Stuart	Lance Corporal	Parachute Regiment	24 September 2010	Afghanistan
McKie, James Lee	Lance Corporal	The Rifles	24 September 2010	Afghanistan
Pun, Dip Prasad	Acting Sergeant	Royal Gurkha Rifles	25 March 2011	Afghanistan
Jackson, Mark Anthony	Marine	Royal Marines	25 March 2011	Afghanistan
Stephens, Seth Vincent Scott	Corporal	Royal Marines	25 March 2011	Afghanistan (posthumous)
Cutterham, Deacon	Sergeant	The Rifles	23 March 2012	Afghanistan
Wright-Hider, Simon	Corporal	Royal Marines	23 March 2012	Afghanistan
Couzens, Scott Allan	Staff Sergeant	Parachute Regiment	28 September 2012	Afghanistan
Glancy, James Alexander	Captain	Royal Marines	22 March 2013	Afghanistan
Mason, Luke Timothy John	Lieutenant	Yorkshire Regiment (14th/15th, 19th and 33rd/76th Foot)	22 March 2013	Afghanistan
Davis, Owen Edward	Lieutenant	Royal Marines	4 October 2013	Afghanistan
Griffiths, Josh Edward Hayden	Corporal	Mercian Regiment	4 October 2013	Afghanistan
Steel, Gareth David	Private	Parachute Regiment	4 October 2013	Afghanistan
Stazicker, Anthony	Corporal	Special Boat Service	21 March 2014	Afghanistan
Moloney, Simon George	Lance Corporal	Blues and Royals (Royal Horse Guards and 1st Dragoons)	21 March 2014	Afghanistan
Craighead, Christian MBE	Warrant Officer Class 2	Special Air Service | Parachute Regiment (United Kingdom)	14 November 2019	Kenya

== See also ==
- Orders, decorations, and medals of the United Kingdom
