= British Empire Medal =

British civil and military medal

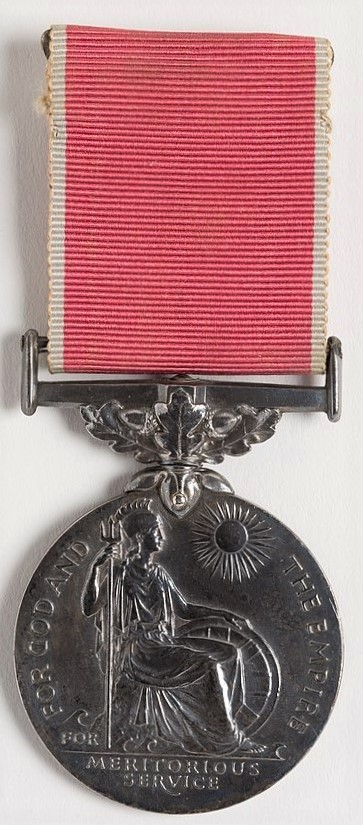
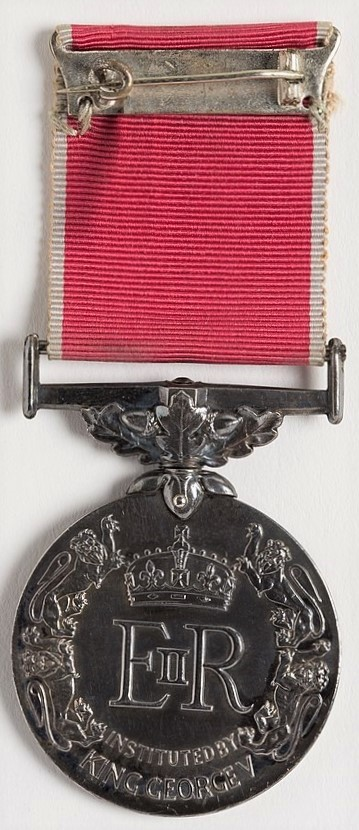
- Obverse (left) and reverse: British Empire Medal, civil division ribbon
- Type: Medal affiliated with an order
- Awarded for: Meritorious service
- Country: United Kingdom
- Presented by: Charles III
- Post-nominals: BEM
- Motto: For God and the Empire
- Status: Currently awarded
- Established: 1922–present 1993–2011 Commonwealth but not UK
- Final award: 2026 New Year Honours
- Ribbon bars: Civil and Military BEM (to 1937) Ribbon bars: Civil and Military BEM (since 1937)

Precedence
- Next (higher): Royal Victorian Medal
- Next (lower): King's Police Medal
- Related: Order of the British Empire

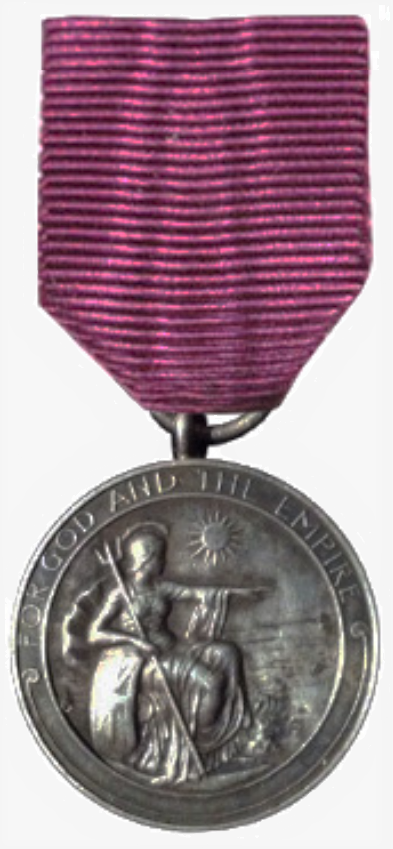
Medal of the Order of the British Empire, obverse. Awarded 1917–22.

The British Empire Medal (BEM; formerly British Empire Medal for Meritorious Service) is a British and Commonwealth award for meritorious civil or military service worthy of recognition by the Crown. The current honour was created in 1922 to replace the original medal, which had been established in 1917 as part of the Order of the British Empire.

== Award ==
The British Empire Medal is granted by the monarch of the United Kingdom in recognition of meritorious civil or military service. Recipients are entitled to use the post-nominal letters "BEM" with special privileges to use St Paul's Cathedral for funerals, baptisms and weddings. BEM holders can also apply for a coat of arms designed by the Monarch's artist.

Since December 1918, the honour has been divided into civil and military divisions in the same way as the Order of the British Empire. The medal was fully incorporated in the Order in 2012; previously, it was affiliated to the Order.

Between 1993 and 2012, the British Empire Medal was not awarded to citizens of the United Kingdom, although it continued to be awarded in some Commonwealth realms during that time. The practice of awarding the Medal to British citizens was resumed in June 2012, to coincide with the Diamond Jubilee of Elizabeth II.

Since March 1941, a clasp attached to the ribbon can be bestowed to denote a further award.

A holder of the BEM subsequently appointed to membership of the Order of the British Empire had been permitted to wear the insignia for both.

== History ==
=== 1917–1922 ===
The Medal of the Order of the British Empire was established in June 1917, along with the Order of the British Empire of which it was a part, and could be awarded for either meritorious service or for gallantry. It was awarded to 2,014 people, 800 of whom were from foreign countries.

=== 1922–1940 ===
In 1922, the original medal was discontinued, and was replaced by two separate honours, both of which still formed part of the Order of the British Empire. These two honours were known as the Medal of the Order of the British Empire for Meritorious Service (usually referred to as British Empire Medal, BEM) and the Medal of the Order of the British Empire for Gallantry (usually referred to as Empire Gallantry Medal, EGM). Of these medals, the EGM was awarded for acts of bravery, until it was replaced by the George Cross in 1940. The BEM was awarded in similar circumstances as the other Order of the British Empire medals. In the uniformed services, it was awarded to non-commissioned officers of the armed forces, officers below superintendent rank in the police,

=== 1940–1992 ===
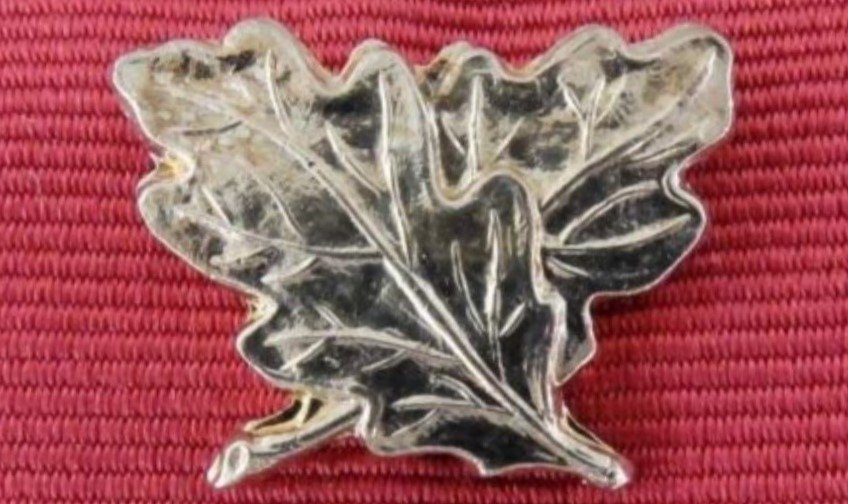
Silver oak-leaf emblem for gallantry, awarded 1958–74

On 24 September 1940, the George Cross was established, and the EGM was revoked by Royal Warrant the same day. All living recipients, other than honorary recipients, and the next-of-kin of those posthumously awarded the EGM after 3 September 1939, the start of the Second World War, were to exchange their insignia for the George Cross. Recipients of the BEM were not affected by these changes.

From 1940, the war led to an increasing number of BEMs awarded to service personnel and civilians, including the Merchant Navy, police and civil defence, for acts of gallantry that did not reach the standard of the George Medal (GM). Such awards often had citations, while awards for meritorious service usually did not.

From 14 January 1958, awards of the BEM for acts of gallantry were formally designated the British Empire Medal for Gallantry and consisted of the BEM with a silver oak leaf emblem worn on the ribbon. The first recipients of this newly designated award were two Board of Customs officers, George Elrick Thomson and John Rees Thomas, who ventured into a burning steamship hold in an attempt to rescue a colleague. Like the GM, the BEM for Gallantry could not be awarded posthumously and was eventually replaced in 1974 with the Queen's Gallantry Medal (QGM). Again, recipients of the BEM for services other than acts of bravery were not affected by these changes.

=== 1992–2012 ===
The BEM continued to be awarded to subjects of the United Kingdom until 1992. After a 1993 review of the British honours system, the government decided that the distinction between the BEM and MBE had "become increasingly tenuous" and the Prime Minister, John Major, ended the award of the BEM to British subjects, although the medal continued to be awarded in some Commonwealth realms, such as the Bahamas and the Cook Islands.

=== From 2012 ===
Following the 2011 Commonwealth Heads of Government Meeting, Prime Minister David Cameron announced that the BEM would once again be awarded in the United Kingdom; this would start beginning in 2012, to coincide with the Diamond Jubilee of Elizabeth II. "(In 2012) the Government reviewed the need for the British Empire Medal, and it was reinstated as part of the Honours system and part of the Order of the British Empire." In the 2012 Birthday Honours, released on 16 June 2012, the BEM was awarded to 293 people.

Although those awarded the honour do not receive it from the monarch in person, but from the Lord Lieutenant of their county, recipients are invited to a Buckingham Palace garden party to celebrate their achievement. Awards are announced in The Gazette.

=== Appearance ===
The Medal of the Order of the British Empire awarded from 1917 to 1922 is a circular silver medal, 30 millimetres (1.2 in) in diameter, showing a seated Britannia and the inscription "for God and the empire" on the obverse and the royal cypher on the reverse. It has a ring suspender for the 27-millimetre-wide (1.1 in) ribbon of plain purple, the military division having a red central stripe. The medal was awarded unnamed.

The medals introduced in 1922 broadly follow the same design but, with a diameter of 36 millimetres (1.4 in), are larger than the previous medal, and have either "for meritorious service" or "for gallantry" in the obverse exergue. It is presented with the recipient's name on the rim. The medal has a straight bar suspender for the 1.25-inch-wide (32 mm) ribbon. This was plain purple, with a red central stripe for the military division, until 1937 when, like the Order, the ribbon changed to the current design of rose-pink with pearl-grey edges, with an additional pearl-grey central stripe for the military division. Women may wear the medal from a ribbon tied in a bow.

== See also ==
- Category:Recipients of the British Empire Medal
