= James Glancy =

British television presenter and conservationist (born 1982)

James Glancy CGC
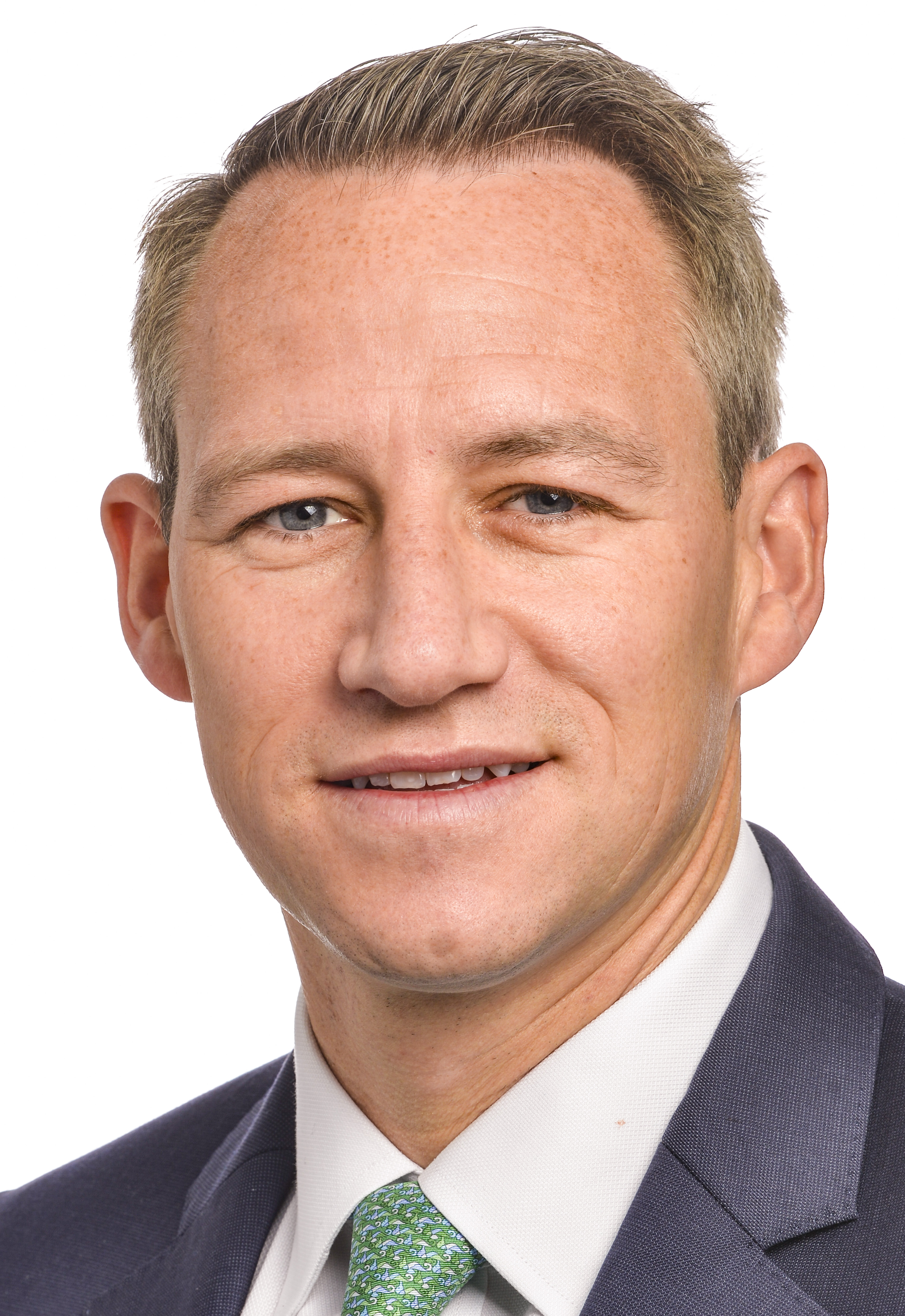
- Glancy in 2019

Member of the European Parliament for South West England
- In office 2 July 2019 – 31 January 2020
- Preceded by: The Earl of Dartmouth
- Succeeded by: Constituency abolished

Personal details
- Born: James Alexander Glancy; August 1982 (age 44) Surrey, England
- Party: Brexit (2019–2020)
- Other political affiliations: Conservative (before 2019)
- Education: St Anne's College, Oxford
- Occupation: Conservationist/Presenter
- Website: www.jamesglancy.com

Military service
- Allegiance: United Kingdom
- Branch/service: Royal Marines
- Years of service: 2001–2013
- Rank: Captain
- Unit: Special Boat Service
- Battles/wars: War in Afghanistan
- Awards: Conspicuous Gallantry Cross
- Occupation: Film maker
- Years active: 2018 – present
- Organization: Discovery Channel
- Known for: Conservation biology
- Notable work: Afghanistan; Sharkwrecked
- Style: Documentary film
- Awards: Conspicuous Gallantry Cross
- Website: jamesglancey.com

James Alexander Glancy, CGC (born August 1982) is a British television presenter, conservationist and former politician. He formerly served as a member of the Royal Marine Commandos and was a Brexit Party Member of the European Parliament (MEP) for South West England from 2019 to 2020.

== Early life and education ==
Glancy was born in Surrey in 1982. Glancy studied history at St Anne's College, Oxford. He was captain of the university's boxing team. He was sponsored through university by the Royal Marines.

== Military service ==
Glancy served in the Royal Marines and the Special Boat Service (SBS). In March 2013, the then Captain Glancy was awarded the Conspicuous Gallantry Cross (CGC) "in recognition of gallant and distinguished services in Afghanistan during the period 1 April 2012 to 30 September 2012". The CGC is a second level UK honour, with only the Victoria Cross ranking higher for combat gallantry. He completed three tours of Afghanistan.

== Filmmaking ==
Glancy presented the environmental show Planet SOS on the Mail Plus and hosts documentaries on National Geographic and the Discovery Channel, including Shark Week.

=== Afghanistan ===
Afghanistan is a documentary film produced by Featuristic Films, offering a detailed insight into the United States invasion of Afghanistan.

The documentary originally set out to capture Glancy's return to Afghanistan, reflecting on his experiences and pondering the worth of the U.S. invasion. However, during its production, U.S. President Joe Biden announced the withdrawal of American troops. This move triggered a swift offensive by the Taliban, culminating in the Afghan government's collapse.

The narrative combines Glancy's personal tales, stories from his father who mingled with the Mujahideen in the 1980s, and insights into the daily life and culture of Afghanistan. Filmed across six provinces, the documentary reveals secret interactions with Taliban members, frontline combat alongside Mujahideen and Afghan special forces, and the voices of a diverse set of Afghans—from female mountaineers to inhabitants of refugee camps, and direct confrontations with the Taliban.

Glancy expressed deep concern regarding the rapid Taliban takeover after the documentary's production, opining that their work might be among the last to capture the lives of Afghans during that era.

=== Sharkwrecked ===
Glancy co-starred in the Discovery Channel's Sharkwrecked. The show's producers wanted to set the show at the U.S.S. Indianapolis (CA-35) wreck site where one of the USA's worst documented shark attacks occurred. However, owing to the scarcity of oceanic whitetip sharks in that region, the location shifted to Cat Island in the Bahamas. The revised goal delivered a conservation message in a survival documentary-style format.

The special moved to Cat Island in The Bahamas, which is one of the whitetip's last habitats. Glancy collaborated with Paul de Gelder, an Australian military veteran who lost a hand and a leg to a shark in 2009. Both shared family ties to World War naval tragedies.

The duo braved 43 hours in open seas, facing threats from sharks, sheer exhaustion, dehydration, and hunger. They relied on life jackets during nighttime to prevent separation and used a netted barrier to deter sharks.

During their filming, an unexpected shift in ocean currents doubled their distance to the coast, prolonging potential medical rescue to approximately five hours. This situation was further complicated by sporadic storms in the vicinity.

Despite the risks, Glancy observed the oceanic whitetip shark's cautious nature and the dichotomy between the creature's reputation and his lived experience. The documentary emphasised the need for conservation, noting the severe decline in oceanic white-tip shark numbers due to overfishing.

== Filmography ==
Year	Title	Role	Notes
2021	World's Biggest Bullshark?	Camera Operator/Director/Producer	
2021	Great Hammerhead Stakeout	Presenter	
2023	Afghanistan	Camera Operator/Director/Producer	
2023	Squid Fleet	Additional Drone/Cinematography	Short
2023	Les oiseaux - Voyageurs du ciel	Photography	TV Series
2022	Deep Water Salvage	Camera Operator/Director/Producer	TV Series, Rated 7.7

== Political career ==
Glancy stood as a candidate in the 2019 European Parliament election for the Brexit Party. He was placed at number two on his party's list and was elected as one of its three MEPs in the South West England constituency alongside Ann Widdecombe and Christina Jordan.
