= Queen's Commendation for Brave Conduct =

King's Commendation for Brave Conduct (1939–52) Queen's Commendation for Brave Conduct (1952–94)
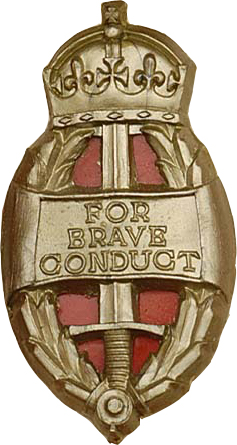
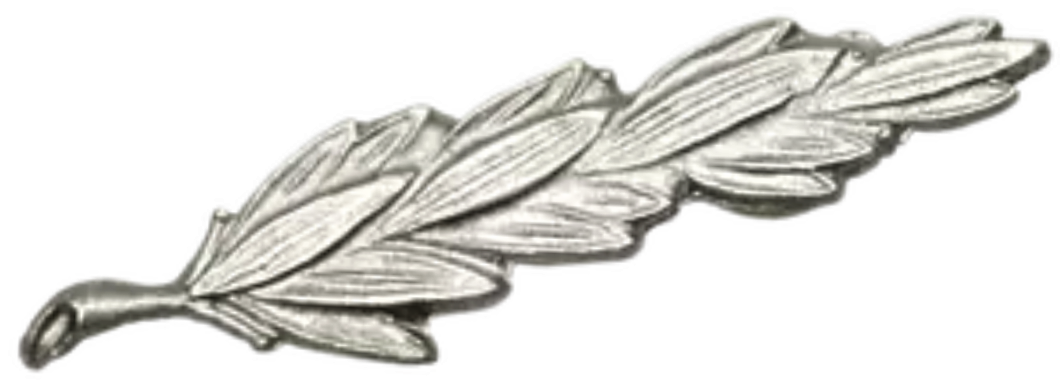
- 1943–45: Badge for civilian recipients From 1946: civil and military ribbon devices
- Type: Commendation
- Awarded for: Gallantry entailing risk to life and meriting national recognition
- Description: Certificate / Pin back badge / Ribbon device
- Presented by: United Kingdom and Commonwealth
- Eligibility: Both service personnel and civilians
- Status: Discontinued 1994. Replaced by Queen's Commendation for Bravery
- Established: 1939
- Final award: 1994

Precedence
- Next (higher): Queen's Gallantry Medal
- Equivalent: King's/Queen's Commendation for Valuable Service in the Air

The Queen's Commendation for Brave Conduct, formerly the King's Commendation for Brave Conduct, acknowledged brave acts by both civilians and members of the armed services in both war and peace, for gallantry not in the presence of an enemy. Established by King George VI in 1939, the award was discontinued in 1994 on the institution of the Queen's Commendation for Bravery.

It represented the lowest level of bravery award in the British honours system, alongside a mention in despatches. There is no entitlement to post-nominal letters.

== Institution ==
The Commendation for Brave Conduct was established in 1939 at the beginning of World War II. No Royal Warrant or other public statement was issued which specified the title, precedence and eligibility of the award, suggesting it was a prompt wartime solution to a gap in the awards available to reward gallantry by non-combatants, particularly those involved in Civil Defence and the Merchant Navy. Awards were published in the London Gazette, with most entries referring to a 'Commendation for brave conduct', or simply 'Commendation'. This was not formally described as the 'King's Commendation for Brave Conduct' until September 1945. Commendations could be made posthumously, enabling official recognition of bravery in all circumstances, since other gallantry awards, except for the Victoria Cross and the George Cross, could not be awarded posthumously.

After 1945, the King's Commendation for Brave Conduct continued to be the lowest level of bravery award in the British honours system, alongside a mention in despatches, in rewarding bravery by civilians and members of the armed forces in non-frontline circumstances, where the action did not merit the award of another award for gallantry.

== Evolution ==
During World War I it was recognised that there was no suitable reward for acts of bravery by civilians, such as the seamen of the British Mercantile Marine (later known as the Merchant Navy), which did not merit a specific gallantry medal. That led to the formal introduction of 'Commendations', a system reintroduced in 1939 by King George VI, later officially titled the 'King's Commendation for Brave Conduct'. Renamed the 'Queen's Commendation for Brave Conduct' in 1952, the award was discontinued in 1994, on the creation of the Queen's Commendation for Bravery.

- During World War I the 'Commendation' was uniquely awarded to the officers and men of the Mercantile Marine, and was the primary reward for gallantry by merchant seamen. While recipients appeared in the London Gazette and received a certificate, no award accompanied the commendation.
- The first list of awards for merchant seamen 'commended for good service' was published in the London Gazette on 22 December 1916, the recipients having been in action with U-boats or mines.
- The first posthumous award appeared in a list of 'Commendations' announced in the London Gazette on 15 May 1917, to Captain Peter MacLachlan of the steamship "Bellorado" who had been killed in a gun battle with U-boat UC-22 on 27–28 February 1917.
- The last Commendation awarded for service in World War I was announced in the London Gazette on 10 July 1919 to Able Seaman James Anderson of the steamship Petunia which had been torpedoed and sunk.
- Between the two World Wars the practice of awarding 'Commendations' fell into disuse.
- With the outbreak of World War II, a system of commendations was again established. The first awards were announced in the London Gazette on 15 December 1939, when names of officers and men of the Merchant Navy ships "Mopan", "Lochgoil" and "Goodwood" were published following 'an expression of commendation of their good services' in action with U-boats and mines.
- Multiple civilian awards appeared in the London Gazette on 30 September 1940 alongside awards of the recently instituted George Medal, the majority being firefighters. Many more followed in the lists of 'Commendations' on 4 October 1940 where the first awards to female recipients appeared, to Miss Elizabeth Connie Lyle an Air Raid Warden of Newhaven Edinburgh and Miss Violet Morgan a Nurse from Weymouth.
- The first posthumous awards appeared in the London Gazette on 8 October 1940, when three British Merchant Navy seamen were killed when the ocean liner Lancastria was bombed during the Dunkirk evacuation operations in June 1940, to Richard Garonwy Roberts, John Hill and James Duncan.
- The last awards of King's Commendations for Brave Conduct appeared in the London Gazette on 12 February 1952, six days after King George VI had died.
- The first award of the Queen's Commendation for Brave Conduct was announced in the London Gazette, on 14 March 1952.
- The award was effectively replaced by the Queen's Commendation for Bravery in August 1994.

== Description ==
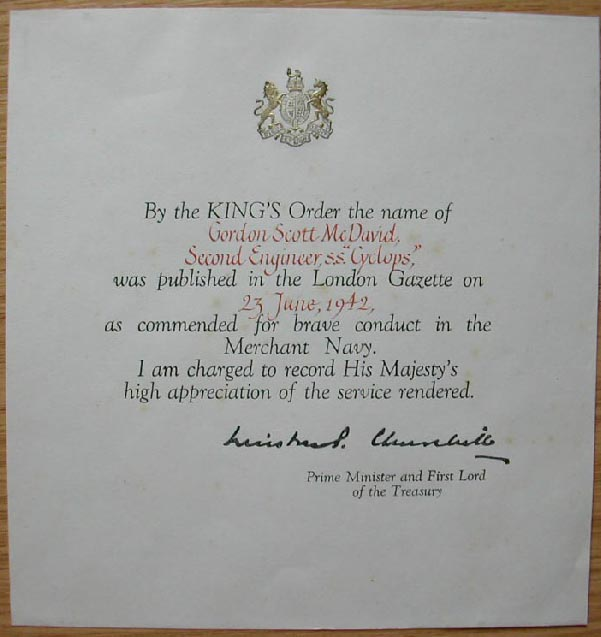
Certificate of a King's Commendation awarded posthumously to a merchant seaman in 1942

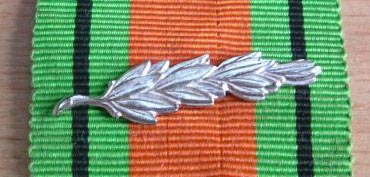
Laurel leaf on ribbon of Defence Medal

Oakleaf on ribbon of War Medal 1939–1945

- Before 1943 there was no physical award other than a card certificate presented to the recipient. An example of a World War II 'Commended for Brave Conduct' certificate (left) gives the details of the recipient and the date of the London Gazette announcement.
- From 1943 a gold and red coloured plastic pin-backed badge was issued to civilian recipients, bearing the design of an upright sword in a wreath, surmounted by a crown. The badge, intended for everyday wear in civilian dress, was 38 millimetres (1.5 in) long by 20 millimetres (0.79 in) wide and was designed by George Kruger Gray, CBE. Normally each recipient received two badges in a small red cardboard box.
- From 1946 the plastic badge was replaced by a silver metal laurel leaf for civilians, with a bronze oak leaf issued to armed forces personnel (including merchant seamen commended in time of war). The bronze oak leaf insignia was identical to that awarded to signify a Mention in Despatches. The devices were worn on the ribbon of the appropriate campaign medal, usually the Defence Medal for civilians and War Medal for servicemen, or directly to tunic or jacket if no medal had been awarded. Devices for commendations for post 1945 campaigns could be worn with the appropriate campaign medal if received.

== Awards ==
- In World War I about 420 'Commendations' were awarded, some posthumously, to men of the British Mercantile Marine.
- In World War II approximately 5,000 'Commendations' were made, including 2,568 to men of the British Merchant Navy, and almost 2,000 to civilians, mostly involved in Civil Defence, such as policemen and firefighters. Awards were also made to service personnel for brave acts where a mention in despatches would not normally be granted. Many awards were made posthumously.
- Some recipients received multiple 'King's Commendations', for example Captain E.G.B. Martin, O.B.E. of the Merchant Navy who received the award three times, on 23 October 1942, 27 August 1943, and finally posthumously on 22 June 1945, in addition to an Order of the British Empire (Officer) Civil Division on 2 June 1944.
- The King's Commendation for Brave Conduct and the Queen's Commendation for Brave Conduct were awarded to 405 Australians. In 1992, Australia ceased recommendations for British awards. In 1975, the Australian Honours System was unilaterally inaugurated and the Australian Bravery Awards were instituted with three medals and a commendation named the Commendation for Brave Conduct.

=== Example awards ===
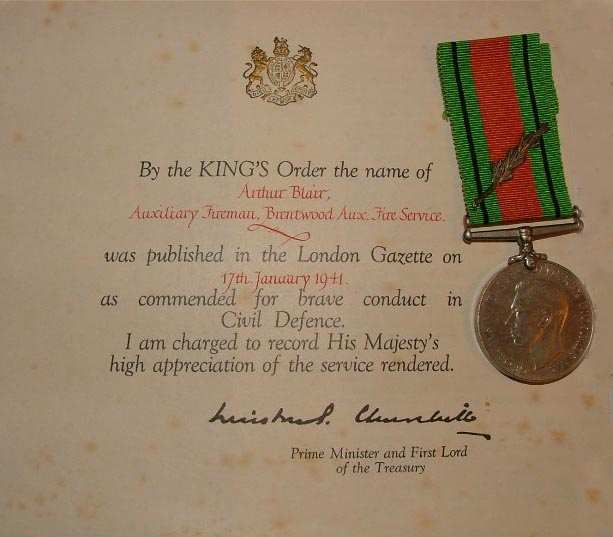
A firefighters 1941 certificate and Defence Medal with Laurel leaf

Examples of awards were those to:

- Engineer Commander Robert John Anderson, Royal Navy, awarded a 'Commendation' for his bravery during the Blitz on Coventry in April 1941.
- John Jarvis, Deputy Depot Ambulance Officer, ARP Casualty Service, Norfolk, awarded a 'Commendation' in July 1941 for his bravery in rescue operations after an aircraft crashed and caught fire.
- Cadet Ernest William Meaby, Air Training Corps, a schoolboy awarded a 'Commendation' in February 1943 for risking his life to rescue the occupants of a crashed aircraft.
- John William Fegan, Mining Surveyor, Adowsena Gold Mine, Gold Coast, Africa, awarded a 'Commendation' in March 1943 for his bravery when an accident occurred in the mine.
- Warden Edwin Ernest Wing, Lincoln Civil Defence, received a 'Commendation' in January 1944 for rescuing children from a burning house.
- John Morrison Ruthven, Chief Refrigeration Engineer, S.S. "Clan Macarthur", Merchant Navy awarded a 'Commendation' in February 1944 for remaining aboard his sinking ship trying to rescue trapped seamen.
- William Henry Shingleton, Leading Compressor Driver, Dover Harbour Board, awarded a 'Commendation' in June 1944 for rescuing men who had strayed into a minefield.
- Policewoman Mabel Ashley, Borough of Tynemouth Police, was awarded a King's Commendation for Brave Conduct in October 1948 for her services when effecting the arrest of a dangerous criminal.
- Donald Campbell, who broke eight world water and land speed records, was posthumously awarded a Queen's Commendation for Brave Conduct on 28 January 1967 'for courage and determination in attacking the world water speed record.'
- TN (Lieutenant) Roberto Seisdedos Naval Aviator of Argentina. for his courageous and risky rescue in Antarctica in FOSSIL BLUFF in 1971 allowing the rescue of two BAS scientists. The decoration was presented by the Admiral of the Fleet Sir Peter Hill Norton

== King's and Queen's Commendations ==
This table summarises the various King's and Queen's Commendations awarded by the United Kingdom:

Period	For Bravery	For Bravery (Air)	For valuable service	For valuable service (Air)
1939 - 1952	King's Commendation for Brave Conduct	–	–	King's Commendation for Valuable Service in the Air
1952 - 1994	Queen's Commendation for Brave Conduct	–	–	Queen's Commendation for Valuable Service in the Air
From 1994	Queen's Commendation for Bravery	Queen's Commendation for Bravery in the Air	Queen's Commendation for Valuable Service	–

== Bibliography ==
- Abbott, Peter (1981). British Gallantry Awards. Nimrod Dix & Co. ISBN 0902633740.
- Dorling, H. Taprell (1956). Ribbons and Medals. A. H. Baldwin & Son.
- Duckers, Peter (2001). British Gallantry Awards 1855–2000. Shire Publications. ISBN 9780747805168.
- Hansard, 6 June 1946. Volume 423. Clement Attlee (Prime Minister) announcement on War Decorations (New Medals)
- Mussell, John W., ed. (2015). The Medal Yearbook 2015. Token Publishing Ltd. ISBN 9781908828316.
- Scarlett, R. J. (1992). Under Hazardous Circumstances. Naval & Military. ISBN 0948130490.
- Slader, John (1988). The Red Duster at War. William Kimber. ISBN 0718306791.
