= King's Commendation for Bravery =

Award of the United Kingdom

King's Commendation for Bravery King's Commendation for Bravery in the Air
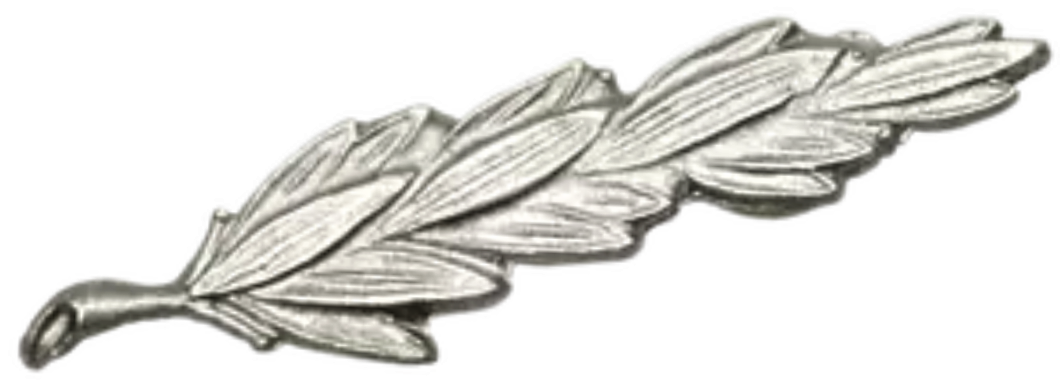
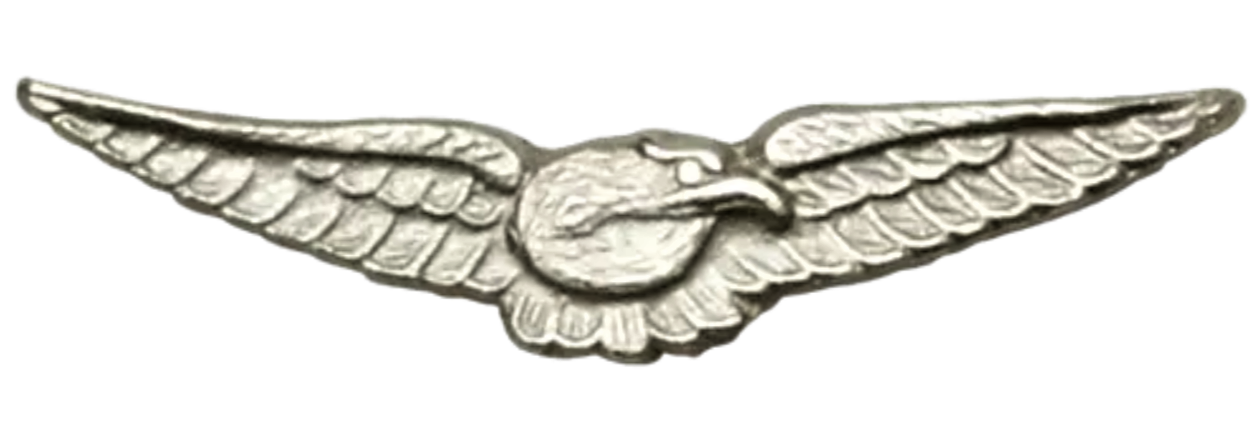
- King's Commendation for Bravery King's Commendation for Bravery in the Air
- Type: Bravery award
- Awarded for: Bravery not in action against an enemy
- Description: Ribbon device in silver
- Presented by: United Kingdom
- Eligibility: Both service personnel and civilians
- Status: Currently awarded
- Established: 1994

The King's Commendation for Bravery and the King's Commendation for Bravery in the Air are United Kingdom awards, open to both military personnel and civilians. They were established in 1994, when the award of the Queen's Commendation for Brave Conduct and the Queen's Commendation for Valuable Service in the Air were discontinued.

== Criteria ==
The two awards are granted for bravery entailing risk to life and meriting national recognition, but not to the standard required of the King's Gallantry Medal. Classed as 'level 4' awards by the Ministry of Defence, they are the lowest level of bravery award, alongside a mention in despatches. The awards do not give rise to post-nominal letters.

The King's Commendation for Bravery is open to both to civilians in peacetime conditions and to all ranks of the British Armed Forces for actions not in the presence of an enemy. It is denoted by a silver spray of laurel leaves.

The King's Commendation for Bravery in the Air is awarded on the same basis, but for acts of bravery in the air. It is denoted by a flying eagle in silver.

King's Commendations can be awarded posthumously, and are not restricted to British subjects.

== Manner of wear ==
The holder is entitled to wear the appropriate device in a similar manner to a mention in despatches. If awarded for bravery in a theatre for which a campaign medal has been granted, it is worn on the ribbon of the appropriate medal. When awarded in peacetime conditions and when no medal is issued, the emblem is worn on the uniform or coat after any medal ribbons. Recipients with no medals wear the device in the position that a single medal would be worn.

From 2003, in addition to British campaign medals, commendation and mention in despatches devices can be worn on United Nations, NATO and EU medals. Originally only one commendation or mention in despatches emblem of each category could be worn on any one medal ribbon. In a change introduced in 2014, those with multiple awards may wear up to three of each commendation and mention in dispatch devices on a single campaign medal and ribbon bar.

== King's and Queen's Commendation awards ==
This table summarises the various King's and Queen's Commendations awarded by the United Kingdom:

Period	For Bravery	For Bravery (Air)	For valuable service	For valuable service (Air)
1939–1952	King's Commendation for Brave Conduct	—	—	King's Commendation for Valuable Service in the Air
1952–1994	Queen's Commendation for Brave Conduct	—	—	Queen's Commendation for Valuable Service in the Air
1994–2022	Queen's Commendation for Bravery	Queen's Commendation for Bravery in the Air	Queen's Commendation for Valuable Service	—
2022–present	King's Commendation for Bravery	King's Commendation for Bravery in the Air	King's Commendation for Valuable Service	—
