= Distinguished Service Medal (United Kingdom) =

Military award for bravery and resourcefulness at sea

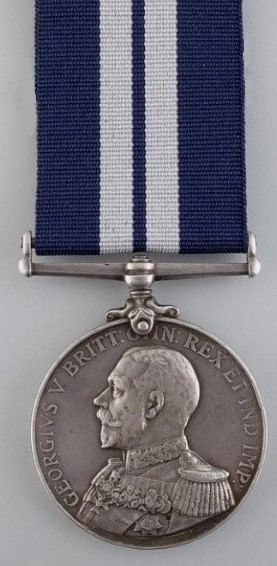
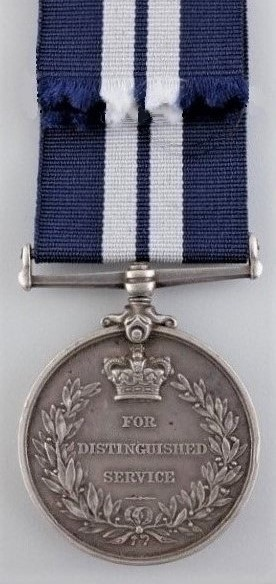
- Obverse and reverse of the medal
- Type: Military decoration.
- Awarded for: Set an example of bravery and resource under fire at sea
- Presented by: UK and Commonwealth
- Eligibility: Royal and Commonwealth Naval ratings
- Status: Discontinued in 1993
- Established: 14 October 1914
- First award: 1914

Highlights
- Total: Circa 11,311
- Ribbon bars. Rosette signifies award of a clasp

Order of Wear
- Next (higher): Union of South Africa Queen’s Silver Medal for Bravery (de jure); George Medal (de facto)
- Next (lower): Military Medal
- Related: Distinguished Service Cross

The Distinguished Service Medal (DSM) was a military decoration awarded until 1993 to personnel of the Royal Navy and members of the other services, and formerly to personnel of other Commonwealth countries, up to and including the rank of Chief Petty Officer (OR-7), for bravery and resourcefulness on active service at sea.

== History ==
The medal was established on 14 October 1914 as the third level decoration for gallantry in action for ratings of the Royal Navy, not at the standard required to receive the Victoria Cross or the Conspicuous Gallantry Medal. The equivalent decoration for Officers and Warrant Officers was the Distinguished Service Cross (DSC). The DSM ranked below the DSC in order of precedence, between the George Medal and the Military Medal after those medals were established in 1940 and 1916 respectively. Awards of the DSM were announced in the London Gazette. Recipients are entitled to use the post-nominal letters "DSM".

The DSM was intended to reward bravery at sea. For example, members of the Royal Naval Division, who served alongside the Army in France in the First World War, were eligible for Army decorations, including the Distinguished Conduct Medal and the Military Medal.

From 1916, ribbon bars could be authorised for subsequent awards of the DSM.

In 1940 the award was extended to Royal Air Force personnel serving with the Fleet and, in 1942, to members of the Merchant Navy, and Army personnel serving afloat, for example manning a merchant ship's anti-aircraft guns. A number of awards were also made to civilians, including two for ferrying troops from the beaches during the 1940 Dunkirk evacuation.

In 1979 eligibility for a number of awards, including the DSM, was extended to permit posthumous awards. Until that time, only the Victoria Cross and a mention in dispatches could be awarded posthumously.

The Distinguished Service Medal was discontinued in 1993, as part of the review of the British honours system which recommended removing distinctions of rank in respect of awards for bravery. Since then the Distinguished Service Cross, previously only open to Commissioned and Warrant Officers, has been awarded to all ranks.

The DSM had also been awarded by Commonwealth countries but by the 1990s most, including Canada, Australia and New Zealand, were establishing their own honours systems and no longer recommended British honours.

== Description ==
- The DSM is a circular silver medal, 36 millimetres (1.4 inches) in diameter, with the following design:
- The obverse bears the effigy and titles of the reigning monarch.
- The reverse has the inscription 'FOR DISTINGUISHED SERVICE' on three lines, within a laurel wreath surmounted by an Imperial crown.
- The suspender is plain and straight.
- The name, rank, service number and ship of the recipient are engraved or impressed on the rim of the medal.
- The ribbon is 32 millimetres (1.25 inches) wide and consists of three equal stripes: dark blue, white, and dark blue, with a thin dark blue stripe down the centre of the white.
- Ribbon bars, indicating a further award, are silver and ornamented with laurel leaves. Bars issued during the First World War were dated on the reverse, while those awarded during the Second World War were undated. When the ribbon alone is worn, a silver rosette denotes the award of each bar.

=== Obverse variations ===
The medal was awarded with one of five obverse designs:

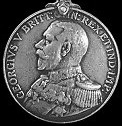
George V (1914–36)

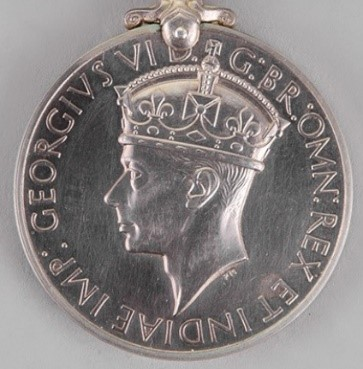
George VI (1st type) 'INDIAE IMP' (1938–49)

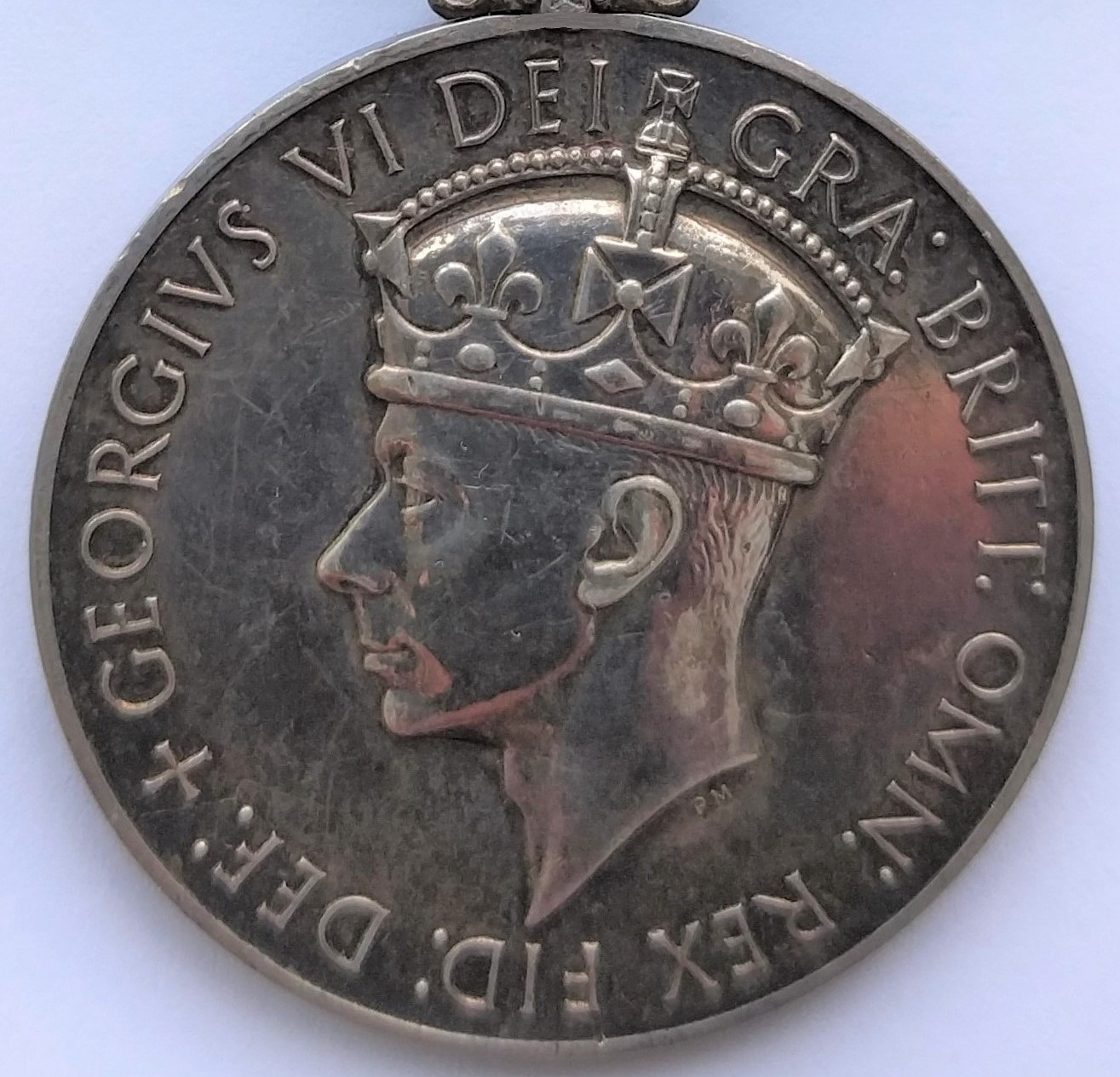
George VI (2nd type) without 'INDIAE IMP' (1949–52)

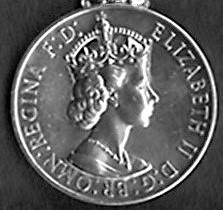
Elizabeth II (1st type) 'BR OMN' (1952–57)

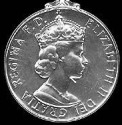
Elizabeth II (2nd type) 'DEI GRATIA' (1957–93)

== Numbers of awards ==
Between 1914 and 1993, approximately 11,311 medals and 227 bars were awarded.

Period	Medals	1st bar	2nd bar	3rd bar
1914–1919	4,100 (Note: Precise estimates vary. 4,100 is a rounded figure from: John W. Mussell. Medal Yearbook 2015. p. 98. Token Publishing Ltd, Honiton, Devon.ISBN 978-1-908-828-16-3)	67	2	–
1920–1938	10	–	–	–
1939–1945	7,132	153	4	1
1946–1993	69 (Note: Abbott lists 55 DSMs from 1947-79. A further 14 were awarded before 1993: S. Georgia: 1; Falklands: 11; Gulf War :2.)	–	–	–
Total	Circa 11,311	220	6	1

These figures include:

- 51 awards to the Army and 23 to the RAF during the Second World War;
- honorary awards made to servicemen from allied countries during both World Wars.
- William Harry Kelly is the only person to have been awarded the Distinguished Service Medal four times (DSM and three bars). He was an asdic operator on ships under Frederic John Walker undertaking anti-submarine warfare during the Second World War.

== See also ==
- British and Commonwealth orders and decorations
- Australian Honours Order of Precedence

== Notes and citations ==
Notes

Citations

== Bibliography ==
- Abbott, Peter E.; Tamplin, John (1981). British Gallantry Awards (2nd ed.). Nimrod Dix and Co, London. ISBN 9780902633742.
- Duckers, Peter (2001). British Gallantry Awards 1855–2000. Shire Publications, Risborough, Buckinghamshire, UK. ISBN 9780747805168.
- Eyre, Simon (2020). The Distinguished Service Medal 1914-1938: The First 25 Years. Spink, London, UK. ISBN 9781912667420.
- Mussell, John, ed. (20 September 2014). Medal Yearbook 2015. Honiton, Devon: Token Publishing Ltd. ISBN 978-1-908828-17-0.
