= Queen's Commendation for Valuable Service in the Air =

UK merit award for flying service

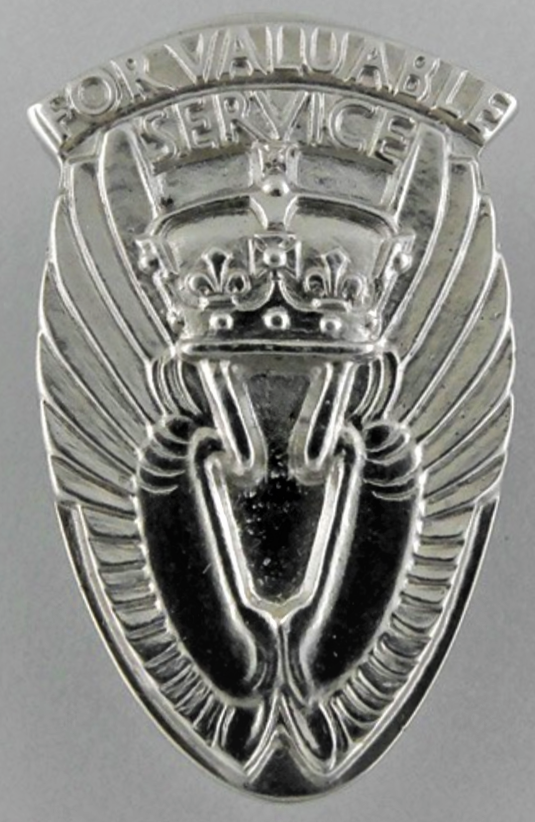
- Obverse of the civilian badge
- Type: Decoration for meritorious service
- Awarded for: Service while flying
- Description: Pin back badge / Ribbon device
- Presented by: the United Kingdom and the Commonwealth
- Eligibility: Both service personnel and civilians
- Status: Discontinued in 1994
- Established: 1942

Highlights
- Total: Circa 3,000
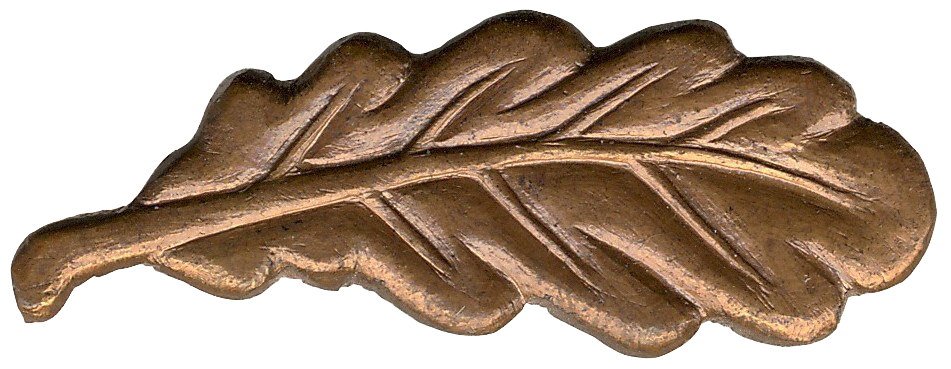
- Bronze oak leaf device of military recipients

The Queen's Commendation for Valuable Service in the Air, formerly the King's Commendation for Valuable Service in the Air, was a merit award for flying service awarded by the United Kingdom between 1942 and 1994. It was replaced by the Queen's Commendation for Bravery in the Air and the Queen's Commendation for Valuable Service.

== Criteria ==
The King's Commendation for Valuable Service in the Air was first awarded in 1942 to reward both meritorious and gallant service while flying, not in the face of an enemy, that did not reach the standard required for the Air Force Cross or the Air Force Medal. It could be awarded to both members of the British and Commonwealth Armed Forces and to civilians. It was renamed the Queen's Commendation for Valuable Service in the Air in 1952, following the accession of Queen Elizabeth II to the throne.

== Appearance ==
Service personnel wear a bronze oak leaf device on the ribbon of the appropriate campaign medal, in the same way as those mentioned in dispatches. A smaller version of the oak leaf is attached to the ribbon when worn alone. Where no campaign medal is awarded, the oak leaf is worn directly on the coat after any medal ribbons. A recipient of both a King's Commendation for Valuable Service in the Air and a mention in dispatches can wear two oak leaves on one ribbon.

In 1945 a special badge was introduced for civilian recipients. Designed by Percy Metcalfe, and approved by King George VI in September 1945, it is silver and consists of two raised wings creating an oval, surmounted by a crown and the words FOR VALUABLE SERVICE. It measures 1.1 inches (28 mm) in height and 0.7 inches (18 mm) wide. It is worn on the coat immediately below any medals or medal ribbons or, in civil airline uniform, on the panel of the left breast pocket. If a recipient has no medals, the badge is worn in the position in which a single ribbon would be worn. The reverse is plain, except for the attachment pin and, in some cases, a registration number.

Although renamed the Queen's Commendation for Valuable Service in the Air in 1952, this did not lead to a change of design.

All recipients also received a certificate, signed by the appropriate government minister.

== Recipients ==
Approximately 3,000 Commendations for Valuable Service in the Air were awarded, including to service personnel and civilians. Among the recipients were a number of civilian, RAF and RN test pilots who received the award in recognition of extraordinary flying during extreme conditions.

- Eric Brown: a test pilot who flew 487 types of aircraft, more than anyone else in history.
- Anne Burns: aeronautical engineer, who took part in many test flights as a scientific observer, became the only woman to receive two Commendations for Valuable Service in the Air, in 1954 and 1962.
- Captain Basil Bradshaw and First Officer Bernard Sedgwick who successfully landed a Laker Airways airliner at Hanover Airport on 17 August 1969 after an electrical fire filled the cabin with fumes.
- Captain Eric Moody who on 24 June 1982 inadvertently flew a British Airways flight into a cloud of volcanic ash resulting in the failure of all four engines. After gliding the aircraft out of the ash cloud, Moody was able to restart the engines and land the aircraft safely at Jakarta Airport.
- First Officer Alastair Stuart Atchison and cabin crew members Susan Gibbins and Nigel Ogden, after the explosive decompression and partial ejection of the captain, of British Airways flight 5390 on 10 June 1990.

== King's and Queen's Commendation awards ==
This table summarises the various King's and Queen's Commendations awarded by the United Kingdom:

Period	For Bravery	For Bravery (Air)	For valuable service	For valuable service (Air)
1939 – 1952	King's Commendation for Brave Conduct	–	–	King's Commendation for Valuable Service in the Air
1952 – 1994	Queen's Commendation for Brave Conduct	–	–	Queen's Commendation for Valuable Service in the Air
1994 – 2022	Queen's Commendation for Bravery	Queen's Commendation for Bravery in the Air	Queen's Commendation for Valuable Service	–
2022 – present	King's Commendation for Bravery	King's Commendation for Bravery in the Air	King's Commendation for Valuable Service	–
