= King's Commendation for Valuable Service =

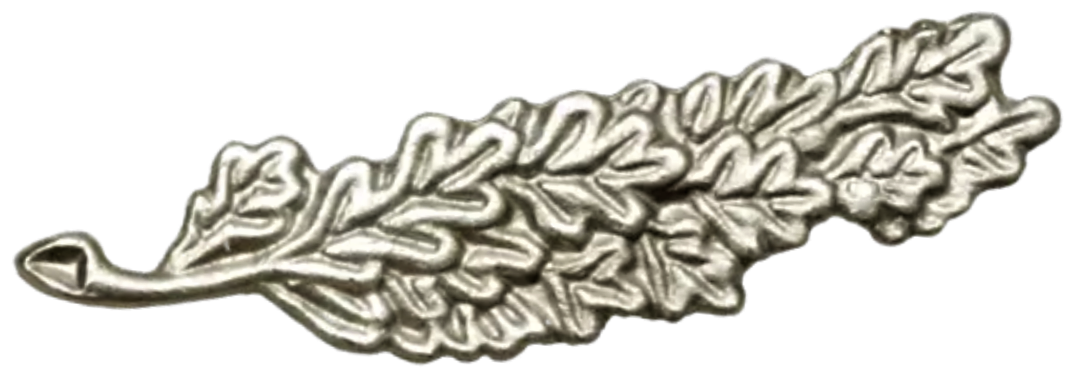
- Ribbon device
- Type: Merit award
- Awarded for: Meritorious service in an operational theatre
- Description: Ribbon device
- Presented by: the United Kingdom
- Eligibility: Personnel of the Armed Forces
- Status: Currently awarded
- Established: 1994

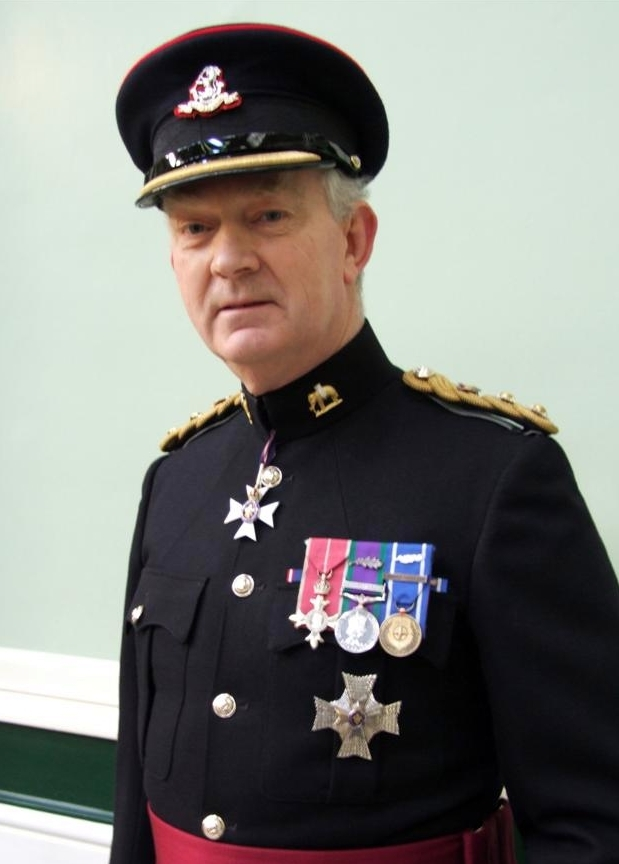
Major General Sir Evelyn Webb-Carter wearing ribbon emblems for mention in despatches and Queen's Commendation for Valuable Service

The King's Commendation for Valuable Service is a British military award for meritorious service in an operational theatre. It was established in 1994, when the award of the Queen's Commendation for Brave Conduct and the Queen's Commendation for Valuable Service in the Air were discontinued.

== Criteria ==
A King’s Commendation for Valuable Service is open to all ranks of the British Armed Forces for meritorious service, not in the face of an enemy, in an operational theatre. It is the lowest level of merit award, classed as 'level 4', alongside a Mention in Despatches and other King's Commendations. The award does not entitle the holder to any post nominal letters.

A King’s Commendation for Valuable Service can be awarded posthumously.

== Manner of wear ==
The holder is entitled to wear an emblem of a spray of silver oak leaves. This should be worn in a similar manner to a mention in despatches. If awarded for services in a theatre for which a campaign medal has been granted, it is worn on the ribbon of the appropriate medal. If the award is made for services where no campaign medal has been granted, the emblem is to be worn directly on the coat after any medal ribbons.

From 2003, in addition to British campaign medals, commendation and mention in despatches devices can be worn on United Nations, NATO and EU medals. Originally only one commendation or mention in despatches emblem of each category could be worn on any one medal ribbon. In a change introduced in 2014, those with multiple awards may wear up to three of each commendation and mention in despatch devices on a single campaign medal and ribbon bar.

== King's and Queen's Commendation awards ==
This table summarises the various King's and Queen's Commendations awarded by the United Kingdom:

Period	For Bravery	For Bravery (Air)	For valuable service	For valuable service (Air)
1939–1952	King's Commendation for Brave Conduct	–	–	King’s Commendation for Valuable Service in the Air
1952–1994	Queen's Commendation for Brave Conduct	–	–	Queen’s Commendation for Valuable Service in the Air
1994–2022	Queen's Commendation for Bravery	Queen's Commendation for Bravery in the Air	Queen's Commendation for Valuable Service	–
2022–present	King's Commendation for Bravery	King's Commendation for Bravery in the Air	King's Commendation for Valuable Service	–
