= List of British gallantry awards for the Iraq War =

A list of British awards for gallantry in the Iraq War, awarded between 2003 and 2010. Apart from appointments to purely military orders, only gallantry awards have been included and only those that allow post-nominal letters (this excludes appointments to the Order of the British Empire for distinguished service and fourth-level awards such as Mentions-in-Despatches and Queen's Commendations).

The list includes the rank and decorations the recipient held at the time, together with their regiment, corps or service, and the date of publication of the award in the London Gazette. The first honours list was published in October 2003, and covered the initial invasion period from 19 March to 19 April. Thereafter lists covered six month periods of operations, ending in March or September, normally being published several months later. The final list was published in March 2010.

== Victoria Cross ==
The Victoria Cross (VC) is the highest award for gallantry in the presence of the enemy, and is also the highest honour in the British Honours System. A miniature of the award is worn on the undress uniform to indicate the unique nature of the award.

- Private Johnson Gideon Beharry, The Princess of Wales's Royal Regiment, March 2005

== George Cross ==
The George Cross (GC) is the highest civilian award for bravery, and ranks as second only to the Victoria Cross. It may be awarded to members of the armed forces for acts of heroism not in the presence of the enemy. A miniature of this award is also worn in undress.

- Trooper Christopher Finney, The Blues and Royals, October 2003
- Captain Peter Allen Norton, The Royal Logistic Corps, March 2006

== Order of the Bath ==
Senior officers may be appointed to the Order of the Bath for distinguished service. There are three Divisions: Knight Grand Cross (GCB), Knight Commander (KCB) and Companion (CB).

KCB:

- Air Marshal Brian Kevin Burridge CBE, Royal Air Force, October 2003
- Lieutenant General John George Reith CB CBE, late The Parachute Regiment, October 2003; CB for service in Kosovo / Macedonia, CBE for service in the Gulf War; previously Mentioned in Despatches and appointed OBE for service in Northern Ireland, and also awarded QCVS for service in former Yugoslavia

CB:

- Air Vice Marshal Andrew David White, Royal Air Force, October 2003

== Distinguished Service Order ==
The Distinguished Service Order (DSO) is awarded for leadership during operations. It may be awarded to any rank, but the majority of awards are to officers of at least the rank of lieutenant colonel (or equivalent) commanding recognised formations. Although an Order, and with only one Class - Companion - bars may be awarded for further periods of service meriting an appointment to the Order.

- Major Charles Kane Antelme, Welsh Guards, serving with Special Air Service (SAS), July 2008
- Wing Commander Stuart David Atha, Royal Air Force, October 2003; later awarded QCVS for service in Afghanistan
- Brigadier Graham John Binns CBE MC, late The Prince of Wales's Own Regiment of Yorkshire, October 2003; CBE and MC both for actions in former Yugoslavia; previously appointed MBE for service in Northern Ireland
- Major John Henry Bowron, The Light Infantry, March 2005; previously awarded QCVS for service in Northern Ireland, later appointed OBE for further service in Iraq
- Major General Robin Vaughan Brims CBE, late The Light Infantry, October 2003; CBE for service in Northern Ireland, previously Mentioned in Despatches, and appointed MBE and OBE, all for services in Northern Ireland; also awarded QCVS for service in former Yugoslavia; later appointed Officer of US Legion of Merit for service in Iraq and appointed CB
- Major James Chenevix Coote, The Princess of Wales's Royal Regiment, March 2005
- Major James Alexander Delacour De Labilliere MBE, The Rifles, March 2010; MBE for service in former Yugoslavia / Albania
- Brigadier Timothy Paul Evans MBE, late The Light Infantry, March 2008; previously Mentioned in Despatches for actions in the Gulf (not gazetted until 1997)
- Major Angus George Costeker Fair, The Royal Scots Dragoon Guards, December 2006; bar awarded for later service in Afghanistan
- Major General Graeme Cameron Maxwell Lamb CMG OBE, late The Queen's Own Highlanders, April 2004; OBE for service in the Gulf (not gazetted until 1994), also Mentioned in Despatches and awarded QCVS for actions in Northern Ireland; later appointed Officer of US Legion of Merit for service in Iraq
- Lieutenant Colonel Justin Charles Wladyslaw Maciejewski MBE, The Rifles, March 2008; previously awarded QCVS for service in Iraq
- Lieutenant Colonel Matthew Philip Maer MBE, The Princess of Wales's Royal Regiment, March 2005; MBE for service in former Yugoslavia
- Lieutenant Colonel Jorge Emanuel Mendonca MBE, The Queen's Lancashire Regiment, April 2004
- Colonel Gordon Kenneth Messenger OBE, Royal Marines, October 2003; OBE for service in former Yugoslavia, bar to DSO awarded for later service in Afghanistan
- Lieutenant Colonel Michael Lawrence Riddell-Webster, The Black Watch, October 2003; previously awarded QCVS for service in former Yugoslavia, later awarded QCVS for service in Northern Ireland
- Lieutenant Colonel Patrick Nicholas Yardley Monrad Sanders OBE, The Rifles, July 2008; OBE for previous service in Iraq
- Major Richard Cowan Taylor, The Life Guards, October 2003
- Wing Commander Ian David Teakle OBE, Royal Air Force, October 2003; OBE for service in Kosovo / Macedonia

== Conspicuous Gallantry Cross ==
The Conspicuous Gallantry Cross (CGC) is the next level of award down from the Victoria Cross for gallantry in the face of the enemy.

- Sergeant Christopher Mark Broome, The Princess of Wales's Royal Regiment, March 2005
- Sergeant Terry Bryan, 1st Regiment Royal Horse Artillery, Royal Regiment of Artillery, March 2005
- Corporal John Collins, The Parachute Regiment, December 2006
- Colour Sergeant Leonard John Durber, The Parachute Regiment, March 2009
- Lance Corporal of Horse Michael John Flynn, The Blues and Royals, October 2003; later awarded MC for actions in Afghanistan
- Corporal Benjamin Paul Greensmith, The Parachute Regiment, September 2004 (not gazetted until March 2008); later awarded MC for further actions in Iraq (recorded below)
- Colour Sergeant James Royce Harkess, The Worcestershire and Sherwood Foresters Regiment, December 2006
- Sergeant Jonathan Stuart Hollingsworth QGM, The Parachute Regiment, July 2007 (killed in action); QGM for actions in Northern Ireland
- Corporal Shaun Garry Jardine, The King's Own Scottish Borderers, April 2004
- Corporal Adam William Miller, Corps of Royal Electrical and Mechanical Engineers, March 2008
- Sergeant Gordon Robertson, The Parachute Regiment, April 2004
- Marine Justin Royston Thomas, Royal Marines, October 2003
- Corporal Terence Alan Thomson, The Princess of Wales's Royal Regiment, March 2005
- Acting Colour Sergeant Matthew Richard Tomlinson, Royal Marines, March 2006; later awarded MC for actions in Afghanistan
- Staff Sergeant James Anthony Wadsworth, The Royal Logistic Corps, March 2008

== Royal Red Cross ==
The Royal Red Cross is awarded for distinguished nursing service. There are two classes: Members (RRC) and Associates (ARRC). Officers of the rank of lieutenant colonel and above will normally be admitted as Members; Membership is also awarded to those Associates providing a second period of service worthy of recognition.

RRC:

- Major Tessa Joanne Grieves, Queen Alexandra's Royal Army Nursing Corps, March 2009
- Major Janet Mary Pilgrim ARRC, Queen Alexandra's Royal Army Nursing Corps, July 2008; ARRC for service in Afghanistan, previously awarded QCVS for service in Kosovo / Macedonia
- Lieutenant Colonel Caroline Whittaker TD, Queen Alexandra's Royal Army Nursing Corps, April 2004

ARRC:

- Corporal Jennifer Anne Daw, Princess Mary's Royal Air Force Nursing Service, December 2006
- Lieutenant Julian Peter Despres, Queen Alexandra's Royal Naval Nursing Service, October 2003
- Flight Lieutenant Cormac Francis Doyle, Princess Mary's Royal Air Force Nursing Service, July 2007
- Staff Sergeant Huw Francis Isaac Jones, Queen Alexandra's Royal Army Nursing Corps, July 2007
- Sergeant Gary Anthony King, Queen Alexandra's Royal Army Nursing Corps, July 2008
- Captain Nicola Denise Watson, Queen Alexandra's Royal Army Nursing Corps, October 2003

== Distinguished Service Cross ==
The Distinguished Service Cross (DSC) is the third-level medal awarded for gallantry in the face of the enemy at sea.

- Lieutenant Commander Philip Charles Ireland, Royal Navy, October 2003

== Military Cross ==
The Military Cross (MC) is the third-level medal awarded for gallantry in the face of the enemy on land.

=== Royal Navy ===
- Corporal David John Beresford, Royal Marines, October 2003
- Marine Richard Thomas Bywater, Royal Marines, October 2003 (not gazetted until March 2005)
- Captain Christopher Edward Haw, Royal Marines, October 2003
- Captain James Knight, Royal Marines, July 2007
- Corporal Terry Robert Knights, Royal Marines, July 2007
- Captain Paul Patrick Lynch, Royal Marines, October 2003
- Marine Gareth Thomas, Royal Marines, October 2003
- Corporal Peter Raymond Watts, Royal Marines, October 2003

=== Army ===
==== Cavalry ====
- Lance Corporal Christopher Stephen Balmforth, The Queen's Royal Hussars, March 2005
- Corporal of Horse Glynn Ashley Bell, The Blues and Royals, April 2004
- Lieutenant Simon Thomas Farebrother, The Queen's Dragoon Guards, October 2003
- Sergeant Christopher Paul Richards, Royal Dragoon Guards, March 2009
- Major Henry Francis Austin Sugden, The Queen's Dragoon Guards, October 2003

==== Artillery ====
- Captain Grant Ingleton, Royal Regiment of Artillery, October 2003

==== Infantry ====
- Captain Ibrar Ali, The Yorkshire Regiment, July 2007
- Warrant Officer Class 1 Andrew Allman, The Parachute Regiment, October 2003 (not gazetted until March 2005)
- Corporal Simon John Barry, The Parachute Regiment, March 2009
- Captain Robert James Bassett-Cross, Scots Guards, December 2006
- Sergeant Nathan Lewis Bell, The Parachute Regiment, October 2003; previously Mentioned in Despatches for actions in Sierra Leone
- Guardsman Anton Liam Branchflower, Irish Guards, October 2003
- Captain Delmore Alexander Britton QGM, The Parachute Regiment, October 2003 (not gazetted until September 2005); QGM for actions in Northern Ireland, also Mentioned in Despatches for actions in the Gulf (not gazetted until 1997)
- Lieutenant Alex John Burgess, The Princess of Wales's Royal Regiment, July 2007; later Mentioned in Despatches for actions in Afghanistan
- Corporal Mark Richard Byles, The Princess of Wales's Royal Regiment, March 2005
- Lieutenant Charles Oliver Campbell, The Royal Regiment of Fusiliers, October 2003
- Lance Corporal Nicholas Alan Thomas Coleman, The Devonshire and Dorset Light Infantry, December 2006
- Private Ryan John Copping, The Princess of Wales's Royal Regiment, December 2006
- Lance Corporal Trevor Raywood Coult, The Royal Irish Regiment, September 2006
- Captain Jeremy Alexander Crossley, The Rifles, March 2009
- Major Ian Grange Crowley, The Yorkshire Regiment, March 2008
- Corporal Anthony William Currie, The King's Own Scottish Borderers, April 2004
- Kingsman Michael Davison, The King's and Cheshire Regiment, Territorial Army, April 2004
- Second Lieutenant Richard Gordon Deane, The Royal Irish Regiment, March 2005
- Staff Sergeant Brendan William Elliott, The Royal Anglian Regiment, September 2009
- Fusilier David Owen Evans, The Royal Welch Fusiliers, March 2005
- Acting Warrant Officer Class 2 Mark David Evans, The Royal Welch Fusiliers, March 2005
- Warrant Officer Class 2 David Gordon Falconer, The Princess of Wales's Royal Regiment, March 2005
- Major Justin Burritt Featherstone, The Princess of Wales's Royal Regiment, March 2005
- Warrant Officer Class 2 Brian Gerard Forrester, The Parachute Regiment, September 2009
- Colour Sergeant Benjamin Paul Greensmith CGC, The Parachute Regiment, July 2008; CGC for earlier actions in Iraq (recorded above)
- Acting Sergeant Neil Griffiths, The Royal Welch Fusiliers, March 2005
- Lieutenant Christopher Ashley Head, The Royal Regiment of Fusiliers, October 2003
- Major Richard Alexander Head, The Light Infantry, December 2006; later awarded QCVS for service in Afghanistan
- Major James Benjamin Weston Hollister, The King's Regiment, April 2004; later appointed MBE for further service in Iraq
- Corporal Steven Phillip Iszard, The Princess of Wales's Royal Regiment, December 2006
- Sergeant Paul Joseph Kelly, The Princess of Wales's Royal Regiment, September 2004
- Colour Sergeant Stephen Kincaid, The Parachute Regiment, March 2008
- Lance Corporal Peter William Laing, The Black Watch, October 2003; later awarded QGM for further actions in Iraq (recorded below)
- Major Jeremy Lamb, The Royal Regiment of Fusiliers, July 2007
- Second Lieutenant Rupert Grenville Simon Lane, The Rifles, March 2008
- Colour Sergeant Mark Anthony Langridge, The Parachute Regiment, March 2008
- Warrant Officer Class 2 Robert Gerald Leeds, The Parachute Regiment, March 2010; previously awarded QCB for actions in Northern Ireland
- Warrant Officer Class 2 Darren William Leigh, The Queen's Lancashire Regiment, April 2004
- Rifleman Mark David Lunn, The Rifles, March 2008
- Sergeant James Eric Newell, The Parachute Regiment, September 2006
- Major Mark Andrew Peter Nooney, The Princess of Wales's Royal Regiment, December 2006
- Sergeant Michael Craig O'Brien, The Parachute Regiment, March 2008
- Lieutenant Daniel Charles Morgan O'Connell, Irish Guards, October 2003
- Second Lieutenant Thomas Peter Algar Orde-Powlett, Irish Guards, October 2003
- Corporal Richard Thomas Pask, The Royal Welsh, March 2008
- Sergeant David Anthony Harrington Perfect, The Princess of Wales's Royal Regiment, March 2005
- Acting Warrant Officer Class 2 Rodney Alan Poulter, The Rifles, March 2008
- Colour Sergeant Alexander Joseph Reid, The Parachute Regiment, October 2003 (not gazetted until March 2006); previously Mentioned in Despatches for actions in Sierra Leone (not gazetted until 2003)
- Colour Sergeant Jason Paul Roberge, The Parachute Regiment, October 2003 (not gazetted until March 2006)
- Lance Corporal Sean Vitty Ernest Robson, The Princess of Wales's Royal Regiment, March 2005
- Corporal John William Randolph Rose, The Black Watch, October 2003
- Lance Sergeant Steven Eric Ross, Grenadier Guards, December 2006
- Private Troy O'Neil Samuels, The Princess of Wales's Royal Regiment, March 2005
- Private Jokini Sivoinauca, The Rifles, July 2007
- Captain James Duncan Stenner, Welsh Guards, October 2003 (gazetted posthumously in April 2004)
- Major Stephen Nicholas Webb, The Royal Welsh, March 2008
- Lance Corporal Brian Wood, The Princess of Wales's Royal Regiment, March 2005
- Major James Medley Woodham, The Royal Anglian Regiment, March 2006

==== Support Corps ====
- Captain Simon Daniel Bratcher, The Royal Logistic Corps, March 2006; later awarded US Bronze Star Medal for actions in Iraq
- Corporal Craig George James Comber, Corps of Royal Electrical and Mechanical Engineers, October 2003
- Lance Corporal Darren George Dickson, The Royal Logistic Corps, Territorial Army, March 2005
- Captain Graham Bentley 256 Canine SAR 1st WD Regiment, March 2005
- Lieutenant Colonel Robert Charles Fram, Corps of Royal Electrical and Mechanical Engineers, March 2008
- Sergeant Mark Jack Heley, Corps of Royal Engineers, October 2003
- Staff Sergeant Richard Peter Thomas Johnson, Corps of Royal Engineers, October 2003
- Staff Sergeant Christopher Brian Lyndhurst, Corps of Royal Electrical and Mechanical Engineers, July 2007
- Sergeant Mark McDougall, Corps of Royal Engineers, July 2008
- Private Michelle Suzanne Claire Norris, Royal Army Medical Corps, December 2006; first female award
- Lieutenant Toby Christian Rider, Corps of Royal Engineers, October 2003
- Lance Corporal Paul Christopher Wilson, Corps of Royal Electrical and Mechanical Engineers, July 2007

=== Royal Air Force ===
- Corporal David James Hayden, Royal Air Force Regiment, March 2008; first award to RAF NCO

== Distinguished Flying Cross ==
The Distinguished Flying Cross (DFC) is the third-level medal awarded for gallantry in the face of the enemy in the air.

Bar to DFC:

- Squadron Leader Philip Jeremy Robinson DFC, Royal Air Force, October 2003 (not gazetted until September 2006); original award (dated 2002, not gazetted until 2003) and later second bar for actions in Afghanistan
- Squadron Leader Paul Graham Shepherd DFC, Royal Air Force, October 2003 (not gazetted until September 2006); original award for actions in Sierra Leone (not gazetted until 2003)

DFC:

- Flight Lieutenant Shane William Anderson, Royal Air Force, March 2006
- Staff Sergeant Rupert St John Hardington Banfield, Army Air Corps, October 2003
- Squadron Leader Stephen Robin Carr, Royal Air Force, October 2003
- Major William David Chesarek, United States Marine Corps, December 2006
- Captain Richard Timothy Cuthill, Army Air Corps, October 2003
- Flight Lieutenant Owen Eifion Edwards, Royal Air Force, October 2003 (not gazetted until March 2005)
- Flight Lieutenant Michelle Jayne Goodman, Royal Air Force, March 2008; first female award
- Flight Lieutenant Kevin Harris, Royal Air Force, March 2009
- Squadron Leader David John Knowles, Royal Air Force, October 2003
- Flight Lieutenant Scott Morley, Royal Air Force, October 2003
- Acting Lieutenant Commander James Lloyd Newton, Royal Navy, October 2003
- Squadron Leader Harv Smyth, Royal Air Force, October 2003
- Flight Lieutenant Andrew David Turk, Royal Air Force, October 2003
- Squadron Leader John Turner, Royal Air Force, October 2003
- Squadron Leader Ian Warwick Richard Walton, Royal Air Force, October 2003
- Captain Scott Warwick Watkins, Australian Army Aviation, September 2005

== Air Force Cross ==
The Air Force Cross (AFC) is also a third-level award for gallantry in the air, awarded for actions whilst not in active operations against the enemy.

- Wing Commander Kevin Havelock, Royal Air Force, October 2003
- Flight Lieutenant Nicholas Robert Ireland, Royal Air Force, October 2003

== George Medal ==
The George Medal (GM) is the next level below the George Cross for bravery not in the face of the enemy.

- Corporal Martin Paul Caines, The Princess of Wales's Royal Regiment, December 2006
- Captain Kevin Michael David Ivison, The Royal Logistic Corps, September 2006
- Staff Sergeant Gary John O'Donnell, The Royal Logistic Corps, December 2006; awarded posthumous bar for actions in Afghanistan
- Warrant Officer Class 1 Nicholas Keith Pettit QGM, Corps of Royal Engineers, April 2004; QGM for actions in former Yugoslavia
- Fusilier Daniel James Smith, The Royal Regiment of Fusiliers, September 2006

== Queen's Gallantry Medal ==
The Queen's Gallantry Medal (QGM) is the third-level medal awarded for bravery not in the face of the enemy.

Bar to QGM:

- Captain Eamon Conrad Heakin QGM, The Royal Logistic Corps, March 2008; original award for actions in Northern Ireland, later awarded US Bronze Star medal for actions in Iraq
- Captain Vincent Michael Strafford QGM, The Royal Logistic Corps, March 2008; original award for actions in Afghanistan

QGM:

- Warrant Officer Class 2 Brendan James Campbell, Irish Guards, March 2008
- Lance Corporal Simon David Campbell RVM, Irish Guards, April 2004 (not gazetted until September 2004)
- Warrant Officer Class 2 Adrian Robert Craddock, The Royal Logistic Corps, March 2005; later awarded US Bronze Star Medal for service in Iraq
- Private Damian Kenneth Currie, The Black Watch, March 2005
- Colour Sergeant Carl Philip Dakin, The Parachute Regiment, October 2003 (not gazetted until March 2005)
- Acting Staff Sergeant Simon James De Gruchy, The Royal Logistic Corps, September 2005
- Captain Crispin Tony Grant Driver-Williams, The Royal Logistic Corps, March 2005
- Captain Timothy Robert Gould, The Royal Logistic Corps, October 2003
- Sergeant Stephen Robert Goulding, Corps of Royal Engineers, March 2005
- Corporal Michael Glen Harrold, The Queen's Royal Lancers, July 2007
- Staff Sergeant Chris James Hewett, The Royal Logistic Corps, September 2006
- Corporal John Austin Hiscock, Royal Marines, October 2003
- Corporal Peter William Laing MC, The Black Watch, March 2005; MC for previous actions in Iraq (recorded above)
- Private Jonetani Matia Lawaci, The Black Watch, March 2005
- Private Michael David McLaughlin, The Black Watch, September 2005
- Captain Taitusi Kagi Saukuru, The King's Regiment, September 2004
- Sergeant Andrew William Sindall, Corps of Royal Engineers, October 2003
- Lance Sergeant Kevin William Tomlinson, Irish Guards, March 2008
- Guardsman Lee Wheeler, Irish Guards, April 2004 (not gazetted until September 2004)
- Lance Corporal Michael Andrew Wilkinson, The Royal Anglian Regiment, July 2007
- Staff Sergeant Anthony Michael Wyles, Corps of Royal Engineers, Territorial Army, April 2004

== See also ==
- British honours system
- Operation Telic
- List of British gallantry awards for the War in Afghanistan
