= List of British gallantry awards for the War in Afghanistan (2001–2021) =

A list of British awards for gallantry in the War in Afghanistan from 2001 to 2021. Apart from appointments to purely military orders, only gallantry awards have been included and only those that allow post-nominal letters (this excludes appointments to the Order of the British Empire for distinguished service and fourth-level awards such as Mentions-in-Despatches and Queen's Commendations).

The list includes the rank and decorations the recipient held at the time, together with their regiment, corps or service, and the date of publication of the award in the London Gazette. The first honours list was published in October 2002, covering the period from October 2001 to March 2002, and subsequent lists have each covered six-month periods of operations, ending in March or September. The latest list was published in July 2015 and covered the period ending 31 December 2014.

== Victoria Cross ==
The Victoria Cross (VC) is the highest award for gallantry in the presence of the enemy, and is also the highest honour in the British Honours System. A miniature of the award is worn on the undress uniform to indicate the unique nature of the award.

- Corporal Bryan James Budd, The Parachute Regiment, December 2006 (killed in action)

During July and August, A Company of 3 Para were deployed into Sangin, where their position was constantly under attack. On 27 July, during a patrol, a member of Corporal Budd's section was shot and seriously injured in open ground. Budd led an assault against a building, causing the enemy to retreat, allowing the evacuation and treatment of the wounded soldier. On 20 August, on another patrol, Budd's section again came under heavy fire, with two soldiers being wounded. He assaulted the enemy single-handedly, continuing even when himself wounded. This inspired the remainder of the platoon to renew their attack, and force the withdrawal of the enemy. Budd subsequently died of his wounds. His "single-handed action... and his determination, though wounded, to push on against a superior enemy force stands out as a premeditated act of inspirational leadership and the greatest valour".

- Lance Corporal James Thomas Duane Ashworth, Grenadier Guards, June 2012 (killed in action)

On 13 June 2012, in the Nahr-e-Saraj District of Helmand Province, Lance Corporal Ashworth led his fire-team into the heart of an insurgent-dominated village. The initial attack resulted in the deaths of two insurgents and the recovery of two sniper rifles; however, the follow-up attack by Afghan local police stalled when a policeman was shot and killed. Ashworth moved to the front of his fire-team and pursued the attack, breaking into an enemy compound under machine-gun fire and driving the insurgents into an out-building. He then relentlessly crawled forward under fierce enemy fire to neutralise an enemy sniper with his final grenade. Placing himself in full view of the enemy to accurately throw his grenade, Ashworth was hit by enemy fire and killed before he could neutralise the sniper; however, his actions galvanised his platoon, which completed the clearance of the compound. His "total disregard for his own safety...was the gallant last action of a soldier who had willingly placed himself in the line of fire on numerous occasions earlier in the attack. This supremely courageous and inspiring action deserves the highest recognition."

- Lance Corporal Joshua Mark Leakey, Parachute Regiment, August 2013

The actions for which Leakey was awarded the Victoria Cross occurred on 22 August 2013 in Helmand Province, Afghanistan. A routine joint patrol composed of British paratroopers, US Marines and Afghan soldiers had targeted a village to search for illegal weapons. Having been flown into the area in Chinook helicopters, the patrol was attacked by machine gun fire and rocket-propelled grenades soon after dismounting. Leakey's helicopter had landed on a hill near the village and he, with three other paratroopers and an Afghan soldier, were to provide fire support for the main segment of the patrol. From their vantage point, his section could see the attack and heard over their radio that someone had been injured. Leakey ran up the hill to assess the seriousness of the attack and came to the conclusion that urgent action was needed. Though he was only a lance corporal, he took control of the situation and led his section down to the group under attack.

Having reached the group under attack, he gave first aid to the wounded US Marine Corps captain and began to evacuate him from the battlefield. While under fire, he returned to the machine guns that his section had left at the top of the hill. He moved one to a better position to fire at the attacking Taliban even though he was under constant, accurate fire (bullets were ricocheting off the weapon he was carrying). His actions inspired other soldiers to join in the fight back.

While he was manning the machine gun, he was also shouting updates of the situation into his radio. Having realised that more than one machine gun would be needed to effectively fight back the insurgents, he allowed his gun to be taken over by another soldier. He then ran once more through heavy fire to retrieve a second machine gun, position it in a suitable site, and then manned it to fire at the Taliban.

The skirmish lasted approximately 45 minutes during which 11 insurgents were killed and four wounded. It was only when air support arrived that fighting ceased. When it did, he handed the second machine gun over to another soldier. He then returned to the injured American officer and oversaw his medical evacuation.

The Ministry of Defence summarised the reasons for awarding Leakey the Victoria Cross as follows:

Under fire yet undeterred by the very clear and present danger, Lance Corporal Leakey ran across the exposed slope of the hill three times to initiate casualty evacuation, re-site machine guns and return fire. His actions proved the turning point, inspiring his comrades to fight back with renewed ferocity. Displaying gritty leadership well above that expected of his rank, Lance Corporal Leakey's actions singlehandedly regained the initiative and prevented considerable loss of life.

== George Cross ==
The George Cross (GC) is the highest civilian award for bravery, and ranks equal to the Victoria Cross. It may be awarded to members of the armed forces for acts of heroism not in the presence of the enemy. A miniature of this award is also worn in undress.

- Lance Corporal Matthew Croucher, Royal Marines Reserve, July 2008
- Colour Sergeant Kevin Haberfield, Royal Marines, August 2005
- Staff Sergeant Kim Spencer Hughes, The Royal Logistic Corps, March 2010
- Staff Sergeant Olaf Sean George Schmid, The Royal Logistic Corps, March 2010 (killed in action)
- Corporal Mark William Wright, The Parachute Regiment, December 2006 (killed in action)

== Order of the Bath ==
Senior officers may be appointed to the Order of the Bath for distinguished service. There are three Divisions: Knight Grand Cross (GCB), Knight Commander (KCB) and Companion (CB).

KCB:

- Lieutenant General David Julian Richards CBE DSO, late Royal Regiment of Artillery, July 2007; CBE for service in East Timor, DSO for service in Sierra Leone; previously Mentioned in Despatches for actions in Northern Ireland, later appointed GCB

== Distinguished Service Order ==
The Distinguished Service Order (DSO) is awarded for leadership during operations. It may be awarded to any rank, but the majority of awards are to officers of at least the rank of lieutenant colonel (or equivalent) commanding recognised formations. Although an Order, and with only one Class - Companion - bars may be awarded for further periods of service meriting an appointment to the Order.

Bar to DSO:

- Lieutenant Colonel James Alexander Delacour De Labilliere DSO MBE, The Rifles, March 2012; original award for service in Iraq, MBE for service in former Yugoslavia / Albania
- Lieutenant Colonel Angus George Costeker Fair DSO, The Light Dragoons, March 2010; original award for service in Iraq
- Brigadier Gordon Kenneth Messenger DSO OBE, Royal Marines, September 2009; original award for service in Iraq, OBE for service in former Yugoslavia

DSO:

- Major Piers Lyndon Ashfield, Grenadier Guards, March 2013
- Lieutenant Colonel Michael Patrick Aston, MC, The Royal Anglian Regiment, March 2013
- Lieutenant Colonel Stuart Martin Birrell, Royal Marines, July 2008; previously Mentioned in Despatches for actions in Northern Iraq / Southern Turkey
- Major Paul Allen Blair, The Parachute Regiment, December 2006
- Lieutenant Colonel Nicholas Robert Macrae Borton, The Royal Regiment of Scotland, March 2009
- Brigadier Robert Bernard Bruce, late The Royal Regiment of Scotland, 4 October 2013
- Lieutenant Colonel Edward Adam Butler MBE, The Royal Green Jackets, October 2002 (not gazetted until March 2005); previously Mentioned in Despatches for actions in Northern Ireland, awarded QCVS for service in former Yugoslavia and QCVS for service in Sierra Leone (also not gazetted until March 2005); later appointed CBE for further service in Afghanistan
- Major General Nicholas Patrick Carter CBE, late Royal Green Jackets, March 2011; CBE for previous service in Afghanistan; previously awarded QCVS for service in former Yugoslavia and QCVS for service in Iraq, also appointed OBE for service in former Yugoslavia / Albania
- Lieutenant Colonel Stuart William Carver, The Royal Anglian Regiment, March 2008; previously Mentioned in Despatches for actions in Northern Ireland
- Lieutenant Colonel Joseph Desmond Cavanagh, The Rifles, September 2009
- Brigadier Douglas McKenzie Chalmers, OBE, late The Princess of Wales’s Royal Regiment, March 2013
- Lieutenant Colonel Charles Seymour Collins MBE, The Rifles, March 2011
- Brigadier James Michael Cowan OBE, late The Royal Regiment of Scotland, September 2010; OBE for service in Iraq; also awarded QCVS for service in Iraq and Mentioned in Despatches for actions in Northern Ireland
- Acting Colonel Neil Alexander Den-McKay, OBE, The Royal Regiment of Scotland, July 2015
- Lieutenant Colonel Edward Anthony Fenton, The Royal Regiment of Scotland, September 2012
- Major Adam Nicholas Baron Foden, The Queen’s Royal Lancers, 4 October 2013
- Major Giles Richard Harris MBE, Welsh Guards, March 2010; MBE for service in Iraq
- Lieutenant Colonel Andrew Sean David Harrison MBE, The Parachute Regiment, September 2011; MBE for service in Sierra Leone; also awarded QCVS for service in Iraq
- Lieutenant Colonel Matthew John Holmes, Royal Marines, July 2007
- Lieutenant Colonel Harry Arthur Blair Holt OBE, Irish Guards, September 2010; previously awarded QCVS for "service in the field"
- Lieutenant Colonel Matthew John Andrew Jackson, Royal Marines, 4 October 2013
- Lieutenant Colonel Paul Melvyn James, Royal Marines, March 2011
- Lieutenant Colonel Nicholas Jan Kitson, The Rifles, September 2010
- Brigadier John Gordon Lorimer MBE, late The Parachute Regiment, March 2008
- Lieutenant Colonel James Rowland Martin, MC, The Princess of Wales’s Royal Regiment, February 2015
- Major General John Chalmers McColl CBE, late The Royal Anglian Regiment, October 2002; CBE for service in former Yugoslavia; also Mentioned in Despatches for actions in former Yugoslavia and appointed OBE for service in Northern Ireland; later appointed Officer of US Legion of Merit for service in Iraq and appointed KCB
- Major Thomas Robson McDermott, The Royal Tank Regiment
- Lieutenant Colonel James Andrew John Morris, Royal Marines, September 2009
- Major Marcus James Mudd, The Queen's Royal Lancers, March 2011
- Lieutenant Colonel Ewen Alexander Murchison MBE, Royal Marines, March 2012; MBE for previous service in Afghanistan
- Captain Jaimie McCoy Norman, Royal Marines, March 2008
- Major Nicholas Charles Laybourne Perry, The King's Royal Hussars, July 2008; later appointed MBE for further service in Afghanistan
- Brigadier Timothy Buchan Radford OBE, late The Light Infantry, March 2010; previously appointed MBE for service in Northern Ireland
- Lieutenant Colonel James Christopher Roddis, MBE, The Royal Regiment of Scotland
- Wing Commander Martin Elliott Sampson, Royal Air Force, September 2006
- Major Justin George Edward Stenhouse, The Queen's Dragoon Guards, September 2012
- Lieutenant Colonel Gerald Mark Strickland MBE, The Royal Gurkha Rifles, March 2011; awarded QCVS for previous service in Afghanistan
- Brigadier Jeremy Hywel Thomas, Royal Marines, July 2007
- Lieutenant Colonel Robert John Thomson MBE, The Rifles, March 2010; previously awarded US Bronze Star Medal for actions in Iraq
- Lieutenant Colonel Stuart John Craig Tootal OBE, The Parachute Regiment, December 2006
- Major Ian Alexander Jonathan Turner, Irish Guards, September 2011
- Lieutenant Colonel Charles Roland Vincent Walker, Grenadier Guards, September 2010
- Lieutenant Colonel Colin Richard James Weir MBE, The Royal Irish Regiment, September 2011

== Conspicuous Gallantry Cross ==
The Conspicuous Gallantry Cross (CGC) is the next level of award down from the Victoria Cross for gallantry in the face of the enemy.

- Captain Robin Edwin Geoffrey Bourne-Taylor, The Life Guards, September 2010
- Corporal Lee Brownson, The Rifles, September 2010 (killed in action)
- Acting Corporal Donald Peter Campbell, Corps of Royal Engineers, March 2008
- Staff Sergeant Scott Allan Couzens, The Parachute Regiment, September 2012
- Lieutenant Simon Timothy Cupples, The Mercian Regiment, March 2008
- Acting Serjeant Deacon Daniel Cutterham, The Rifles, March 2012
- Sergent Marcus James Recce HutchinsonHutch, Royal Marines, 4 October 2013
- Corporal Tony Kenneth Day, Royal Marines, October 2002 (not gazetted until March 2005)
- Sergeant Alan Gordon Dennis, The Mercian Regiment, March 2010
- Lieutenant Hugo James Edward Farmer, The Parachute Regiment, December 2006; later Mentioned in Despatches for further actions in Afghanistan
- Gunner Steven William Gadsby, Royal Regiment of Artillery, March 2010
- Sergeant Marc Kevin Giles, The Mercian Regiment, March 2010
- Captain James Alexander Glancy, Royal Marines, 22 March 2013
- Corporal Josh Edward Hayden Griffiths, Mercian Regiment, 4 October 2013
- Corporal Karl Anthony Hearne, The Parachute Regiment, October 2002 (not gazetted until March 2006)
- Private Graham Stuart Horn, The Parachute Regiment, September 2010
- Acting Captain Timothy Holden Illingworth, The Light Infantry, December 2006
- Marine Mark Anthony Jackson, Royal Marines, March 2011
- Acting Corporal Bradley Malone, Royal Marines, September 2009
- Lieutenant Luke Timothy John Mason, Yorkshire Regiment, 22 March 2013
- Corporal Robert William Kerr McClurg, The Royal Irish Regiment, March 2009
- Rifleman James Lee McKie, The Rifles, September 2010
- Captain Jeremy Mark Merchant, Royal Marines, October 2002 (not gazetted until March 2005); previously Mentioned in Despatches for actions in Northern Ireland
- Lance Corporal Simon George Moloney, Blues and Royals, 21 March 2014
- Serjeant Jaime Moncho, The Rifles, March 2010
- Marine Steven Nethery, Royal Marines, September 2009
- Lance Bombardier Gary Prout, Royal Regiment of Artillery, March 2010
- Acting Sergeant Dipprasad Pun, The Royal Gurkha Rifles, March 2011
- Lance Corporal of Horse Andrew Geoffrey Radford, The Life Guards, December 2006
- Private Edward Lawrence Sanders, The Parachute Regiment, October 2002 (not gazetted until March 2005)
- Lance Corporal Kyle Patrick Smith, The Mercian Regiment, March 2010
- Corporal Anthony Stazicker, Royal Marines, 21 March 2014
- Private Gareth David Steel, Parachute Regiment, 4 October 2013
- Corporal Seth Vincent Scott Stephens, Royal Marines, March 2011 (killed in action)
- Acting Sergeant Alwyn John Stevens, The Royal Irish Regiment, March 2009
- Corporal John Thomas Thompson, Royal Marines, July 2007; previously mentioned in Despatches for actions in Iraq
- Lance Corporal Jone Bruce Toge, The Royal Irish Regiment, March 2009
- Corporal Robert Turner, Royal Marines, September 2010
- Private Paul Darren Willmott, The Mercian Regiment, March 2008
- Corporal Simon Wright-Hider, Royal Marines, March 2012

== Royal Red Cross ==
The Royal Red Cross is awarded for distinguished nursing service. There are two classes: Members (RRC) and Associates (ARRC). Officers of the rank of lieutenant colonel and above will normally be admitted as Members; Membership is also awarded to those Associates providing a second period of service worthy of recognition.

RRC:

- Lieutenant Commander Alison Jayne Hofman, ARRC, Queen Alexandra's Royal Naval Nursing Service, September 2009
- Lieutenant Colonel Andrea Jane Lewis, Queen Alexandra’s Royal Army Nursing Corps, March 2013

ARRC:

- Captain Mark Cadman, Queen Alexandra's Royal Army Nursing Corps, Territorial Army, March 2009
- Leading Naval Nurse Laura Jane Fallon, Queen Alexandra’s Royal Naval Nursing Service, February 2015
- Lieutenant Frank Kelly, Queen Alexandra's Royal Naval Nursing Service, July 2007
- Lieutenant Colonel Judith Caroline Florence Madill, Queen Alexandra’s Royal Army Nursing Corps, (Army Reserve), 4 October 2013
- Major Kerry Jane McFadden-Newman, Queen Alexandra’s Royal Army Nursing Corps, March 2014
- Captain Graham John McPhee, Queen Alexandra’s Royal Army Nursing Corps, 4 October 2013
- Captain Catherine McWilliam, Queen Alexandra's Royal Army Nursing Corps, December 2006
- Squadron Leader Sonia Margaret Phythian, Princess Mary's Royal Air Force Nursing Service, July 2007
- Acting Major Janet Mary Pilgrim, Queen Alexandra's Royal Army Nursing Corps, April 2003; previously awarded QCVS for service in Kosovo / Macedonia, later awarded RRC for service in Iraq
- Major Sharon Ann Stewart, Queen Alexandra's Royal Army Nursing Corps, Territorial Army, September 2011
- Squadron Leader Charlotte Joanne Thompson-Edgar, Princess Mary’s Royal Air Force Nursing Service, February 2015
- Major Ruth Truscott, Queen Alexandra's Royal Army Nursing Corps, March 2011
- Acting Major Harry Karl Wallace, Queen Alexandra’s Royal Army Nursing Corps, July 2015
- Captain Gail Lesley Whittle, Queen Alexandra's Royal Army Nursing Corps, March 2010

== Military Cross ==
The Military Cross (MC) is the third-level medal awarded for gallantry in the face of the enemy on land.

Bar to MC:

- Corporal John Matthew Watson MC, Royal Marines, 4 October 2013; original award for service in Afghanistan in 2011

=== Royal Navy ===
- Marine Samuel Giles William Alexander, Royal Marines, September 2009; later killed in action in Afghanistan
- Lieutenant Jack Anrude, Royal Marines, March 2011
- Marine Liam Peter Armstrong, Royal Marines, April 2003
- Corporal John Ballance, Royal Marines, September 2009
- Corporal Richard Bateman, Royal Marines, September 2009
- Marine Matthew Bispham, Royal Marines, July 2007
- Colour Sergeant Brian Bridger, Royal Marines, March 2011
- Colour Sergeant Stuart Anthony Brown, Royal Marines, October 2002 (not gazetted until September 2003)
- Marine Craig Andrew Buchanan, Royal Marines, 4 October 2013
- Acting Lance Corporal Stephen Burns, Royal Marines, March 2009
- Major Richard John Cantrill, Royal Marines, September 2009
- Captain Alistair Scott Carns, Royal Marines, September 2011; Mentioned in Despatches for previous actions in Afghanistan
- Marine Eroni Sikavou Bulabalavu Cinavilakeba, Royal Marines, July 2008
- Marine Daniel Claricoates, Royal Marines, July 2007
- Sergeant Noel Gerard Connolly, Royal Marines, September 2009
- Corporal Michael Cowe, Royal Marines, July 2007
- Marine Ian Paul Danby, Royal Marines, July 2007
- Corporal Christopher Terrence Downey, Royal Marines, September 2012
- Marine Daniel Fisher, Royal Marines, July 2007
- Sergeant Daniel Alan Fisher, Royal Marines, March 2008
- Sergeant Shane David Fisher, Royal Marines, March 2010
- Corporal Alan Hewett, Royal Marines, July 2007
- Colour Sergeant Hefin Jones, Royal Marines, July 2007
- Marine Mkhuseli Jones, Royal Marines, July 2008
- Sergeant Jason Layton, Royal Marines, July 2007
- Sergeant Andrew Leaver, Royal Marines, September 2009
- Marine Ross Lewis, Royal Marines, July 2015
- Corporal Wayne Robert Lloyd, Royal Marines, July 2008
- Marine Lewis Lockwood, Royal Marines, March 2011
- Sergeant Samuel Joseph McCormick, Royal Marines, 4 October 2013
- Sergeant Andrew Peter Miller, Royal Marines, July 2007
- Sergeant David Albert Montgomery, Royal Marines, July 2007
- Major Adrian Morley, Royal Marines, July 2008
- Corporal Billy George Murphy, Royal Marines, March 2011
- Able Seaman Class 1 Medical Assistant Kate Louise Nesbitt, Royal Navy, September 2009; second female award, after Michelle Norris; first in the Royal Navy
- Sergeant Paul Andrew Norris, Royal Marines, July 2008; previously awarded QCB for "services at sea", later appointed MBE for further service in Afghanistan
- Medical Assistant Liam Matthew O'Grady, Royal Navy, March 2012
- Captain Mark O’Sullivan, Royal Marines, July 2015
- Sergeant Andrew David Pearson, Royal Marines, July 2007
- Lance Corporal Hamish Robertson Hame Renton, Royal Marines, September 2012
- Acting Lance Corporal Harry Thomas Robinson, Royal Marines, 4 October 2013
- Major Nigel John Powell Somerville MBE, Royal Marines, September 2010; MBE for previous service in Afghanistan; also Mentioned in Despatches for previous actions in Afghanistan
- Sergeant Dean Charles Sykes, Royal Marines, July 2008
- Warrant Officer Class 2 Matthew Richard Tomlinson CGC, Royal Marines, March 2010; CGC for actions in Iraq
- Sergeant Steven Edmond Veale, Royal Marines, March 2008
- Corporal Paul Anthony Vice, Royal Marines, March 2012
- Marine John Matthew Watson, Royal Marines, September 2011
- Corporal Christopher Steven Wetton, Royal Marines, July 2008
- Corporal Simon Willey, Royal Marines, July 2007
- Marine Mark George Williams, Royal Marines, March 2012
- Acting Sergeant Richard Edward Wiseman, Royal Marines, September 2010
- Marine Richard Reginald Withers, Royal Marines, July 2008
- Marine Gerard Wood, Royal Marines, March 2013

=== Army ===
==== Cavalry / Artillery ====
- Major Robert Michael Armstrong, Royal Regiment of Artillery, March 2009. This award was withdrawn on 10 October 2014.
- Corporal Oliver David Bainbridge, The Royal Dragoon Guards, 4 October 2013
- Captain Paul Nathaniel Brenig Britton, Royal Regiment of Artillery, July 2008
- Bombardier Mark David Carpenter, Royal Regiment of Artillery, March 2012
- Corporal of Horse Michael John Flynn CGC, The Blues and Royals, December 2006; CGC for actions in Iraq
- Lance Bombardier Michael Ronald Frew, Royal Regiment of Artillery, March 2008
- Staff Corporal Shaun Keith Fry, The Life Guards, December 2006
- Bombardier Paul Mitchell Greenwood, Royal Regiment of Artillery, March 2008
- Lieutenant Tresham Dames Rowley Gregg, The Light Dragoons, March 2010
- Gunner Grant Michael Guy, Royal Regiment of Artillery, September 2009
- Captain William Andrew Hall, Royal Regiment of Artillery, February 2015
- Lance Bombardier Richard David Jennings, Royal Regiment of Artillery, July 2007
- Corporal Keith Mitchell, Royal Scots Dragoon Guards, March 2012
- Captain Alexander Ryland Pickthall, The Life Guards, March 2014
- Acting Corporal Matthew James Stenton, Royal Dragoon Guards, March 2011 (killed in action)
- Major Angus Myles Arthur Tilney, The King’s Royal Hussars, February 2015
- Captain Patrick James Williams, The Blues and Royals, December 2006
- Corporal Christopher Balmforth, Queen's Royal Hussars (Queen's Own & Royal Irish), March 2005, for actions in Iraq.

==== Infantry ====
- Lieutenant James Philip Adamson, The Royal Regiment of Scotland, September 2009; Mentioned in Despatches for previous actions in Afghanistan
- Corporal Craig Adkin, The Mercian Regiment, March 2010
- Lance Corporal Levi David Ashby, The Royal Anglian Regiment, March 2008
- Major Michael Patrick Aston, The Royal Anglian Regiment, March 2008
- Sergeant Paul Edward Baines, Coldstream Guards, September 2010
- Second Lieutenant Alexander Brampton Charles Barclay, Royal Regiment of Scotland, March 2009
- Captain Douglas Ricardo Beattie, The Royal Irish Regiment, December 2006; previously awarded QCB for actions in Iraq
- Colour Sergeant Michael Bell, The Parachute Regiment, October 2002 (not gazetted until September 2003)
- Major Dominic Stead James Biddick MBE, The Royal Anglian Regiment, March 2008; MBE for service in Northern Ireland
- Staff Sergeant Paul Jonathon Bilingham, The Parachute Regiment, February 2015
- Lieutenant William Jordan Campbell Boreham, The Duke of Lancaster’s Regiment, 4 October 2013
- Corporal Robert Boswell, The Parachute Regiment, March 2013
- Acting Sergeant Craig Anthony Brelsford, The Mercian Regiment, March 2008 (killed in action)
- Major Geoffrey Richard Brocklehurst, The Royal Regiment of Scotland, March 2014
- Captain Edward Robert Brown, The Mercian Regiment, March 2010
- Major Jo Butterfill, The Royal Regiment of Fusiliers, March 2010
- Staff Sergeant Russell Craig Byrne, The Parachute Regiment, 4 October 2013
- Major Nicholas George Calder, The Royal Regiment of Scotland, March 2009; previously awarded QCVS for service in Northern Ireland
- Corporal Steven Graham Childs, The Rifles, March 2010
- Corporal Richard Clark, The Royal Regiment of Scotland, March 2010
- Colour Sergeant Simon Peter Clark, The Parachute Regiment, July 2015
- Acting Sergeant John Mathew Cockburn, The Yorkshire Regiment, July 2008
- Private Luke Cole, The Mercian Regiment, Territorial Army, March 2008
- Sergeant Luke Alexander Cole, The Parachute Regiment, September 2011
- Private Paul James Coleman, The Parachute Regiment, March 2009
- Corporal James Stephen Cooke, Irish Guards, March 2009
- Captain Iain Robin Curren, The Royal Regiment of Scotland, September 2011
- Second Lieutenant Oliver Dale, The Parachute Regiment, December 2006
- Lieutenant Douglas Anthony Keith Dalzell, Coldstream Guards, September 2010 (killed in action)
- Major Martin Paul David, Grenadier Guards, March 2008
- Colour Sergeant Scott Rae McKenzie Davidson, The Parachute Regiment, October 2002 (not gazetted until September 2003)
- Acting Serjeant James Andrew Davies, The Rifles, September 2012
- Major Adam Guy Dawson, The Parachute Regiment, March 2009
- Private Scott Robert Docherty, The Parachute Regiment, July 2008
- Captain Michael Olaf Chetwynd Dobbin, Grenadier Guards, March 2013
- Corporal Johannes Jacobus Fourie, The Parachute Regiment, September 2011
- Private Scott Lachlan Fraser, The Parachute Regiment, March 2009
- Corporal Ricky Paul Furgusson, The Rifles, September 2010
- Sergeant Glen William John Gardiner, The Parachute Regiment, September 2011
- Corporal Stuart James Giles, The Parachute Regiment, December 2006
- Major Neil Darren Grant, The Mercian Regiment, March 2010
- Captain Xavier Luke Griffin, The Rifles, Territorial Army, September 2009
- Rifleman Bhimbahadur Gurung, The Royal Gurkha Rifles, July 2008
- Rifleman Tuljung Gurung, The Royal Gurkha Rifles, 4 October 2013
- Corporal Alexander William Guy, The Royal Anglian Regiment, (killed in action), March 2013
- Major Karl Christian Hickman, The Rifles, March 2010; previously Mentioned in Despatches for actions in Iraq
- Captain David Charles Hicks, The Royal Anglian Regiment, March 2008 (killed in action)
- Fusilier Damion Mark Hields, The Royal Welsh, March 2008
- Lieutenant Luke Arthur James Higginson, The Parachute Regiment, September 2011
- Lieutenant William James Archie Hignett, The Rifles, March 2010
- Sergeant Ashley Robert Hill, Royal Anglian Regiment, September 2010
- Private Aaron Stuart Holmes, The Mercian Regiment, March 2008
- Lance Corporal Stuart James Howell, The Rifles, March 2012
- Warrant Officer Class 1 Patrick Hyde, The Rifles, March 2014
- Lance Corporal Karl Wayne Jackson, The Parachute Regiment, December 2006
- Private Bryan Johnson, The Royal Regiment of Scotland, September 2011
- Corporal Sean Lee Jones, The Princess of Wales's Royal Regiment, September 2012
- Lance Corporal Lawrence Mark Craig Kayser, The Royal Anglian Regiment, March 2013
- Lance Corporal Sean Michael Keenan, The Rifles, September 2009
- Warrant Officer Class 2 Benjamin Llewellyn Kelly, The Princess of Wales's Royal Regiment, September 2009; previously Mentioned in Despatches for actions in Iraq
- Private Alexander Robert Kennedy, The Mercian Regiment, March 2010
- Sergeant Peter Keogh, The Royal Irish Regiment, September 2011
- Warrant Officer Class 2 Gavin Charles Kimberlin, The Mercian Regiment, March 2008
- Rifleman Harry Lanceley, The Rifles, September 2010
- Major Russell David Lewis, The Parachute Regiment, March 2009
- Sergeant Kajiman Limbu, The Royal Gurkha Rifles, September 2004
- Rifleman Sunil Limbu, Royal Gurkha Rifles, March 2011
- Major Jason Alexis Little, The Yorkshire Regiment, July 2008
- Corporal Michael Lockett, The Mercian Regiment, March 2008 later killed in action in Afghanistan
- Lieutenant Colin William Lunn, Yorkshire Regiment, September 2010
- Major Angus Donald MacGillivray, Royal Regiment of Scotland, September 2010
- Major James Rowland Martin, Princess of Wales's Royal Regiment, March 2011
- Sergeant Stephen McConnell, The Royal Irish Regiment, March 2009
- Major John Stuart McDonald, The Parachute Regiment, March 2009; previously awarded US Bronze Star Medal for actions in Iraq
- Second Lieutenant Paul David McFarland, The Royal Irish Regiment, September 2011
- Private Peter McKinley, The Parachute Regiment, December 2006
- Lance Corporal Liam Kane McNulty, The Rifles, September 2012
- Corporal William Joseph Mills, The Rifles, March 2014
- Acting Corporal Darragh Rory Miskella, The Parachute Regiment, September 2011
- Lance Corporal Stephen Daniel Monkhouse, Scots Guards, March 2011 (killed in action)
- Corporal Robert William Moore, The Royal Anglian Regiment, March 2008
- Corporal Nicholas James Alexander Noakes, The Parachute Regiment, Territorial Army, March 2009
- Captain Richard Alexander Oakes, The Mercian Regiment, (Territorial Army), March 2013
- Staff Sergeant Rory Patrick George O’Connor, The Parachute Regiment, March 2013
- Ranger Alan William Owens, The Royal Irish Regiment, March 2009
- Lance Corporal Alexander Luke Perry, The Parachute Regiment, March 2012
- Lieutenant Alexander John Phillips, The Royal Regiment of Scotland, March 2010
- Major Paul Ralph Gareth Pitchfork, The Royal Gurkha Rifles, July 2008
- Private Alfred Owen James Pope, The Parachute Regiment, September 2011
- Acting Serjeant Mark John Powis, The Rifles, September 2009
- Lance Corporal Ratu Apenisa Qalitakivuna, The Royal Irish Regiment, September 2011
- Warrant Officer Class 2 Terry Rafferty, The Rifles, September 2012
- Lance Corporal Gajendra Rai, The Royal Gurkha Rifles, September 2009
- Captain Graham David Bradley Rainey, The Royal Irish Regiment, March 2009
- Lance Corporal Marc Anthony Reader, Coldstream Guards, September 2010
- Lance Corporal Alan Redford, Mercian Regiment, March 2011
- Major Daniel Reeve, The Rifles, September 2011
- Corporal Christopher Sean Reynolds, The Royal Regiment of Scotland, March 2010
- Major Colin Nicholas Risso, Royal Gibraltar Regiment, September 2005
- Lance Corporal Oliver Scott Ruecker, The Royal Anglian Regiment, March 2008
- Corporal George Finau Sale, The Royal Welsh, September 2010
- Lieutenant John Philip Henri Scarlett, Coldstream Guards, March 2013
- Corporal Craig Richard Sharp, The Royal Regiment of Scotland, March 2010
- Lieutenant Craig Angus Shephard, Grenadier Guards, September 2010
- Lance Corporal Alexander James Smith, Parachute Regiment, March 2010
- Sergeant Torben Erik George Sorensen, The Princess of Wales's Royal Regiment, September 2009
- Lance Corporal Colin James Spooner, The Princess of Wales's Royal Regiment, September 2009
- Staff Sergeant Jason Alexander Stiff, The Parachute Regiment
- Lance Sergeant Markus Strydom, Grenadier Guards, March 2013
- Lance Sergeant Adam Charles Swift, Coldstream Guards, September 2010
- Lance Corporal Mohansingh Tangnami, The Royal Gurkha Rifles, July 2008
- Corporal Carl Taylor, The Mercian Regiment, March 2012
- Lance Corporal Agnish Thapa, The Royal Gurkha Rifles, July 2008
- Warrant Officer Class 2 Simon Nicholas Thompson, The Rifles, March 2010
- Major Edward Eaton Calthrop Thorne, The Royal Anglian Regiment, October 2002 (not gazetted until September 2003)
- Major Giles Matthew Timms, The Parachute Regiment, December 2006; previously awarded QCVS for service in Northern Ireland
- Lance Sergeant Matthew Philip Turrall, Irish Guards, March 2010
- Corporal James Richard Lawrence Walker, The Parachute Regiment, March 2014
- Corporal Mark Ward, The Mercian Regiment, March 2011
- Acting Corporal Andrew Wardle, The Yorkshire Regiment, September 2010
- Lance Corporal James Gerard White, The Parachute Regiment, March 2011
- Corporal Shaun Whitehead, The Royal Regiment of Scotland, March 2009
- Corporal David Thomas Williams, The Royal Welsh, September 2010
- Major Richard James Elton Williams MBE, The Parachute Regiment, October 2002 (not gazetted until September 2003); MBE for service in former Yugoslavia; previously awarded QCVS "for service in the field"
- Private Mark James Wilson, The Parachute Regiment, December 2006
- Rifleman Matthew James Wilson, The Rifles, September 2012
- Corporal Martin James Windmill, The Parachute Regiment, September 2011

==== Support Corps ====
- Acting Captain Russell Archer, Corps of Royal Engineers, March 2009
- Staff Sergeant Keith John Armatage, Army Air Corps, July 2007
- Acting Corporal James Andrew Bedford, Corps of Royal Engineers, March 2011
- Lance Corporal Sarah Louise Bushbye, Royal Army Medical Corps, September 2010
- Lance Corporal Daniel John Fletcher, Royal Army Medical Corps, September 2010
- Private Wesley Robert Masters, Royal Army Medical Corps, March 2014
- Corporal Paul Edward Mather, Army Air Corps, March 2010
- Warrant Officer Class 2 James Louis Palmer, The Royal Logistic Corps, September 2011
- Major Douglas Fraser Reid, Royal Army Medical Corps, July 2008
- Captain David Charles Rigg, Corps of Royal Engineers, July 2007
- Warrant Officer Class 1 Ed Macy, Army Air Corps, July 2007
- Major Ian David Scattergood, The Royal Logistic Corps, July 2008
- Captain Sean Alan Scott, The Royal Logistic Corps, March 2011
- Lance Corporal Stephen Andrew Shaw, Royal Army Medical Corps, March 2013
- Corporal Richard Steven Street, Corps of Royal Electrical and Mechanical Engineers, July 2008
- Lance Corporal Kylie Elizabeth Watson, Royal Army Medical Corps, March 2011
- Staff Sergeant Gareth David Wood, The Royal Logistic Corps, September 2010

=== Royal Air Force ===
- Flight Lieutenant Matthew Kenneth Carter, Royal Air Force Regiment (attached, 3rd battalion the Parachute Regiment Battlegroup), December 2006
- Sergeant Roy Geddes, Royal Air Force, March 2013

== Distinguished Flying Cross ==
The Distinguished Flying Cross (DFC) is the third-level medal awarded for gallantry in the face of the enemy in the air.

Second Bar to DFC:

- Wing Commander Philip Jeremy Robinson DFC*, Royal Air Force, July 2008; original award for previous actions in Afghanistan (dated 2002, not gazetted until 2003, recorded below), first bar for actions in Iraq (dated 2003, not gazetted until 2006)

DFC:

- Flight Lieutenant Michael Anderson, Royal Air Force, September 2011
- Captain Nicholas Paul Barton, Army Air Corps, July 2007
- Lieutenant Nichol James Emslie Benzie, Royal Navy, July 2008; Mentioned in Despatches for previous actions in Afghanistan
- Flight Lieutenant Daniel Hunter Cullen, Royal Air Force, March 2012
- Flight Lieutenant Alexander Marc Duncan, Royal Air Force, March 2009; awarded AFC for later actions in Afghanistan (recorded below)
- Flight Lieutenant Ian Anthony Fortune, Royal Air Force, September 2010
- Squadron Leader John Gordon Gladston MBE, Royal Air Force, October 2002 (not gazetted until September 2003); MBE for service in Sierra Leone (also not gazetted until September 2003)
- Flight Lieutenant Christopher Gordon, Royal Air Force, March 2013
- Major Mark Christopher Hammond, Royal Marines, December 2006; previously awarded QCVS for service in Iraq
- Flying Officer Christopher Michael Hasler, Royal Air Force, December 2006
- Flight Lieutenant Marc Alan Heal, Royal Air Force, March 2010
- Flight Lieutenant Iain David Hopcroft, Royal Air Force, October 2002 (not gazetted until September 2003)
- Wing Commander Kenneth Andrew Lewis, Royal Air Force, March 2008
- Flight Lieutenant Charles Peter Lockyear, Royal Air Force, March 2014
- Squadron Leader John Finbar Monahan, Royal Air Force, December 2006
- Flight Lieutenant Laura Alice Hilary Nicholson, Royal Air Force, February 2015
- Flight Lieutenant Andrew Michael Nethaway, Royal Air Force, September 2010
- Warrant Officer Class 1 Darren Gareth O'Malley, Army Air Corps, July 2007
- Flight Lieutenant Nicholas James Paton, Royal Air Force, March 2009
- Flight Lieutenant Timothy Richard Pollard, Royal Air Force, September 2010
- Flight Lieutenant Matthew David Roberts, Royal Air Force, March 2011
- Flight Lieutenant Philip Jeremy Robinson, Royal Air Force, October 2002 (not gazetted until September 2003); subsequently awarded two bars, first for actions in Iraq (dated 2003, not gazetted until 2006), second for further actions in Afghanistan (recorded above)
- Lieutenant Commander Gavin Ian Simmonite, Royal Navy, September 2009
- Flight Lieutenant Jonathan Arvind Singh, Royal Air Force, March 2012
- Flight Lieutenant Matthew James Patrick Springford, Royal Air Force, September 2011
- Flight Lieutenant Timothy Edward Trott, Royal Air Force, 4 October 2013
- Flight Lieutenant Adam Boyd Wardrope, Royal Air Force, March 2008
- Flight Lieutenant Craig Thomas Wilson, Royal Air Force, December 2006
- Flight Lieutenant Gerald Edward Peter Wyatt, Royal Air Force, September 2012

== Air Force Cross ==
The Air Force Cross (AFC) is also a third-level award for gallantry in the air, awarded for actions whilst not in active operations against the enemy.

- Flight Lieutenant Stephen Douglas Badham, Royal Air Force, March 2011
- Flight Lieutenant Edward Thomas Berwick, Royal Air Force, February 2015
- Squadron Leader John David Butler, Royal Air Force, July 2008
- Flight Lieutenant James Patrick Michael Donovan, Royal Air Force, March 2011
- Flight Lieutenant Alexander Marc Duncan DFC, Royal Air Force, September 2011; DFC for previous actions in Afghanistan (recorded above)
- Captain Steven John Paul Jones, Army Air Corps, September 2011
- Flight Lieutenant David Kevin Stead, Royal Air Force, April 2003 (not gazetted until September 2005, following death in action)
- Flight Lieutenant Richard Ian Whipp, Royal Air Force, April 2003 (not gazetted until September 2005); previously Mentioned in Despatches for actions in Sierra Leone (not gazetted until 2003)

== George Medal ==
The George Medal (GM) is the next level below the George Cross for bravery not in the face of the enemy.

Bar to GM:

- Warrant Officer Class 2 Gary John O'Donnell GM, The Royal Logistic Corps (killed in action), March 2009; original award for actions in Iraq

GM:

- Fusilier Andrew Lee Barlow, The Royal Regiment of Fusiliers, July 2007
- Private Martin Simon George Bell, The Parachute Regiment (killed in action), September 2011
- Sergeant Kevin Charles Carter, Royal Marines, October 2002 (not gazetted until March 2005); later awarded QCVS for "services at sea"
- Staff Sergeant Stuart Walter Dickson, The Royal Logistic Corps, March 2009
- Lance Corporal Paul Hartley, Royal Army Medical Corps, December 2006
- Rifleman Paul Raymond Jacobs, The Rifles, March 2010
- Staff Sergeant Karl John Fairfax Ley, The Royal Logistic Corps, September 2010
- Staff Sergeant Brett George Linley, The Royal Logistic Corps (killed in action), March 2011
- Warrant Officer Class 1 Andreas Oliver Peat, The Royal Logistic Corps, 4 October 2013
- Marine Ryan Shelley, Royal Marines, March 2011
- Captain Daniel Marc Shepherd, The Royal Logistic Corps (killed in action), March 2010
- Colour Sergeant Mark Jonathan Skipp, The Parachute Regiment, October 2002 (not gazetted until March 2005)

== Queen's Gallantry Medal ==
The Queen's Gallantry Medal (QGM) is the third-level medal awarded for bravery not in the face of the enemy.

- Sergeant David Paul Acarnley, The Royal Logistic Corps, March 2013
- Warrant Officer Stephen Charles Bowden, Royal Air Force, March 2011
- Private Callum John Brotherston, The Royal Regiment of Scotland, September 2010
- Warrant Officer Class 2 Peter John Burney, The Rifles, March 2010
- Corporal Edward Samual Charles Davis, Royal Army Veterinary Corps, 4 October 2013
- Captain James Peter Fidell, The Royal Logistic Corps, March 2012
- Captain Liam Charles Fitzgerald-Finch, The Royal Logistic Corps, March 2009
- Sapper Matthew Jon Garey, Corps of Royal Engineers, September 2012
- Warrant Officer Class 2 Colin Robert George Grant, The Royal Logistic Corps, September 2009
- Corporal James Halpin, Corps of Royal Engineers, March 2012
- Corporal John Alexander Hardman, The Yorkshire Regiment, September 2010
- Private Daniel James Hellings, The Mercian Regiment, March 2011
- Captain Michael Robert John Kennedy, Corps of Royal Engineers, March 2014
- Acting Warrant Officer Class 2 John Gareth Lester, The Royal Logistic Corps, September 2009
- Major Matthew Cameron Long, The Royal Logistic Corps, 4 October 2013
- Chief Technician David John Lowe, Royal Air Force, September 2011
- Lance Corporal Julie Elizabeth May, Royal Army Medical Corps, September 2010; later Mentioned in Despatches for further actions in Afghanistan
- Staff Sergeant James Alexander McCormick, Corps of Royal Engineers, March 2009
- Staff Sergeant William Ernest McFarland, The Royal Logistic Corps, March 2011
- Captain Graeme McIntosh, Royal Regiment of Artillery, July 2007
- Private Luke Cula Nadriva, The Royal Anglian Regiment, March 2008
- Corporal Robert Alan Nealey, The Royal Logistic Corps, September 2010
- Lieutenant Commander Alan Neil Laurence Michael Nekrews, Royal Navy, March 2013
- Corporal William Glyndwr Owen, The Parachute Regiment, March 2009
- Captain Wayne Edward James Owers, The Royal Logistic Corps, March 2010; previously awarded QCVS for service in Iraq
- Corporal Stuart Henry Pearson, The Parachute Regiment, December 2006
- Rifleman Ross David Robinson, The Rifles, September 2010 (died prior to award)
- Captain Timothy Peter Walker Rushmere, Royal Regiment of Artillery, July 2007
- Craftsman Geoffrey John Salt, Corps of Royal Electrical and Mechanical Engineers, March 2013
- Staff Sergeant Anthony David Spamer, Corps of Royal Engineers, September 2009
- Captain Benedict Lincoln Stephens, The Mercian Regiment, March 2011
- Captain Vincent Michael Strafford, The Royal Logistic Corps, July 2007; bar awarded for actions in Iraq
- Sergeant John Arthur Swithenbank, The Yorkshire Regiment, September 2010
- Rifleman Benjamin John Taylor, The Mercian Regiment, (Army Reserve), 4 October 2013
- Rifleman Reece William Stevenson Terry, The Rifles, September 2010
- Corporal Carl Peter Thomas, The Rifles, March 2010
- Lance Corporal David James Timmins, The Royal Logistic Corps, March 2010
- Signaller Sebastian Edward Wyton-De Lisle, Royal Corps of Signals, September 2011

== See also ==
- British honours system
- List of British gallantry awards for the Iraq War
