= Michael Lockett =

British Army soldier

- Born: Michael Christopher Lockett; 11 June 1980; Aldershot, Hampshire, England
- Died: 21 September 2009 (aged 29); Helmand Province, Afghanistan
- Burial place: Linn Cemetery, Glasgow, Scotland
- Military career
- Allegiance: United Kingdom
- Branch: British Army
- Service years: 1996-2009
- Rank: Sergeant
- Nickname: Locky
- Service number: 25061301
- Units: Worcestershire and Sherwood Foresters Regiment; Mercian Regiment
- Awards: Military Cross

Sergeant Michael Christopher Lockett MC (11 June 1980 – 21 September 2009) was a British soldier, killed in action in Afghanistan aged 29. In June 2008 Lockett was presented with the Military Cross by Queen Elizabeth II, for his efforts in an attempt to recover the bodies of Pte. Johan Botha and Sgt. Craig Brelsford, as well as successfully rescuing four other injured soldiers. In September 2009, an improvised explosive device which he was investigating exploded, injuring Lockett and two other soldiers. Lockett died before he reached hospital. He is the first soldier to die on operations who has been awarded the Military Cross since World War II.

== Early life ==
Lockett studied at Longcroft School in Beverley, in 1996, he joined the 1st Battalion of the Worcestershire and Sherwood Foresters Regiment stationed at Tidworth Camp, Wiltshire and spent the majority of his military career as a machine gunner. He was a qualified Jungle Warfare and Military Tracking Instructor.

== Military Cross ==
While fighting in Afghanistan during Operation Herrick VI in September 2007, Lockett, then a corporal, and the rest of his unit, were commanded to penetrate enemy lines, and ruin their posts. The soldiers dubbed the mission 'Operation Certain Death', but carried it out nonetheless. However, they were ambushed by Taliban troops. The ambush caused the death of Private Johan Botha and Sergeant Craig Brelsford, as well as inflicting injuries on four other soldiers. Michael led the remaining soldiers in an attempt to retrieve the bodies, and rescue the four injured soldiers. For his "leadership, command, control and supreme courage", Lockett was awarded the Military Cross on 7 March 2008, which he later received from Queen Elizabeth II.

== Death ==
At the time of his death on 21 September 2009, Lockett was working with the Afghan National Army, at Patrol Base Sandford. He had volunteered to stay at the base because new soldiers were due to arrive, and he wanted to ensure they knew as much about the local area as possible. He was investigating an improvised explosive device, when it detonated, killing him, and injuring two nearby soldiers. As well as being the 217th British soldier to die in Afghanistan since October 2001, he is the first soldier who has been awarded the Military Cross to later die there.

== Memorial and tribute ==
Lockett's body was flown back to Britain on 29 September, where hundreds filled the streets to pay tribute to him. Lockett's school friends Kate Atkinson, Rochelle Booth, Kelly Jackson and Rebecca Knowles started up The Lockett Fund, which has raised hundreds of pounds for the charity Help for Heroes.

== Personal life ==
Lockett, known as "Locky" to his comrades, was the father of three and was in a relationship with Belinda English.

== See also ==
- List of British gallantry awards for the War in Afghanistan
