= Stuart Brown =

Stuart Brown may refer to:

- Stuart Brown (sidecarcross rider), British sidecarcross rider
- Stuart Brown (artist), British military artist
