= House! =

- Directed by: Julian Kemp
- Written by: Eric Styles; Jason Sutton
- Produced by: Michael Kelk
- Starring: Kelly Macdonald; Freddie Jones; Miriam Margolyes; Jason Hughes
- Cinematography: Kjell Vassdal
- Edited by: Jonathan Rudd
- Music by: Mark Thomas
- Production companies: CF1 Cyf; Wire Films
- Distributed by: Pathé Distribution
- Release date: 5 May 2000
- Running time: 90 minutes
- Country: United Kingdom
- Language: English

House! is a 2000 British comedy film written by Eric Styles and Jason Sutton and directed by Julian Kemp. The film stars Kelly Macdonald, Freddie Jones, Miriam Margolyes and Jason Hughes.

== Plot ==
The aging "La Scala" bingo hall is administered by Welsh-Italian Giovanni Anzani (Freddie Jones). In its heyday, it was the United Kingdom's biggest bingo hall, but its glory days are gone... and though the facility is run-down, the staff is loyal. Gavin (Jason Hughes) is the cheeky bingo caller. When a large international conglomerate announces they are about to open a huge family entertainment center nearby, promising competition through large payouts for their own bingo competitions, Linda (Kelly Macdonald) comes to the aid of the La Scala using her psychic gift.

== Cast ==
- Kelly Macdonald as Linda
- Freddie Jones as Mr. Anzani
- Miriam Margolyes as Beth
- Jason Hughes as Gavin
- Danny Roberts as Andy

== Reception ==
Derek Elley of Variety called House! an "Ealing-style light comedy", writing that the film was "helmed with impressive technical finesse" by director Julian Kemp" and "propelled by a knockout performance from Kelly Macdonald". Praising Jason Sutton's script, he wrote "none of this would have worked if the characters were simply cutouts and the thesps just mugging along in colorful accents. But Sutton's script, which also makes room for a variety of smaller roles, allows the protags to grow and isn't, as becomes clear later on, simply about winning."

Angus Wolfe Murray of Eye for Film wrote that in "the British tradition of little-things-mean-a-lot, House! fits like chips with fish," and that the film "has the feel good factor in spades." He closes by admiring Sutton's writing and Macdonald's performance.

eFilmCritic.com wrote that the film began with a "classic Tarantino pastiche" but became "soon obvious that this isn't your typical lottery funded mishap", noting that director Kemp managed to "inject a sense of life and excitement into the dullest of premises". They summarized by offering that the film was "definitely quirky, and no-ones idea of a mainstream hit, this film has a bit of magic about it."
