= Battle of Al Waki Market =

- Part of the Iraq War
Date	7 August 2007
Location	Al Waki Market, Basra, Iraq
Result	British victory

Belligerents
United Kingdom	Iraqi insurgents

Strength
Royal Air Force: No. 1 Squadron Royal Air Force Regiment B Flight	50 insurgents

Casualties and losses
(United Kingdom) 1 killed	16 killed

The Battle of Al Waki Market took place in August 2007 in Al Waki Market in Basra, Iraq, between No. 1 Squadron RAF Regiment and approximately 50 members of the Iraqi insurgency. It is notable as the battle for which the first Military Cross was awarded to an airman of the Royal Air Force.

== The battle ==
On the 7 August 2007, elements of No. 1 Squadron Royal Air Force Regiment B Flight were on foot patrol north of Basra Air Station. The intent of the patrol was to deter attacks on the air station and to reassure the local population. As they moved through Al Waki market the civilian population suddenly dispersed and the area went quiet. At the inquest into Leading Aircraftman (LAC) Beard's death, the section commander, Sergeant Robert Williams said that "..It all changed in a matter of seconds; the gunshots started and they opened fire on us from our left hand side."

The flight tried to take cover behind some buildings, but then people began firing at them from the rooftops. Corporal David Hayden who was also on the patrol said "It was as if everybody out there that day decided 'let's just have a go at them'. It was coming from all directions." The battle lasted for nearly 90 minutes with a heavy concentration of fire for 30 minutes. at one point the Gunner on a WIMK Was shot in the chest, only stopped by his ballistic vest, He was knocked off the WMIK. However he got back on the vehicle and continued firing. An RAF doctor was able to render aid to the wounded man. Enemy forces were estimated at 50 with at least 16 of the insurgents being killed by the RAF Regiment. Besides the many insurgent deaths, LAC Beard was also killed. Corporal David Hayden carried Beard over 200 metres (660 ft) under enemy fire to medical aid whilst he was injured, however, Beard died of his wounds, becoming the 166th British casualty of the War in Iraq. For his actions, Corporal Hayden became the first airman of the RAF to be awarded the Military Cross.

== Painting ==
The battle is the subject of a painting by Stuart Brown, commissioned by the RAF Regiment. Copies of the painting are on display in several military buildings around the United Kingdom.
