= Stuart Brown (artist) =

British artist

- Education: Southampton Institute, Hampshire
- Known for: Military oil paintings
- Website: Official website

Stuart Brown is a British military artist, frequently commissioned to paint aviation and military subjects. Some of his original paintings are held in the collections of British Armed Forces.

His works, completed in oil, have included the moment private Michelle Norris carried out life saving first aid to her wounded colleague in 2006 during the Iraq War, the painting What Matters Most, depicting a field hospital in Sierra Leone during the 2014 Ebola epidemic, and the painting In Safe Hands showing a casualty and the Medical Emergency Response Team in action in a CH-47 Chinook in Afghanistan.

== Biography ==
Stuart Brown studied illustration at Southampton Institute in Hampshire. He is frequently commissioned to paint aviation and military subjects and some of his original paintings are held in the collections of British Armed Forces. In 1995 he founded his own print publishing company, Skipper Press.

== Works ==
Brown captured in oil, the moment that teenager Combat Medical Technician private Michelle Norris carried out life saving first aid to wounded Colour Sergeant Ian Page in 2006 during the Iraq War. Despite continuous fire, Norris had jumped out of her Warrior Patrol vehicle to rescue the vehicle commander, who had been shot in the face. He illustrated the battle of Al Waki Market where No. 1 Squadron RAF Regiment were attacked by 50 Iraqi insurgents.

His In Safe Hands (2010) shows a casualty and the response from the Medical Emergency Response Team in a CH-47 Chinook in Afghanistan. The painting was commissioned by the UK Special Forces Medical Group and hangs in the Royal College of Anaesthetists, London.

The Queen Alexandra's Royal Army Nursing Corps (QARANC) commissioned Brown to paint What Matters Most, set during Operation Gritrock in a field hospital inside the ‘Red Zone’ isolation area of the Ebola Virus Disease Treatment Unit in Sierra Leone, depicting the Defence Medical Services personnel at work in personal protective equipment. In the painting, a healthcare assistant holds the hand of a man with ebola; he survives. In 2016 it was unveiled on Chief Nursing Officer's study day by the Countess of Wessex, as Colonel-in-Chief of QARANC, at the Royal Military Academy Sandhurst. The painting hangs in Robertson House.

His other works have included a painting based on an assault by the 4th Battalion, Parachute Regiment on the German position at Laterza Bridge in 1943, the battle of Longstop Hill, and several based in Afghanistan; the Light Electronic Warfare Teams at work and a scene from Operation Herrick, and in the Central Intelligence Agency's collection, the first operational use of the stinger missile in Afghanistan.

== See also ==
- Military art
- Southampton
- Iraq war
