= Janet Pilgrim (British Army officer) =

British Army nurse

- Born: c. 1966
- Military career
- Allegiance: United Kingdom
- Branch: British Army
- Rank: Lieutenant Colonel
- Nickname: "Florence of Arabia"
- Unit: Queen Alexandra's Royal Army Nursing Corps
- Conflicts: Kosovo War; War in Afghanistan; Iraq War
- Awards: Royal Red Cross; Queen's Commendation for Valuable Service

Major Janet Pilgrim, RRC (born c. 1966) is a former British Army nurse who was awarded the Royal Red Cross in 2008 for her services in Iraq. The Royal Red Cross was established by Queen Victoria in 1883 for exceptional service in the field of military nursing.

As commander of the Basra air base's field hospital during the battle with the Mehdi Army, she led the busiest British field hospital since the Falklands War. The hospital itself came under heavy fire on many occasions.

Pilgrim was educated at King's College London and was a member of the Queen Alexandra's Royal Army Nursing Corps. She served in Bosnia and Kosovo, prior to her deployment to Basra, and subsequently commanded the base hospital at Camp Bastion, Afghanistan. She was nominated by Cosmopolitan Magazine for their Ultimate Woman of the Year 2008 award.
