= Matthew Maer =

- Military career
- Allegiance: United Kingdom
- Branch: British Army
- Rank: Brigadier
- Service number: 521911
- Commands: 1st Battalion, Princess of Wales's Royal Regiment
- Conflicts: The Troubles; Iraq War
- Awards: Distinguished Service Order; Member of the Order of the British Empire

Brigadier Matthew [Matt] Philip Maer, DSO, MBE is a retired senior British Army officer. Maer commanded the 1st Battalion, Princess of Wales's Royal Regiment as a lieutenant colonel, deploying to Maysan, Iraq, in 2004 in the aftermath of the invasion of Iraq. In this role, he was awarded the Distinguished Service Order for his leadership, which included command of Victoria Cross recipient Johnson Beharry. Maer was promoted colonel on 30 June 2006, and brigadier on 30 June 2009. He was appointed a Member of the Order of the British Empire on 6 November 1998 in recognition of his "distinguished services in former Yugoslavia".
