= No. 1 Squadron RAF Regiment =

Royal Air Force Regiment Squadron

No. 1 Squadron, RAF Regiment
- Squadron badge
- Active: 1921 – present
- Country: United Kingdom
- Branch: Royal Air Force
- Type: Air Force Infantry
- Role: Force protection
- Size: c. 170 personnel
- Part of: No. 2 Group; Combat Readiness Force; No. 20 Wing RAF Regiment
- Station: RAF Honington
- Mottos: Swift and sudden (in cuneiform script)
- Equipment: Foxhound; Jackal

No. 1 Squadron RAF Regiment is a field squadron of the RAF Regiment in the Royal Air Force. Its mission is protection of RAF bases from ground attack, and patrolling a large area around main operating bases abroad, in order to defend aircraft on ingress and egress from surface to air attack. It is currently based at RAF Honington.

== History ==
It is a unit with a long history having its origin on 22 December 1921, when "No. 1 Armoured Car Company RAF" was formed at Heliopolis in Egypt. After undergoing many expansions and contractions No.1 Armoured Car Company was merged with No. 2701 Squadron RAF Regiment, and then on 25 February 1947 was renamed No. 1 (Armoured Car) Squadron RAF Regiment. The squadron initially retained its armoured car role, but lost this in 1953 when it assumed the dismounted field squadron role. The squadron was re-roled to a Light Anti-Aircraft unit in the late 1960s and early 1970s. It was then re-roled as a light armoured squadron, equipped initially with Saracen Armoured Personnel Carriers, and subsequently with the Combat Vehicle Reconnaissance (Tracked) series of vehicles, including Scorpion, Spartan, Sultan and Samson. In 1992, the RAF Regiment withdrew the CVR(T) from service and No. 1 Squadron reverted to the field role, in which it has remained since.

During the Cold War the squadron was predominantly based in Germany. It took part in the Berlin Airlift and numerous exercises. After a number of moves it found a more permanent home at RAF Laarbruch. At the end of 1998 the squadron was re-located to the UK, based at RAF St Mawgan in Cornwall. In the aftermath of the Cold War the squadron has seen frequent action. It was deployed against Iraq both in the 1991 Gulf War and in the 2003 invasion of Iraq. In addition it has been tasked with peacekeeping duties in the former Yugoslavia, including Bosnia, Croatia and Macedonia, and periodic deployments to Northern Ireland and Cyprus, and to Kuwait in support of British forces operating there.

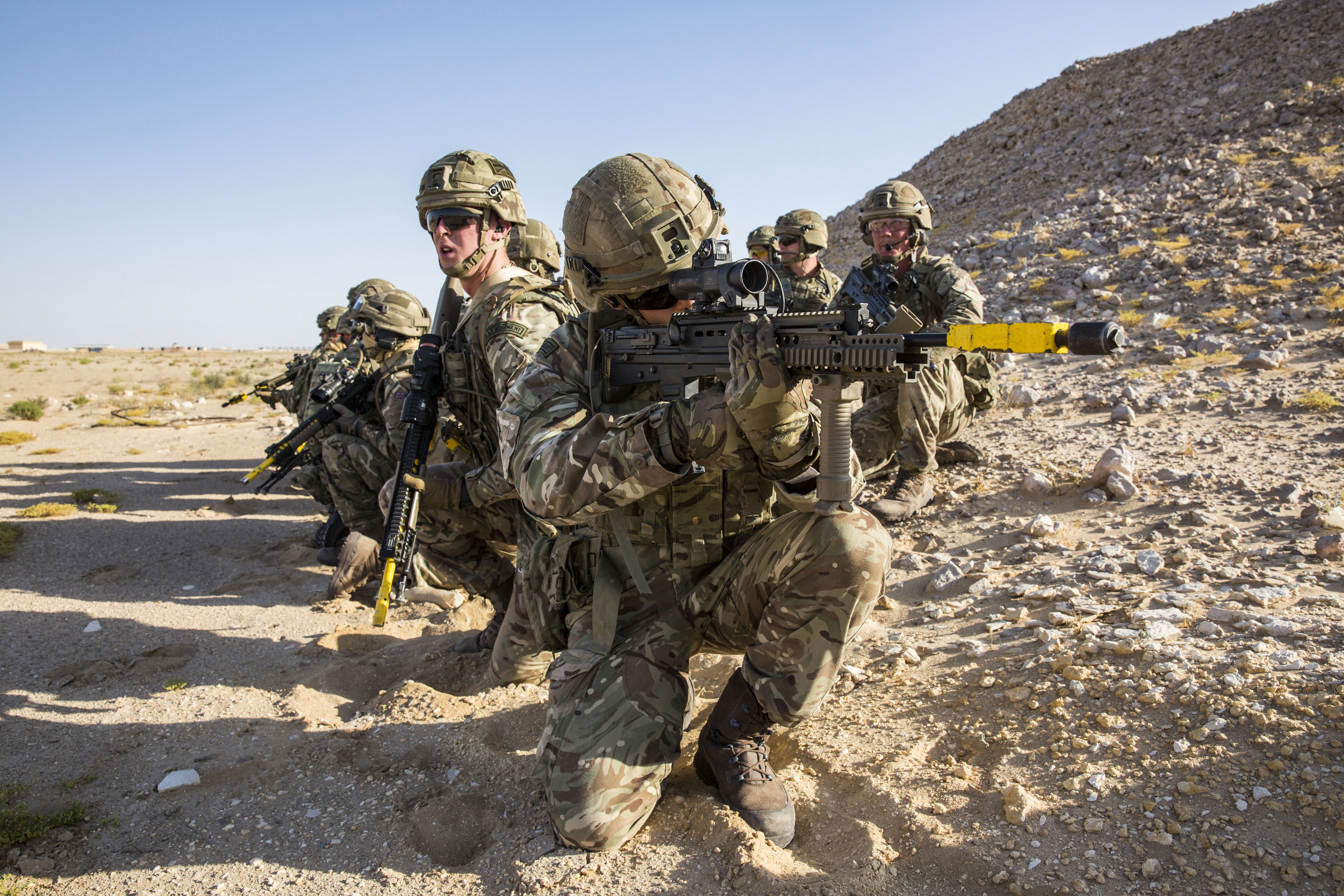
No. 1 Squadron RAF Regiment training during Exercise Saif Sareea 3 in 2018

The squadron took part in Exercise SAIF SAREEA in 2001 and elements were quickly re-tasked for operations in Afghanistan during Operation VERITAS. In 2003, No. 1 Squadron took part in the invasion of Iraq with 16 Air Assault Brigade and subsequently with 3 Commando Brigade. It was awarded the battle honour Iraq 2003 for its contribution. The squadron has returned to Iraq on three occasions since 2003, defending the Contingency Operating Base at Basra.

=== Casualties ===
On 19 July 2007, two Senior Aircraftmen from No.1 Squadron, SAC Matthew "Lip" Caulwell (22) of Birmingham and SAC Peter "Pete" McFerran (24) of Connah's Quay were killed during a rocket attack on Basrah Airfield. RAuxAF SAC Christopher Dunsmore attached to No.1 Squadron was also killed in an insurgent indirect fire attack on their base in Iraq. On 7 August 2007 Leading Aircraftman Martin 'Beardy' Beard from Mansfield was killed during a fire fight with Iraqi insurgents in the Battle of Al Waki Market. This last action resulted in the award of the Military Cross to one of the section commanders. The Officer Commanding, Sqn Ldr Sutton was awarded the OBE.

During No 1. Squadron's last tour (2010) defending Bastion Air Base (Helmand Province, Afghanistan) the squadron lost two gunners; Senior Aircraftman Kinikki Griffiths who was involved in a road traffic accident on patrol whilst serving with B flight and Senior Aircraftman Scott Hughes (C flight). Hughes was killed when he was hit by a British Army Power boat in Cyprus whilst swimming in a recreation area during decompression (a period of rest and relaxation in the company of their mates which is thought to help troops relax before returning home).

== Heritage ==
The squadron's heraldic badge features an Assyrian war chariot, reflecting that the squadron's early armoured cars were the modern equivalent of the chariot and that the squadron was formed in the part of the world where the Assyrians originated.

The squadron's motto is Swift and sudden. It is displayed on the squadron's badge in cuneiform, an ancient Near East script.

== Battle honours ==
No. 1 Squadron has received the following battle honours. Those marked with an asterisk (*) may be emblazoned on the squadron standard.

- Kurdistan (1922–1923)
- Kurdistan (1930–1931)
- Palestine (1936)
- Habbaniya, Iraq (1941)
- Egypt & Libya (1941–1943)
- Gulf (1991)
- Former Yugoslavia (1995)
- Bosnia (1997)
- Kuwait (1999)
- Afghanistan (2001–2014)*
- Iraq (2003 – 2011)

== See also ==
- List of RAF Regiment units
