= Michelle Norris =

British Army soldier

Michelle Suzanne Claire Norris
- Born: Stourbridge, West Midlands, England
- Military career
- Allegiance: United Kingdom
- Branch: British Army
- Service years: since 2005
- Rank: Sergeant
- Nickname: "Chuck"
- Unit: Royal Army Medical Corps
- Conflicts: Iraq War
- Awards: Military Cross

Sergeant Michelle Suzanne Claire "Chuck" Norris MC is a British Army soldier and medic noted for heroism in the Iraq War. She is the first woman to be awarded the Military Cross. Norris was awarded her medal personally by Queen Elizabeth II on 21 March 2007 as the result of her actions on 11 June 2006 while attached to The Princess of Wales's Royal Regiment in Iraq.

== Early life ==
Norris was born at Stourbridge, West Midlands, England.

== Military career ==
On 11 June 2006, Norris saw the most intense and largest battle in Iraq since 2004. A search operation in Al Amarah saw Norris's company group come under heavy sustained and accurate fire from a well-organized enemy force of more than 200. Private Norris was serving as a Combat Medical Technician attached to the 1st Battalion Princess of Wales's Royal Regiment, Norris (then aged 19) jumped out of her Warrior Patrol vehicle and climbed up the side of it to rescue the vehicle commander, Colour Sergeant Ian Page, who had been shot in the mouth, all while being heavily fired upon by snipers at night. One bullet hit the radio next to her knee while she was treating the wounded soldier. She then helped drag the sergeant back into the vehicle while still being fired upon. Her commanding officer recommended that she receive a medal for her bravery, and the award of the Military Cross was gazetted on 15 December 2006. She received the decoration from Queen Elizabeth II at Buckingham Palace on 21 March 2007. The scene from 11 June is depicted in an oil on canvas by artist Stuart Brown.

Norris and Page were evacuated by a British Lynx helicopter, which was being flown by Captain William Chesarek of the United States Marine Corps as the result of an officer exchange programme. Chesarek was subsequently awarded the Distinguished Flying Cross as a result of his actions on this occasion, receiving the award at the same time Norris received her Military Cross.

== Awards ==

Military Cross (MC)	(2006)
Iraq Medal	
Queen Elizabeth II Diamond Jubilee Medal	(2012)
