= William Chesarek =

United States Marine Corps officer

William D. Chesarek Jr.
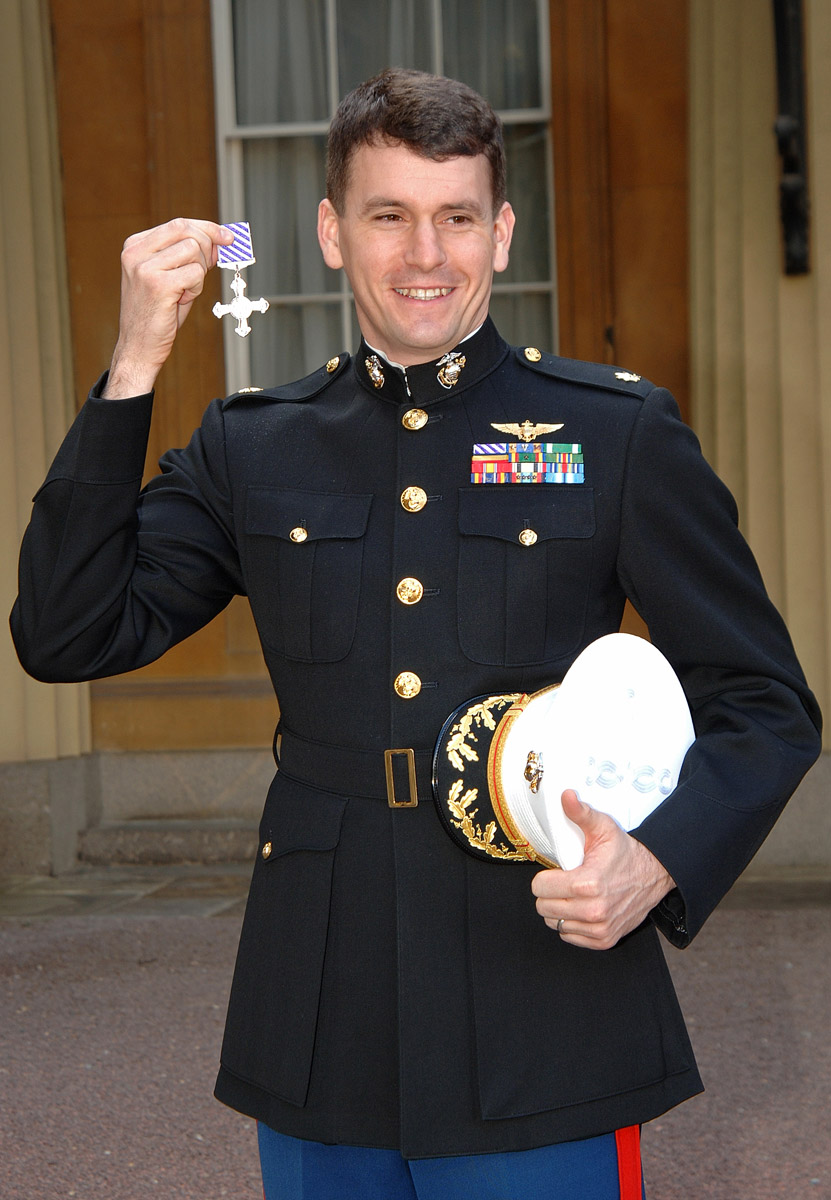
- Major William Chesarek displays the Distinguished Flying Cross he received from Queen Elizabeth II at Buckingham Palace, March 21, 2007.
- Born: Newport, Rhode Island
- Military career
- Allegiance: United States
- Branch: United States Marine Corps
- Rank: Lieutenant Colonel
- Nickname: "Punchy"
- Units: HMLA-369; HMM-262; 847 Naval Air Squadron; 1st Marine Regiment
- Conflicts: Iraq War; War in Afghanistan
- Awards: Meritorious Service Medal; Air Medal; Navy and Marine Corps Commendation Medal; Distinguished Flying Cross (United Kingdom)

William David Chesarek Jr., DFC is an officer of the United States Marine Corps. As of 2022 the Marine Corps University listed him as Deputy Director of the Expeditionary Warfare School, with the rank of lieutenant colonel, a rank he was promoted to in 2012.

== Military career ==
=== Exchange program and actions in Iraq ===
From 2005 Chesarek began participation in an exchange program between the USMC and their counterparts in the Royal Marines. As a weapons and tactics instructor he joined 847 Naval Air Squadron of the Royal Navy's Commando Helicopter Force learning to fly the Westland Lynx in support of 3 Commando Brigade. In June 2006 he was a Captain when along with the rest of 847 NAS he deployed to Basra, Iraq.

Flying a Lynx AH.7 helicopter on the evening of June 10, 2006, Chesarek was providing radio communication relay for British ground troops conducting a company-sized search operation near Amarah, Iraq. Monitoring radio transmissions, he overheard that a vehicle involved in the operation had become disabled and a crowd of insurgents was firing small arms and rocket-propelled grenades at the company.

His award citation tells, "Chesarek elected to fly low over the area in an attempt to distract the crowd and if possible, to engage the insurgents." Because the crowd of civilians was so close to the ground troops, he decided that instead of engaging his machine gun, he "opted instead to provide bold, harassing, very low level flight over the area in an attempt to disperse the crowd."

However, Chesarek learned from radio traffic from the ground that he was now the target and was drawing weapons fire, and that a rocket-propelled grenade had just missed the tail of his helicopter.

Using his view from the air, Chesarek, who was trained as an airborne forward air controller, then used his skills to coordinate, designate and control fixed-wing aircraft in providing close air support, which resulted in dispersing the insurgents.

Chesarek, aware that a British soldier, Colour Sergeant Ian Page, had been critically injured with a gunshot wound to the head, then made the decision that as the only helicopter in the area he would conduct a medical evacuation with the Lynx despite his version of the aircraft type not being designed for this use. Landing the Lynx near the soldier in distress, his door gunner and another crew member jumped out, picked up the injured soldier and put him into the aircraft. The other crew member who disembarked elected to stay on the ground so the helicopter would not then be forced to fly overweight.

As a result of his actions that day, he was awarded the British Distinguished Flying Cross. The award was announced by the British Ministry of Defence on December 15, 2006. He received the award from Queen Elizabeth II at Buckingham Palace on March 21, 2007.

After which Chesarek reflected on his lost comrades and brothers in arms saying:

I am greatly honored and would like to accept this prestigious award for 847 NAS in memory of Lt. Cmdr. Darren Chapman (Royal Navy), Capt. David Dobson (Army Air Corps), and Marine Paul Collins (Royal Marines), who were killed in action over Basrah in May 2006,

He continued:

The awarded actions were only possible due to the combined effort of my combat crew; Lt. David Williams (Royal Navy) and Lance Cpl. Max Carter (Royal Marines). My greatest sense of achievement that day is in knowing the ground troops all made it home.

Michelle Norris, the young British medic who initially aided Page while under fire, received her Military Cross (the first woman to do so) at the same ceremony.

Chesarek is the first US serviceman to receive this significant British decoration (roughly equivalent to the Silver Star as the third-tier gallantry/valor decoration) since the end of the Korean War.

== Awards ==

Naval Aviator insignia
1st Row	Meritorious Service Medal			
2nd row	Air Medal	Navy and Marine Corps Commendation Medal w/ 1 award star	Navy Presidential Unit Citation	Navy Unit Commendation w/ 1 service star
3rd Row	Meritorious Unit Commendation	National Defense Service Medal	Iraq Campaign Medal w/ 1 service star	Global War on Terrorism Expeditionary Medal
4th Row	Global War on Terrorism Service Medal	Navy Sea Service Deployment Ribbon w/ 4 service stars	Navy Arctic Service Ribbon	Distinguished Flying Cross (UK) (Note: Note: According to uniform regulations, foreign awards are worn last in precedence except when visiting the awarding nation in an official function, such as in the above photo.)

== See also ==
- List of historically important U.S. Marines
