= Mick Flynn =

Highly decorated British Army Warrant Officer

Michael John Flynn
- Born: 1960 (age 65–66); Cardiff, Wales
- Military career
- Allegiance: United Kingdom
- Branch: British Army
- Service years: 1979–1993; 2001–2012
- Rank: Warrant Officer Class 1
- Nickname: "Bullet Magnet"
- Conflicts: Northern Ireland; Falklands War: Battle of Mount Tumbledown; Bosnian War; Iraq War; War in Afghanistan
- Awards: Conspicuous Gallantry Cross; Military Cross

Michael John Flynn, CGC, MC (born 1960) is one of the British Army's most decorated members in recent years.

Flynn was born in Cardiff, Wales, in 1960. He joined the British Army and served in the Blues and Royals. He has seen active service in Northern Ireland, the Falklands War, the Bosnian War, the Iraq War and the War in Afghanistan. In 2003 he was awarded the Conspicuous Gallantry Cross as a lance corporal of horse when serving with D Squadron, Blues and Royals in Iraq. In August 2006 Corporal of Horse Flynn was awarded the Military Cross in Helmand province, southern Afghanistan, in action against the Taliban.
