= Distinguished Flying Cross (United Kingdom) =

Military decoration of the United Kingdom

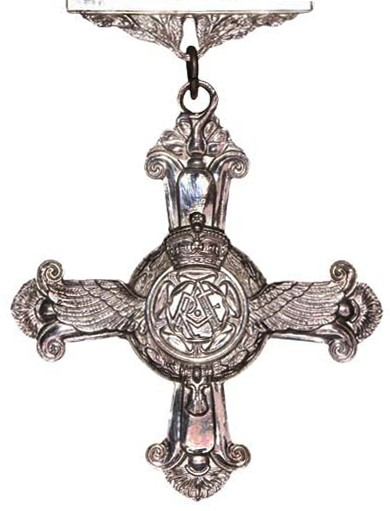
- Obverse of the decoration
- Type: Military decoration
- Awarded for: ... exemplary gallantry during active operations against the enemy in the air.
- Presented by: United Kingdom and Commonwealth
- Eligibility: British, Commonwealth, and allied forces
- Status: Currently awarded
- Established: 3 June 1918

Highlights
- Total: To 2017: 22,322 crosses; 1,737 bars
- Ribbon: No bars 1918–1919: horizontal alternate white and purple stripes 1919–current: Diagonal alternate white and purple stripes

Order of Wear
- Next (higher): Military Cross
- Next (lower): Air Force Cross
- Related: Distinguished Flying Medal

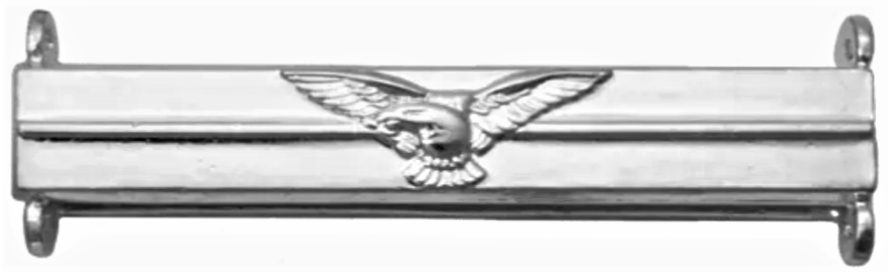
Ribbon bar for a 2nd award

The Distinguished Flying Cross (DFC) is the third-level military decoration awarded to officers, and since 1993 to other ranks, of the United Kingdom's Royal Air Force and other services, and formerly to officers of other Commonwealth countries, for "an act or acts of valour, courage or devotion to duty whilst flying in active operations against the enemy".

== History ==
The award was established on 3 June 1918, shortly after the formation of the Royal Air Force (RAF), with the Royal Warrant published on 5 December 1919. It was originally awarded to RAF commissioned and warrant officers, including officers in Commonwealth and allied forces. In March 1941 eligibility was extended to Naval Officers of the Fleet Air Arm, and in November 1942 to Army officers, including Royal Artillery officers serving on attachment to the RAF as pilots-cum-artillery observers. Posthumous awards were permitted from 1979.

Since the 1993 review of the honours system as part of the drive to remove distinctions of rank in bravery awards, all ranks of all arms of the Armed Forces have been eligible, and the Distinguished Flying Medal, which had until then been awarded to other ranks, was discontinued. While remaining a reward for "flying in active operations against the enemy", the requirement was changed from "valour, courage or devotion to duty" to "exemplary gallantry".

The DFC had also been awarded by Commonwealth countries but by the 1990s most, including Canada, Australia and New Zealand, had established their own honours systems and no longer recommended British honours.

The DFC now serves as the third-level award for all ranks of the British Armed Forces for exemplary gallantry in active operations against the enemy in the air, not to the standard required to receive the Victoria Cross or the Conspicuous Gallantry Cross. Apart from honorary awards to those serving with allied forces, all awards of the DFC are announced in the London Gazette.

A bar is added to the ribbon for holders of the DFC who received a further award, with a silver rosette worn on the ribbon when worn alone to denote the award of each bar.

Recipients are entitled to use the post-nominal letters "DFC".

== Description ==
The decoration, designed by Edward Carter Preston, is a cross flory, 2.125 inches (54.0 mm) wide. The horizontal and bottom bars are terminated with bumps, the upper bar with a rose. The decoration's face features aeroplane propellers, superimposed on the vertical arms of the cross, and wings on the horizontal arms. In the centre is a laurel wreath around the RAF monogram, surmounted by a heraldic Imperial Crown.

The reverse is plain, except for a central roundel bearing the reigning monarch's cypher and the date '1918'. Originally awarded unnamed, from 1939 the year of issue was engraved on the reverse lower limb of cross, and since 1984 it has been awarded named to the recipient.

The suspender is straight and decorated with laurel wreaths.

The ribbon bar denoting a further award is silver, with the Royal Air Force eagle in its centre. Bars awarded during World War II have the year of award engraved on the reverse.

The 1.25-inch (32 mm) ribbon was originally white with deep purple broad horizontal stripes, but it was changed in 1919 to the current white with purple broad diagonal stripes.

Distinguished Flying Cross ribbon bars
	DFC	DFC and Bar	DFC and Two Bars
1918–1919			
since 1919			

== Recipients ==
=== Numbers awarded ===
From 1918 to 2017 approximately 22,322 Distinguished Flying Crosses and 1,737 bars have been awarded. The figures to 1979 are laid out in the table below, the dates reflecting the relevant entries in the London Gazette:

Period		Crosses	1st bar	2nd bar
World War I	1918–19	1,045	62	3
Inter–War	1919–39	165	26	4
World War II	1939–45	20,354	1,550	42
Post–War	1946–79	678	42	5
Total	1918–79	22,242	1,680	54

Between 1980 and 2017 approximately 80 DFCs have been earned, including awards for the Falklands and the wars in the Gulf, Iraq and Afghanistan. Additionally, two second-award, and one third-award bars have been awarded.

The above figures include awards to the Dominions:
In all, 4,460 DFCs have gone to Canadians, including 256 first bars and six second bars. Of these, 193 crosses and nine first bars were for service with the RAF in World War I. For World War II, 4,018 DFCs with 213 first bars and six second bars were earned by members of the Royal Canadian Air Force, with a further 247 crosses and 34 first bars to Canadians serving with the RAF.
From 1918 to 1972 the DFC was awarded to 2,391 Australians, along with 144 first Bars and five second Bars.
Over 1,000 DFCs were awarded to New Zealanders during the World War II, with the most recent awards for service in Vietnam. In 1999 the DFC was replaced by the New Zealand Gallantry Decoration.

A total of 1,022 honorary awards have been made to members of allied foreign forces. This comprises 46 crosses and one bar for World War I and 927, along with 34 first and three second bars, for World War II. Eight crosses and two bars were awarded to members of the US Air Force for the Korean War, and one cross to the US Marine Corps during the Iraq War.

=== Notable awards ===
- King Albert I of Belgium, who on many occasions during World War I was flown in a British aircraft to reconnoitre enemy positions.
- Wing Commander Douglas Rivers Bagnall, DSO, who was also awarded also the American DFC.
- John Balmer, RAAF pilot
- Wing Commander Clive Beadon, pilot during World War II
- Roy Calvert, Royal New Zealand Air Force pilot who was awarded the DFC three times.
- Major General Levi R. Chase, American flying ace, awarded DFC with bar (WWII and Korea)
- Major William Chesarek, United States Marine Corps, helicopter pilot who in 2006 rescued a British serviceman during the Iraq War.
- Flight Lieutenant Pierre Clostermann, French RAF officer, awarded RAF DFC and bar in 1945.
- Flight Lieutenant Robert Clothier, RCAF, and later a noted Canadian television actor known for the role of "Relic" in The Beachcombers
- Harry Cobby, flying ace of the Australian Flying Corps who was awarded the DFC three times.
- Gordon Cochrane, RNZAF pilot who was awarded the DFC three times.
- Captain Duncan Ronald Gordon Mackay, the last fatality of the First World War.
- Peter Stanley James, RAF, who in July 1941 took part in a daylight raid on the German battleship Scharnhorst in dock at La Rochelle.
- Philip Robinson, RAF pilot who was awarded the DFC three times.
- Squadron Leader George Leonard Johnson, navigator who took part in 'Operation Chastise'.
- Keith 'Bluey' Truscott, famous footballer and RAAF pilot who was awarded the DFC twice.
- Arjan Singh, Indian Air Force. He later became Marshal of the Indian Air Force.
- Squadron Leader Mohinder Singh Pujji, Indian Air Force.
- Group Captain Peter Townsend, CVO, DSO, DFC & bar. An RAF flying ace, courtier and author, he was equerry to King George VI and Queen Elizabeth II, and also had a romance with Princess Margaret.
- Harold Whistler, Royal Flying Corps flying ace who was awarded the DFC three times
- Wing Commander Stanisław Skalski from Poland in R.A.F. flying aces probably first air victory II W.W. in Europe. DSO and two bar, DFC two bar.
- Wing Commander Robert Stanford Tuck, Royal Air Force flying ace who was awarded the DFC three times
- Squadron Leader Stuart Mitchell, Royal Air Force, the only tanker pilot to be awarded the DFC to date, for his actions in the Bosnia campaign.
- Flight Lieutenant Michelle Jayne Goodman, the first female officer to be awarded any British combat gallantry medal.

== See also ==
- Commonwealth Realms orders and decorations
