= Doublet =

Doublet is a word derived from the Latin duplus, "twofold, twice as much", and is used to indicate a pair of identical, similar, or related things.

Doublet may refer to:

== Apparel ==
- Doublet (clothing), a man's snug-fitting buttoned jacket that was worn from the late 14th century to the mid 17th century
- Doublet (Highland dress), a formal jacket worn with Scottish highland dress

== Games ==
- Doublet (dominoes), a domino tile in which both ends have the same value
- Doublets (game), old English tables game in the same family as Backgammon
- Word ladder or "doublets", a word game invented by Lewis Carroll

== Language ==
- Doublet (linguistics), two or more words of the same language that come from the same etymon
- Doublet, in textual criticism, two different narrative accounts of the same actual event
- Legal doublet, a standardized phrase in English legal language consisting of two (or more) words

== Science and technology ==
- Doublet (computing), a group of 16 bits in computing
- Doublet (lens), a type of lens, made up of two stacked layers with different refractive indices
- Doublet (potential flow), fluid flow due to a source–sink combination
- Doublet, or dimeresia howellii, a tiny flowering plant
- Doublet earthquake, two earthquakes associated by space and time
- Doublet state, a state in quantum physics of a system with a spin of 1/2
- Unit doublet, in mathematics, the derivative of the Dirac delta function

== Other uses ==
- Doublet (horse), (b. 1963 - †.1974), a thoroughbred gelding
- Doublet (lapidary), an assembled gem composed in two sections, such as a garnet overlaying green glass
- Doublet (hunt), two shots from a double barrel, coming one after another
- Pierre Jean Louis Ovide Doublet (1749–1824), French politician and writer affiliated with the Order of Malta
- Michel Doublet (1939–2022), French politician.
