= Peter Edmonds =

British police officer

Peter Edmonds QGM
- Born: Peter Roy Edmonds; December 8, 1948; Nottingham, England
- Died: March 4, 2005 (aged 56); Dolton, Devon, England
- Known for: Capturing Ian Ball, the would-be kidnapper of Princess Anne
- Police career
- Country: Metropolitan Police Service
- Service years: 1971–1998
- Rank: Detective Sergeant (DS)

Peter Edmonds QGM (1948–2005) was a British police officer who received the Queen's Gallantry Medal for bravery.

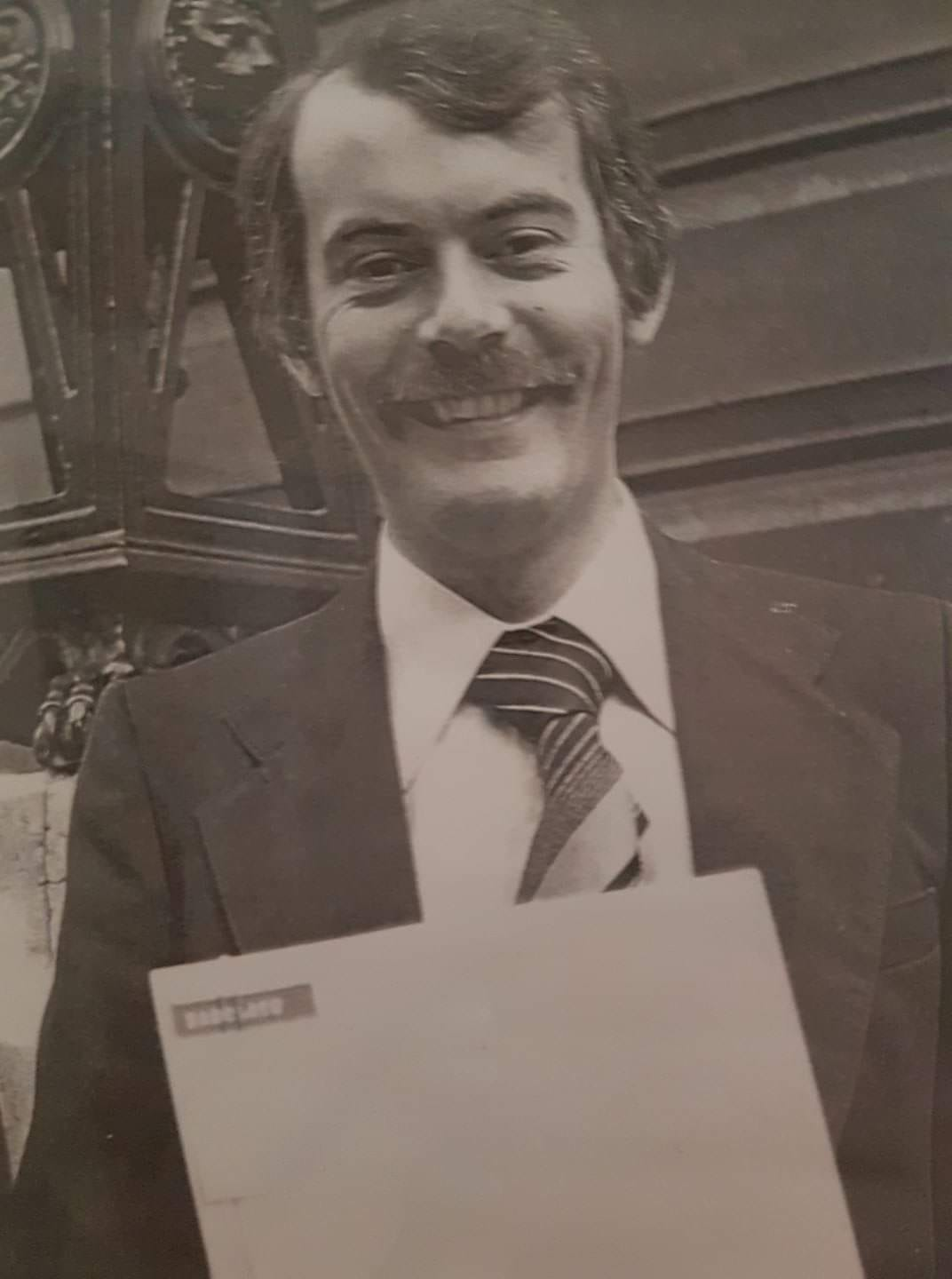
DS Peter Edmonds receiving commendation from the Metropolitan Police

== Policing career ==
Edmonds joined the Metropolitan Police Service in 1971; he spent most of his career within the CID and reached the rank of Detective Sergeant. His tenure as a police officer saw a number of achievements and commendations, most notably for his role in helping to prevent the kidnap attempt of Princess Anne in The Mall, London on 20 March 1974.

Edmonds was on duty as a temporary detective constable at Cannon Row police station when the call about the attack was received. He drove to the scene in his own car, and saw a man with a gun running across St James's Park. Edmonds gave chase and, although threatened with the gun, brought the would-be kidnapper to the ground and arrested him.

Princess Anne had been returning to Buckingham Palace from an official function with her then husband, Captain Mark Phillips, when a small car slewed in front of the royal limousine and braked sharply. A 26-year-old man, Ian Ball, leaped out brandishing two handguns, smashed one of the car's windows and, pointing a gun directly at the princess and Captain Phillips, ordered them to alight. Inspector James Beaton, the princess's protection officer, drew his firearm and confronted him, but was shot three times; he was later awarded the George Cross. In the end it was left to Edmonds to capture Ball, who was subsequently sentenced to indefinite detention under the Mental Health Act.

As a detective, Edmonds served mainly in the East End and had several spells in such units as the stolen car squad. Three years after the incident in The Mall, Edmonds and a detective sergeant were confronted by a gunman who had stolen a car to rob a post office. The robber ordered Edmonds and the detective sergeant to raise their hands, then turned and ran, firing as he went. The two detectives eventually overpowered him, and Edmonds received a Commissioner's High Commendation.

Edmonds retired from the Metropolitan Police as a detective sergeant in 1998. During his service he had been commended by an Old Bailey judge, the Director of Public Prosecutions and the Bow Street magistrates; he had been awarded two Commissioner's High Commendations and received five Commendations for bravery and detective ability.

== Personal life ==
Peter Roy Edmonds was born in Nottingham on 8 December 1948. His parents moved to Plymouth where Edmonds was educated at local schools. Relatively well known in the local live music circuit in 1960s Devon, Edmonds played keyboard and other instruments in bands such as Plymouth Sound. He became an apprentice shipwright at Devonport dockyard, but later went to South Africa for two years to work in a shipyard at Durban. On returning to England, he became a maintenance engineer in London before joining the Metropolitan Police.

After retiring to Devon, Edmonds pursued his hobbies of building restoration, surfing and music. He achieved his life-long ambition of visiting New Orleans and playing keyboards with various groups.

Edmonds died of a heart attack in Dolton, Devon on 4 March 2005, and was survived by three children and six grand-children.
