= James Beaton (disambiguation) =

James Beaton (1473–1539) was a Scottish church leader, Archbishop of Glasgow and Archbishop of St Andrews

James Beaton may also refer to:

- James Beaton (archbishop of Glasgow) (1517–1603)
- Jim Beaton (James Wallace Beaton, born 1943), former Queen's Police Officer and bodyguard
