= Brian Dutton (Royal Navy officer) =

Bomb disposal officer

- Born: 15 November 1931; Southend-on-Sea, Essex, England
- Died: 23 April 2018 (aged 86)
- Military career
- Allegiance: United Kingdom
- Branch: Royal Navy
- Service years: 1948–1983
- Rank: Lieutenant Commander
- Commands: Fleet Clearance Diving Team 1
- Conflicts: Korean War; Falklands War
- Awards: Distinguished Service Order; Queen's Gallantry Medal

Brian Frank Dutton, DSO, QGM (15 November 1931 – 23 April 2018) was a Royal Navy bomb-disposal officer who served in the Falklands War. He was awarded the Distinguished Service Order in 1982 for disposing of an unexploded Argentine bomb on HMS Argonaut, and the Queen's Gallantry Medal for dealing with an unexploded German mine in 1974. On retirement he was beadle of the Worshipful Company of Carpenters, later a liveryman of that company, mayor of Petersfield and chairman of East Hampshire council.
