= Transaid =

United Kingdom-based charity

- Formation: 1998
- Founder: Save the Children; Chartered Institute of Logistics and Transport; Anne, Princess Royal
- Type: Charity
- Purpose: Safe, sustainable transport access
- Location(s): 137 Euston Road London NW1 2AA
- Chief Executive: Caroline Barber
- Website: www.transaid.org

Transaid is a United Kingdom-based charity launched in 1998.

== History ==
Transaid was founded in 1998 by Save the Children, the Chartered Institute of Logistics and Transport (CILT), and its patron, Anne, Princess Royal. It is a UK‑based international development charity focused on transforming lives through safe, available, and sustainable transport in sub‑Saharan Africa. The charity operates multiple programmes in several countries, working with governments, communities, and industry partners to improve road safety, transport management, and access to healthcare.

In recent years, Transaid has been active in motorcycle helmet safety in Kenya through its Kenya National Helmet Wearing Coalition, working with the FIA Foundation and others to build enforcement of helmet standards, establish awareness among riders, and to set up a helmet testing laboratory in East Africa. The charity has also launched its Christmas Appeal 2025 to raise funds from individuals and businesses for road safety and healthcare access across sub‑Saharan Africa; in that appeal, it reported having trained over 9,000 professional drivers and riders, delivered thousands of eye tests, and supported minibus‑taxis adopting safety charters. Additionally in early 2025, Princess Anne opened the new London office of Arbuthnot Latham, a corporate partner of Transaid, emphasising the strengthening of corporate backing and visibility for the charity.
