= Queen Elizabeth II Garden =

Coordinates: 51.5290°N 0.1495°W

The Queen Elizabeth II Garden is a two-acre public garden in Regent's Park, created to commemorate the life of Queen Elizabeth II. The garden was officially opened by Anne, Princess Royal, on 21 April 2026, marking what would have been her centenary. It has been developed on the site of a former horticultural nursery on the Broad Walk near the Avenue Gardens, which was decommissioned in 2018 following the opening of the Hyde Park Nursery. The project, led by the Royal Parks and designed by HTA Design, is intended as a tranquil public space for reflection featuring elements such as a pond, viewing platform, and planting schemes associated with the Queen. Costing about £5 million and supported by charitable funding, the garden also restores two acres of accessible green space in central London with multiple entrances and accessible pathways.

The garden has been designed to enhance biodiversity by transforming the former brownfield site into a diverse "micro-mosaic" of habitats, including wildflower meadows, hedgerows, climate-resilient planting, and an ornamental pond. The redevelopment replaces former glasshouses and hard landscaping with features such as more than 40 trees, thousands of square metres of meadow and planting, and habitats intended to support insects, birds, amphibians, and mammals. Before opening, species such as hedgehogs, bats, bees, butterflies, newts, and foxes have been recorded using the site, reflecting a significant increase in ecological value. The design also incorporates sustainable water management systems, reused materials, and climate-adapted planting, while maintaining year-round horticultural interest and supporting pollinators through large-scale bulb planting.
