= Anne, Princess Royal =

British princess (born 1950)

Anne
- Princess Royal (more)
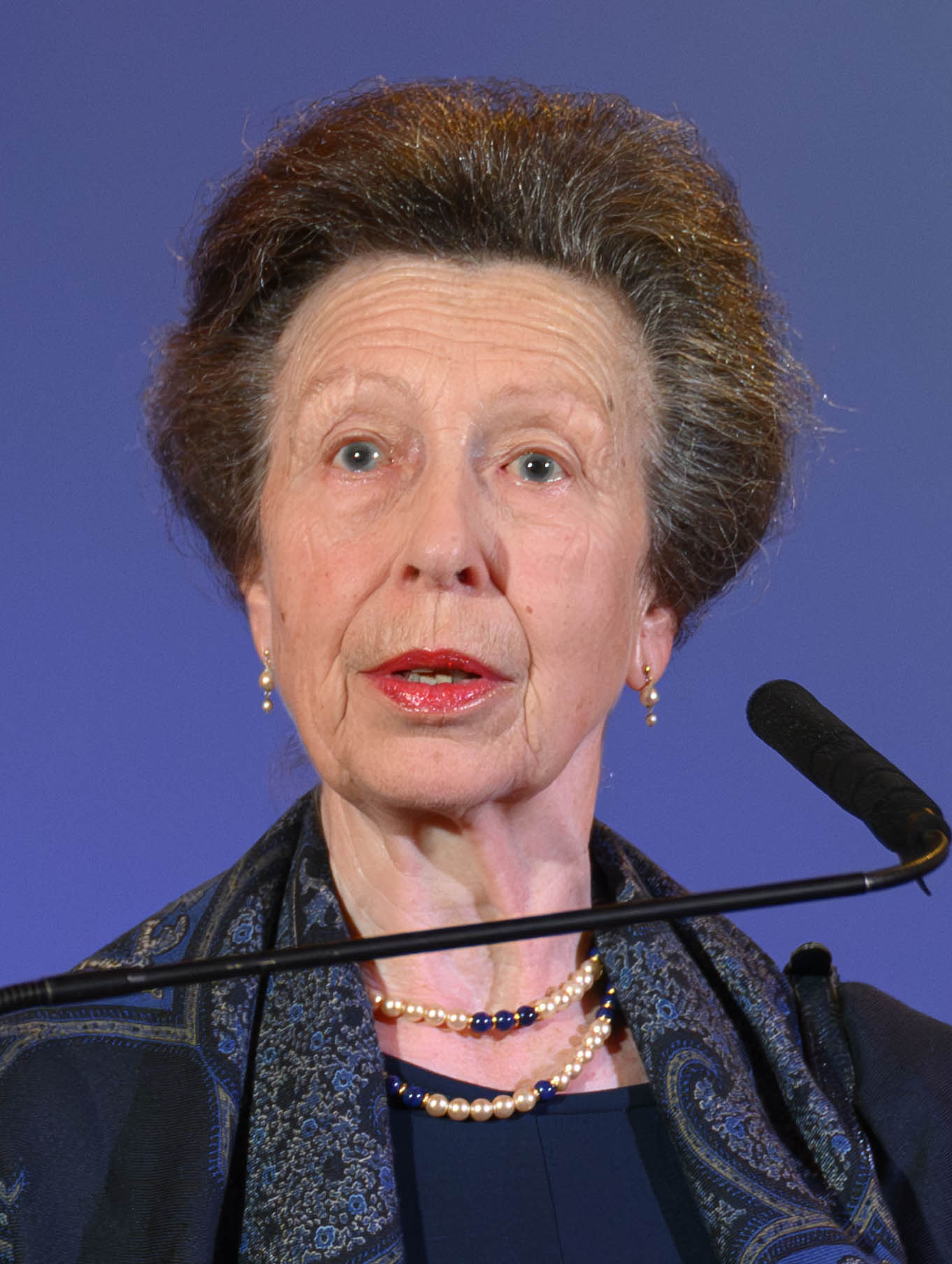
- Anne in 2025
- Born: Princess Anne of Edinburgh; 15 August 1950 (age 76); Clarence House, London, England
- Spouses: Mark Phillips (m. 1973; div. 1992); Timothy Laurence (m. 1992)
- Issue Detail: Peter Phillips; Zara Tindall
Names
- Anne Elizabeth Alice Louise (Note: As a member of the royal family, Anne does not usually use a family name but when one is needed, it is Mountbatten-Windsor.)
- House: Windsor
- Father: Prince Philip, Duke of Edinburgh
- Mother: Elizabeth II

Anne, Princess Royal (Anne Elizabeth Alice Louise; born 15 August 1950), is a member of the British royal family. She is the second child and only daughter of Queen Elizabeth II and Prince Philip, Duke of Edinburgh, and the sister of King Charles III. Born third in the line of succession to the British throne, she is 19th in line as of 2026. She has held the title of Princess Royal since 1987.

Born at Clarence House, Anne was educated at Benenden School and began carrying out official royal duties in early adulthood. A distinguished equestrian, she won one gold medal at the 1971 and two silver medals at the 1975 European Eventing Championships. In 1976, she became the first member of the British royal family to compete in the Olympic Games. She has been a member of the International Olympic Committee since 1988.

Anne continues to undertake engagements and official duties on behalf of the monarch – she has attended more than 20,000 such events since commencing royal duties in 1968. She presently serves as patron or honorary president of more than 300 organisations, including WISE, Riders for Health, Carers Trust, and Transaid. Her charitable work focuses primarily on sport, science, disability, and health in developing countries. She has been closely associated with Save the Children for more than fifty years and has visited numerous projects supported by the organisation worldwide.

In 1973, Anne married Captain Mark Phillips; the couple separated in 1989 and divorced in 1992. They have two children, Peter Phillips and Zara Tindall. In 1992, she married Commander (now Vice Admiral) Sir Timothy Laurence, whom she met during his service as an equerry to Queen Elizabeth II.

== Early life and education ==
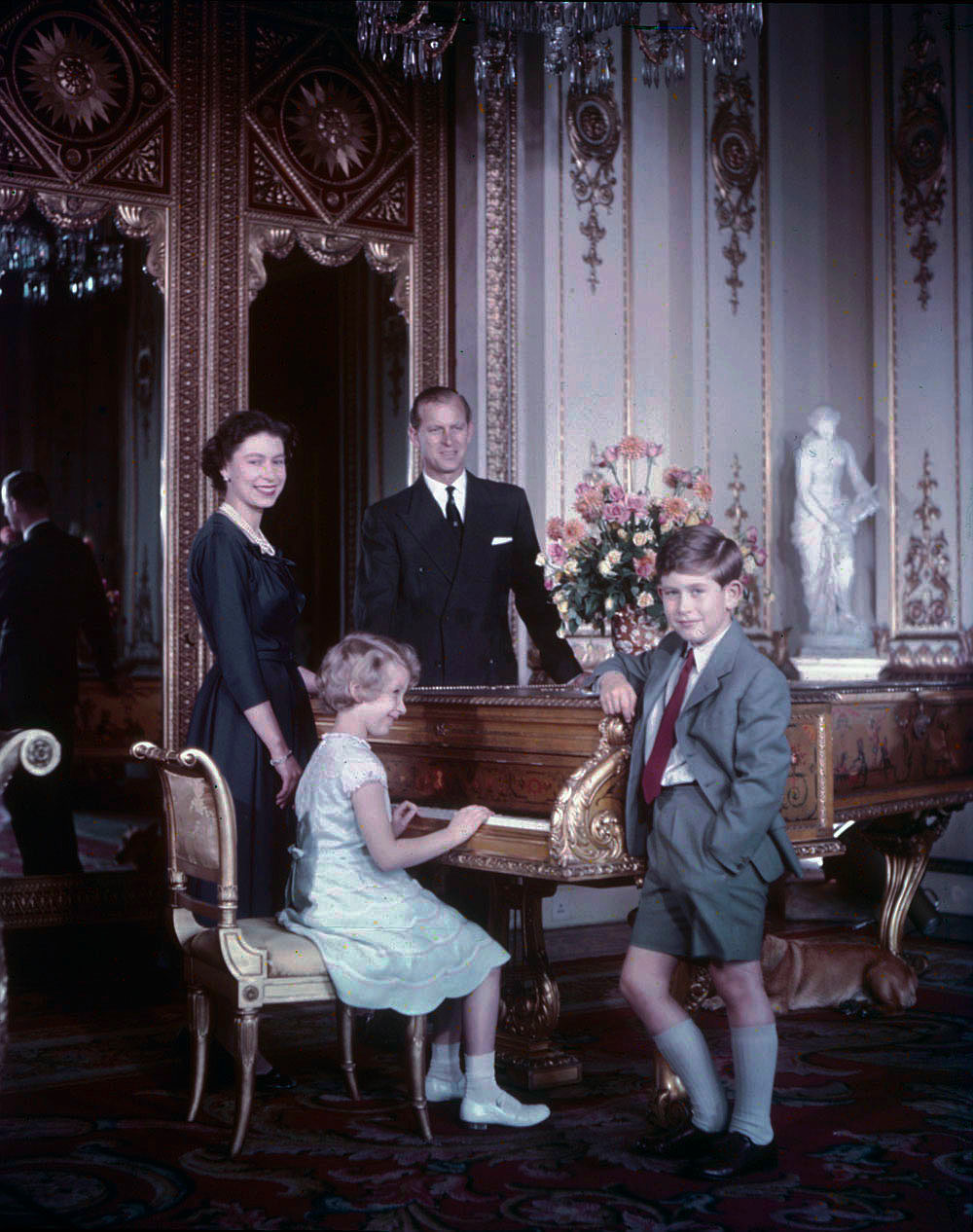
Anne with her parents and elder brother, Charles, in October 1957

Anne was born at 11:50 am on 15 August 1950 at Clarence House in London, during the reign of her maternal grandfather, King George VI. She was the second child and only daughter of Princess Elizabeth, Duchess of Edinburgh (later Queen Elizabeth II), and Philip, Duke of Edinburgh. A 21-gun salute in Hyde Park marked the occasion. Anne was baptised in the Music Room at Buckingham Palace on 21 October, by the Archbishop of York, Cyril Garbett. (Note: Her godparents were the Queen (later Queen Elizabeth The Queen Mother, her maternal grandmother); the Hereditary Princess of Hohenlohe-Langenburg (her paternal aunt); Princess Andrew of Greece and Denmark (her paternal grandmother); Louis Mountbatten, 1st Earl Mountbatten of Burma (her paternal great-uncle); and Andrew Elphinstone (her first cousin once removed).) At the time of her birth, she was third in the line of succession to the British throne, behind her mother and elder brother, Charles (later King Charles III). She rose to second in 1952 after her grandfather's death and her mother's accession; she is currently 19th in line.

A governess, Catherine Peebles, was appointed to oversee the early education of Anne and her brothers, Charles, Andrew, and Edward. Peebles supervised Anne's lessons at Buckingham Palace. Owing to her young age, Anne did not attend her mother's coronation in June 1953.

In May 1959, a Girl Guides unit, the 1st Buckingham Palace Guide Company, incorporating the Holy Trinity Brompton Brownie pack, was re-formed specifically so that Anne, like her mother and her aunt Princess Margaret before her, could socialise with girls her own age. The company remained active until 1963, when Anne left for boarding school. She enrolled at Benenden School in 1963, leaving in 1968 with six GCE O-Levels and two A-Levels. She began undertaking royal engagements in 1969, at the age of 18.

== Equestrianism ==
Medal record

Representing United Kingdom

Equestrian

European Championships
Gold medal – first place	1971 Burghley	Individual eventing
Silver medal – second place	1975 Luhmühlen	Team eventing
Silver medal – second place	1975 Luhmühlen	Individual eventing

In spring 1971, Anne finished fourth at the Rushall Horse Trials. At the age of 21, she won the individual title at the European Eventing Championship on her home-bred horse Doublet, and was voted the BBC Sports Personality of the Year for 1971. She also rode winners in horse racing, competing in the Grand Military Steeplechase at Sandown Park Racecourse and the Diamond Stakes at Royal Ascot.

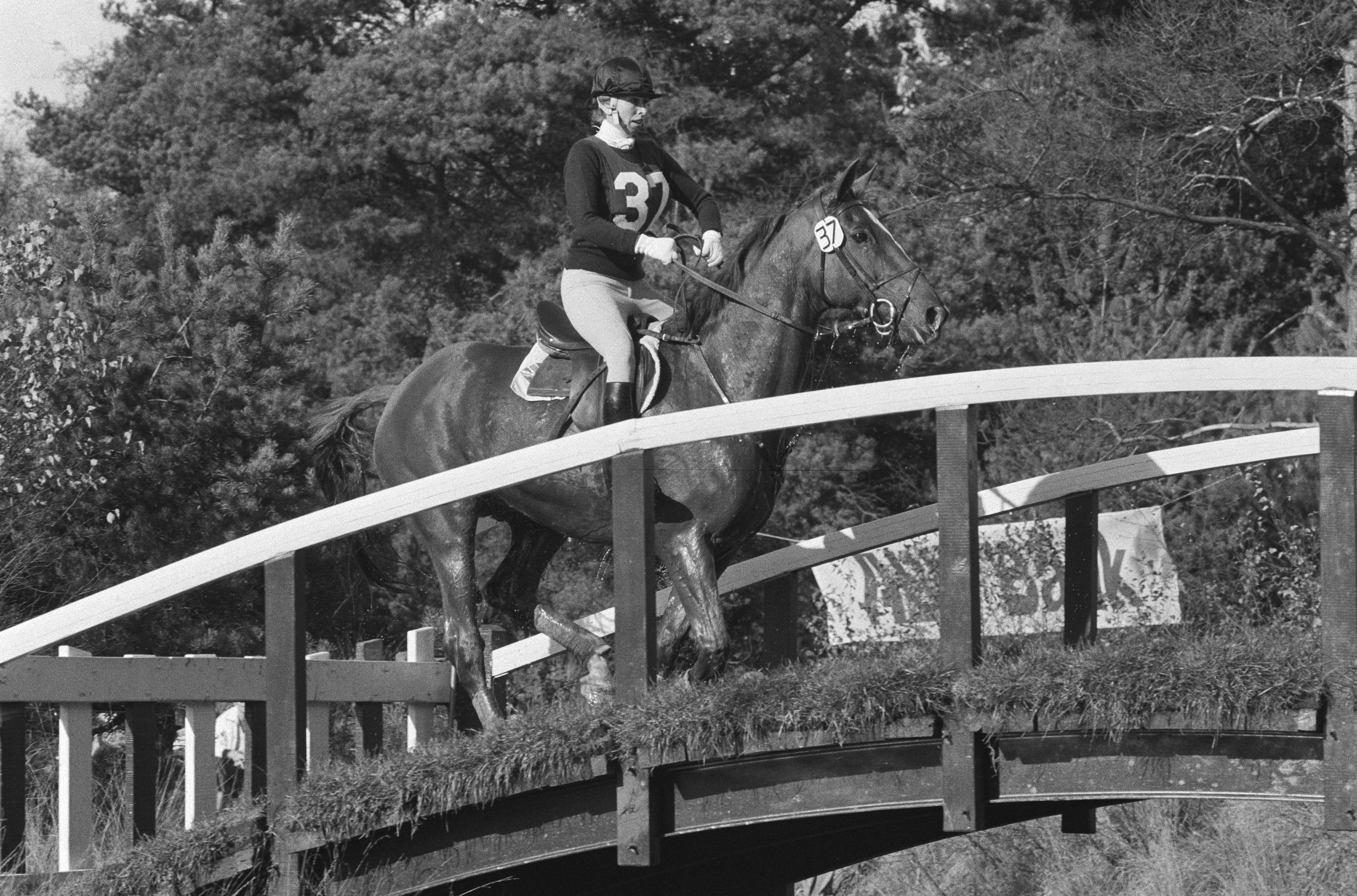
Anne riding at an event in the Netherlands (1980)

For more than five years, Anne competed with the British eventing team, winning silver medals in both the individual and team disciplines at the 1975 European Eventing Championship. The following year, she took part in the 1976 Olympic Games in Montreal as a member of the British team, riding the Queen's horse Goodwill in Eventing. Anne suffered a concussion halfway through the cross-country course but remounted and completed the event; she later stated that she had no memory of making the remaining jumps. The British team subsequently withdrew from the competition after two horses were injured. She finished fourth at the Badminton Horse Trials in 1974 and sixth in 1979, having competed in the event five times between 1971 and 1979. In 1985, she rode in a charity race at the Epsom Derby, finishing fourth.

Anne served as president of the Fédération Équestre Internationale from 1986 until 1994. On 5 February 1987, she became the first member of the royal family to appear as a contestant on a television quiz show when she took part in the BBC panel game A Question of Sport. She has been a patron of the Riding for the Disabled Association since 1971 and became its president in 1985, a role she continues to hold.

In June 2024, Anne was treated at Southmead Hospital in Bristol for minor injuries and concussion, which were believed to have resulted from contact with a horse.

== Personal life ==
In 1970, Anne briefly had a relationship with Andrew Parker Bowles, who later married Camilla Shand. Camilla subsequently became the second wife and queen consort of Anne's elder brother, Charles III. Anne was also briefly linked to the Olympic equestrian Richard Meade.

=== Marriage to Mark Phillips ===
Anne met Mark Phillips, a lieutenant in the 1st Queen's Dragoon Guards, in 1968 at a party for horse enthusiasts. Their engagement was announced on 29 May 1973. On 14 November 1973, the couple married at Westminster Abbey in a televised ceremony watched by an estimated 100 million people. They subsequently took up residence at Gatcombe Park. Media reports stated that Phillips was offered an earldom, as was then customary for untitled men marrying into the royal family, but he and Anne declined the honour. As a result, their children were born without titles. (Note: As female-line descendants of royalty, the children have no title despite being the grandchildren of a monarch. (They are not the only children of a British princess without titles; the children of Princess Alexandra, the Queen's cousin, are also untitled.)) The couple had two children: Peter (born 1977) and Zara Phillips (born 1981). Anne and Phillips have five grandchildren.

On 31 August 1989, Anne and Phillips announced their intention to separate; the couple had been rarely seen together in public, and both had been romantically linked with other people. They shared custody of their children and initially stated that "there were no plans for divorce." On 13 April 1992, the Palace announced that Anne had filed for divorce, which was finalised ten days later.

=== Marriage to Sir Timothy Laurence ===
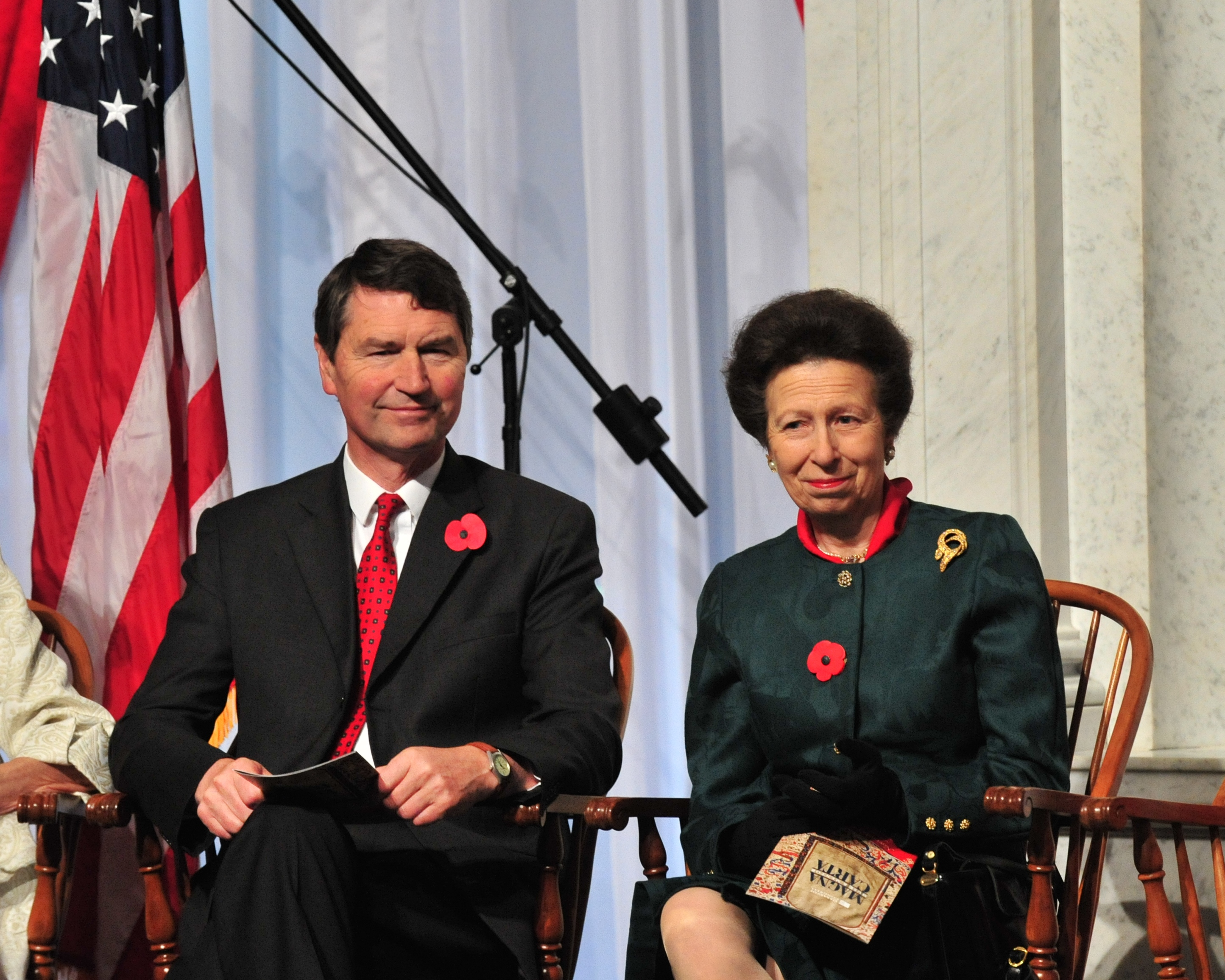
Anne with her second husband, Vice Admiral Sir Timothy Laurence (2014)

Anne met Timothy Laurence, a commander in the Royal Navy, while he was serving on the Royal Yacht Britannia. Their relationship developed in early 1989, three years after Laurence had been appointed an equerry to the Queen. In 1989, the existence of private letters from Laurence to Anne was revealed by The Sun newspaper. The couple married at Crathie Kirk, near Balmoral Castle in Scotland, on 12 December 1992. The ceremony was conducted by Molly Croll, the local Ballater registrar. Approximately 30 guests attended the private service. Unlike the Church of England at the time, the Church of Scotland did not regard marriage as a binding sacrament and therefore permitted the remarriage of divorced persons under certain circumstances.

For the wedding, Anne wore a white jacket over a "demure, cropped-to-the-knee dress" and a spray of white flowers in her hair. Her engagement ring was described as "a cabochon sapphire flanked by three small diamonds on each side". After the ceremony, the couple and their guests travelled to Craigowan Lodge for a private reception. Laurence did not receive a peerage, although he was knighted in 2011.

== Kidnapping attempt ==
On 20 March 1974, Anne and Mark Phillips were returning to Buckingham Palace when a car forced their Rolls-Royce to stop on Pall Mall. The car's driver, Ian Ball, jumped out and began firing a pistol. Inspector James Beaton, Anne's personal protection officer, left the car to shield her and attempted to disarm Ball. Beaton's Walther PPK jammed, and he was shot, as was Anne's chauffeur, Alex Callender, when he tried to intervene. Brian McConnell, a nearby tabloid journalist, also attempted to help and was shot in the chest. Ball approached Anne's car and told her that he intended to kidnap her and hold her for ransom, the amount reported variously as £2 million or £3 million, which he claimed he intended to donate to the National Health Service. When Ball ordered Anne to get out of the car, she replied, "Not bloody likely!" She reportedly considered striking him. In 1983, she discussed the incident on Parkinson, saying she had been 'scrupulously polite' to Ball because she thought it would be "silly to be too rude at that stage".

Anne eventually exited from the opposite side of the limousine, as did her lady-in-waiting, Rowena Brassey. A passing pedestrian, former boxer Ron Russell, punched Ball and led Anne away from the scene. Police Constable Michael Hills then arrived; he too was shot, but had already called assistance. Detective Constable Peter Edmonds responded, pursued Ball, and arrested him. Beaton, who had been Anne's sole bodyguard, later reflected on royal security at the time, saying "I had nothing… There was no back-up vehicle. The training was non-existent; but then again, [we thought] nothing was going to happen. They are highly specialised now, highly trained." Following the attack, the practice of assigning only a single protection officer was ended, and the Walther PPK was replaced.

Beaton, Hills, Callender, and McConnell were hospitalised and recovered from their injuries. For his defence of Anne, Beaton was awarded the George Cross by the Queen, who was visiting Indonesia when the incident occurred; Hills and Russell were awarded the George Medal, and Callender, McConnell, and Edmonds were awarded the Queen's Gallantry Medal. Anne visited Beaton in hospital to thank him. It was widely reported that the Queen paid off Russell's mortgage, but this was untrue: Russell stated in 2020 that a police officer had suggested it might happen, leading him to stop making payments and nearly lose his home after four months.

Ball pleaded guilty to attempted murder and kidnapping. After being diagnosed with schizophrenia, he was detained in mental hospitals for 45 years and released in 2019. In 2025, he claimed innocence, stating that the attempt had been intended to fail as part of a stunt. The attempted kidnapping is the subject of the Granada Television docudrama To Kidnap a Princess (2006) and inspired storylines in Tom Clancy's novel Patriot Games.

== Activities ==
=== Public appearances ===
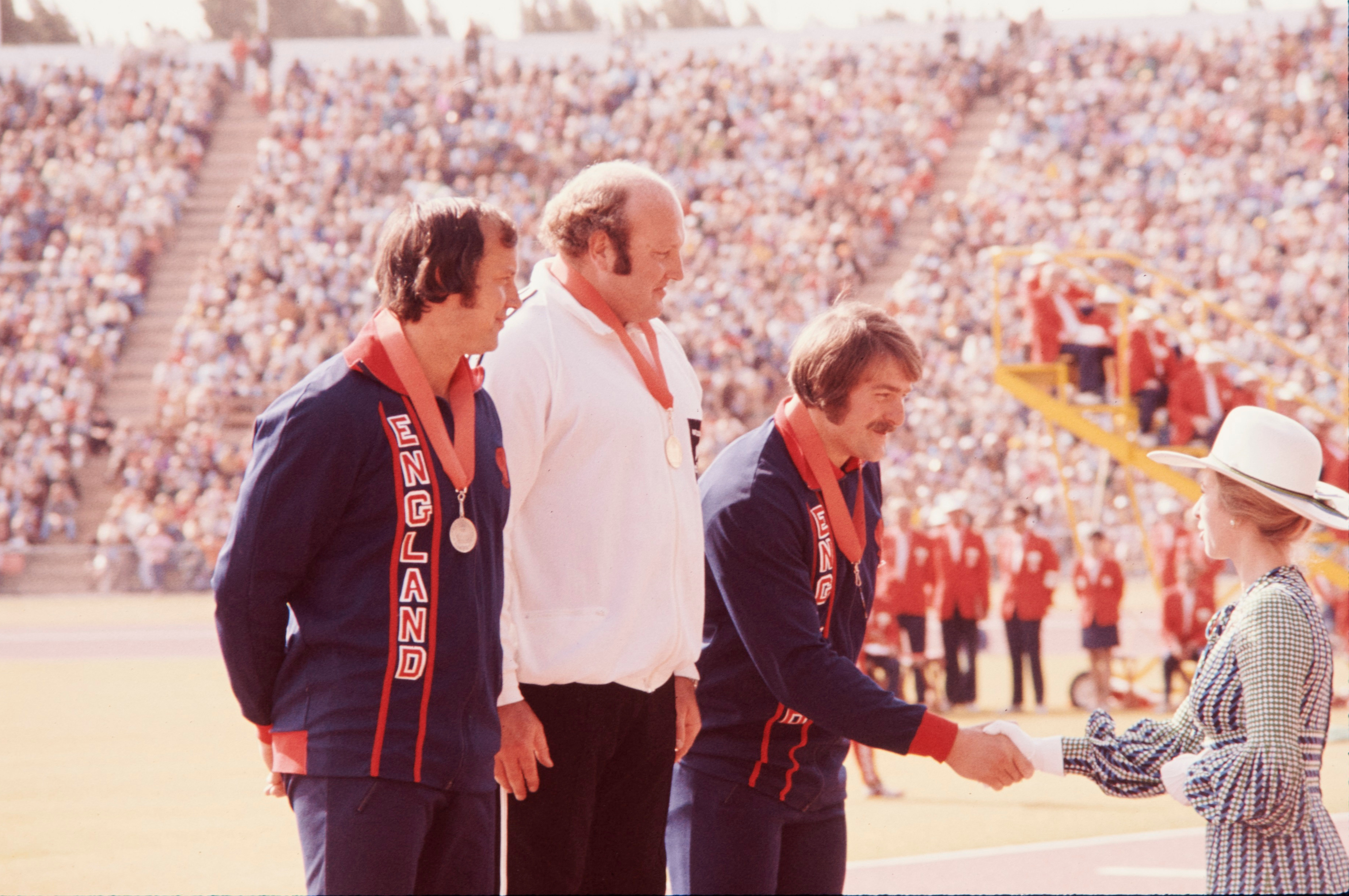
Anne at the 1974 British Commonwealth Games in Christchurch, New Zealand

Anne undertakes a wide range of duties and engagements on behalf of the sovereign. Kevin S. MacLeod, the then Canadian Secretary to the Queen, said of her in 2014: "Her credo is, 'Keep me busy. I'm here to work. I'm here to do good things. I'm here to meet as many people as possible'." In December 2017, it was reported that Anne had carried out the most official engagements that year of any member of the royal family, including the Queen. Among her overseas visits, she has toured Norway, Jamaica, Germany, Austria, New Zealand, and Australia.

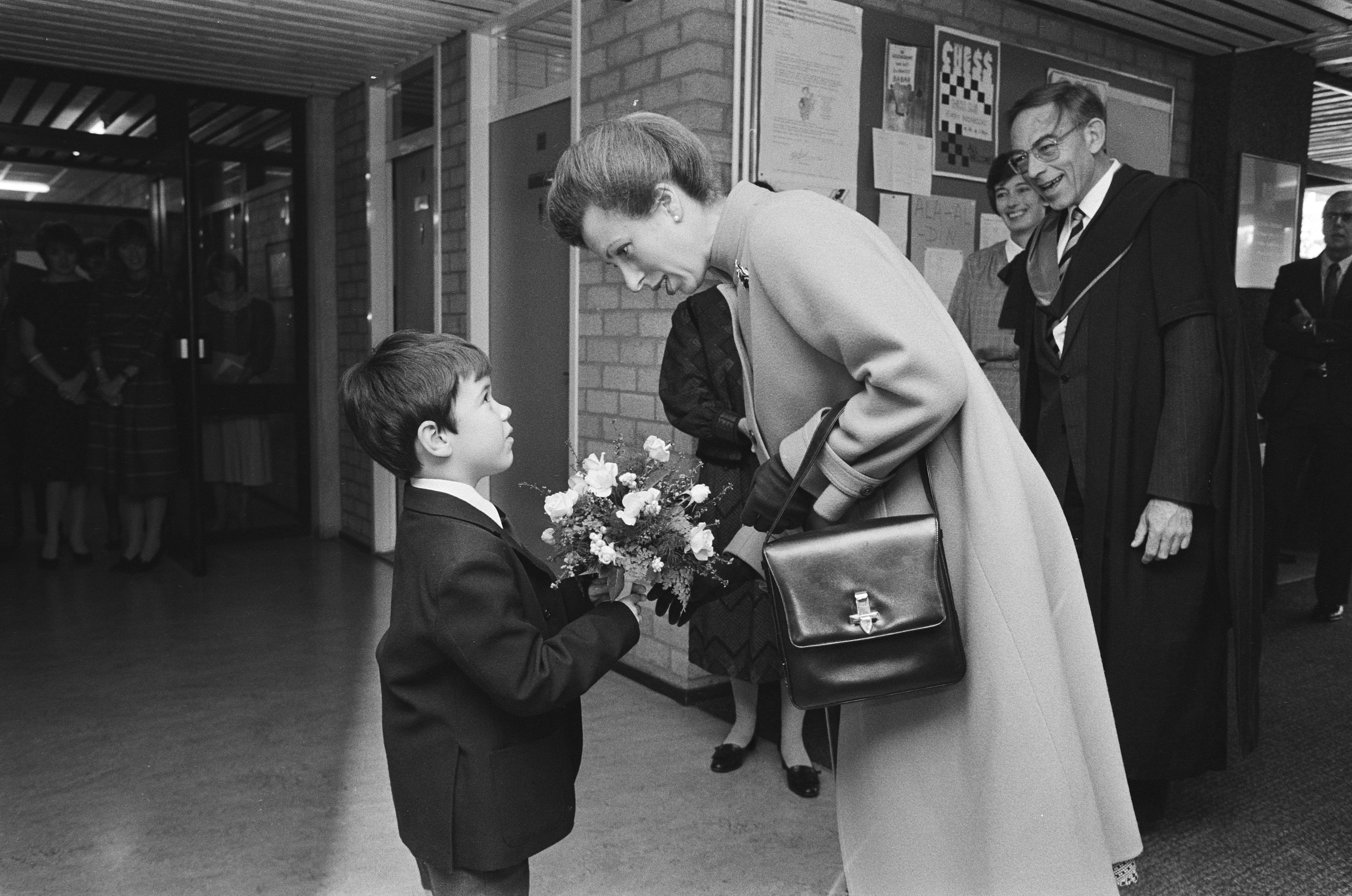
Anne visiting the British School in the Netherlands in The Hague, 1984

Anne's first public engagement took place in 1969, when she opened an educational and training centre in Shropshire. She travels abroad on behalf of the United Kingdom up to three times a year. She began undertaking overseas visits after leaving secondary school, and accompanied her parents on a state visit to Austria in the same year. Her first tour of Australia was with her parents in 1970, and she has returned many times since to carry out official engagements as colonel-in-chief of an Australian regiment, or to attend memorials and services, including the National Memorial Service for victims of the Black Saturday bushfires in Melbourne on 22 February 2009. In 1990, she became the first member of the royal family to make an official visit to the Soviet Union, travelling there as a guest of President Mikhail Gorbachev and his government.

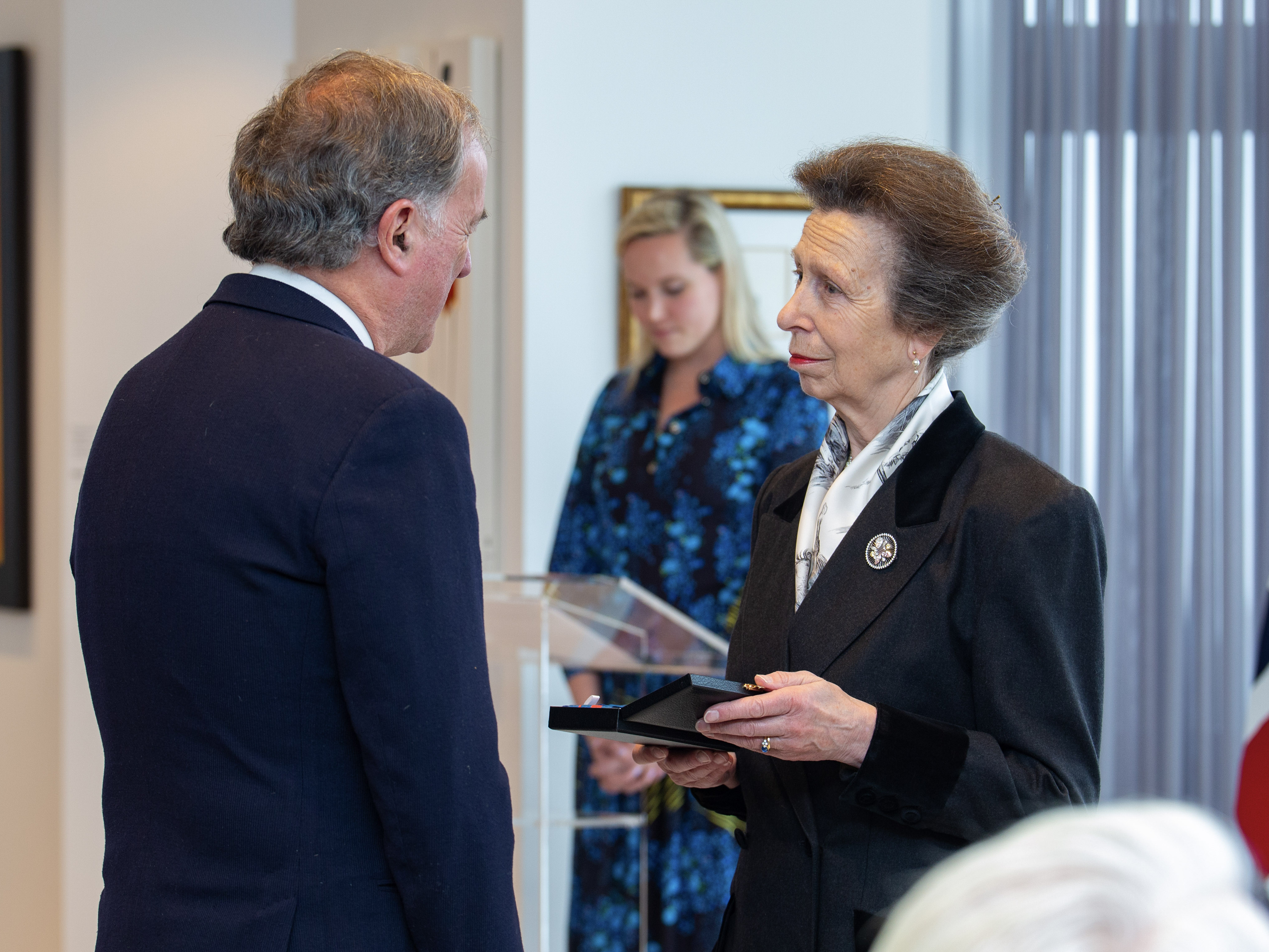
Anne hosting an investiture ceremony at the residence of the British Consul General, October 2022

In August 2016, Anne returned to Russia to visit the city of Arkhangelsk for the 75th anniversary of Operation Dervish, one of the first Arctic convoys of World War II. The following month, she developed a chest infection and was required to cancel official engagements. In late October 2016, she undertook a two-day study tour of the Malaysian state of Sarawak. In April 2022, Anne and her husband toured Australia and Papua New Guinea to mark the Queen's Platinum Jubilee. On 12 September 2022, at St Giles' Cathedral in Edinburgh, Anne became the first woman to participate in a Vigil of the Princes, standing guard by her mother's coffin. She repeated the vigil at Westminster Hall on 16 September. It was later revealed that she had been the informant at her mother's death at Balmoral, signing the death certificate alongside the attending doctor. In October 2025, she visited Kyiv, Ukraine, and met with President Volodymyr Zelenskyy, First Lady Olena Zelenska, female police and military personnel, families at the Child Rights Protection Centre, and injured war veterans at a rehabilitation centre. On 21 April 2026, Anne opened the Queen Elizabeth II Garden on the centenary of her mother's birth.

=== Patronages ===
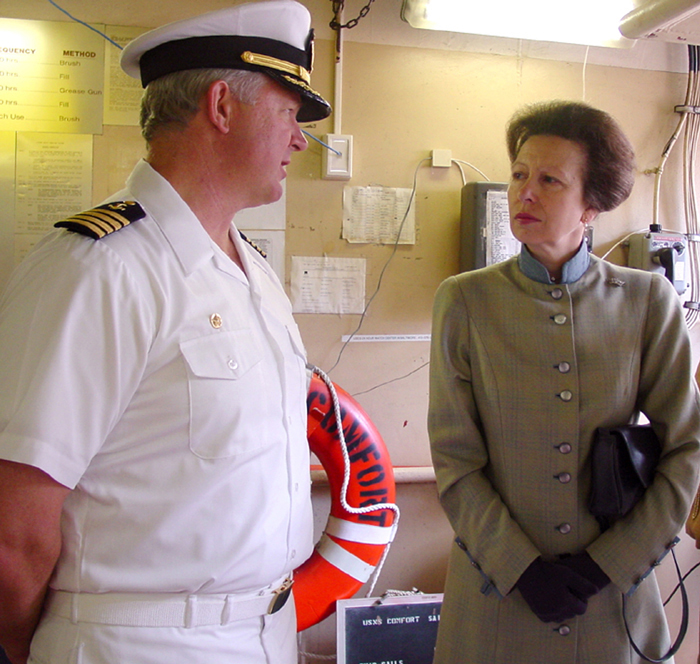
Anne visits USNS Comfort on 11 July 2002, while the vessel docked at Southampton.

Anne is involved with more than 200 charities and organisations in an official capacity. She works extensively with Save the Children, serving as its president from 1970 to 2017 and as patron since 2017. She has visited the organisation's projects in Bangladesh, Sierra Leone, South Africa, Mozambique, Ethiopia, and Bosnia and Herzegovina. In recognition of her humanitarian work, she was nominated for the Nobel Peace Prize in 1990 by Kenneth Kaunda, President of Zambia. She founded The Princess Royal Trust for Carers in 1991. Her long-standing work for St. John Ambulance as Commandant-in-Chief of St. John Ambulance Cadets has supported the development of many young people, and she attends the annual Grand Prior Award Reception. She is also patron of St. Andrew's First Aid. In 2021, she became patron of Mercy Ships, an international charity that operates the world's largest non-governmental hospital ships.

Anne serves as a British representative in the International Olympic Committee as an administrator and as a member of the London Organising Committee for the Olympic Games. She is president of the British Olympic Association and represented Great Britain on the International Olympic Committee at the 2014 Sochi Winter Olympics in Russia. In 1985, she became president of the Riding for the Disabled Association after serving as its patron for fourteen years. She maintains a close relationship with student sport and is patron of British Universities and Colleges Sport.

Following the retirement of the Queen Mother in 1981, Anne was elected by graduates of the University of London as Chancellor, a position she has held since that year. She served as president of BAFTA from 1973 to 2001. Throughout May 1996, she served as Her Majesty's High Commissioner to the General Assembly of the Church of Scotland, and held the post again in 2017. In 2007, she was appointed by the Queen as Grand Master of the Royal Victorian Order, a role previously held by her grandmother. She is a Royal Fellow of both the Royal Society and the Academy of Medical Sciences, becoming the latter's first Royal Fellow. As of 2022, the Royal Society has four Royal Fellows: Anne; William, Prince of Wales; Edward, Duke of Kent; and King Charles.

Anne was elected Chancellor of the University of Edinburgh with effect from 31 March 2011, succeeding her father, who stepped down in 2010. Also in 2011, she became president of City and Guilds of London Institute, Master of the Corporation of Trinity House, and president of the Royal Society of Arts, all in succession to her father. She has long served as president of the Commonwealth Study Conference, an initiative founded by him. In 2023, she succeeded the Duke of Kent as president of the Commonwealth War Graves Commission.

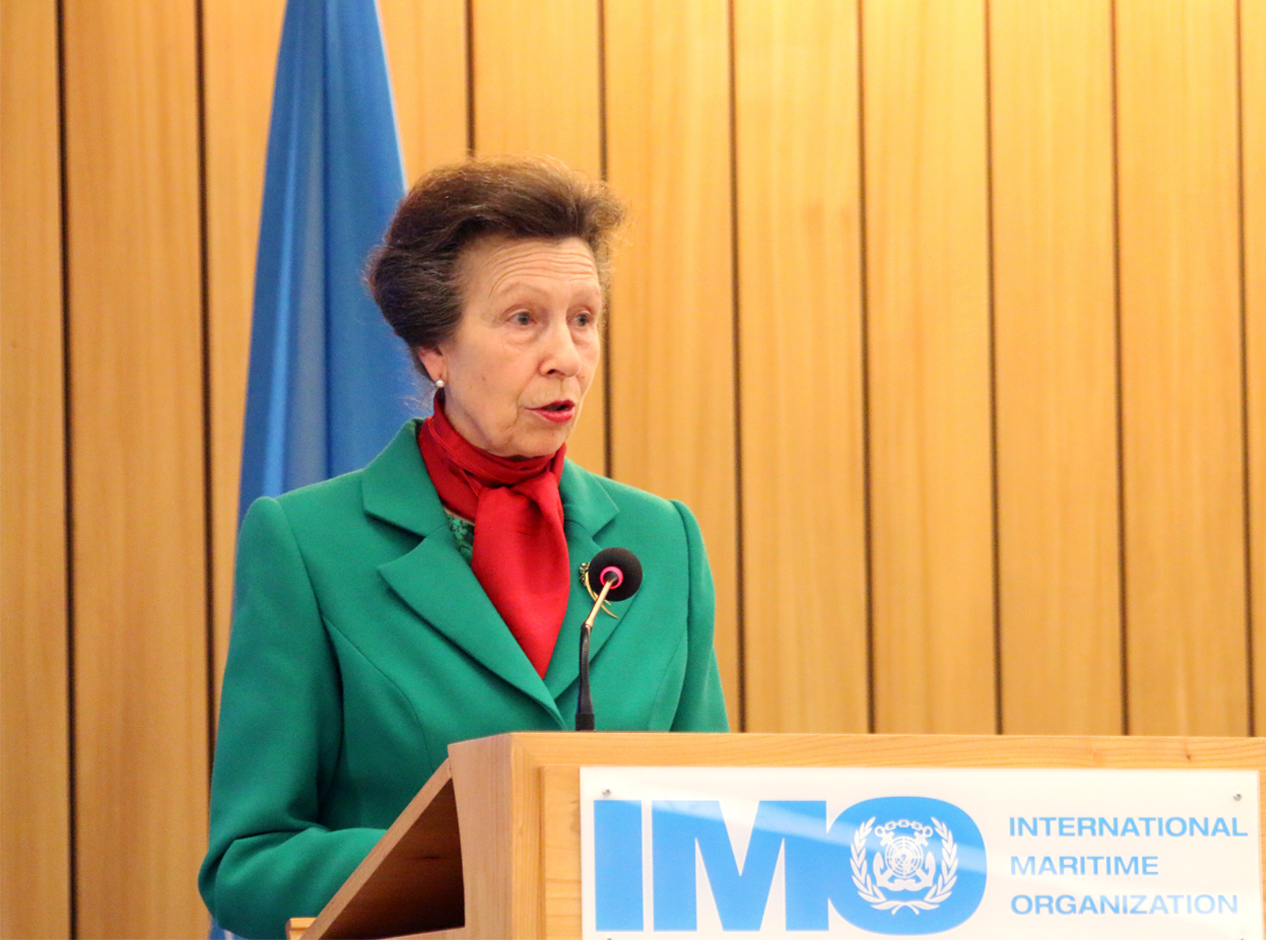
Anne speaking at the 100th Maritime Safety Committee session, December 2018

Anne is the patron of Transaid, a charity founded by Save the Children and the Chartered Institute of Logistics and Transport that aims to provide safe and sustainable transport in developing countries. She is also the patron of WISE, an organisation that encourages young women to pursue careers in science, engineering, and construction. She has been patron of the Royal National Children's Foundation since 2002, and of the industrial heritage museum, Aerospace Bristol since 2016. In 2022, Anne was named honorary chair of National Lighthouse Museum's Illuminating Future Generations campaign, a project established to raise funds for the museum's gallery space. She is also patron of the Royal College of Occupational Therapists, the Special Forces Club, Royal College of Midwives, Royal College of Emergency Medicine, Magpas Air Ambulance, Edinburgh University's Royal (Dick) School of Veterinary Studies, Royal Holloway, University of London, International Students House, London, Acid Survivors Trust International, Townswomen's Guilds, Citizens Advice, the Royal Edinburgh Military Tattoo, the Scottish Rugby Union, and the Royal Society of Arts, Manufactures and Commerce.

In 1986, she was appointed Master of the Worshipful Company of Carmen. In 2001, she became Master of the Worshipful Company of Farmers. In 2017, Anne became Prime Warden of the Worshipful Company of Fishmongers and a Governor of Gresham's School. In 2025, she was announced as patron of Friends of the Elderly, taking on the role previously held by Queen Elizabeth II for more than 60 years.

== Public image and style ==
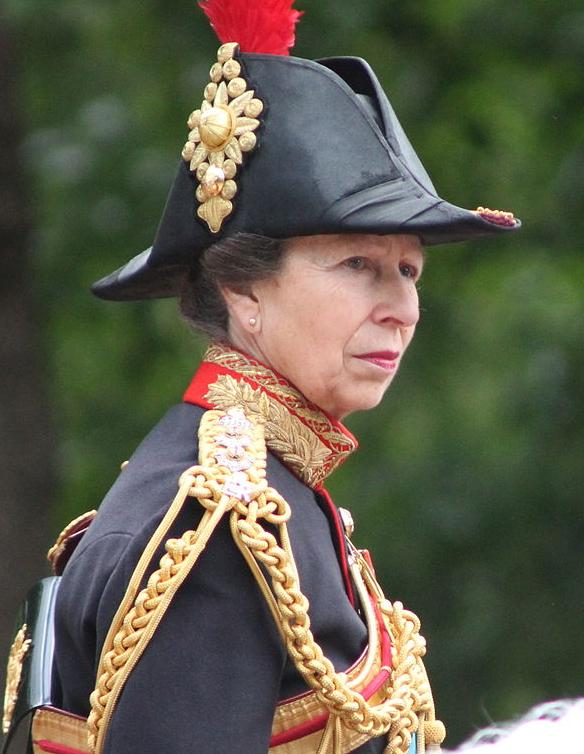
Anne is one of the few women in the royal family who regularly wears a military uniform.

Anne has been described as the royal family's "trustiest anchor" and a "beacon of good, old-fashioned public service" and has carried out more than 20,000 engagements since her 18th birthday. In her early adulthood, she was characterised as a "royal renegade" for choosing to forgo titles for her children despite being the "spare to the heir". The media often labelled the young Anne "aloof" and "haughty", earning her the nickname "her royal rudeness". She attracted controversy in 1982 when she told photographers to "naff off" at the Badminton Horse Trials. Vanity Fair wrote that Anne "has a reputation for having inherited her father's famously sharp tongue and waspish wit". Reflecting on her early public role, she said: "It's not just about 'can I get a tick in the box for doing this?' No, it's about serving… It took me probably 10 years before I really felt confident enough to contribute to Save the Children's public debates because you needed to understand how it works on the ground and that needed a very wide coverage. So my early trips were really important." She has frequently been named the "hardest working royal", and carried out 11,088 engagements between 2002 and 2022, more than any other member of the royal family.

Anne remains one of Britain's most popular royals. Telegraph editor Camilla Tominey has called her a "national treasure", describing her as "one of the great English eccentrics", whose work ethic underpins her public regard. Tominey wrote that Anne's public role is a "contradiction of both protocol taskmaster and occasional rule-breaker". Anne reportedly "insists on doing her own make-up and hair" and sometimes drives herself to engagements, having pleaded guilty to two separate speeding offences after running late. In 1974, she became the first member of the royal family to hold an HGV licence, later saying "I was considering earning my living by driving, and with my HGV licence, I don't mind spending time on my own behind the wheel". She does not shake hands with the public during walkabouts, explaining, "the theory was that you couldn't shake hands with everybody, so don't start." Members of the public have seen her "mending fences at Gatcombe" and "queuing up for the Portaloos" at her daughter's horse competitions. Her reputation is also linked to her advocacy for causes outside the mainstream, such as Wetwheels Foundation's commitment to accessible sailing and the National Lighthouse Museum. On her 60th and 70th birthdays, both the BBC and Vanity Fair asked whether she intended to retire; she denied it on both occasions, citing her parents' example and her commitment to her duty. Her public personality has been described as "not suffering fools lightly" while maintaining a "still-impressive level of grace and courtesy".

British Vogue editor Edward Enninful has said that "Princess Anne is a true style icon and was all about sustainable fashion before the rest of us really knew what that meant". Her style has been noted for its timelessness; she relies largely on British fashion brands, with tweed and tailored suits as her hallmarks. She is known for recycling outfits, including a floral-print dress worn both to the wedding of the Prince of Wales in 1981 and the wedding of Lady Rose Windsor in 2008. Anne is patron of the UK Fashion and Textile Association. She has been noted for wearing "bold patterns and vibrant pops of colour". Her clothing choices often reflect her equestrian interests and the practicality required by her fast-paced schedule. In the 1970s and 1980s, she was frequently photographed in trends such as puff sleeves, cardigans, bright floral patterns, and multicoloured stripes. She is also one of the few women in the royal family to wear a military uniform. According to The Guardian, she is "rarely seen without a brooch" at royal events. Her millinery has included jockey caps and hats in multiple colours and bold patterns. She presented the Queen Elizabeth II award for British design at London Fashion Week in 2020. Anne has appeared on three British Vogue covers: the September 1971 issue at age 21, and the May and November 1973 issues marking her engagement to Mark Phillips. She was featured in the cover story of the May 2020 issue of Vanity Fair. In 2024, Tatler included her among the most glamorous European royals.

Anne is the first member of the royal family to have been convicted of a criminal offence. In November 2002, she pleaded guilty to one charge of having a dog dangerously out of control, an offence under the Dangerous Dogs Act 1991, and was fined £500.

== Titles, styles, honours and arms ==
Monogram of Princess Anne

=== Titles and styles ===
Anne is the seventh Princess Royal, an appellation granted only to the eldest daughter of the Sovereign. The previous holder was Princess Mary, Countess of Harewood, the daughter of King George V and Anne's great-aunt.

=== Honours ===
Anne is a Royal Knight Companion of the Most Noble Order of the Garter, (Note: The official website of the royal family previously described her as a "Lady of the Most Noble Order of the Garter" and a "Royal Lady of the Most Ancient and Most Noble Order of the Thistle".) an Extra Knight of the Most Ancient and Most Noble Order of the Thistle, Grand Master and Dame Grand Cross of the Royal Victorian Order, and a Dame Grand Cross of the Most Venerable Order of the Hospital of St John of Jerusalem. She is a recipient of the Royal Family Order of Elizabeth II, the Royal Family Order of Charles III, and serves as a Personal Aide-de-Camp to the Sovereign.

=== Arms ===
Coat of arms of the Princess Royal
Notes The Princess Royal's personal arms are those of the Sovereign in right of the United Kingdom with a label for difference. Adopted 1962 Coronet The Coronet of a daughter of the Sovereign Proper. Escutcheon Quarterly 1st and 4th, Gules three Lions passant guardant Or; 2nd, Or a Lion rampant Gules within a Double-tressure flory counterflory Gules; 3rd, Azure a Harp Or stringed Argent. Supporters Dexter, a Lion rampant guardant Or imperially crowned Proper; sinister, a Unicorn Argent, armed, crined and unguled Or, gorged with a Coronet Or composed of Crosses patées and Fleurs-de-lis a Chain affixed thereto passing between the forelegs and reflexed over the back also Or. Orders The Garter circlet: HONI SOIT QUI MAL Y PENSE (Shame be to him who thinks evil of it), and in Chief, as an augmentation of honour, the arms of the Order of St John. Other elements The whole differenced by a label of three points Argent, first and third charged with a St George's Cross the second with a Heart Gules. Banner The Royal Standard of the United Kingdom labelled for difference as in her arms. (in Scotland) (in Canada: since 2013, the Princess Royal has a personal heraldic flag for use in Canada. It is the Royal Arms of Canada in banner form defaced with a blue roundel surrounded by a wreath of gold maple leaves, within which is a depiction of an "A" surmounted by a coronet. Above the roundel is a white label of three points, the centre one charged with a red heart and the other two with red crosses.) In Australia: Approval for the Royal Australian Corps of Signals to carry a banner bearing the cypher of Princess Anne, Colonel-in-Chief of the Corps, was granted on 10 September 1980. The banner was designated the Princess Anne Banner. The Princess Anne Banner was formally presented to the Royal Australian Corps of Signals on 29 November 1986 at Simpson Barracks. The presentation was made on behalf of the princess by the Governor-General of Australia, Sir Ninian Stephen. Symbolism As with the Royal Arms of the United Kingdom: the first and fourth quarters are the arms of England, the second of Scotland, the third of Ireland. Other versions The Princess Royal's arms for Scotland with the Order of the Thistle collar.

== Ancestry ==
Anne's ancestry can be traced as far back as Cerdic, King of Wessex (519–534).

Ancestors of Anne, Princess Royal

8. George I of Greece
4. Prince Andrew of Greece and Denmark
9. Grand Duchess Olga Constantinovna of Russia
2. Prince Philip, Duke of Edinburgh
10. Prince Louis of Battenberg
5. Princess Alice of Battenberg
11. Princess Victoria of Hesse and by Rhine
1. Anne, Princess Royal
12. George V of the United Kingdom
6. George VI of the United Kingdom
13. Princess Victoria Mary of Teck
3. Elizabeth II of the United Kingdom
14. Claude Bowes-Lyon, 14th Earl of Strathmore and Kinghorne
7. Lady Elizabeth Bowes-Lyon
15. Cecilia Cavendish-Bentinck

== Bibliography ==
=== Author ===
- Riding Through My Life, Pelham Books, 1991, ISBN 978-0720719611

=== Forewords ===
- John Anthony Davies, The Reins of Life: Instructional and Informative Manual on Riding for the Disabled, J.A.Allen & Co Ltd, 1987, ISBN 978-0851314495
- Margaret J. Heraty, Developing World Transport, Grosvenor Press International, 1989, ISBN 978-0946027897
- Georgina Colthurst, Fighting Back, Methuen Publishing Ltd, 1990, ISBN 978-0413614605
- Peter O'Sullevan, Sean Magee, That's Racing, Stanley Paul, 1992, ISBN 978-0091771836
- Ursula Stuart Mason, Britannia's Daughters, Pen & Sword Books Ltd, 1992, ISBN 978-0850522716
- Peter Fry, VetAid Book of Veterinary Anecdotes, Vetaid, 1996, ISBN 978-0952229964
- Michael Morpurgo, More Muck and Magic, Egmont Group, 2001, ISBN 978-0749740948
- Jim Telfer, Looking Back . . . For Once, Mainstream Publishing, 2005, ISBN 978-1845961176
- Bishop Bill Down, The Bishop's Bill of Fare: A Gracious Companion, Baron, 2005, ISBN 978-0860236801
- Christopher McCreery, On Her Majesty's Service, Dundurn Press, 2008, ISBN 978-1550027426
- Geoff Holt, Walking on Water, Personal Everest Ltd, 2008, ISBN 978-1574092769
- Robert Burton, Southern Horizons: The History of the British Antarctic Territory, UK Antarctic Heritage Trust, 2008, ISBN 978-0954138912
- Moira C. Harris, Wild Horses of the World, Hamlyn, 2009, ISBN 978-0600618133
- Judy Steel, Horse Tales and Saddle Songs, Bordersprint Ltd., 2011, ISBN 978-0956107558
- Stephen Haddelsey, Operation Tabarin, The History Press, 2014 [2016], ISBN 978-0750967464
- Ian Cowe, Scottish and Manx Lighthouses: A Photographic Journey in the Footsteps of the Stevensons, Northern Lighthouse Heritage Trust, 2015, ISBN 978-0956720917
- Robyn Walker, The Women Who Spied for Britain: Female Secret Agents of the Second World War, Amberley Publishing, 2015, ISBN 978-1445645841
- Trevor Boult, In Fingal's Wake: A Tender Tribute, Amberley Publishing, 2016, ISBN 978-1445648064
- Polly Williamson, Where did I go?, Cheltenham Printing, 2017, ISBN 978-0993179976
- Anne Glyn-Jones, Morse Code Wrens of Station X: Bletchley's Outer Circle, Amphora Press, 2017, ISBN 978-1845409081
- Trevor Boult, To Sea for Science, distributed by Lily Publications, 2021, ISBN 978-1838084530
- Ian Robertson, Wooden Spoon Rugby World 2021: 25 Years of Rugby Memories, G2 Entertainment Ltd, 2021, ISBN 978-1782816065
- Robin Fletcher, Pass the Pig's Bladder, 2022, ISBN 978-1739122416
- Christopher Nicholson, Rock Lighthouses of Britain & Ireland, Whittles Publishing, 2022, ISBN 978-1849955447

=== Lectures ===
- What is Punishment for and How Does it Relate to the Concept of Community?, 1990

=== Guest-editor ===
- "HRH The Princess Royal: Guest Editor". Country Life. 29 July 2020.

== Notes ==
Anne, Princess Royal House of Windsor Born: 15 August 1950
Lines of succession
Preceded by Lady Louise Mountbatten-Windsor	Line of succession to the British throne 19th in line	Followed by Peter Phillips
British royalty
Vacant Title last held by Princess Mary, Countess of Harewood	Princess Royal; 1987–present	Incumbent
Academic offices
Preceded by Queen Elizabeth the Queen Mother	Chancellor of the University of London; 1981–present	Incumbent
Preceded by The Duke of Edinburgh	Chancellor of the University of Edinburgh; 2011–present	Incumbent
New creation	Chancellor of the University of the Highlands and Islands; 2012–present	Incumbent
New creation	Chancellor of Harper Adams University; 2013–present	Incumbent
New creation	Chancellor of Health Sciences University; 2024–present	Incumbent
Honorary titles
Preceded by Queen Elizabeth the Queen Mother	Grand Master of the Royal Victorian Order; 2007–present	Incumbent
Preceded by Henry Cooper	BBC Sports Personality of the Year; 1971	Succeeded by Mary Peters
Orders of precedence in the United Kingdom
Preceded by The Duchess of Edinburgh	Ladies; HRH The Princess Royal	Followed by Harriet Phillips
