= Doublet (horse) =

Eventing horse

- Breed: Thoroughbred cross
- Sire: Doubtless
- Dam: Swaté
- Sex: Gelding
- Foaled: 1963
- Owner: Princess Anne
- Trainer: Alison Oliver

Doublet (1963 – 1974) was a Thoroughbred cross gelding. Doublet was a successful performer in the sport of Eventing, in which he was the regular mount of Princess Anne. Doublet was ridden by Princess Anne when winning the gold medal in the 1971 European Eventing Championship.

== Beginning ==
Doublet was a gelding presented to Princess Anne as a gift from her mother, Queen Elizabeth II. He was sired by the Argentinian Thoroughbred stallion Doubtless out of a non-Thoroughbred mare named Swaté.

== Activity ==
His trainer was Alison Oliver.

On 27 March 1971, the gelding threw Princess Anne.

He won gold at the European three-day eventing championships, in Burghley with Princess Anne on 4 September 1971, and finished fifth at the Badminton Horse Trials in the same year.

In 1973, Princess Anne used another horse, Goodwill, at the European Equestrian Championships in Kiev after Doublet struggled at the Osberton Trials earlier that year.

== Death ==
On 13 May 1974, while training on the grounds of Windsor Castle, Doublet suffered a broken leg and was euthanized.
