= Pierre Jean Louis Ovide Doublet =

French politician and writer

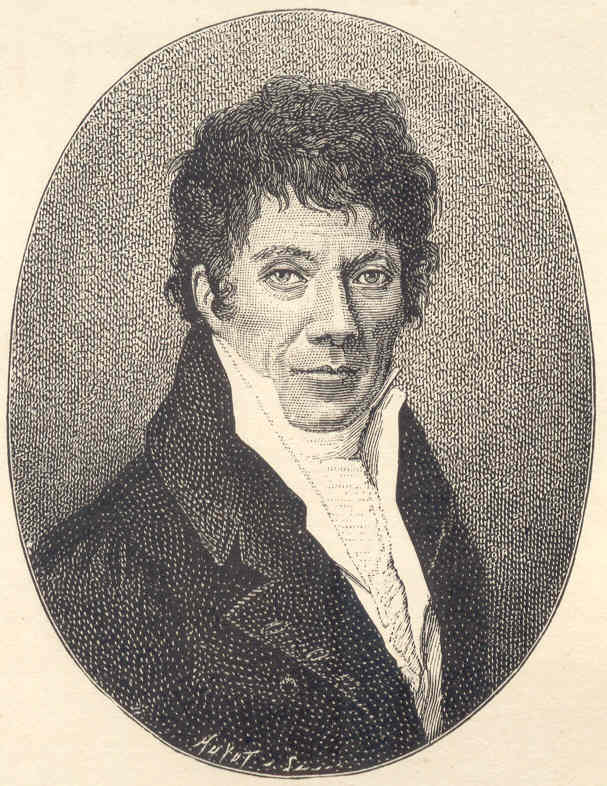
- Pierre Jean Louis Ovide Doublet

Commissioner of Malta
- In office 10 November 1799 – 5 September 1800
- Preceded by: Regnaud de Saint-Jean d'Angély
- Succeeded by: Sir Alexander Ball

Personal details
- Born: 25 August 1749 Beaugency, France
- Died: 4 February 1824 (aged 74) Valletta, Malta
- Spouse: Elizabetta Magri
- Children: Vincenzo Doublet; Maria Doublet; Regina Doublet; Magdelena Doublet; Joanna Doublet; Romualdus Doublet; Francesca Doublet; Giuseppe Doublet

Pierre Jean Louis Ovide Doublet (25 August 1749 – 4 February 1824) was a French politician and writer. He spent much of his life serving in the Knights of Malta. Following his enlistment as a soldier, he entered the service of the French Secretariat of the Knights and was eventually promoted to the leadership of the Secretariat.

Doublet participated in the negotiations for the surrender of the Knights when Malta was captured by Napoleon in 1798. Grand Master Ferdinand von Hompesch zu Bolheim had failed to bolster Valletta's defenses against the French fleet and had peacefully admitted some French ships to the harbor, leading to the island's capture. Doublet, being in the Grand Master's direct service, was accused as a collaborator with the French and became caught in the political maneuvering by other members to depose Hompesch.

Doublet stayed in Malta during the French occupation, serving as Secretary General to the Commission of Government installed by Napoleon and later becoming Commissioner of Malta. He was exiled to France when the island became a British Dominion in 1800 and wrote a book about his experiences in Malta. Doublet remained in exile for most of his life, though he was allowed to make a permanent return soon before his death.

== The early years (1749–1781) ==
Pierre Jean Louis Ovide Doublet, the son of a gardener Jean Doublet and his wife Jeanne Desire, was born in Beaugency, within 20 kilometres (12 mi) of Orléans, France. On 19 June 1779, he enlisted as a soldier to the Infantry Regiment of the Order of Malta and reached the rank of premier sergeant (first sergeant) in November 1782.

== Career in the Order of Malta (1781–1798) ==
In 1781, he also entered the service of the French Secretariat of Grand Master de Rohan (the Order also included two other secretariats, Spanish and Italian), with the title of under-secretary of its Commanderies.

His qualities were quickly recognised and on 6 October 1783 he was rewarded by affiliation to the Order as confratello or donato; the Donat of Devotion was a rank within the Order recognising individuals for the services they provided. He also received the privilege of wearing the “croix” with six points in gold and enamel in his buttonhole and in white linen sewn on his coat. Moreover, he acquired the right to enjoy pensions from any commanderies in the appointment of the Grand Master, a privilege usually reserved for commanders of the Order.

His Bull of reception is recorded with the Chancery of the Order on 14 October 1783.

The following year, on proposal of the baillif d'Almeida and the listener Bruno, he was offered promotion to the rank of conventual chaplain. He had already formed prospects for marriage which obliged him to refuse: the conventual chaplains, like the knights, made vows of chastity. On 19 April 1784, against the will of his hierarchy and in semi-secrecy, he married a young Maltese woman of modest origin, Elizabetta Magri, also known as Bettina.

In his final position in the Order, as Head of the French Secretariat, he served under the successive reigns of two Grand Masters. The first, Emmanuel de Rohan by whom he was protected then, after the death of de Rohan in 1797, his successor Ferdinand Von Hompesch.

Within the framework of his functions, he was particularly closely associated with the creation of the Grand Priory of Russia which replaced the Priory of Poland after the division of this country.

He was also a "Brother" of the Masonic Lodge in Malta (St. John's Lodge of Secrecy and Harmony) which had obtained an English warrant. The Bailiff (Count) Fra’ Giulio Litta, was greatly involved in the creation of the Grand Priory of Russia, was by chance, also member of this same lodge, entirely under the benevolent indifference of the Grand-Master de Rohan (himself initiated in Modane in 1756).

== French Occupation of Malta (1798–1800) ==
In June 1798, at the time of the capture of Malta by Napoleon Bonaparte en route to his expedition of Egypt, part of the Mediterranean campaign of 1798, Doublet formed part of the delegation which negotiated the terms for the surrender of the Order on board Orient, Napoleon's flagship. He intervened when negotiating the amount of the allowance allocated to the Grand Master. Pointing out that the proposed amount appeared insufficient to him, Napoleon's only retort was to address the problem directly to the Republic. As he had with the other Frenchmen in the Order that he thought to be of some use to him, the General proposed Doublet accompany him to Egypt. Because of Doublet's age—he was almost 50 years old—and his family for which he was the only support, Doublet declined the proposal courteously but firmly. His refusal angered Napoleon, who did not appreciate anyone denying his will, but the future emperor confided to Junot, his aide-de-camp, that this man had good qualities because he had substance.

During the occupation of Malta by France (June 1798/September 1800), his competencies were again put to use by the French authorities because of his knowledge of the land and because he was French and thus reliable in the eyes of the occupiers. He is named as of June 1798 Secretary General to the Commission of Government installed by Napoleon at the time of his stay. On 10 November 1799 he became Commissioner to replace Regnaud de Saint Jean d'Angély who is recalled to France, a position that he remained until the surrender of Valletta on 5 September 1800. The President of this commission was another Frenchman, Citizen Jean de Bosredon de Ransijat, formerly commander of the Order and also its former treasurer.

=== Business of the Grand Master ===
Following the capture of Malta by the troops of Bonaparte and in the débacle of the Order which followed, Doublet was shown to have communicated to the French authorities the secret code that the Grand Masters Hompesch and, before him, Rohan used to safeguard their diplomatic mails. Indeed, as a sovereign order, the Order of Malta then exchanged an abundance of correspondence with the different states around Europe. Bonaparte intercepted several messages to the Order's Grand Master, and its honorary Grand Master, the Czar of Russia. Bonaparte requested the decipher code. Ferdinand von Hompesch zu Bolheim yielded to this requirement and instructed Doublet to hand over of this secret code. These letters did not bring anything that the General-in-chief did not already know except perhaps, amusing details, certain appreciations of his own person emanating from French diplomats. However, Doublet had already aroused the jealousy of several members of the order, he was von Hompesch's right-hand man, and he was of French birth. A rumour quickly circulated that charged Doublet with the entire responsibility of having delivered the cipher to the enemy. Some of his accusers even asserted that Doublet was a traitor, a secret agent on the payroll of Napoleon who had been introduced within the Order to undermine it. In a similar case, the Proclamation of St Petersburg, signed by former members of the Order in an effort to please the Czar, posited that Hompesch was incompetent and defeatist. This is also the case in a published booklet partisan with St Petersburg by an old bodyguard of the Count of Artois (the future Charles X). One can seriously doubt the objectivity of these writings insofar as their authors were obligated to the Czar, placed under his authority they tried to restart in a ridiculous and pitiful way the previous glories of a broken and deposed order. Indeed, Czar Paul I had been designated "Protector" of the Order and, after its dissolution in Malta, he tried to reconstitute it within the framework of the recently established Priory of Russia. It was thus important to discredit von Hompesch and, if unhappy with the Grand Master but still taking into account his rank, could not openly be shown to be a traitor, at the very least by deferring the crime on his closest collaborators one could make him a traitor by incompetence, weakness and breach. Besides, Tzar Paul I managed to achieve his goal since after the abdication of von Hompesch, he is proclaimed Grand Master by some of the members of the Order in exile whom he had hastened to accommodate following their expulsion from Malta (the Grand Master was not recognised by the Pope because Tzar Paul I was married and of Russian Orthodox religion). Doublet, the ex donat, shared these calumnies with Bosredon de Ransijat, another renegade in the eyes of Order.

Doublet's honour was wounded by this cabal, but more especially as he always hoped for the re-establishment of the Order and his return to Malta, Doublet protested his innocence in this business until the end of his days, innocence which will be attested to by several direct witnesses, including Matthius Poussielgue, Napoleon's finance adviser at the time of these events.

== Exile (1800–1824) ==
After the surrender of the French garrison in Valletta on 5 September 1800, the British expelled from the Maltese islands all those who collaborated with the French, expressed any sympathy with them, or accommodated them in some way. This included those who had taken an active part in the civil administration and French military, mixed French and Maltese, but also the French who had been long-term residents of Malta. Thus was the case for Pierre Manchin, a native Frenchman of Troyes in the department of Aube, living in Malta since 1749, who married there, started a family and had integrated into the Maltese population.

After passing by the Balearic Islands, Pierre Jean Louis Ovide Doublet was disembarked in Marseille, France, in December 1800. Bourrienne, private secretary of Napoleon, recalls in his own Mémoires Doublet's presence in Paris in 1802, in spite of a decree from the Directory to the Maltese refugees to remain in the departments of the Var, the Bouches-du-Rhône and in Corsica (departments of Liamone and Golo). After the Treaty of Amiens, Doublet once again believed he could settle in Malta; he returned a few times, but was exiled again when hostilities resumed between France and England.

Subsequently, his life became a long exile. He spent nine or ten years in Rome, living a precarious and penurious existence, while making brief sojourns to Malta, where he could not remain for long. He finally settled with his son in Tripoli, (Libya). In the last months of his life, he was finally permitted to return permanently to Malta and he died there soon after his return, 4 February 1824. Today, many of his descendants have been traced and are living in Malta, France, Australia, England, The Netherlands, Germany and United States. Among these one still bears the name Louis Ovide and toward the end of 19th century one was named Napoleon.

== Writing ==
Pierre Jean Louis Ovide Doublet left a book, Mémoires Historiques sur l'Invasion et l'Occupation de Malte par une Armée Française, en 1798, in which he tells of his experience. The first part is an analysis of the reign of Grand Master Emmanuel de Rohan; the second part reports the invasion and the occupation of Malta by the French. In 1832, when Sir Walter Scott wrote his work about the occupation of Malta by the French, someone presented Doublet's manuscript to him; it was not published until 1883. The father of Ivanhoe and Rob Roy will affirm he acted with good intent and left the most complete report on these events that had been given to him. This work most probably constitutes a kind of plea pro domo and some will suggest that Doublet could have portrayed himself in a more important role than in fact it actually was.
