= Jim Beaton =

British police officer

Chief Superintendent James Wallace Beaton GC CVO
- Born: 17 February 1943 (age 83); St Fergus, Aberdeenshire, Scotland
- Other name: Jim
- Police career
- Country: UK
- Allegiance: United Kingdom
- Department: Metropolitan Police
- Service years: 1962–1992
- Status: Retired
- Rank: 1962 Constable; 1966 Sergeant; 1971 Station Sergeant; 1974 Inspector; 1979 Chief Inspector; 1983 Superintendent; 1985 Chief Superintendent
- Awards: George Cross; Commander of the Royal Victorian Order

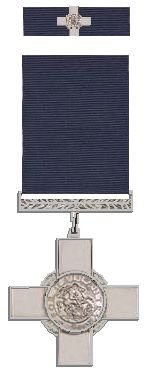
George Cross and its ribbon bar

Beaton's medal group with George Cross on display at the Imperial War Museum, London, in 2023

James Wallace Beaton, GC, CVO (born 17 February 1943) is a retired British police officer who was awarded the George Cross, Britain's highest gallantry award for civilians. He was Queen's Police Officer from 1983 to 1992.

Beaton received the George Cross in 1974 for protecting Princess Anne from the would-be kidnapper Ian Ball during an attack on The Mall, London. He received the Director's Honor Award of the United States Secret Service in the same year. He was made a Lieutenant of the Royal Victorian Order (LVO) in 1987 and promoted to Commander (CVO) in 1992.

In March 1973, Beaton was transferred to the Royalty Protection Squad, A Division, and from 14 November served as a Personal Protection Officer to Princess Anne. He was given the number 11 in the small team responsible for protecting members of the Royal Family. On 20 March 1974, the princess and her husband Captain Mark Phillips were returning to Buckingham Palace from a royal engagement. Their car was stopped in the Mall by another vehicle driven into its path. The car was driven by Ian Ball, who was later declared to be mentally ill; Ball jumped out of his vehicle and tried to force the Princess from her car. He shot and wounded the royal chauffeur, Alex Callender, and a passing journalist, Brian McConnell, who tried to assist. Beaton was shot three times, including serious wounds to the chest and abdomen, and a gunshot wound to his hand, sustained when he tried to block Ball's weapon with his own body, after his own gun had jammed. Beaton also sustained injuries to his pelvis while trying to disarm Ball. For his bravery, Beaton was awarded the George Cross; Callender and McConnell were each awarded the Queen's Gallantry Medal. Beaton remained with the Princess until February 1979.

Beaton served in the Metropolitan Police from 1962 to 1992. He spent the first years of his career as a constable on the beat at Notting Hill from 1962 to 1966. In 1966, he was promoted to sergeant at Harrow Road, and then in 1971 to Station Sergeant at Wembley. He became an inspector in 1974, while serving in Royal Protection, and was subsequently promoted to chief inspector in August 1979, superintendent in 1983, and chief superintendent in 1985.

In 1982, he became the Queen's Police Officer. He retired in 1992.

== Honours and awards ==
George Cross (GC)	26 September 1974
Commander of the Royal Victorian Order (CVO)	1992
Lieutenant of the Royal Victorian Order (LVO)	1987
Queen Elizabeth II Silver Jubilee Medal	1977
Queen Elizabeth II Golden Jubilee Medal	2002
Queen Elizabeth II Diamond Jubilee Medal	2012
Queen Elizabeth II Platinum Jubilee Medal	2022
King Charles III Coronation Medal	2023
Police Long Service and Good Conduct Medal	
