= King's Gallantry Medal =

United Kingdom decoration awarded for exemplary acts of bravery

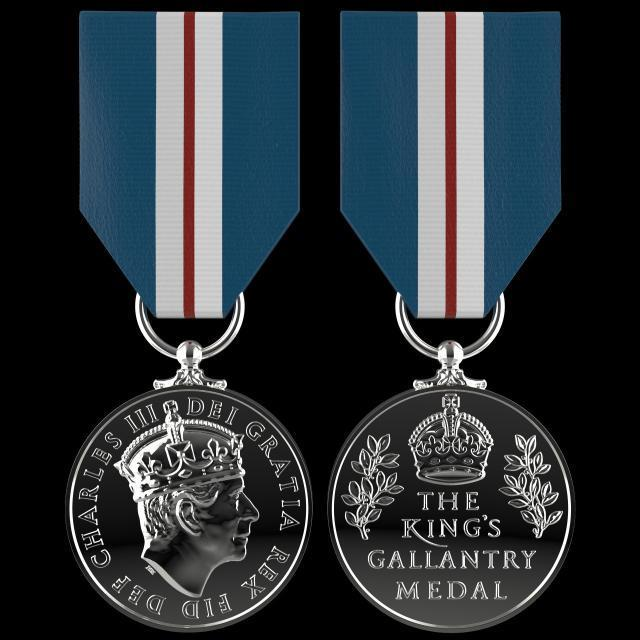
- Obverse and reverse images of the KGM
- Type: Bravery decoration
- Awarded for: "… exemplary acts of bravery."
- Description: Silver disk, 36mm diameter
- Presented by: United Kingdom
- Eligibility: British and Commonwealth
- Post-nominals: KGM
- Status: Currently awarded
- Established: 20 June 1974
- Final award: QGM: 6 March 2026

Highlights
- Total: QGM: 1,102 including 19 bars to March 2023; KGM: 9
- Total awarded posthumously: QGM: 42; KGM: 1
- Ribbon bar Silver rosette signifies a second award

Order of Wear
- Next (higher): Colonial Police Medal for Gallantry
- Next (lower): Royal Victorian Medal

The King's Gallantry Medal (KGM), formerly the Queen's Gallantry Medal (QGM), is a United Kingdom decoration awarded for exemplary acts of bravery where the services were not so outstanding as to merit the George Medal, but above the level required for the King's Commendation for Bravery.

== History ==
The Queen's Gallantry Medal was instituted on 20 June 1974 to replace the Order of the British Empire for Gallantry and the British Empire Medal for Gallantry, which ended the anomaly where the Order of the British Empire for Gallantry was awarded for lesser acts of bravery than the George Medal but took precedence over it in the Order of Wear. In addition, the QGM replaced the Colonial Police Medal for Gallantry (the last award of which was made in November 1974). It de facto replaced awards of the Sea Gallantry Medal, but this has never been formally announced.

The Royal Warrant for the Queen's Gallantry Medal was amended on 30 November 1977 to allow for posthumous awards, as was that for the George Medal.

The last list of civilian awards of the Queen's Gallantry Medal was published in March 2023 and a single, retrospective, military award was announced in March 2026. Since June 1974, therefore, there have been 1,102 awards of the Queen's Gallantry Medal announced in The London Gazette, including 19 second award bars. The armed forces received 543 awards and civilians, including police, 559 (including 120 to the Royal Ulster Constabulary, almost twice as many as any other group). Forty-two of the awards were posthumous, and 27 were to women.

Since the accession of King Charles III, the Queen's Gallantry Medal has been renamed the King's Gallantry Medal. The first six awards of the King's Gallantry Medal were announced on 14 May 2024. The first awards of the King's Gallantry Medal to members of the Armed Forces were announced on 14 June 2025.

== Criteria ==
The medal is awarded for "exemplary acts of bravery" by civilians, and by members of the Armed Forces for "actions for which purely military Honours are not normally granted". The award is not restricted to British subjects.

== Description ==
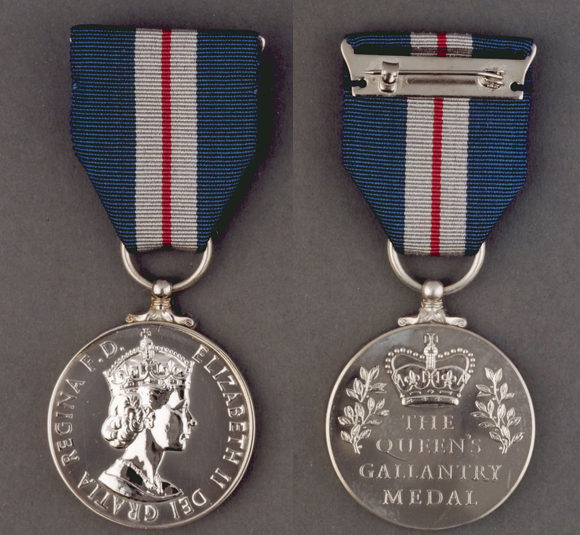
Obverse and reverse images of the QGM

The medal is silver and circular in shape, 36 mm in diameter, with the following design:

- The obverse of the QGM shows the crowned portrait of Queen Elizabeth II by Cecil Thomas and is inscribed "ELIZABETH II DEI GRATIA REGINA F.D.".
- The obverse of the KGM shows a crowned portrait of King Charles III and is inscribed "CHARLES III DEI GRATIA REX FID DEF".
- The reverse of the QGM (designed by Reynolds Stone CBE, RDI) bears the image of a St Edward's Crown above the words 'THE QUEEN'S GALLANTRY MEDAL' in four lines, flanked by laurel sprigs.
- The reverse of the KGM retains the general components of the original design but now shows the Tudor crown and is inscribed ‘THE KING’S GALLANTRY MEDAL’, in a subtly different, serif font.
- The 32 mm wide ribbon is of "Garter" blue, with a central stripe of pearl grey, within which is a narrow stripe of rose pink; the grey and rose colours represent the Order of the British Empire, which the medal replaced. While awards to women generally have the ribbon fashioned into a bow, female recipients in the armed forces or civilian uniformed services have the medal presented with the ribbon in the same style as for male recipients.
- The name of the recipient is impressed on the rim of the medal. When awarded to members of the Armed Forces, service number, rank, and unit are also included.
- A further award of the medal is indicated by a silver bar ornamented with laurel leaves worn on the ribbon. When the ribbon alone is worn, a silver rosette denotes a further award.

Recipients are entitled to the post-nominal letters "Q.G.M" or "K.G.M.".

== Notable recipients ==
Among the more notable recipients are:

- Charles Bruce, former 22 Special Air Service Soldier. Awarded in November 1986 for his conduct in Operation Banner, Northern Ireland in December 1984.
- Peter Edmonds, Metropolitan Police Officer. Awarded in March 1974 for his actions during the kidnap attempt of Anne, Princess Royal.
- Guy Edwards, former Formula 1 driver. Awarded for assisting in the rescue of Niki Lauda from his blazing Ferrari 312T at the 1976 German Grand Prix at the Nürburgring.
- John Leonard Graham. Detective Senior Constable, Queensland Police Service. Awarded in 1976 for the rescue of 36 occupants of the Coolangatta Hotel, after an arsonist set the hotel on fire on New Years Day, 1975. David Lacon (now Hewett-Lacon) and Ian Rogers also received the QGM for this rescue. Three police officers whom Rogers asked for urgent assistance, because flames were threatening to engulf both him and a semi conscious Lacon, either turned away, or said it was 'too dangerous', and then turned away. This incident is remarked upon in Nick Metcalfe's book. Graham had previously been awarded the George Medal for bravery in 1973, and was subsequently awarded the Queen's Commendation for Brave Conduct.
- Daniel Hellings, a 19-year-old Private from the 2nd Mercian Regiment of the British Army. Awarded in 2010 for uncovering several IED bombs in a combat situation in Helmand Province, Afghanistan.
- Chris Jewell and Jason Mallinson, two members of the British teams involved in the 2018 Tham Luang cave rescue.
- Anthony David Lacon (now Hewett-Lacon), a 23-year-old Queensland Police officer. Awarded in 1976 for multiple rescues from the Coolangatta Hotel fire, when John Graham and Ian Rogers also received the QGM.
- Stephen Oake, an anti-terrorism detective who was given the award posthumously after being murdered in Crumpsall, Manchester by Islamic terrorist Kamel Bourgass. Oake had prevented the al-Qaeda member from attacking his colleagues, despite being unarmed himself and having suffered eight serious stab wounds.
- Ian Kenneth Rogers, a 21-year-old Queensland Police officer. Awarded in 1976 for multiple rescues from the Coolangatta Hotel fire, when John Graham and Anthony Lacon also received the QGM.
- Michael Tanner. Police Inspector, British Transport Police. Awarded in 2003 for his actions in detaining a violent offender in Finsbury Park despite being stabbed twice himself.
- John Smeaton, former baggage handler. Awarded in December 2007 for his actions in the 2007 Glasgow International Airport attack.
- Ranger Cyril J. Smith, 2nd Bn Royal Irish Rangers; killed by a proxy bomb at a border checkpoint at Killeen, County Armagh, Northern Ireland on 24 October 1990. A Catholic man, Patrick Gillespie, who had been a civilian employee of the British Army, was forced to drive where the soldiers would be, or his two sons would be shot. He was to tell the soldiers they had forty minutes to get clear but within seconds of reaching the checkpoint, the bomb exploded. Smith, also a Catholic, died trying to warn colleagues and was awarded the Queens Gallantry Medal posthumously.
- Dominic Troulan. Awarded in May 1996 for service in Northern Ireland. After service in the Royal Marines and British Army, in June 2017 he became the first living British civilian to be awarded the George Cross since 1974 and the first holder of both the George Cross and the QGM.
- Stanley MacLeod. Diving Superintendent on the Piper Alpha oil platform, for leading 19 men to safety after the North Sea structure exploded.
- David Michael Groves. Royal Navy sailor on HMS Argyll. Awarded on 25 February 2020, for the dramatic rescue of 27 mariners from Grande America, which caught fire in rough seas in the Bay of Biscay.
- Leon McLeod. Police Constable, British Transport Police. Awarded in October 2018 for his actions during the 2017 London Bridge attack
- Michael Hooper. Police Sergeant, Leicestershire Police. Awarded in May 2021 for his actions during the 2018 helicopter crash outside Leicester City Football club
- Stephen Quartermain. Police Constable, Leicestershire Police. Awarded in May 2021 for his actions during the 2018 helicopter crash outside Leicester City Football club
- Paramedics Jake Walker and Stacey Farrington who put themselves and their ambulance in harm's way to stop a drunk driver speeding up the wrong side of the M6 motorway in 2020

== See also ==
- British and Commonwealth orders and decorations
- Royal Logistic Corps Operational Honours

== Sources ==
- Abbott, Peter Edward; Tamplin, John Michael Alan (1981). British Gallantry Awards (2nd ed.). London, UK: Nimrod Dix and Co. ISBN 9780902633742.
- Duckers, Peter (2001). British Gallantry Awards 1855–2000. Princes Risborough, Buckinghamshire, UK: Shire Publications. ISBN 9780747805168.
- Metcalfe, Nick (2014). For Exemplary Bravery: The Queen's Gallantry Medal. Timberland, UK: N P Metcalfe. ISBN 978-0-9572695-1-4.
- Mussell, John W.; the Editorial Team of Medal News, eds. (2017). The Medal Yearbook 2017. Devon, UK: Token Publishing Ltd. ISBN 9781908828316.
- Amending Royal Warrants to the George Medal and Queen's Gallantry Medal dated 30 November 1977.
